= Istora Mandiri MRT station =

MRT station in Jakarta, Indonesia

M09 Istora Mandiri
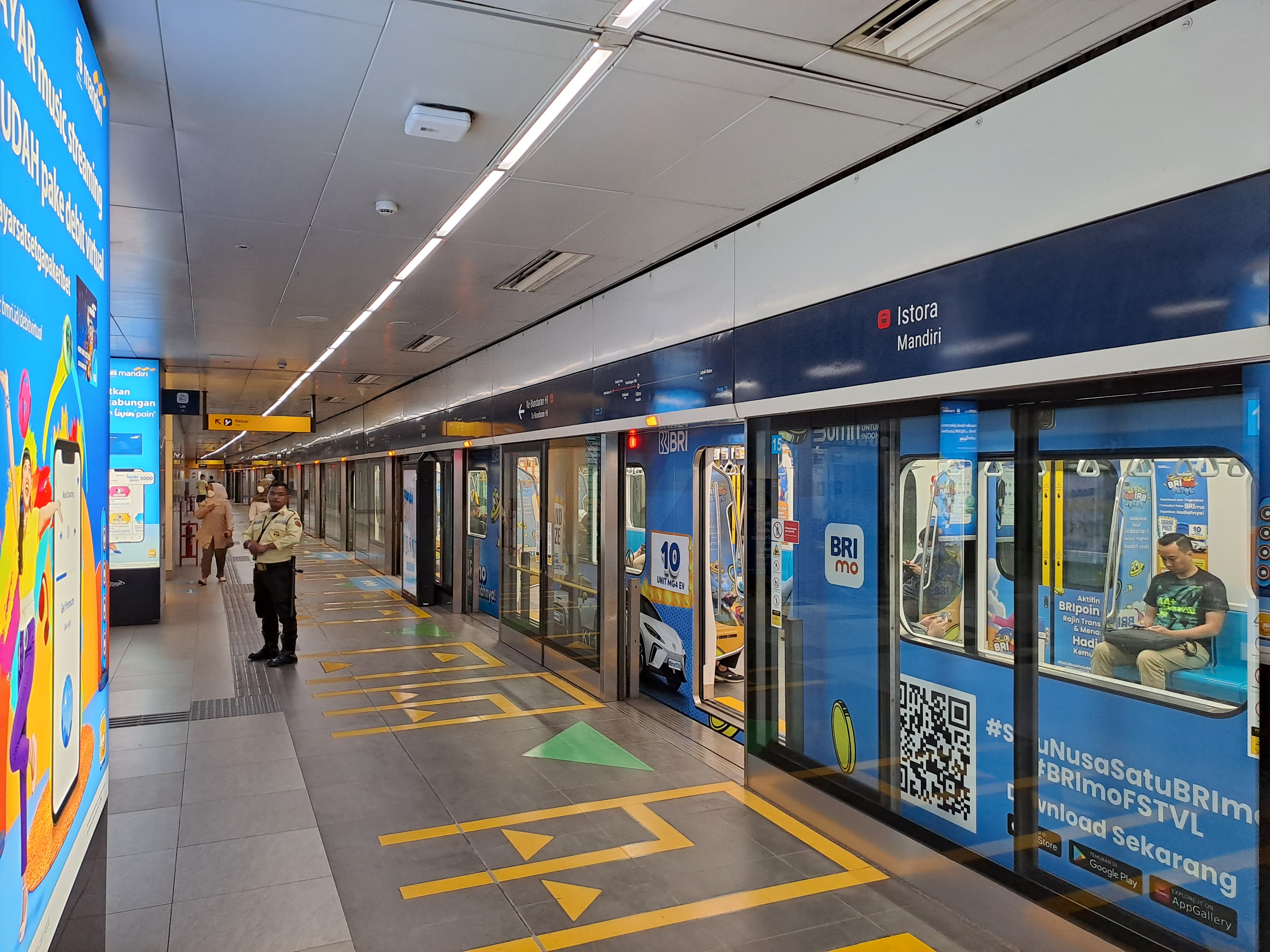
- The platform screen doors of the station

General information
- Location: Jl. Jendral Sudirman no. 200, Senayan, Kebayoran Baru, South Jakarta; Jakarta; Indonesia
- Coordinates: 6.222331°S 106.808573°E
- Owner: MRT Jakarta
- Operator: MRT Jakarta
- Line: North–South line
- Platforms: single island platform
- Tracks: 2
- Connections: Polda Metro Jaya

Construction
- Structure type: Underground
- Depth: 15 m (49 ft)
- Parking: Available
- Accessible: Available

Other information
- Station code: IST

History
- Opened: 24 March 2019; 7 years ago

Services
Preceding station	Jakarta MRT	Following station
Senayan Mastercard towards Lebak Bulus	North-South Line	Bendungan Hilir towards Bundaran HI Bank Jakarta
Route map
Location
- Location within Jakarta

Istora MRT Station (or Istora Mandiri MRT Station, with Bank Mandiri granted for naming rights) is a rapid transit station on the North-South Line of the Jakarta MRT in Jakarta, Indonesia. Located on Jl. Jendral Sudirman, it is located between the Bendungan Hilir and Senayan Mastercard stations, and has the station code IST.

The station is located near the Sudirman Central Business District (SCBD), which houses the Indonesia Stock Exchange, Pacific Place mall, and Ritz-Carlton hotel, among others. The word Istora in its name comes from Istora Gelora Bung Karno, located within Gelora Bung Karno Sports Complex nearby the station.

== Location ==
The second underground station on the MRT, Istora Mandiri station is located on Jl. Jendral Sudirman in Kebayoran Baru, South Jakarta. Nearby is the shopping mall of Pacific Place, the Ritz-Carlton Hotel, and the Indonesia Stock Exchange, all located within the greater Sudirman Central Business district (SCBD). The station is located close to the Gelora Bung Karno Sports complex and the headquarters of Greater Jakarta Metropolitan Police (Polda Metro Jaya or PMJ), as well as the Semanggi Interchange with Jl. Gatot Sobroto and the Jakarta Inner Ring Road.

== History ==
The station was officially opened, along with the rest of Phase 1 of the Jakarta MRT on 24 March 2019.

== Station layout ==
G	Street	Entrances and exits
B1	Concourse	Ticket Gates, Ticket Machines, Counters, and Retail Kiosks
B2; Platform	Platform 1	North South Line to Lebak Bulus (←)
B2; Platform	Island platform, the doors are opened on the left side
B2; Platform	Platform 2	North South Line to Bundaran HI Bank Jakarta (→)

== Incident ==
The entrances of Istora Mandiri station were vandalized, damaged and arsoned during a mass protest that took place in front of the Polda Metro Jaya Headquarters on 29 August 2025. Some of the culprits stormed the concourse area by looting some vending machines. Damages of CCTV cameras were also reported.

== Gallery ==
One of the entrances at the north side of the road

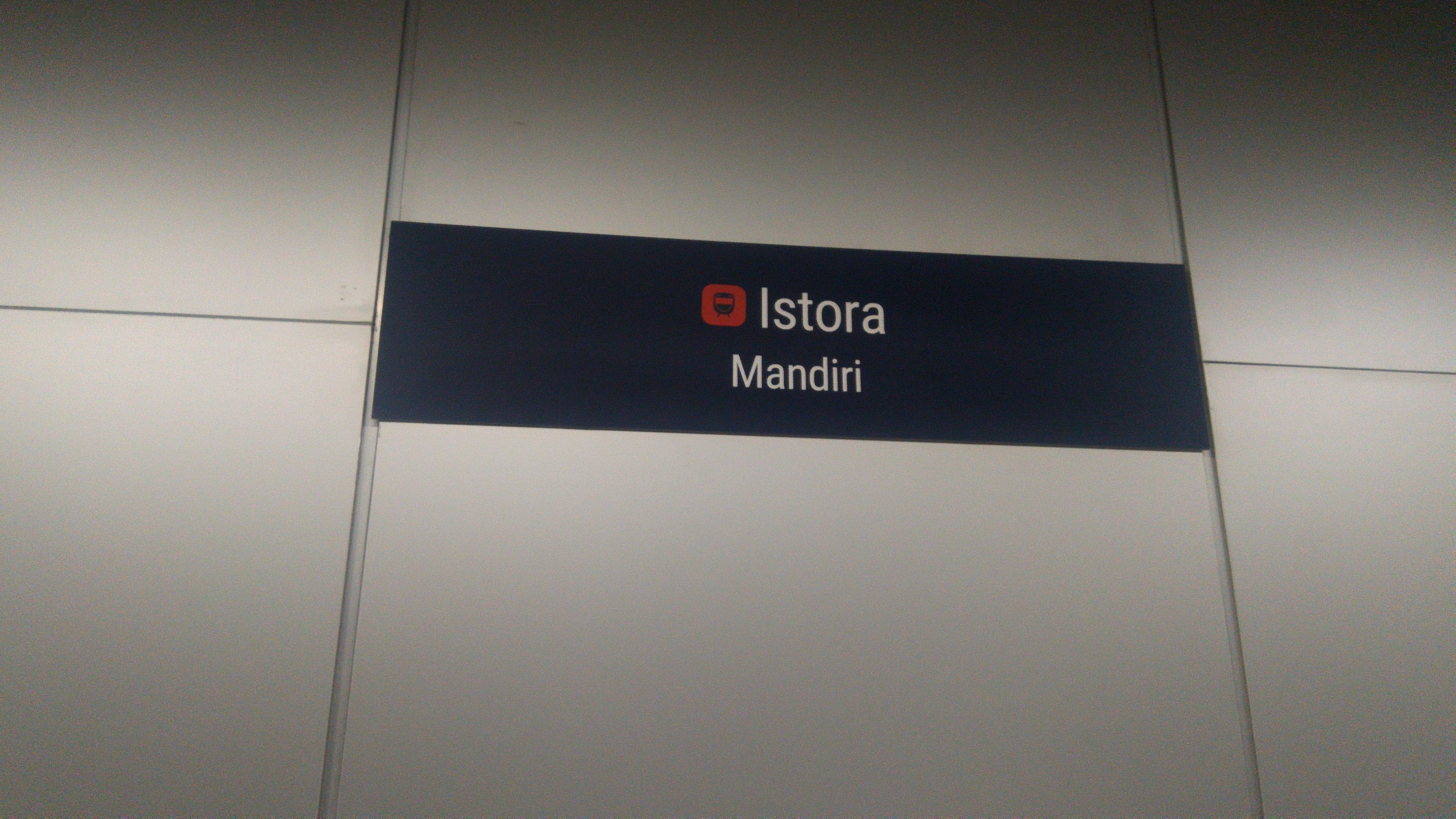
The signage of the station

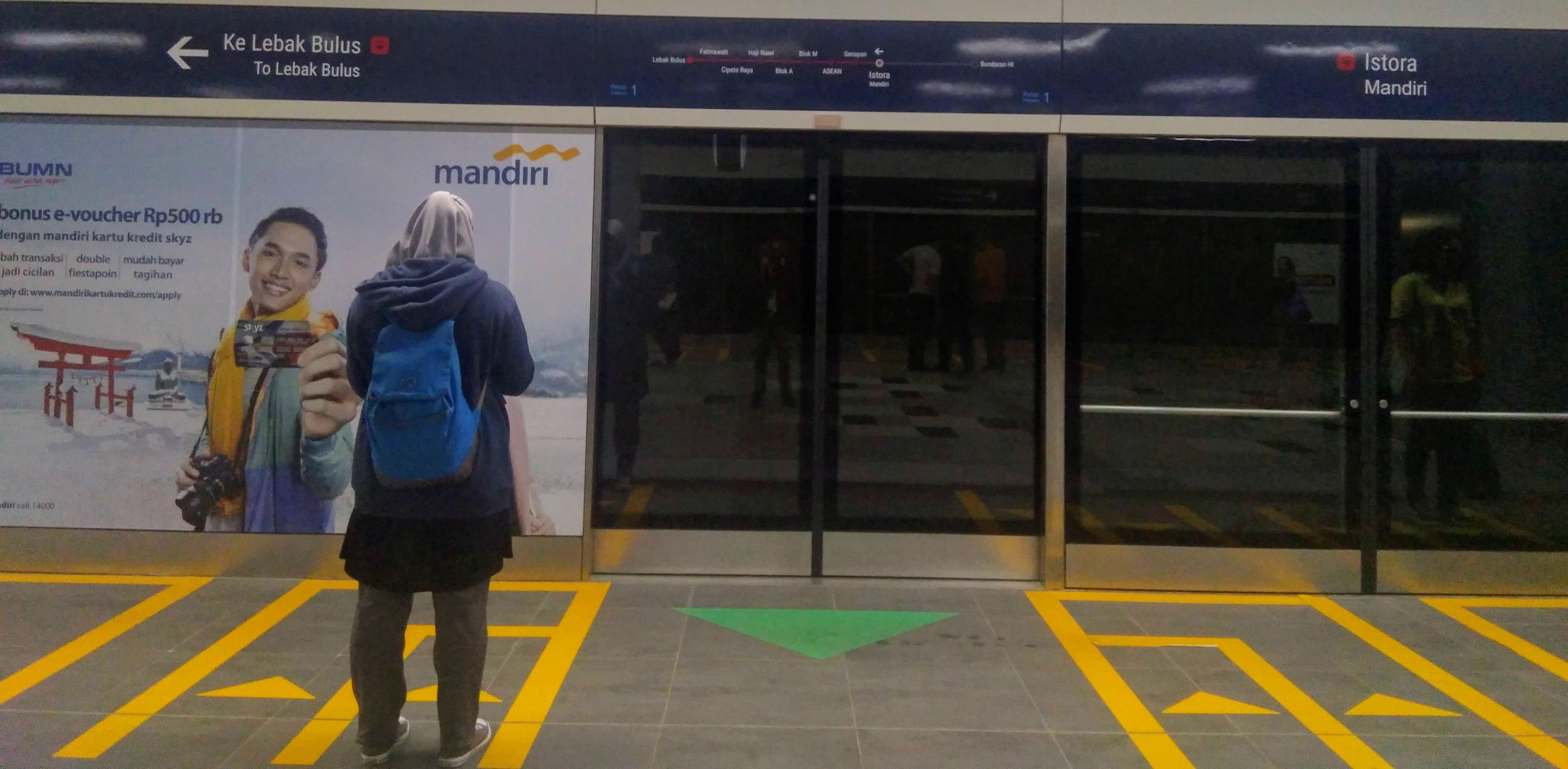
Passenger waiting in the platform area
