= Setiabudi Astra MRT station =

MRT station in Jakarta, Indonesia

M11 Setiabudi Astra
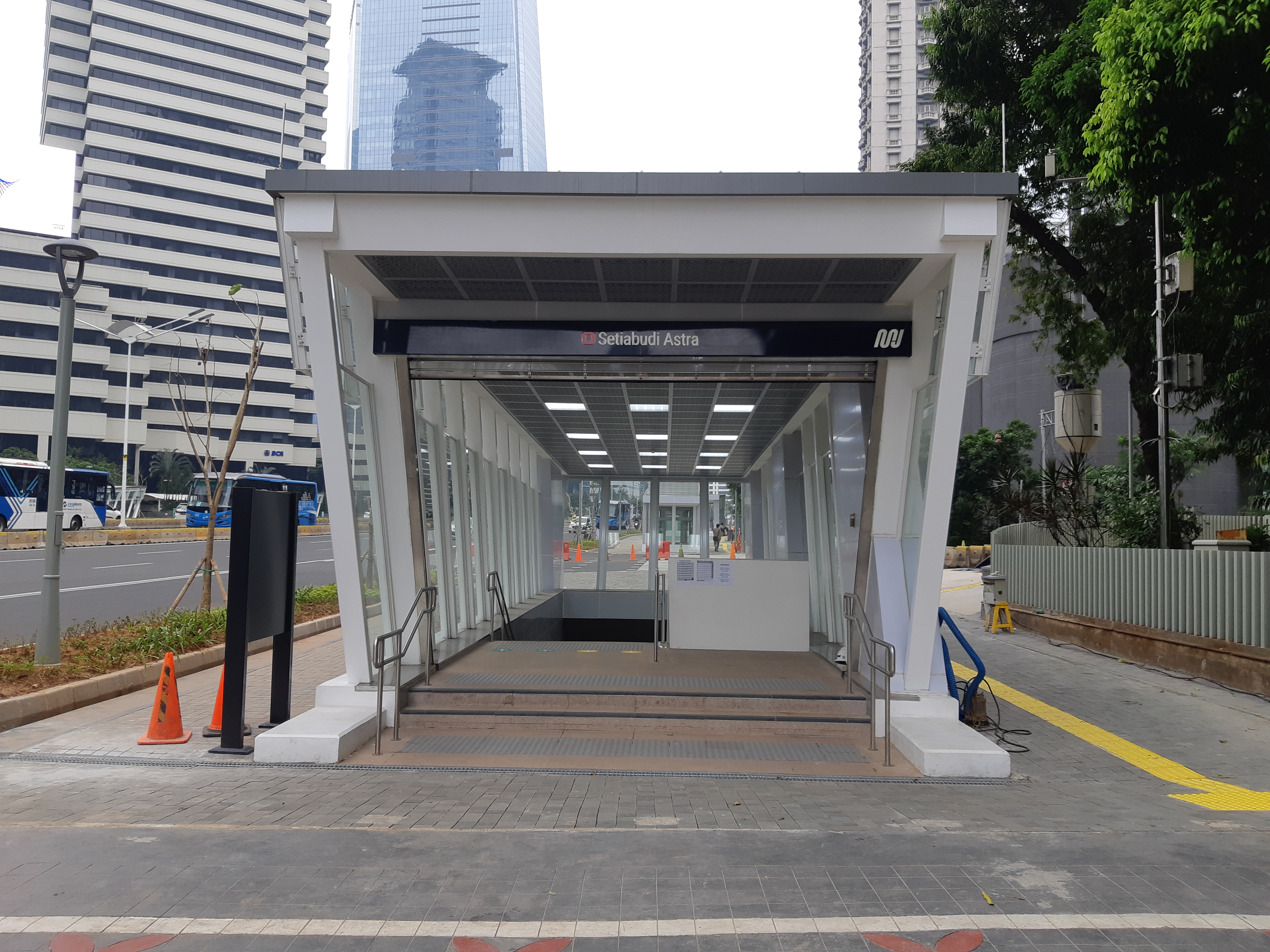
- Setiabudi Astra Station entrance

General information
- Location: Jl. Jenderal Sudirman Kav. 21, Setiabudi, Setiabudi, South Jakarta; Indonesia
- Coordinates: 6.2091°S 106.8217°E
- Owner: MRT Jakarta
- Operator: MRT Jakarta
- Line: North–South line
- Platforms: Single island platform
- Tracks: 2

Construction
- Structure type: Underground
- Accessible: Available

Other information
- Station code: STB

History
- Opened: 24 March 2019; 7 years ago

Services
Preceding station	Jakarta MRT	Following station
Bendungan Hilir towards Lebak Bulus	North-South Line	Dukuh Atas BNI towards Bundaran HI Bank Jakarta
Route map
Location
- Location within Jakarta

Setiabudi MRT Station (or Setiabudi Astra MRT Station, with Astra International granted for naming rights) is a rapid transit station on the North-South Line of the Jakarta MRT. Located at Karet Kuningan, Setiabudi, South Jakarta. Despite the similar names, it is not an interchange and is not to be confused with the LRT Jabodebek station at Setiabudi LRT station, and is in fact located 600 meters apart from each other.

== History ==
The station officially opened, along with the rest of Phase 1 of the Jakarta MRT on 24 March 2019.

== Station layout ==
G	Street	Entrances and exits
B1	Concourse	Ticket Gates, Ticket Machines, Counters, and Retail Kiosks
B2; Platform	Platform 1	North South Line to Lebak Bulus Bank Syariah Indonesia (←)
B2; Platform	Island platform, the doors are opened on the left side
B2; Platform	Platform 2	North South Line to Bundaran HI Bank Jakarta (→)

== Places of interest ==
- Davinci Tower
- Chillax Sudirman Community Center

== Gallery ==
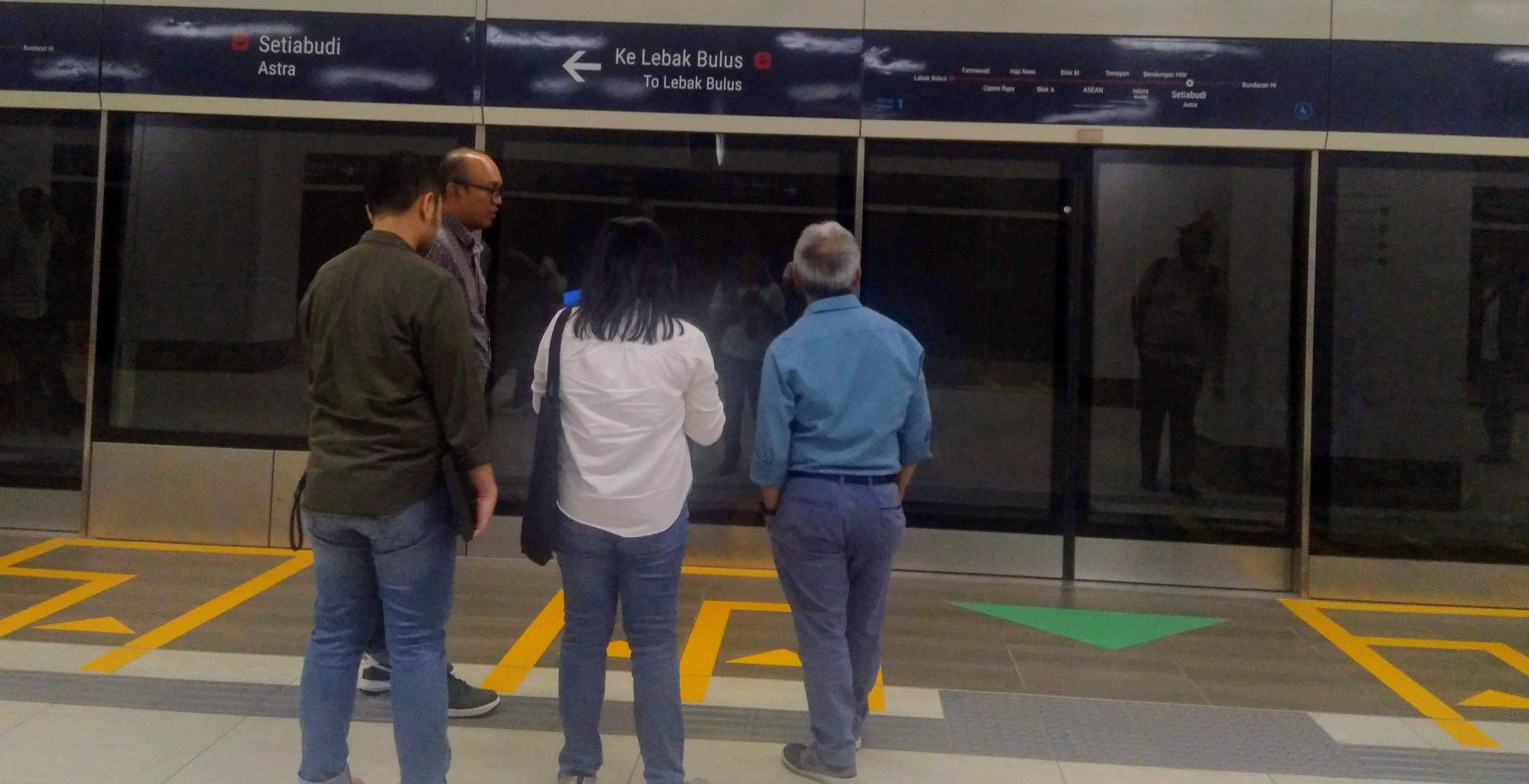
Passengers waiting near the platform screen door

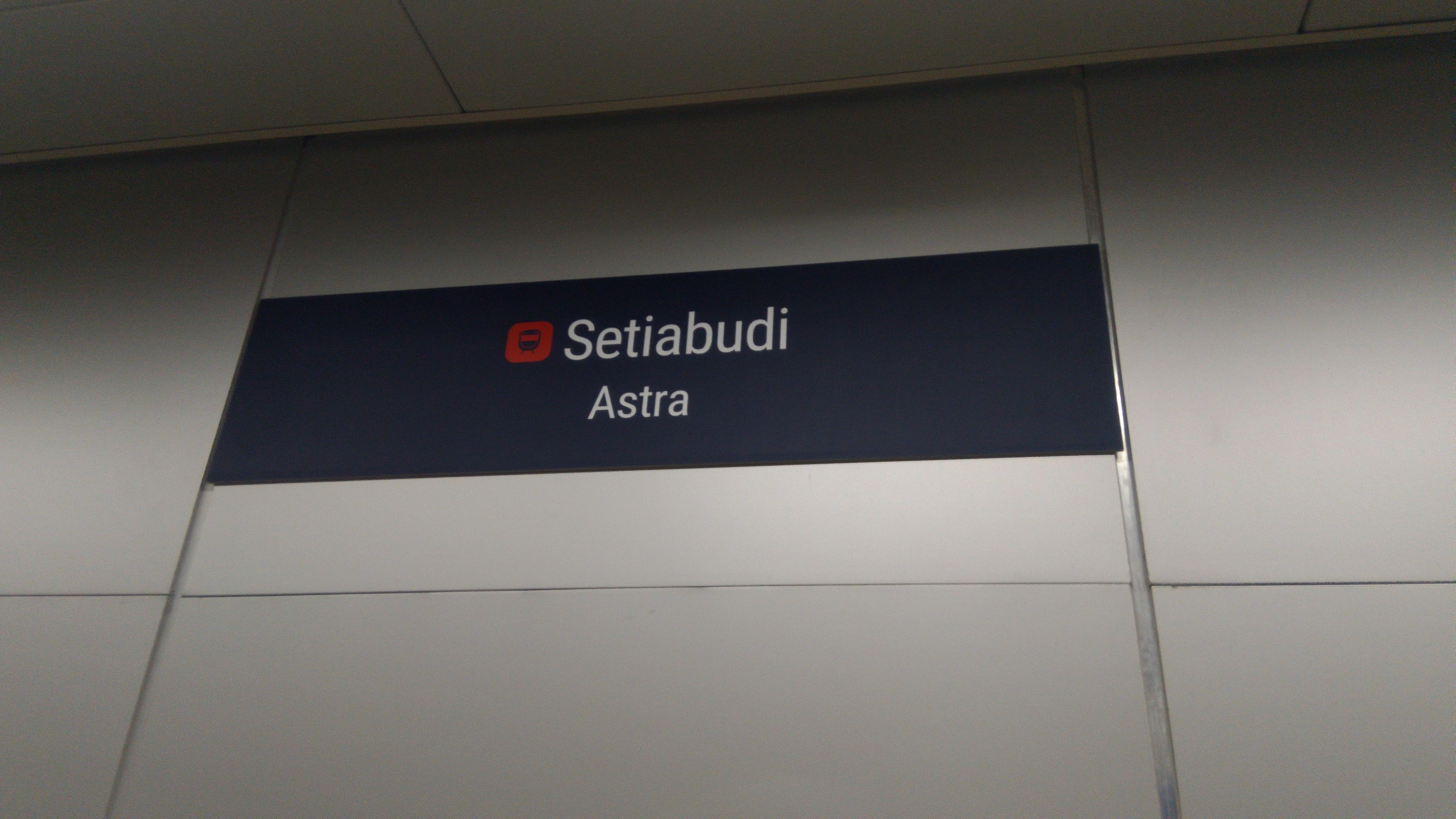
The signage of the station.
