= Bendungan Hilir MRT station =

MRT station in Jakarta, Indonesia

M10 Bendungan Hilir
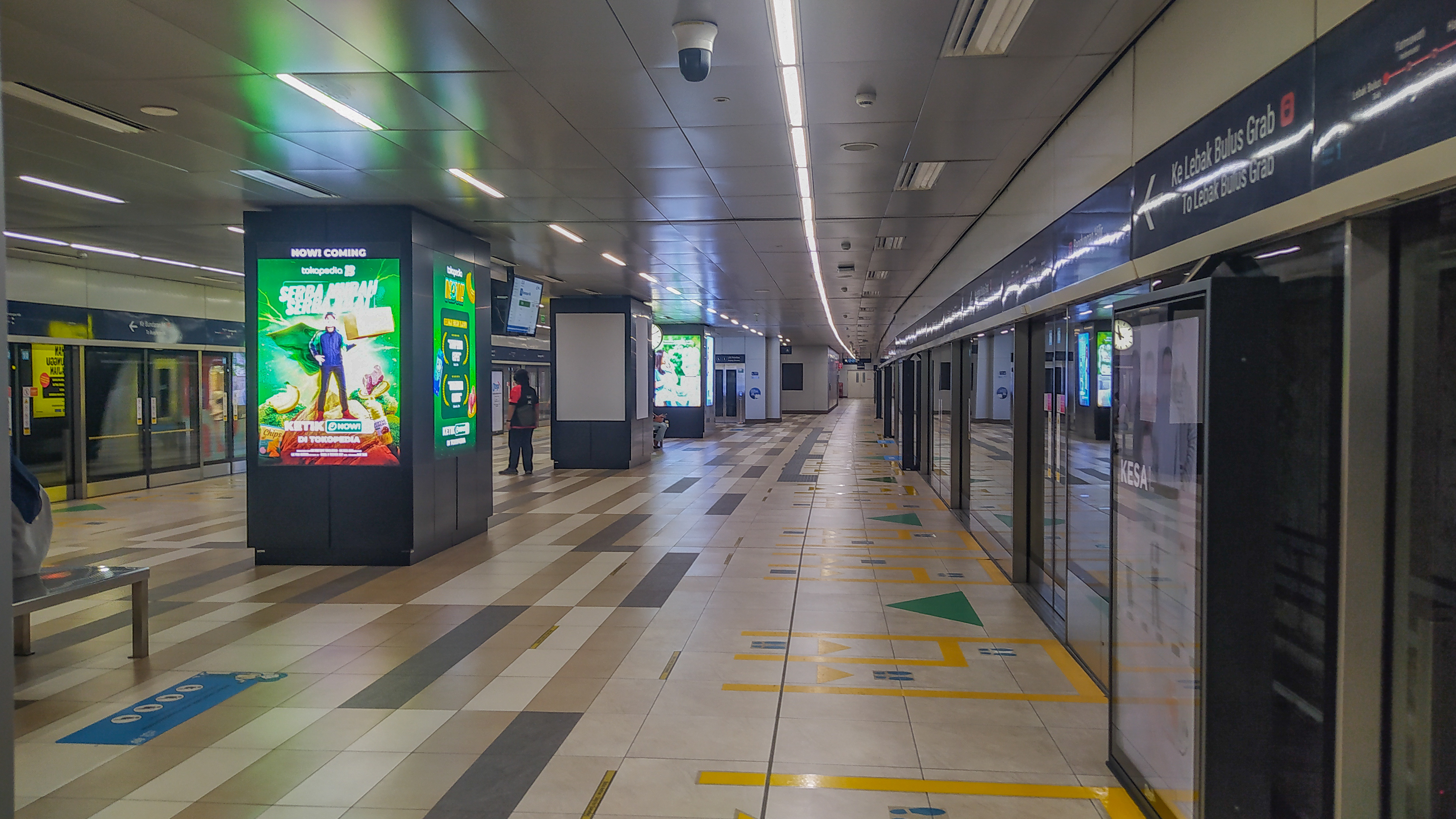
- Bendungan Hilir Station platform

General information
- Location: Jalan Jenderal Sudirman; Karet Tengsin, Tanah Abang, Central Jakarta; Karet Semanggi, Setiabudi, South Jakarta; Jakarta; Indonesia
- Coordinates: 6.2154465°S 106.8173187°E
- Owner: MRT Jakarta
- Operator: MRT Jakarta
- Line: North–South line
- Platforms: single island platform
- Tracks: 2

Construction
- Structure type: Underground
- Accessible: Available

Other information
- Station code: BNH

History
- Opened: 24 March 2019; 7 years ago

Services
Preceding station	Jakarta MRT	Following station
Istora Mandiri towards Lebak Bulus	North-South Line	Setiabudi Astra towards Bundaran HI Bank Jakarta
Route map
Location
- Location within Jakarta

Bendungan Hilir Station is a rapid transit station on the North-South Line of the Jakarta MRT. It is located at Jalan Jenderal Sudirman, at the border between Karet Tengsin, Tanah Abang in Central Jakarta and Karet Semanggi, Setiabudi in South Jakarta, and has the station code BNH. The station has only two railway lines separated by an island platform in the middle. Although named Bendungan Hilir, the station is not located in the Bendungan Hilir neighborhood, but rather in the east of the neighborhood.

== History ==
The station officially opened, along with the rest of Phase 1 of the Jakarta MRT on 24 March 2019.

== Station layout ==
G	Street	Entrances and exits
B1	Concourse	Ticket Gates, Ticket Machines, Counters, and Retail Kiosks
B2; Platform	Platform 1	North South Line to Lebak Bulus Bank Syariah Indonesia (←)
B2; Platform	Island platform, the doors are opened on the left side
B2; Platform	Platform 2	North South Line to Bundaran HI Bank Jakarta (→)

== Places of interest ==
- World Trade Center Jakarta
  - Embassy of Canada
  - Embassy of Panama
  - Embassy of Ecuador
  - Consulate of the (The Gambia) Gambia
- Intiland Tower
- Le Meridien Jakarta
- JPO Karet Crossing
