= Dukuh Atas BNI MRT station =

MRT station in Jakarta, Indonesia

M12 Dukuh Atas BNI
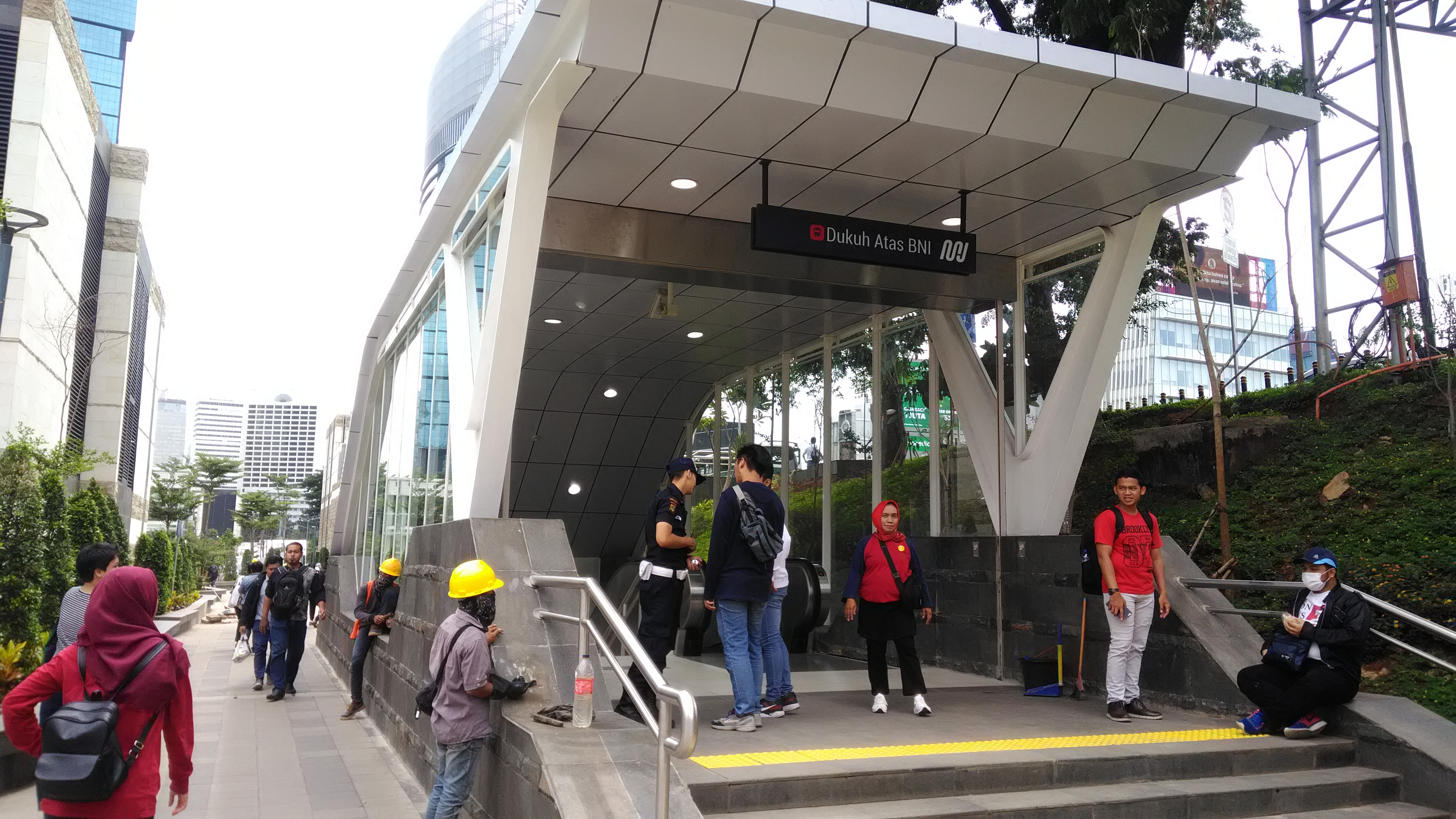
- Entrance of Dukuh Atas BNI Station

General information
- Location: Jl. Tanjung Karang, Menteng, Menteng, Central Jakarta; Jakarta; Indonesia
- Coordinates: 6.200786°S 106.822746°E
- Owner: MRT Jakarta
- Operator: MRT Jakarta
- Line: North–South line
- Platforms: single island platform
- Tracks: 2
- Connections: BNI City; Sudirman; Dukuh Atas Bank Syariah Indonesia; Dukuh Atas; Galunggung

Construction
- Structure type: Underground
- Accessible: Available

Other information
- Station code: DKA

History
- Opened: 24 March 2019; 7 years ago

Services
Preceding station	Jakarta MRT	Following station
Setiabudi Astra towards Lebak Bulus	North-South Line	Bundaran HI Bank Jakarta Terminus
Route map
Location
- Location within Jakarta

Dukuh Atas MRT Station (or Dukuh Atas BNI MRT Station, with Bank Negara Indonesia granted for naming rights) is an underground rapid transit station on the North-South Line of the Jakarta MRT in Jakarta, Indonesia. It is located in the Kebon Melati area of Tanah Abang, Central Jakarta and is built under Jalan Jenderal Sudirman. As part of the Dukuh Atas TOD, the station is connected to many connecting transportation services, such as the Jabodetabek Commuter Line, Soekarno-Hatta International Airport Rail Link, Jabodebek LRT and Transjakarta. This station is the deepest railway station in Indonesia, as it is built 24 meters underground, given its close proximity to the Ciliwung river.

== History ==
The station officially opened, along with the rest of Phase 1 of the Jakarta MRT on 24 March 2019.

== Station layout ==
The station has only two railway lines separated by an island platform in the middle.

G	Street	Entrances and exits
B1	Concourse	Ticket Gates, Ticket Machines, Counters, and Retail Kiosks
B2; Platform	Platform 1	North South Line to Lebak Bulus Bank Syariah Indonesia (←)
B2; Platform	Island platform, the doors are opened on the left side
B2; Platform	Platform 2	North South Line to Bundaran HI Bank Jakarta (→)

== Gallery ==
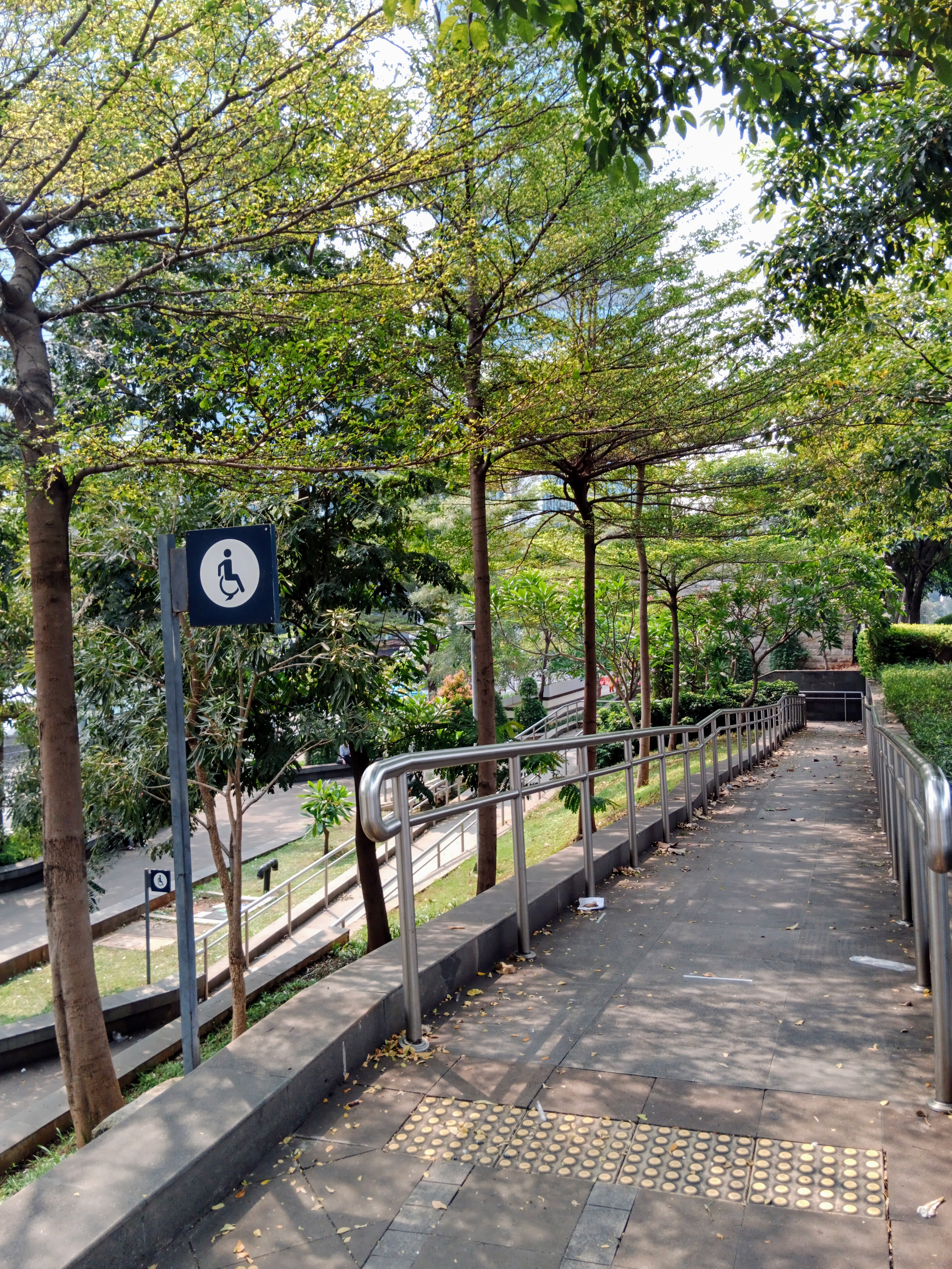
Wheelchair ramp towards the station entrance

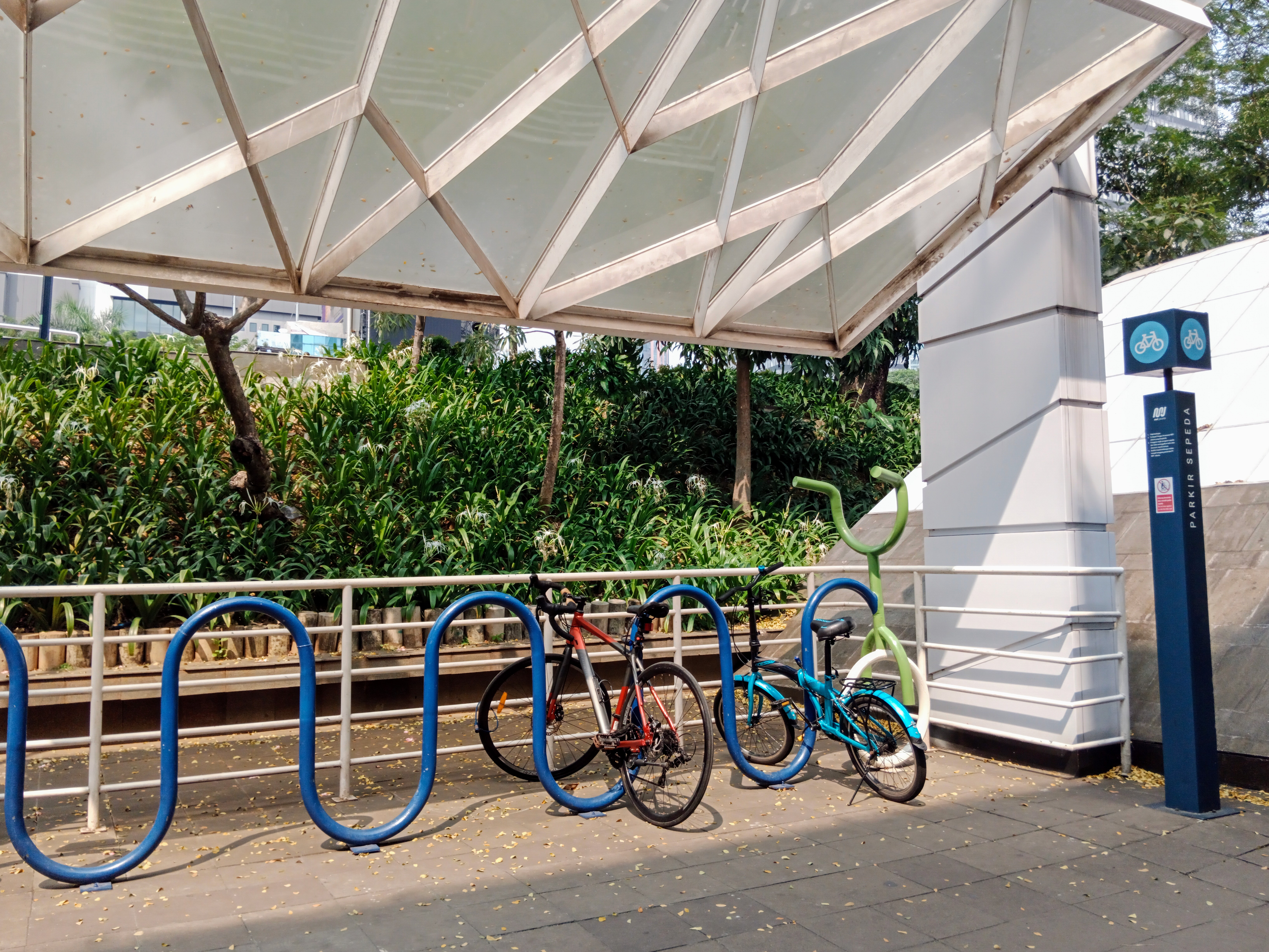
Bike rack near the entrance

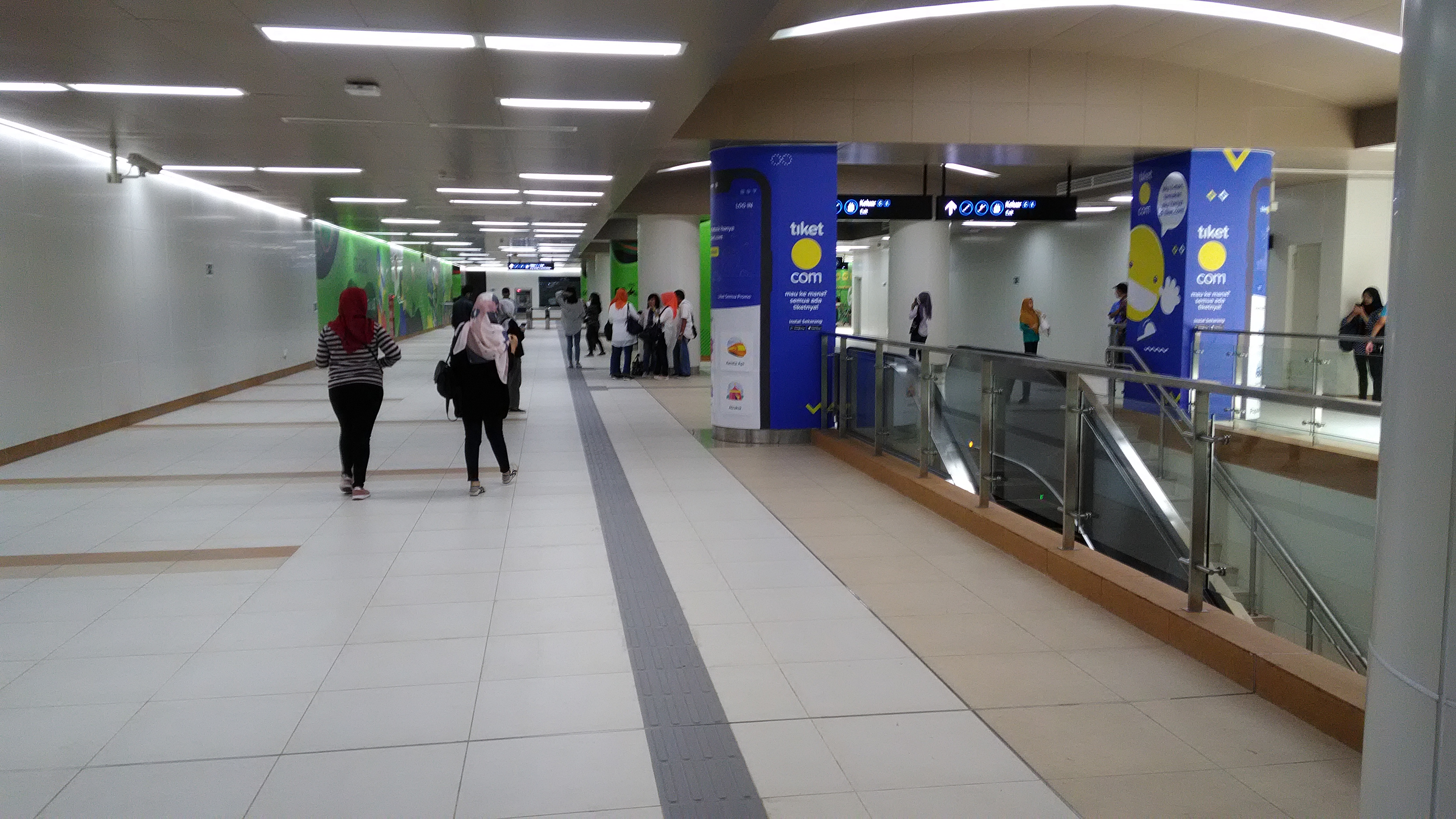
Concourse area

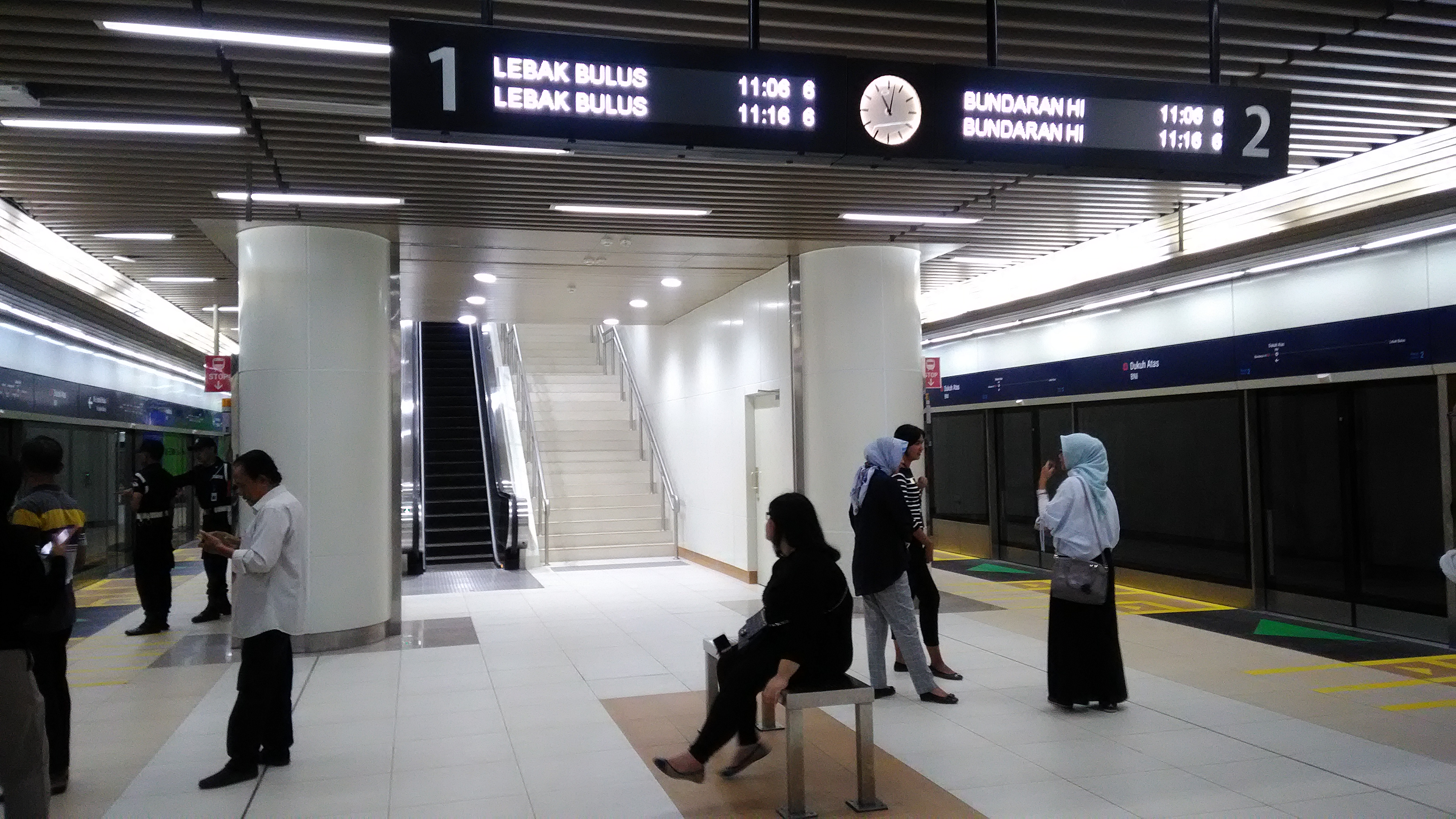
Platform area

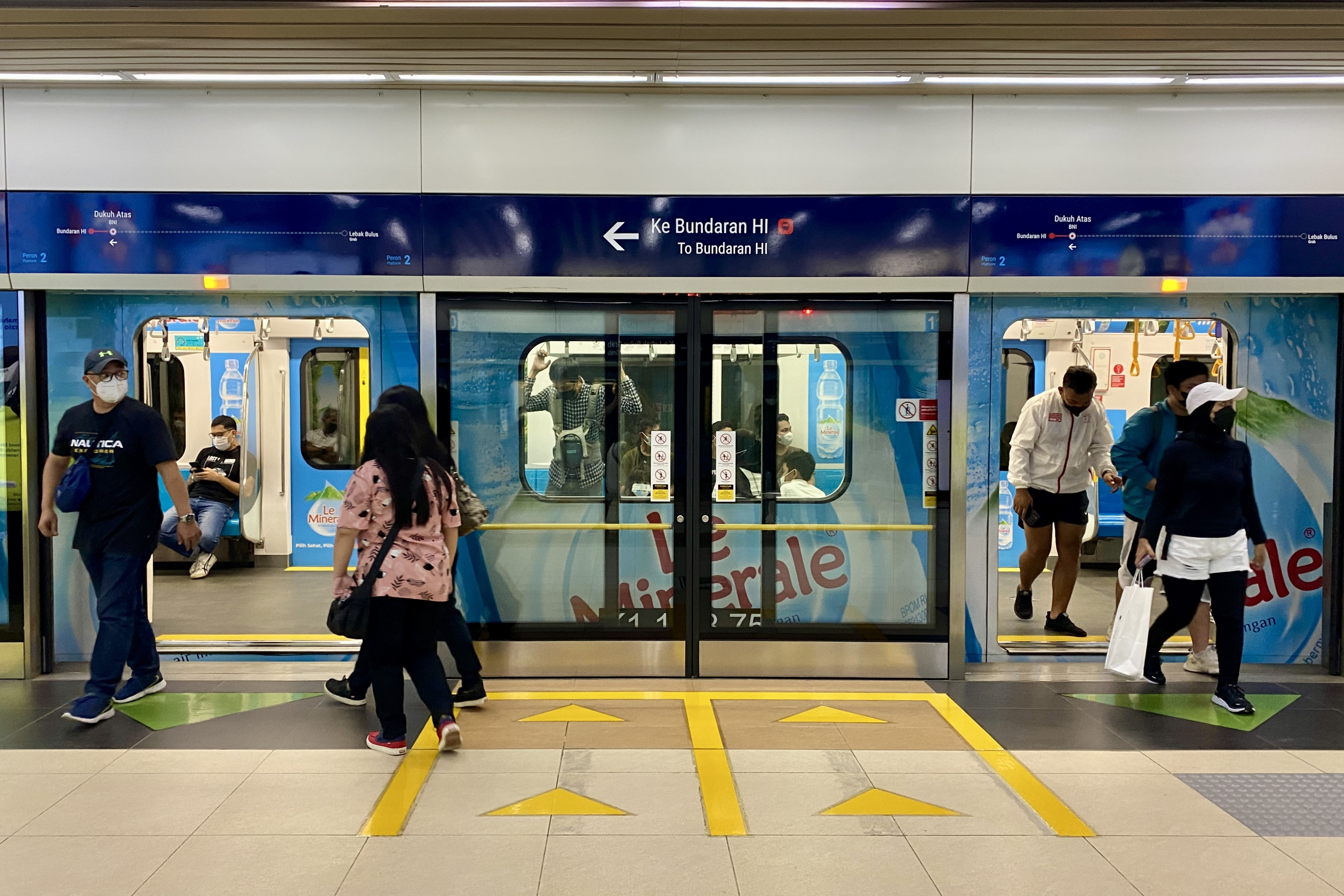
The platform screen doors

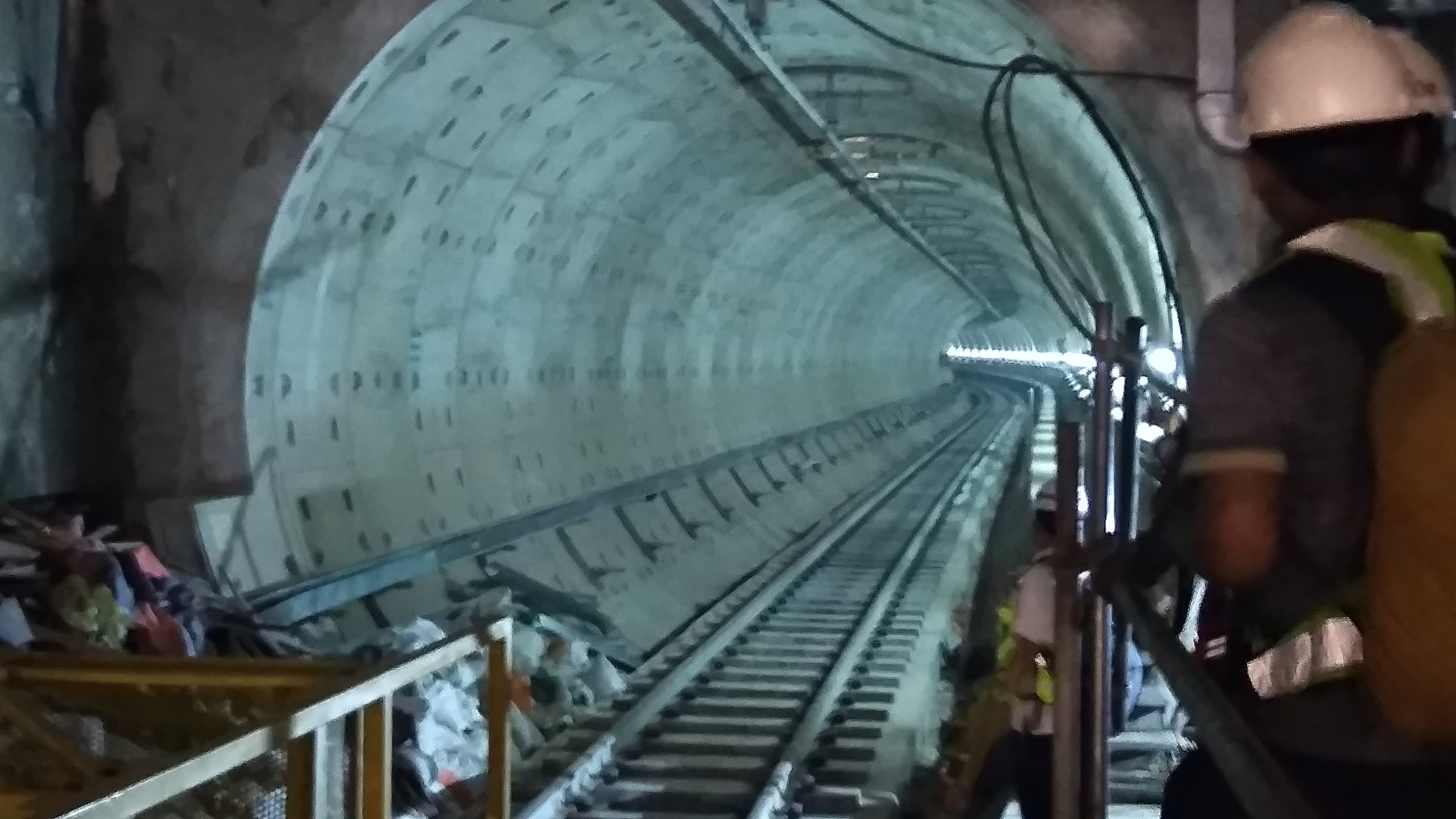
MRT Dukuh Atas tunnel under construction (2018)
