= North–South Line (Jakarta MRT) =

Rapid transit line of Jakarta MRT

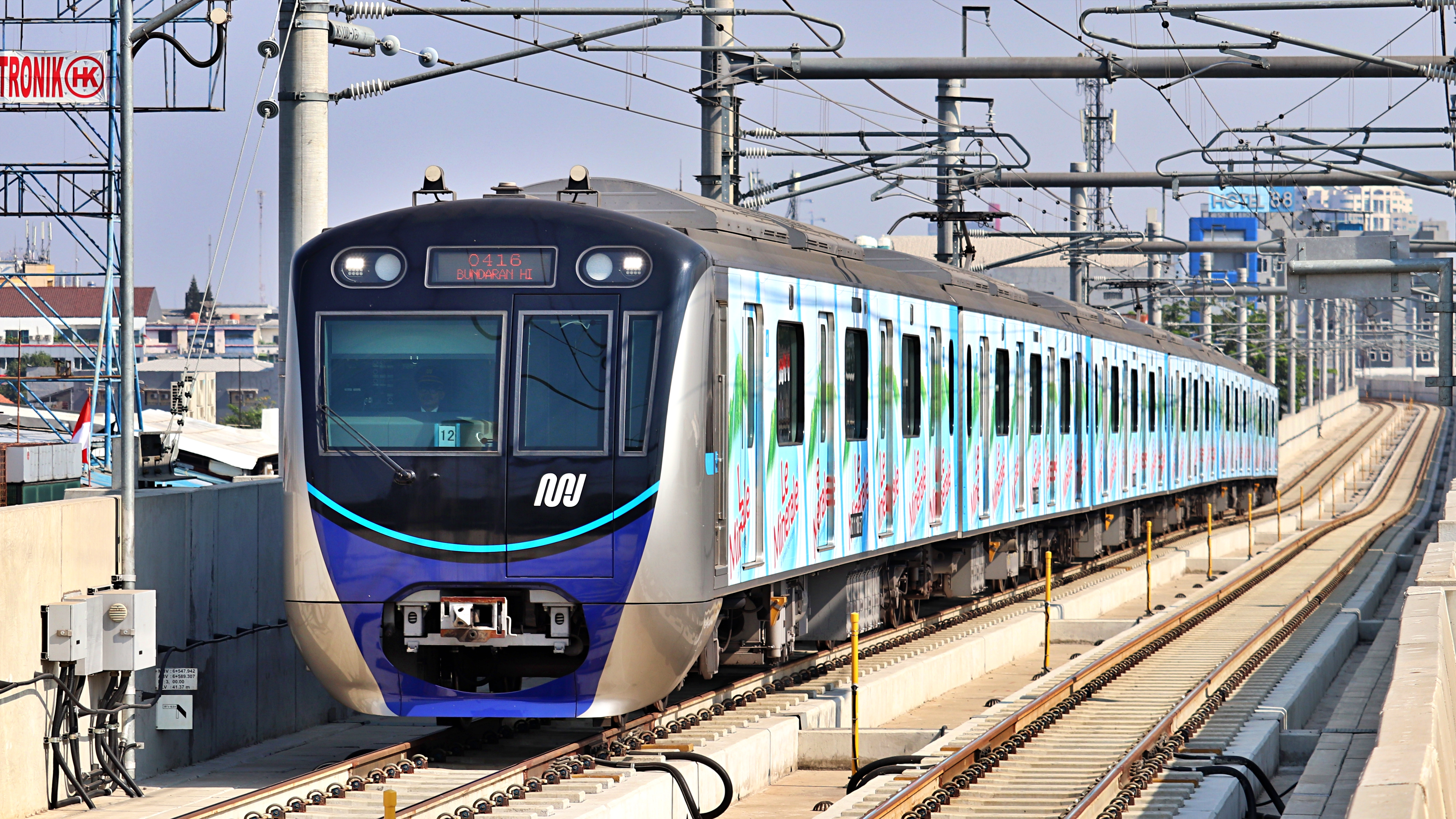
- Ratangga 1000 series LBB12 train

Overview
- Native name: Lin Utara–Selatan
- Status: Operational (Phase 1); Under construction (Phase 2A); Planned (Phase 2B)
- Owner: Jakarta MRT
- Locale: Jakarta, Indonesia
- Termini: Lebak Bulus; Bundaran HI Bank Jakarta Kota (under construction) Ancol Barat (planned)
- Stations: 22 (13 operational, 7 under construction, 2 planned)

Service
- Type: Rapid transit
- System: Jakarta MRT
- Services: 1
- Operator: Jakarta MRT
- Depots: Lebak Bulus; Ancol Barat (future)
- Rolling stock: 16 six-car MRTJ 1000 series trainsets Future 48 six-car sets

History
- Commenced: 10 October 2013; 12 years ago
- Planned opening: 2028; 2 years' time (Phase 2A); 2032; 6 years' time (Phase 2B)
- Opened: 24 March 2019; 7 years ago (Phase 1)

Technical
- Line length: 15.7 km (9.8 mi)
- Character: Elevated and underground
- Track gauge: 1,067 mm (3 ft 6 in)
- Electrification: 1,500 V DC from overhead catenary
- Operating speed: 100 km/h (62 mph)

The North–South line is a rapid transit line of the Jakarta MRT. Coloured dark red on the map, the line is currently 15.7 km (9.8 mi) long and serves 13 stations. It is the first and currently only operational line of the Jakarta MRT. The line is the second rail transit system to be operated in the country, after Palembang LRT.

== History ==
=== Planning ===
The origins of the line and its development came in 1995, when the provincial government set up an idea to build the MRT system (subway), A giant Japanese company, Itochu, was certainly a candidate for the tender. Three months later, when then Governor of DKI Jakarta (at that time), Soerjadi Soedirdja, announced the formation of a consortium to build the system. In the same year, an international consortium was formed to prepare a feasibility study for the first line of the MRT system and the consortium was named Indonesian Japanese European Group (IJEG). The plan would have involved a 14 km route between Blok M and Jakarta Kota Station, fully built underground.

The following year, the wide and comfortable pedestrian paths in Singapore were related to the construction of subway stations and this was planned to be completed and operational in 2000. Unfortunately, in 1998, it never happened due to the 1998 riots.

=== Development ===
The development of the first line began when then President Susilo Bambang Yudhoyono designated the system as a national project. On 28 November 2006, the first loan agreement was signed with the Japan International Cooperation Agency (JICA, then Japan Bank for International Cooperation or JBIC) for the project. The agreement included study funding and construction work funding for the first line of the system.

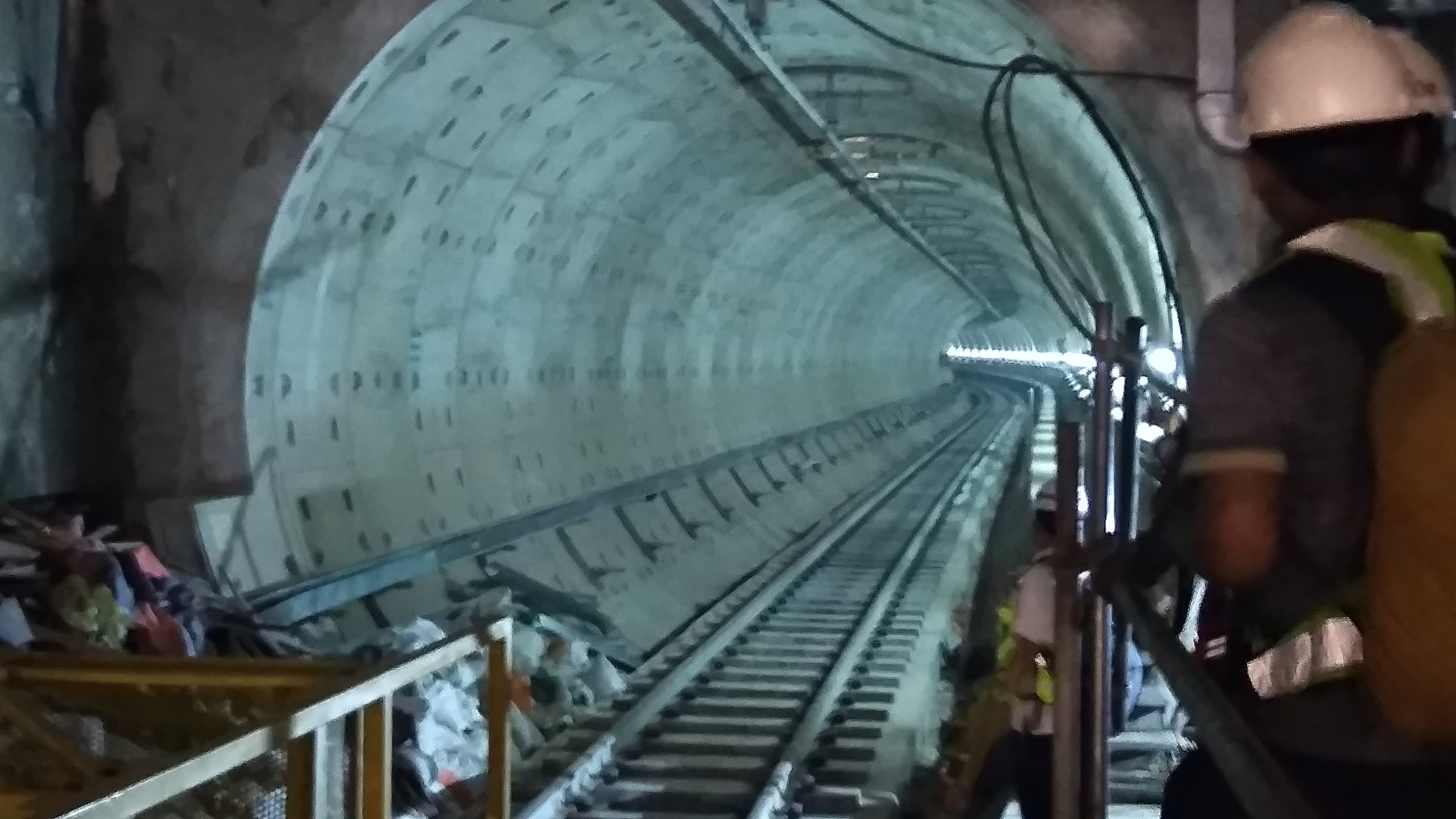
Jakarta MRT underground section between Dukuh Atas station and Bundaran HI, in March 2018

=== Phase 1 ===
A total of eight contracts were awarded.

- CP 101 (Construction of Lebak Bulus Depot, Lebak Bulus station and related elevated works) awarded to Tokyu Corporation - Wijaya Karya consortium.
- CP 102 (Construction of Cipete Raya and Fatmawati stations and related elevated works) awarded to Tokyu Corporation - Wijaya Karya consortium.
- CP 103 (Construction of Haji Nawi, Blok A, Blok M and ASEAN stations and related elevated works) awarded to Obayashi Corporation - Shimizu Corporation - PT Jaya Konstruksi JV.
- CP 104 (Construction of Senayan and Istora stations and related tunnelling works) awarded to Shimizu Corporation - Obayashi Corporation - PT Wijaya Karya - PT Jaya Konstruksi JV.
- CP 105 (Construction of Bendungan Hilir and Senayan stations and related tunnelling works) awarded to Shimizu Corporation - Obayashi Corporation - PT Wijaya Karya - PT Jaya Konstruksi JV.
- CP 106 (Construction of Dukuh Atas and Bundaran HI stations and related tunnelling works) awarded to Sumitomo Mitsui Construction - PT Hutama Karya consortium.
- CP 107 (Construction of railway systems and trackworks) awarded to Metro One consortium (namely Mitsui & Co. – Toyo Engineering Corporation – Kobe Steel, Ltd – Inti Karya Persada Tehnik).
- CP 108 (Construction of rolling stock) awarded to Sumitomo Corporation - Nippon Sharyo consortium.

On 1 June 2013, the first three civil contracts for the 9.2 km (5.7 mi) underground section were signed. Three civil engineering contracts for the elevated section were signed in the third quarter of 2013. Construction work began in October 2013.

Tunnelling was completed on 23 February 2017, meeting the target completion date. By October 2017, the construction of both elevated and underground line sections were completed.

Ahead of its official opening, a limited public trial run was conducted from 12 March 2019 to 23 March 2019. The official opening ceremony was held on 24 March 2019 by President Joko Widodo.

=== Phase 2 ===
A total of eight contracts were put up.

- CP 200 (Construction of underground electrical substation near Monas station) awarded to PT Trocon Indah Perkasa.
- CP 201 (Construction of Thamrin and Monas stations and related tunnelling works) awarded to Shimizu Corporation - PT Adhi Karya JV.
- CP 202 (Construction of Harmoni, Sawah Besar and Mangga Besar stations and related tunnelling works) awarded to Shimizu Corporation - PT Adhi Karya JV.
- CP 203 (Construction of Glodok and Kota stations and related tunnelling works) awarded to Sumitomo Mitsui Construction Company - PT Hutama Karya JO.
- CP 204 (Construction of depot at Ancol Barat).
- CP 205 (Construction of railway systems and trackworks) awarded to Sojitz-Larsen and Toubro Limited JV.
- CP 206 (Construction of eight sets of rolling stock) awarded to Sumitomo Corporation.
- CP 207 (Installation of Automatic Fare Collection system).

Groundbreaking for Phase 2 was initially planned to begin on 19 December 2018. However, due to land acquisition issues, it was pushed back to January 2019. On 30 January 2019, President Director of PT MRT Jakarta, William Sabandar announced that the groundbreaking ceremony is delayed again as the State Secretariat had yet to issue a land-use permit for the area near Medan Merdeka. The groundbreaking ceremony for Phase 2 was finally held on 24 March 2019 and advanced works began in June 2019 near the future Monas station.

Site works for contract CP201 were originally planned to begin in March 2020. However, due to the COVID-19 pandemic, it was pushed back by three months to June 2020. Site works for contract CP203 began in September 2021. Site works for CP202 began in August 2022, after multiple delays in securing a bidder. Phase 2A will commence operations in 2028, and Phase 2B will follow suit four years later.

== Funding ==
Phase 1 was funded through soft loans by the JBIC, which now has merged to JICA. The loan tenor is 30 years and a grace period of 10 years. The first payment is made 10 years after signing the agreement. Payments last up to 30 years afterward with an interest rate of 0.25% per annum.

Meanwhile, phase II is funded by a loan with a similar scheme by JICA but with a tenor of 40 years. The first payment is made 10 years after signing the agreement. The interest charged is 0.1% on the first stage of payment. This funding also includes part of the funding for phase I due to budget shortfalls, one of which is used to implement updated government regulations on preventing the impact of earthquakes. The debt payment burden is divided into 49% by the Jakarta Provincial Government and 51% by the Directorate General of Railways.

== Network ==
=== Route ===
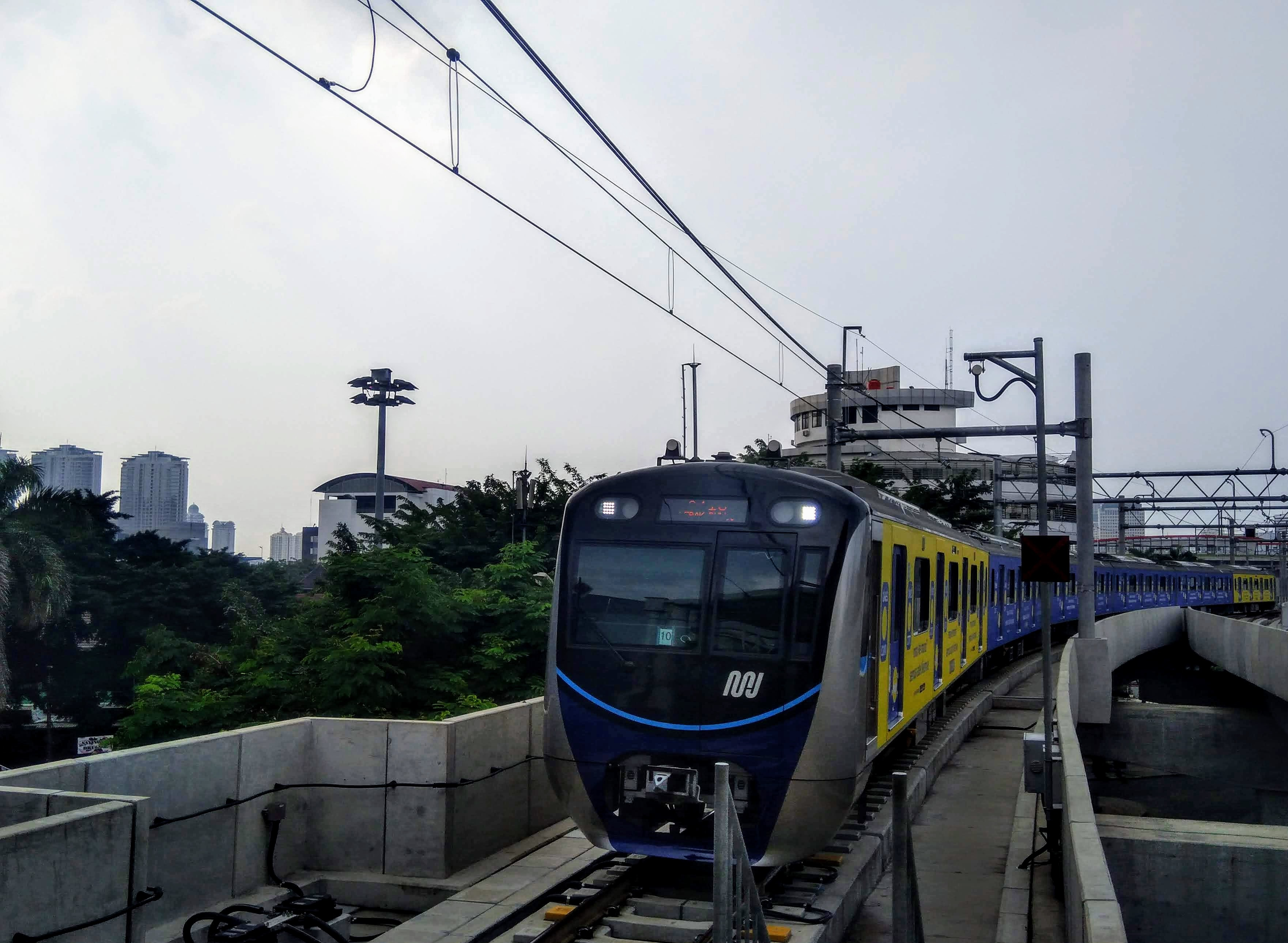
Jakarta MRT train departing from ASEAN Headquarters station and approaching Blok M station

The North–South line connects the Lebak Bulus region in South Jakarta with Ancol in North Jakarta. For now, only the 15.7 km (9.8 mi) section between Lebak Bulus Station and Bundaran Hotel Indonesia Station is operational. This line serves 13 stations (Note: It is planned that there will be 23 stations on the entire line.) with 7 elevated stations and 6 underground stations. (Note: It is planned that there will be a total of 16 underground stations on the entire line.) The elevated structure stretches for approximately 10 km (6.2 mi) from Lebak Bulus Station to ASEAN Headquarters Station. The underground line stretches for approximately 6 km (3.7 mi) from Senayan Station to Bundaran HI Station. The transition between elevated and underground lines is located between ASEAN Station and Senayan Station. This line is planned to intersect with the East–West Line at Thamrin Station.

=== Stations ===
The stations on the north–south line are generally uniformly designed. With the exception of Blok M station, all stations have two tracks.

The stations also have a number of supporting facilities, such as free WiFi and disabled-friendly toilets. In the concourse area, there are ATMs and various retail kiosks. In addition, there is also a nursing room and a prayer room. Each station is equipped with a flood barrier, so it is ensured that all stations are flood-free.

It is also planned that each station will be connected to a transit-oriented development area. One of them is the Dukuh Atas Station, which is connected to the KRL Commuterline and Soekarno–Hatta Airport Rail Link through the Dukuh Atas TOD. In addition, there are transit-oriented areas at Istora Senayan Station, Blok M, ASEAN, Fatmawati, and Lebak Bulus. The development of the TODs can take the form of building public facilities and housing around the station, as well as improving access to other modes of transportation.

==== List of stations ====
Region	Number	Station Name	Transfers/Notes		Elevation
Phase 2B (planned, operational by 2032)
North Jakarta	M22	Ancol		Ancol (planned)	Underground
North Jakarta	M21	Mangga Dua		Kampung Bandan (planned) Mangga Dua (planned)	Underground
Phase 2A (under construction, operational by 2029)
West Jakarta	M20	Kota		Future Phase 2A terminus Jakarta Kota (under construction) Kota (under construction)	Underground
West Jakarta	M19	Glodok		Glodok (under construction)	Underground
West Jakarta	M18	Mangga Besar		Mangga Besar (under construction)	Underground
Central Jakarta	M17	Sawah Besar		Sawah Besar (under construction)	Underground
Central Jakarta	M16	Harmoni		Harmoni (under construction)	Underground
Phase 2A (under construction, operational by 2027)
Central Jakarta	M15	Monas		Monas (under construction)	Underground
Central Jakarta	M14 TB25	Thamrin	MRT Line 2 (Jakarta Mass Rapid Transit)	Planned interchange station to East-West Line Kebon Sirih (under construction)	Underground
Phase 1
Central Jakarta	M13	Bundaran HI Bank Jakarta		Phase 1 terminus Bundaran HI Astra	Underground
Central Jakarta	M12	Dukuh Atas BNI		Sudirman BNI City Dukuh Atas BNI Dukuh Atas Galunggung	Underground
Central Jakarta	M11	Setiabudi Astra			Underground
Central Jakarta	M10	Bendungan Hilir			Underground
Central Jakarta	M09	Istora Mandiri		Polda Metro Jaya	Underground
Central Jakarta	M08	Senayan Mastercard		Bundaran Senayan	Underground
South Jakarta	M07	ASEAN Headquarters		Initially named 'Sisingamangaraja' Masjid Agung ASEAN Kejaksaan Agung CSW 1	Elevated
South Jakarta	M06	Blok M BCA		Blok M Blok M Bus Terminal (via short walk)	Elevated
South Jakarta	M05	Blok A Visa			Elevated
South Jakarta	M04	Haji Nawi			Elevated
South Jakarta	M03	Cipete Raya Tuku			Elevated
South Jakarta	M02	Fatmawati Indomaret		Planned interchange station to	Elevated
South Jakarta	M01	Lebak Bulus Bank Syariah Indonesia		Terminal station Lebak Bulus Lebak Bulus Bus Terminal (via short walk)	Elevated

== Rolling stock ==
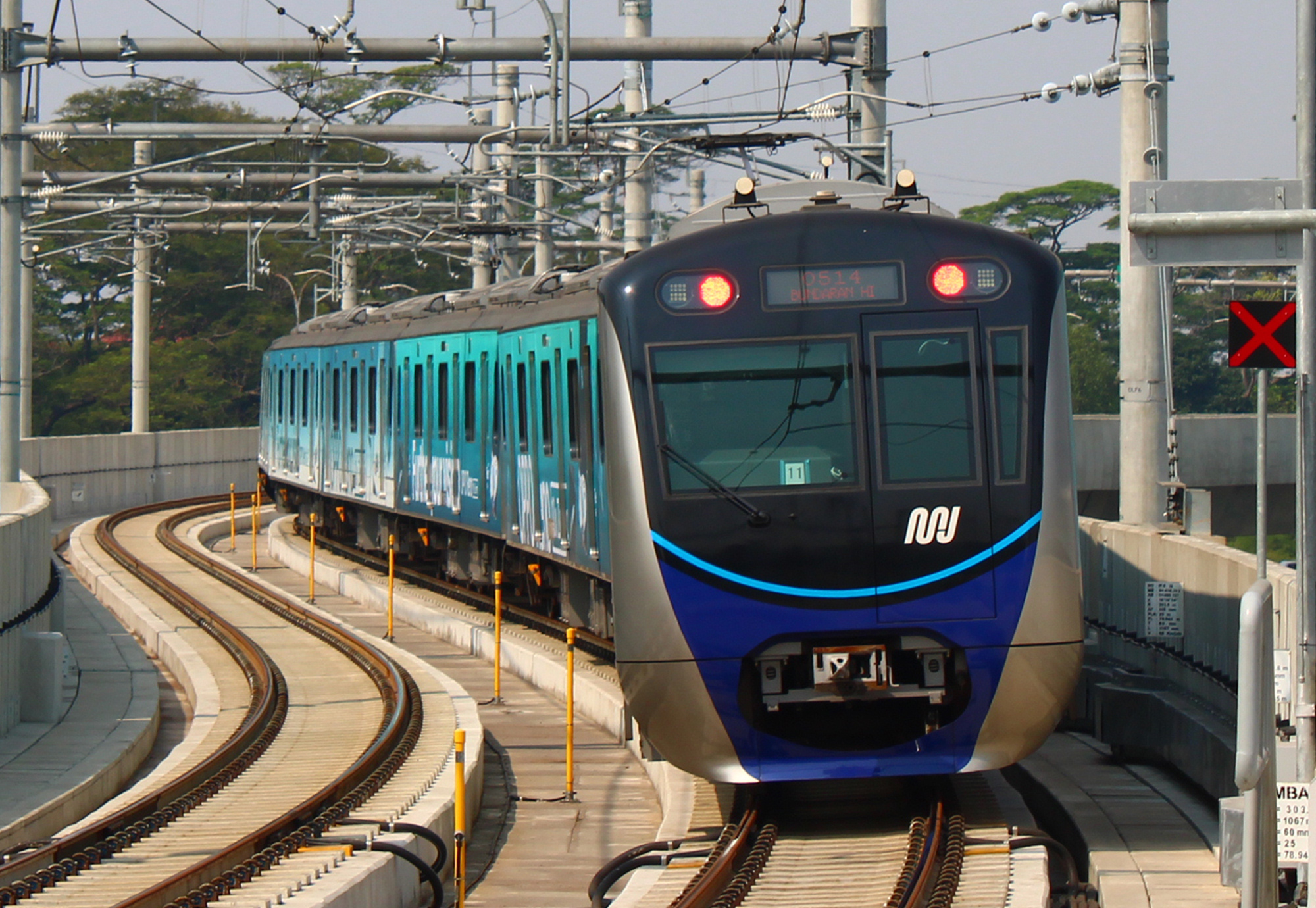
Jakarta MRT set 11 departing from Haji Nawi station

The North–South line of the Jakarta MRT uses a fleet made by the Nippon Sharyo consortium from Japan which and known as "Ratangga". The fleet consists of 16 trains, each with six carriages. Each carriage has four doors on either side, except for the first and last carriages which have driver's cabins. Work on building the trains started in 2015 and they began to be delivered to Indonesia in 2018. The trains began to fully operate in conjunction with the inauguration of the line on March 24, 2019.

An additional eight sets (under Contract Package CP 206) will be added to the trains for the second phase leading to Ancol.

== Incidents ==
- On November 3, 2017, an MRT line barrier fell. The incident occurred at around 10:00 pm at the intersection between Jalan Panglima Polim and Jalan Wijaya II. This incident resulted in a motorcyclist being injured and hitting a car. This incident was caused by an unbalanced crane when lifting a parapet wall. The parapet concrete that was lifted then fell from the construction site on the flyover. It was found out after the investigation, the contractor did not follow the appropriate lifting method with the crane arm being too long and the lack of supervision from the supervisor. In addition, the lack of traffic security at the time of the incident was the cause of the victims. The Corporate Secretary of PT MRT Jakarta, Tubagus Hikmatullah said that traffic security has been carried out on some roads. However, the concrete barrier fell outside the safe area of traffic restrictions because it was first caught by the crane before it actually fell onto the road.
- On May 30, 2024, an iron beam held by tower crane machine from construction project of the new building of Kejaksaan Agung RI (English: Attorney General's Office of Indonesia) fell onto the tracks when a trainset was passing near Blok M station, causing fire sparks and power outage of the trainset. The service of the entire North–South Line was temporarily halted to evacuate the iron beam and check the condition of tracks and signaling. No human victims were reported and all passengers of each operating trainset were evacuated to the nearest station. The investigation reported that the crane machine suddenly lost power and lost grip of the beam due to electromagnetic induction caused by the trainset passing nearby, thus the beam was pulled onto the tracks by electromagnetic force. PT Hutama Karya (Corp) which was responsible for the construction project apologised for the accident and agreed with PT MRT Jakarta to increase safe area of the crane to at least 8 meters from the MRT area, up from previously agreed 6 meters. The North–South Line returned to normal service the next day.
