= Bundaran HI Bank Jakarta MRT station =

MRT station in Jakarta, Indonesia

M13 Bundaran HI Bank Jakarta
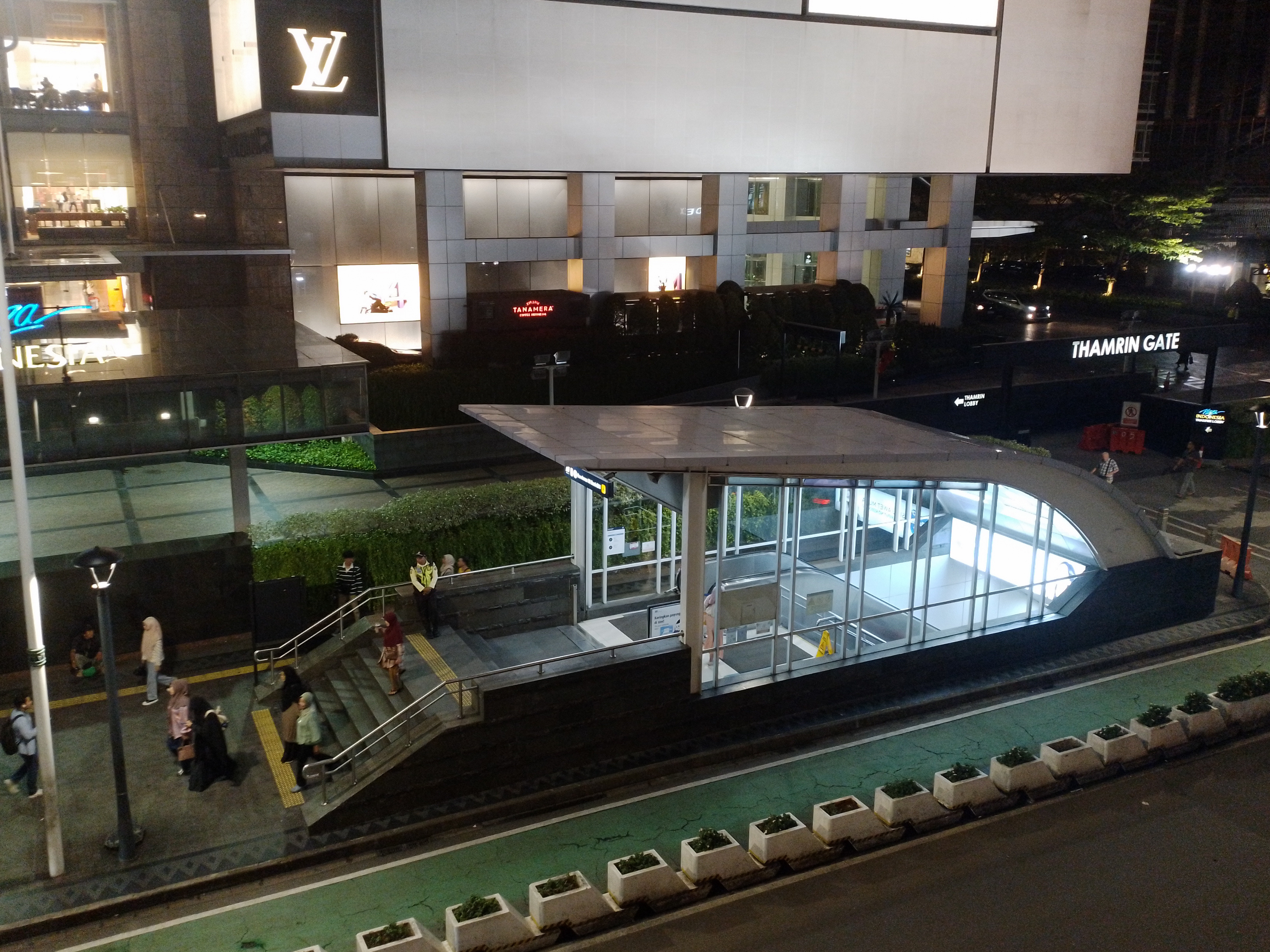
- One of the entrances of the station, located next to the Plaza Indonesia mall

General information
- Location: Jl. Mohammad Husni Thamrin Kav. 17-136, Gondangdia, Menteng, Central Jakarta; Jakarta; Indonesia
- Coordinates: 6.1934095°S 106.8228579°E
- Owner: MRT Jakarta
- Operator: MRT Jakarta
- Line: North–South Line
- Platforms: single island platform
- Tracks: 2
- Connections: Bundaran HI Astra

Construction
- Structure type: Underground
- Accessible: Available

Other information
- Station code: BHI

History
- Opened: 24 March 2019; 7 years ago

Services
| Preceding station | Jakarta MRT | Following station |
|---|---|---|
| Dukuh Atas BNI towards Lebak Bulus | North-South Line | Terminus |
Route map
Location
- Location within Jakarta

Bundaran HI Station (or Bundaran HI Bank Jakarta Station, with Bank Jakarta granted for naming rights) is an underground rapid transit station on the North-South Line of the Jakarta MRT in Central Jakarta, Jakarta, Indonesia. Located nearby the Hotel Indonesia (HI) Roundabout (Indonesian: Bundaran Hotel Indonesia (HI)), it is currently the terminus of the North-South Line, as the phase 2 construction of the line is underway.

The station is located in the Gondangdia area of Menteng, Central Jakarta and is built underneath Jalan M.H. Thamrin. Jakarta MRT users can continue their journey with Transjakarta's Corridor 1 service from this station via the Bundaran HI bus stop located above. This connection with Transjakarta is in the form of stairs so it is not disabled friendly.

== History ==
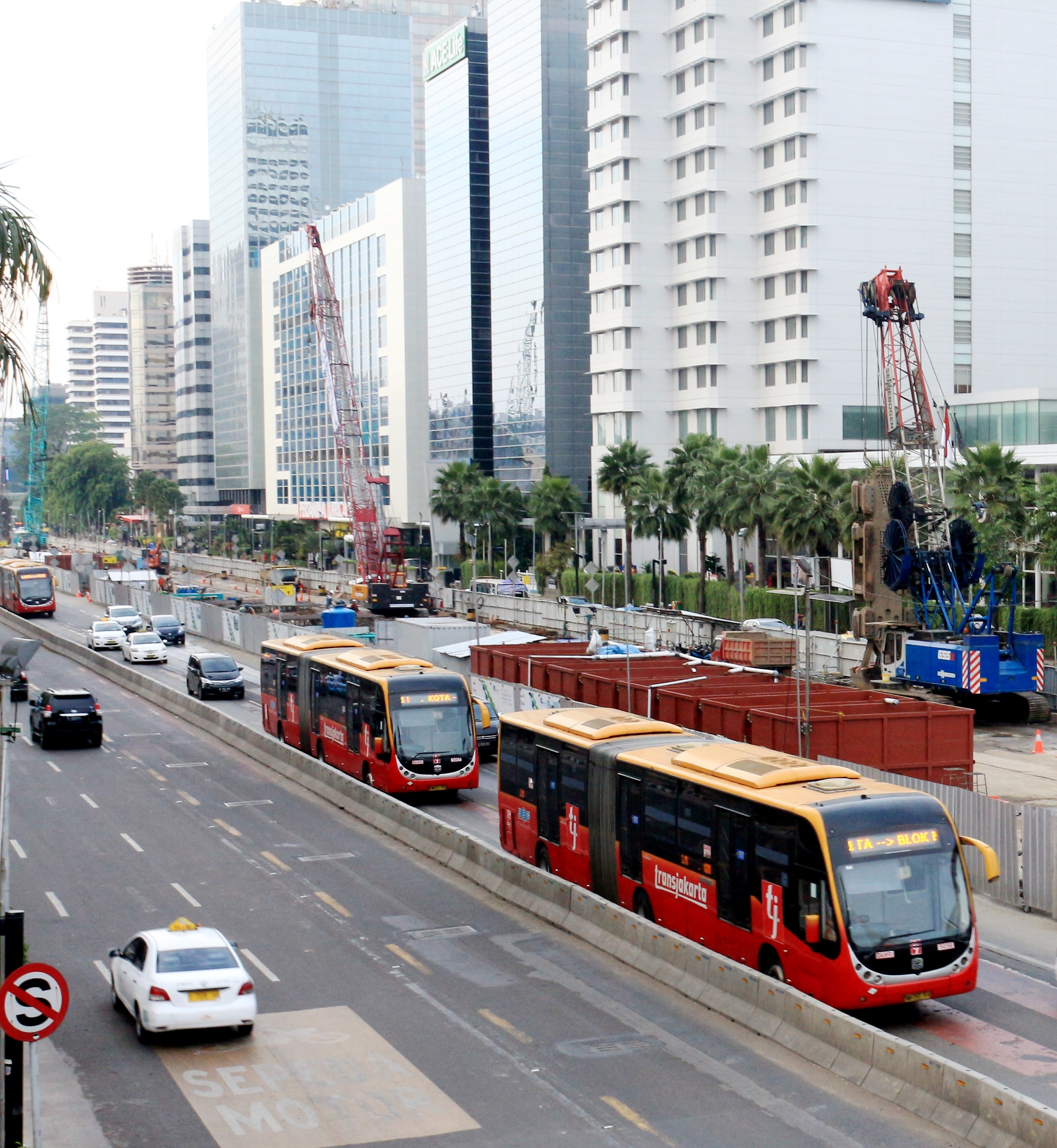
Construction of the MRT station in November 2014

The MRT station opened on 24 March 2019, along with the rest of Phase 1 of the Jakarta MRT. At the same time, the newly rebuilt Transjakarta BRT station of the same name was opened and connected with stairs to the underground MRT station, but there is no direct connection that is accessible for people with disabilities.

An extension work for the concourse area is now on process to add new entrances and to create direct connection to the nearby buildings including Plaza Indonesia and Grand Hyatt Jakarta. The extension is expected to be finished by 2027. In the future, underground links from the station to Hotel Indonesia, Grand Indonesia and Mandarin Oriental Jakarta will be constructed.

== Naming rights ==
On 8 October 2024, a naming right for Bundaran HI station was bought by the municipal-owned banking company, PT. Bank DKI (then trading as 'Bank DKI'), thus officially named as Bundaran HI Bank DKI. As Bank DKI was rebranded into 'Bank Jakarta' on 22 June 2025, coinciding with Jakarta's 498th anniversary, the brand name of the station was renamed into Bundaran HI Bank Jakarta around July 2025, in accordance of the rebranding.

== Station layout ==
The station only has two railroad tracks equipped with a buffer stop and a railroad switch on the south side. The switch is used to move MRT trains that were originally on the left track to the right, or vice versa.

Ground
Road
Entrance and exit
B1
Concourse
Ticket gates, ticket machines, counters and retail kiosks
B2

Platform

Platform 1
North–South route to Lebak Bulus (←)
Island platform, doors open on the left side
Platform 2
North–South route to Lebak Bulus (←)

== Places of interest ==
- Hotel Indonesia
- Selamat Datang Monument
- Grand Indonesia
  - BCA Tower
- Plaza Indonesia
  - Grand Hyatt Jakarta
  - The Plaza
  - The Keraton
- Indonesia One Tower
- Wisma Nusantara
- Deutsche Bank
- Embassy of Belgium
- Embassy of Japan
- Sinar Mas Land Plaza
- Graha Mandiri
- Thamrin City
- Pullman Jakarta Indonesia Thamrin CBD
- Thamrin City Amaris Hotel

== In popular culture ==
Bundaran HI Station become the inspiration of the 2019 popular pop song by Indonesian musician Glenn Fredly, "Stasiun Bundaran HI".

== Incidents ==
During the Jakarta protest of the Omnibus Law on Job Creation on 8 October 2020, Bundaran HI Station was one of the targets of destruction as well as the Transjakarta Bundaran HI bus station. Some entrances had broken glass and paintbrush writing.

== Gallery ==
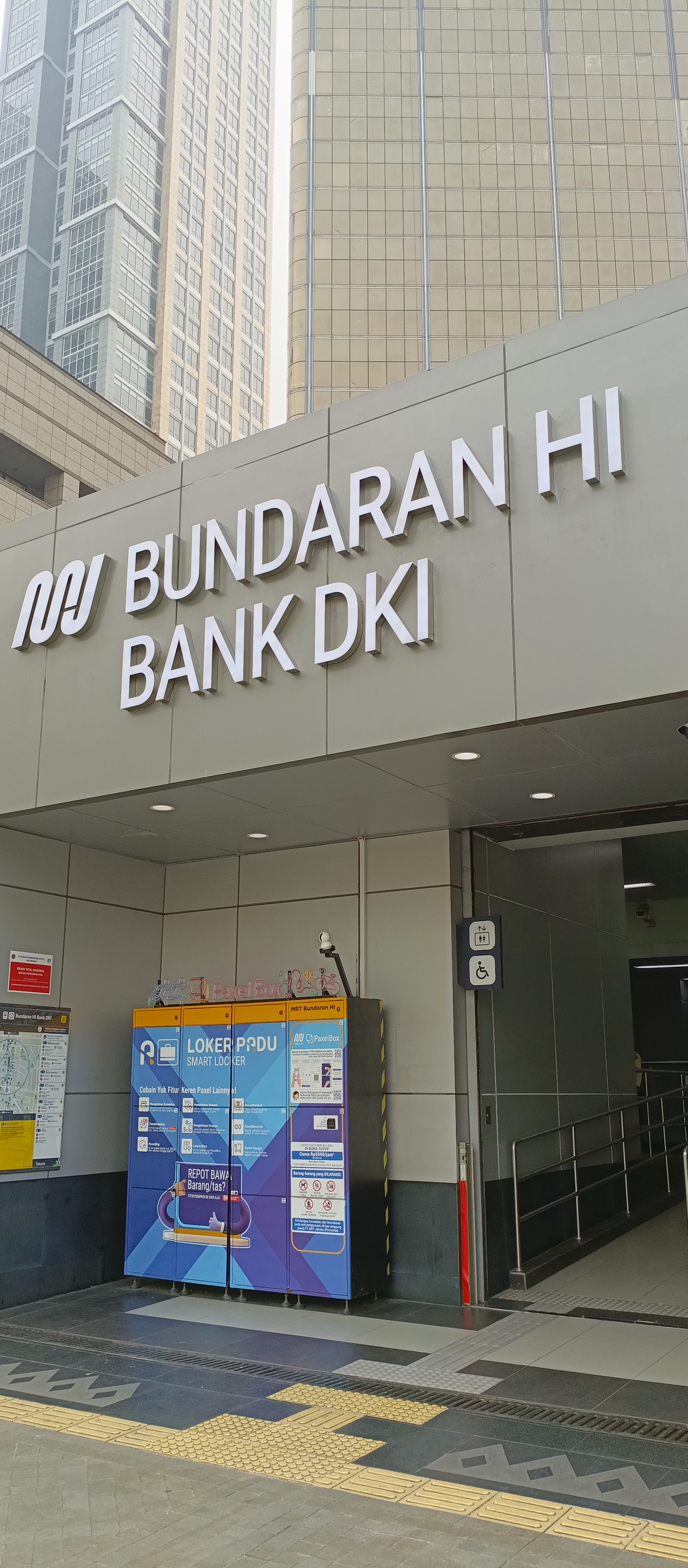
One of the station's entrances next to the Japanese Embassy

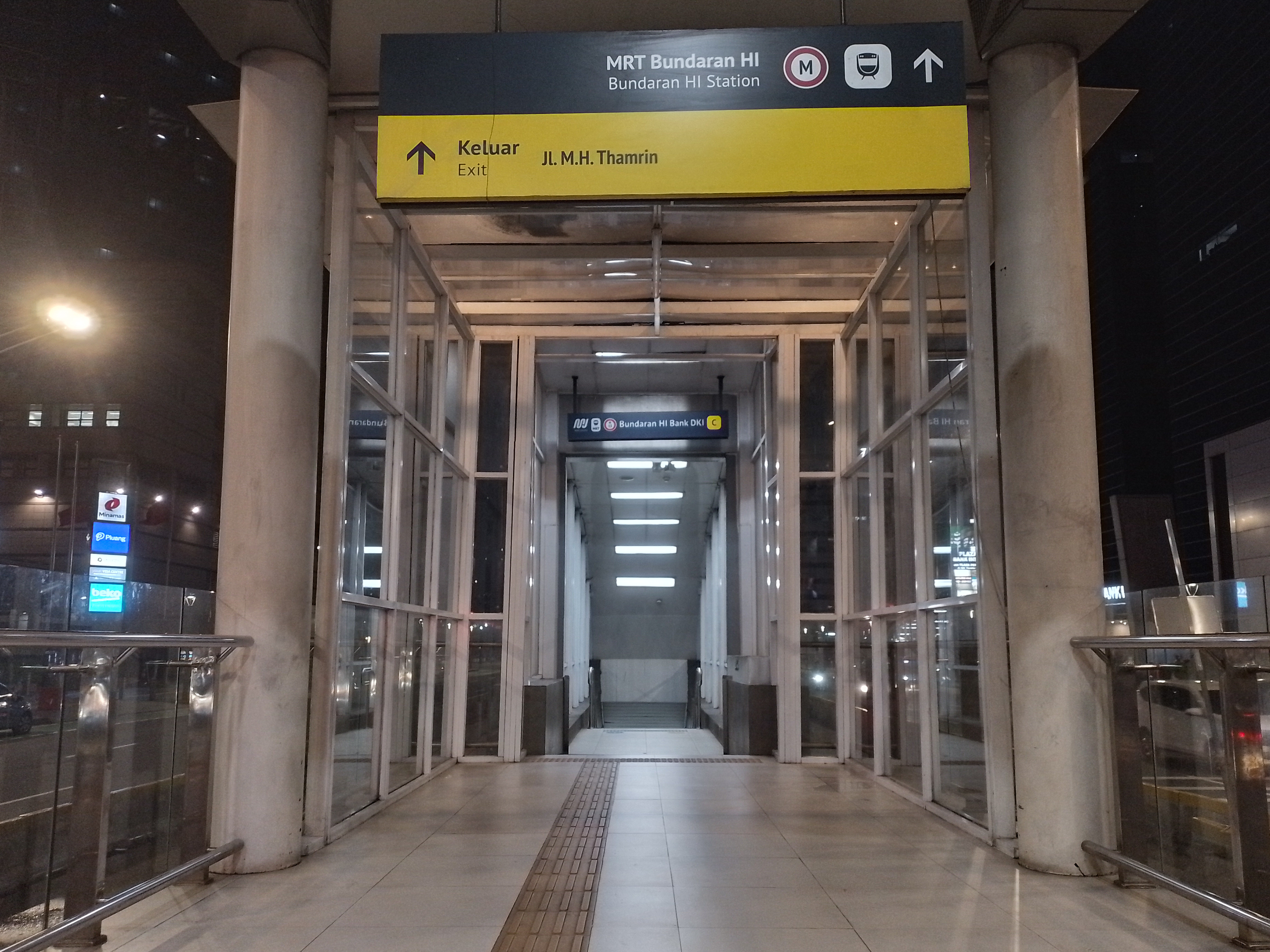
Integrated access from the MRT station to the Bundaran HI Astra Transjakarta BRT station.

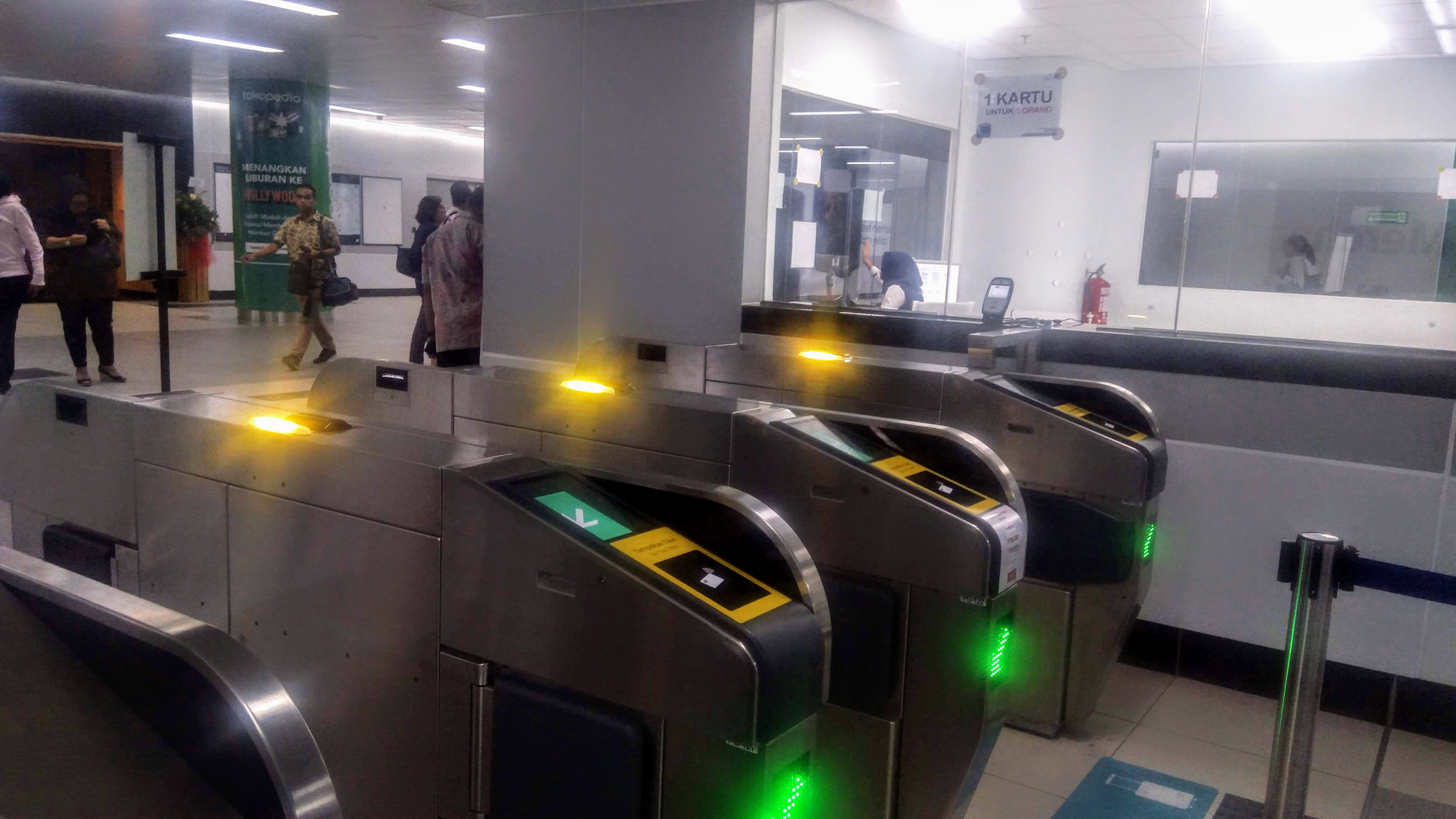
Fare gates of the station

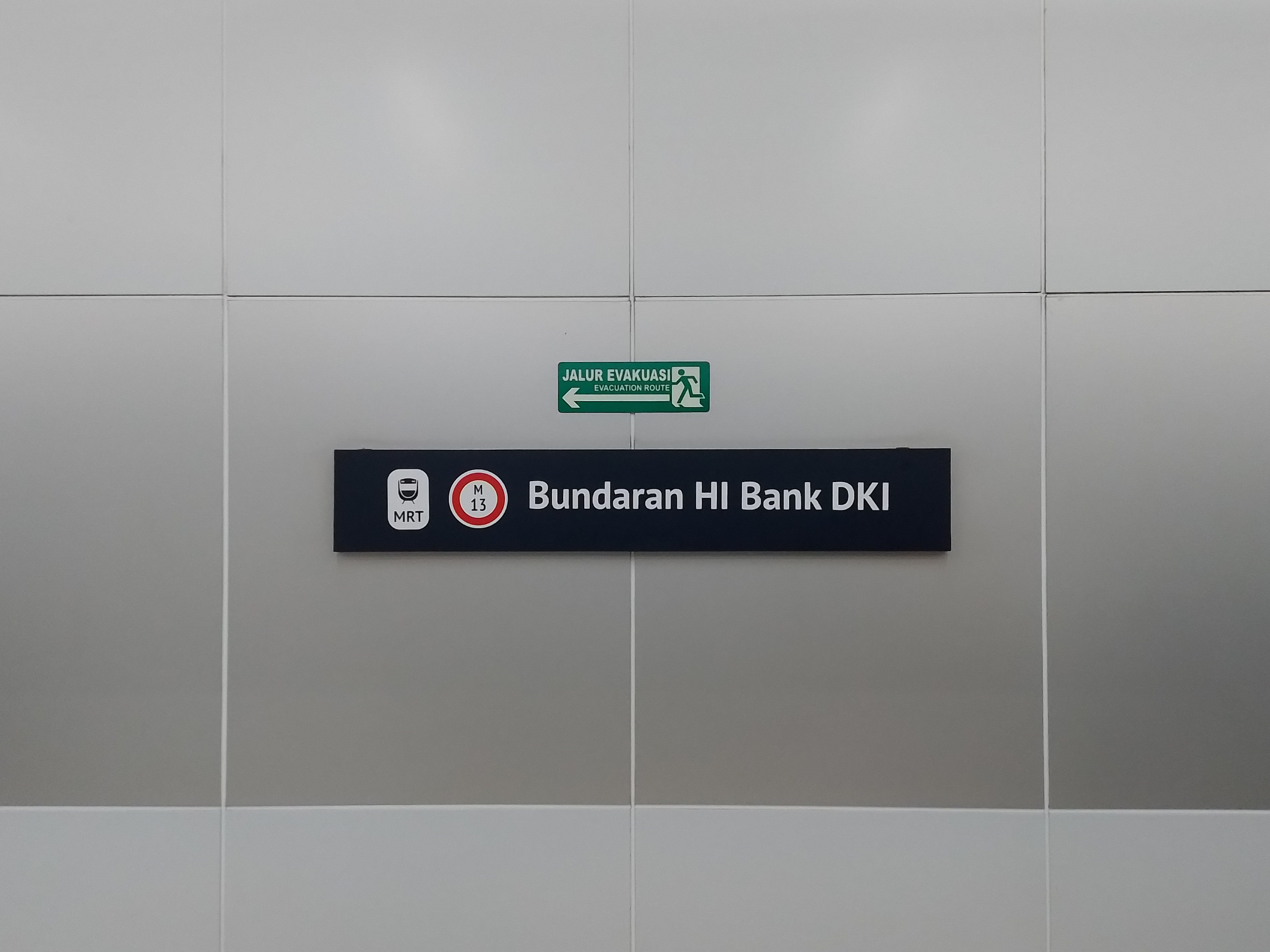
The station signage, when it was named as Bundaran HI Bank DKI

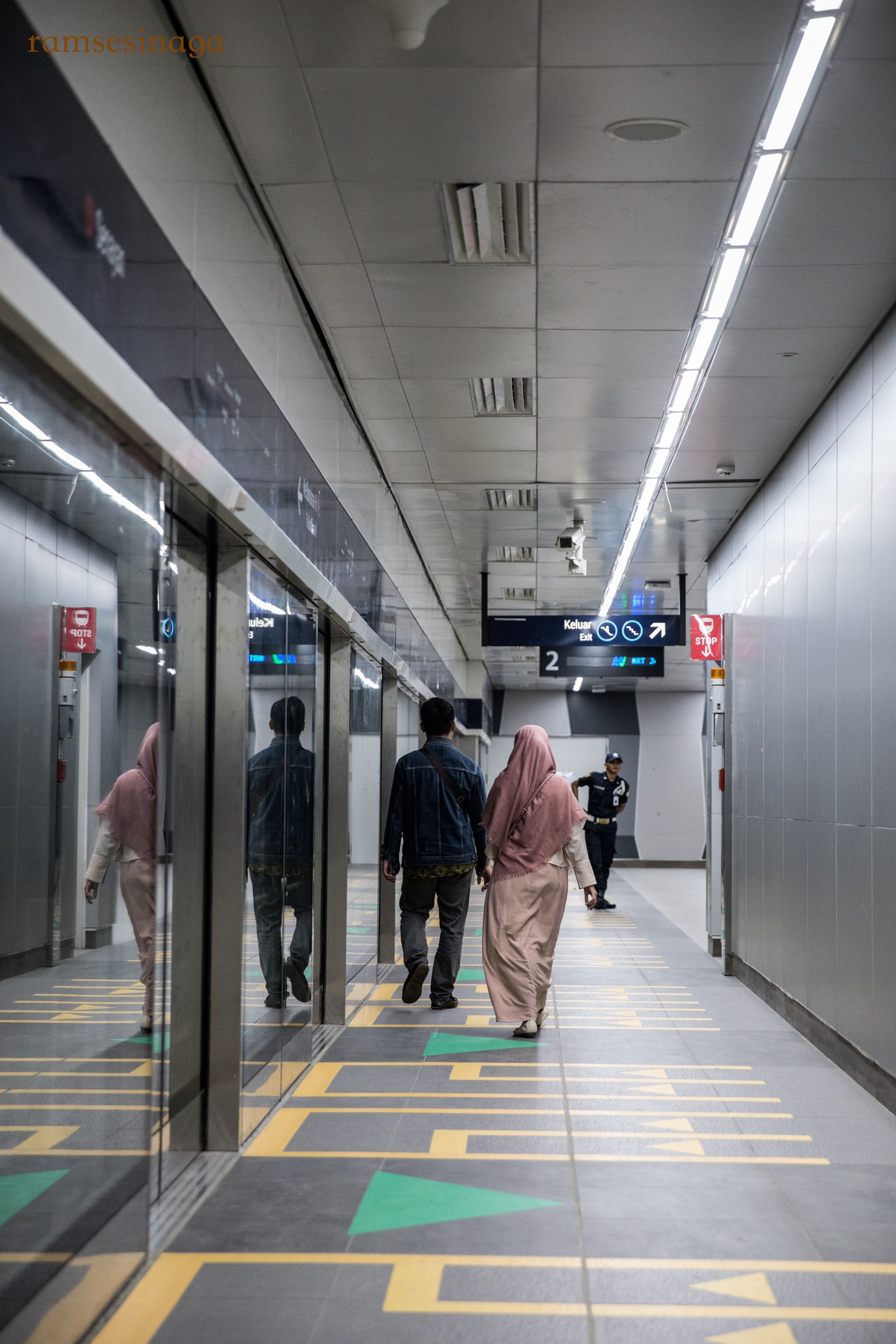
The platform screen doors of the station

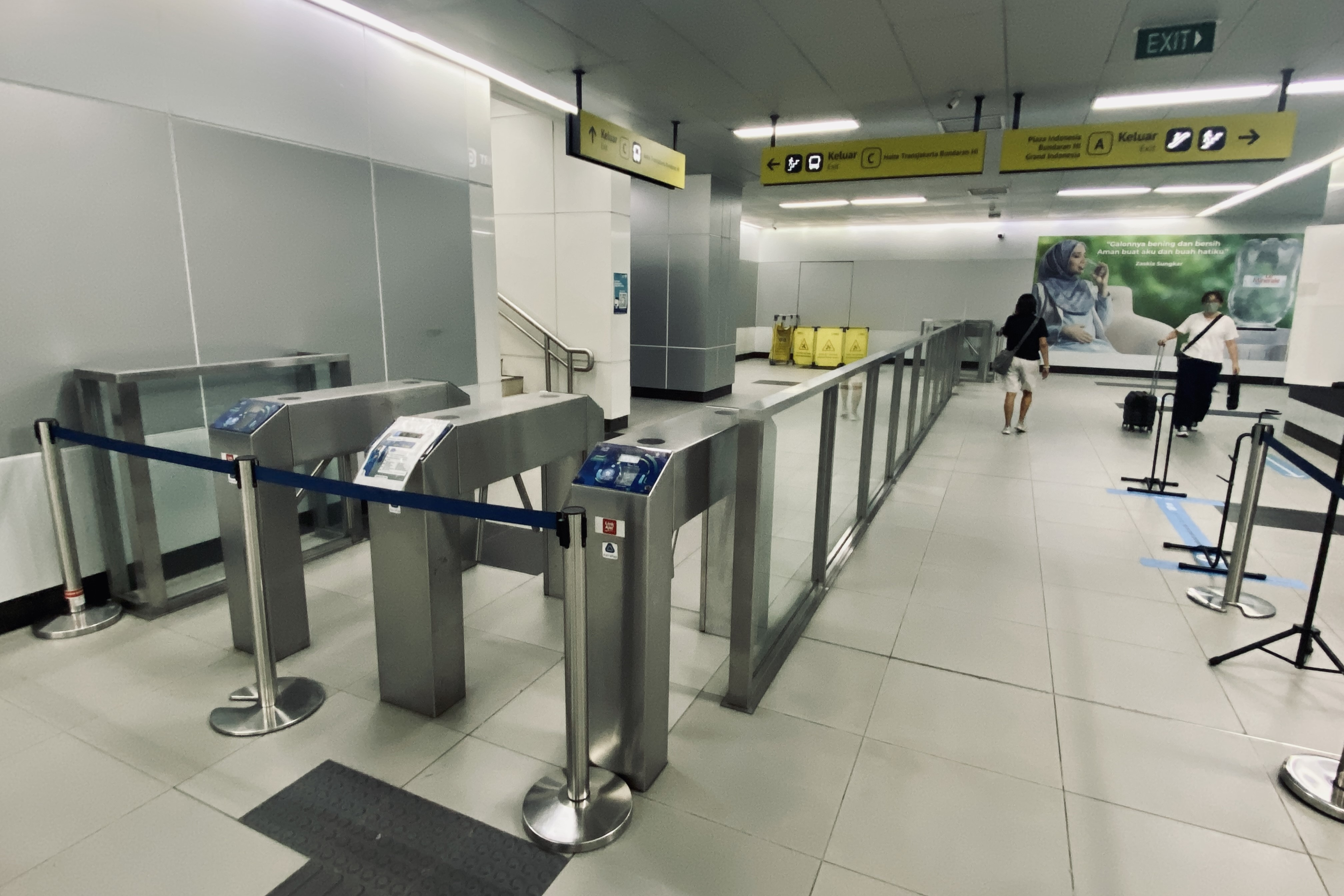
Access and fare gates to the Bundaran HI Astra BRT station.

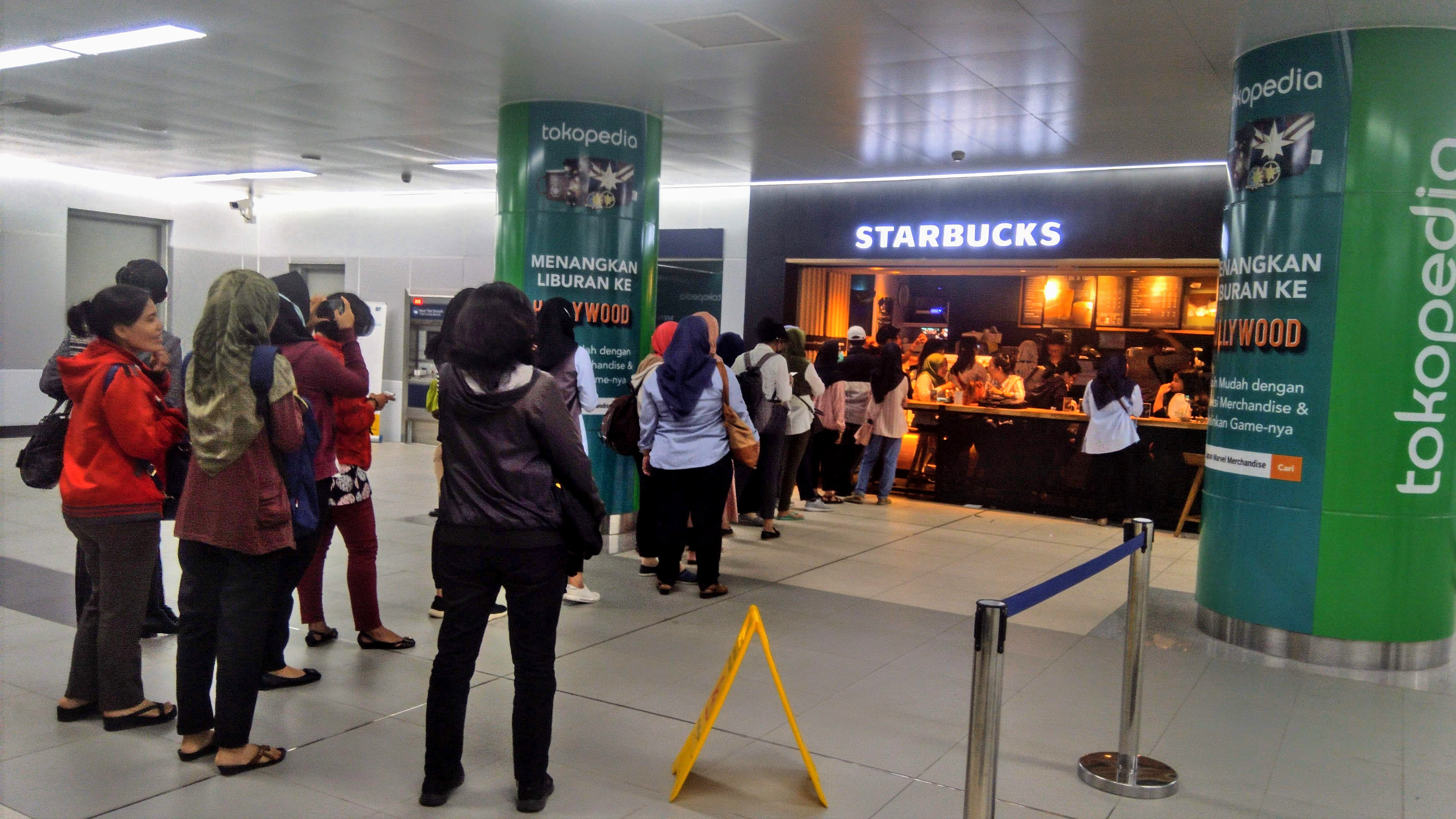
Cafe at station concourse

== See also ==
- Bundaran HI Astra, a Transjakarta bus station above this MRT station
