= Lebak Bulus Bank Syariah Indonesia MRT station =

MRT station in Jakarta, Indonesia

M01 Lebak Bulus Bank Syariah Indonesia
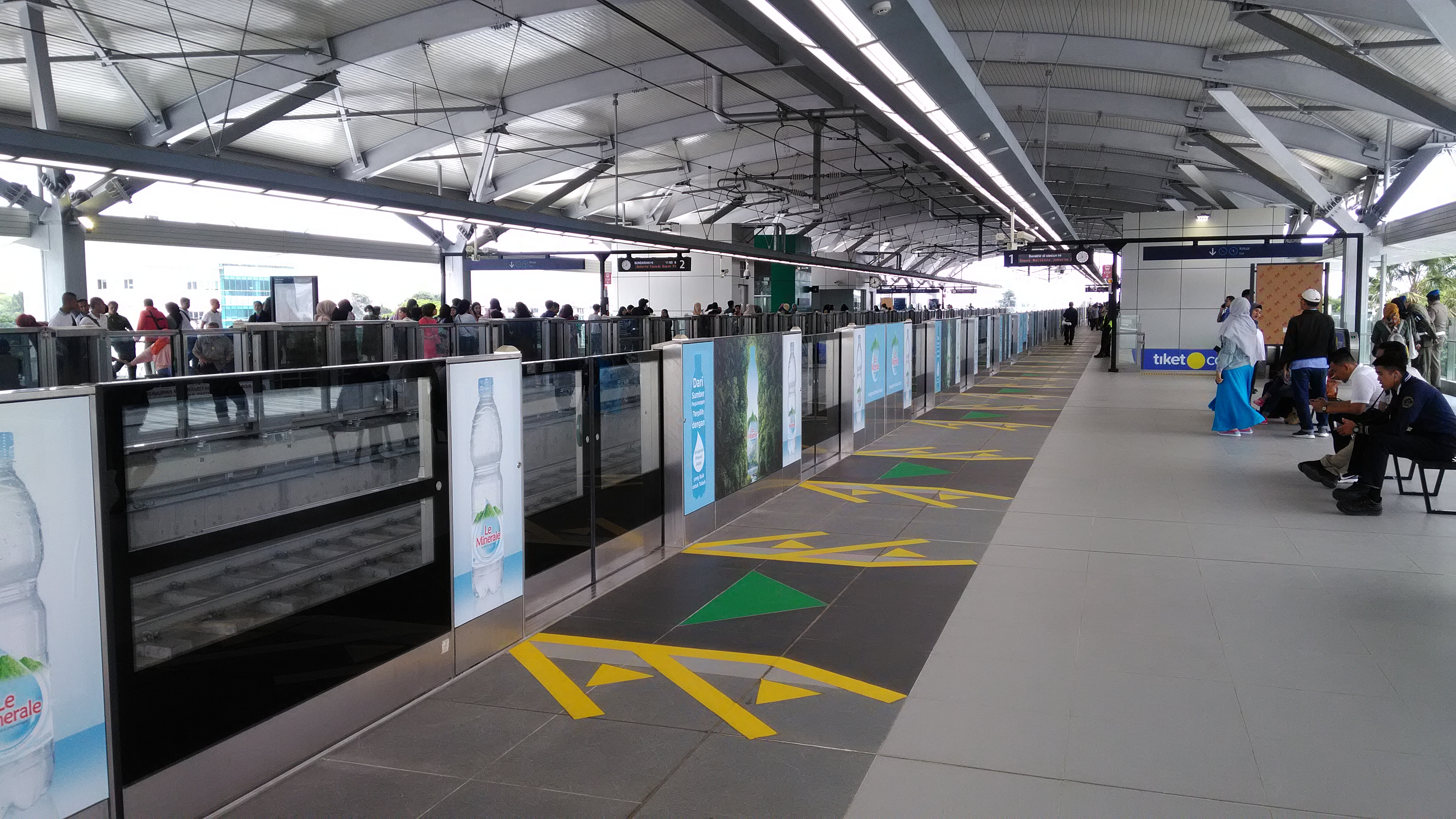
- The platform area

General information
- Location: Jl. Lebak Bulus Raya no. 38, Lebak Bulus, Cilandak, South Jakarta; Jakarta; Indonesia
- Coordinates: 6.289254°S 106.774937°E
- Owner: MRT Jakarta
- Operator: MRT Jakarta
- Line: North–South line
- Platforms: 2 side platforms
- Tracks: 2
- Connections: Lebak Bulus

Construction
- Structure type: Elevated
- Parking: Available
- Accessible: Available

Other information
- Station code: LBB

History
- Opened: 24 March 2019; 7 years ago

Services
Preceding station	Jakarta MRT	Following station
Terminus	North-South Line	Fatmawati Indomaret towards Bundaran HI Bank Jakarta
Route map
Location
- Location within Jakarta

Lebak Bulus MRT Station (or Lebak Bulus Bank Syariah Indonesia MRT Station, with Bank Syariah Indonesia granted for naming rights) is a rapid transit station on the North-South Line of the Jakarta MRT in Jakarta, Indonesia. The station is located in Lebak Bulus, Cilandak, South Jakarta and has only two railway lines, both of which are straight lines. The station is located not far from Lebak Bulus Terminal. MRT Jakarta users can also continue their journey with the Transjakarta Corridor 8 bus rapid transit service via the Lebak Bulus BRT station. Located in the South Jakarta, it is the terminus of the North-South Line, however the track does continue east, towards Lebak Bulus Depot as a maintenance facility for the Jakarta MRT train, which is located on the former Lebak Bulus Stadium land.

== Location ==
The southernmost station on the Jakarta MRT North-South Line, Lebak Bulus Station lies within South Jakarta, Jakarta. More specifically, it is located on Jl. Lebak Bulus Raya in Cilandak. This station is located near Lebak Bulus bus terminal, Poins Square shopping centre, and Transmart Lebak Bulus supermarket.

== History ==
The station opened on 24 March 2019, along with the rest of Phase 1 of the Jakarta MRT. The station would be the starting point of a proposed Phase 5 of the Jakarta MRT, servicing the Tangerang area.

== Naming rights ==
In 2019, at the early operational of the MRT, ridesharing company Grab Holdings granted the naming rights of Lebak Bulus station; thus, it was officially named Lebak Bulus Grab. The 5-year contract cost about IDR 33 billion. Aside of that, the company had built an online motorcycle taxi (ojek online, ojol) shelter nearby the station. The naming right contract ended in 2024, and Grab decided not to extend it.

On 10 December 2025, a second naming right was afforded by Bank Syariah Indonesia, making it officially named Lebak Bulus Bank Syariah Indonesia.

== Station layout ==
3rd floor Platform	Side platform, the doors are opened on the left side
3rd floor Platform	Platform 1	North South Line to Bundaran HI Bank Jakarta (→)
3rd floor Platform	Platform 2	North South Line to Bundaran HI Bank Jakarta (→)
3rd floor Platform	Side platform, the doors are opened on the right side
2nd floor	Concourse	Ticket gates, ticket machines, counters and retail kiosks
1st floor	Street	Entrances and exits, Lebak Bulus BRT station

== Gallery ==
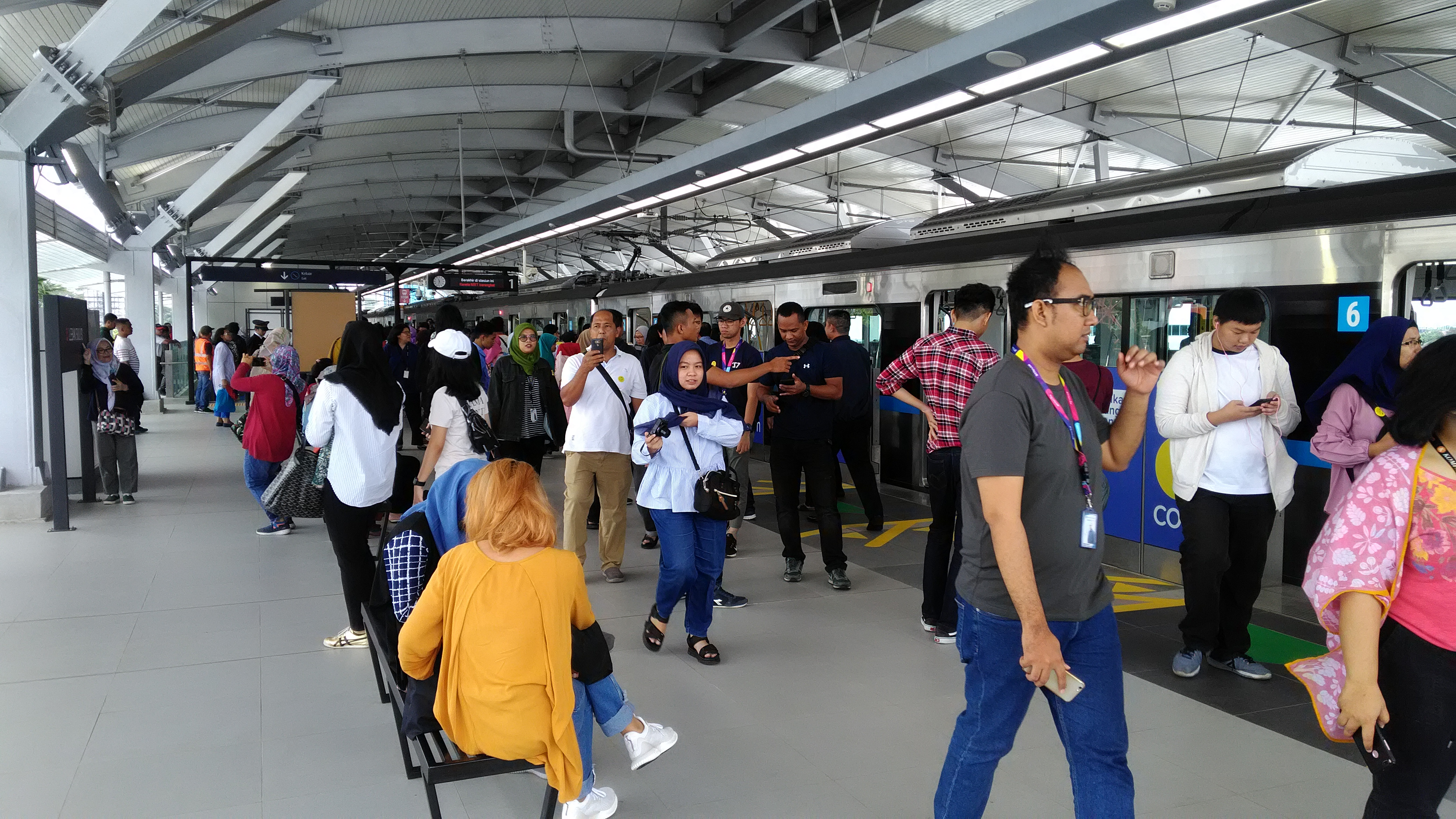
Crowd at the platform level

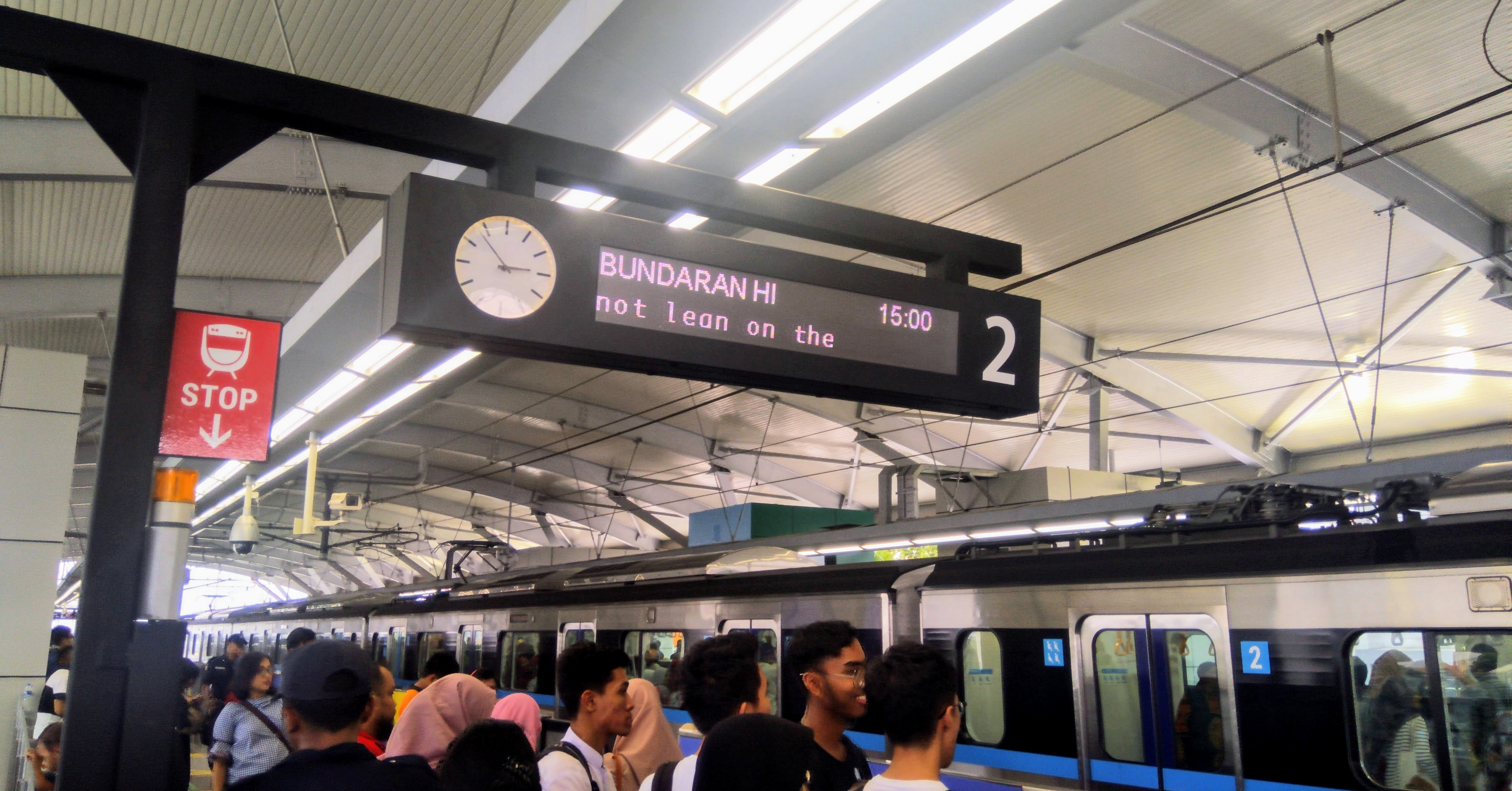
Jakarta MRT passengers waiting for the train

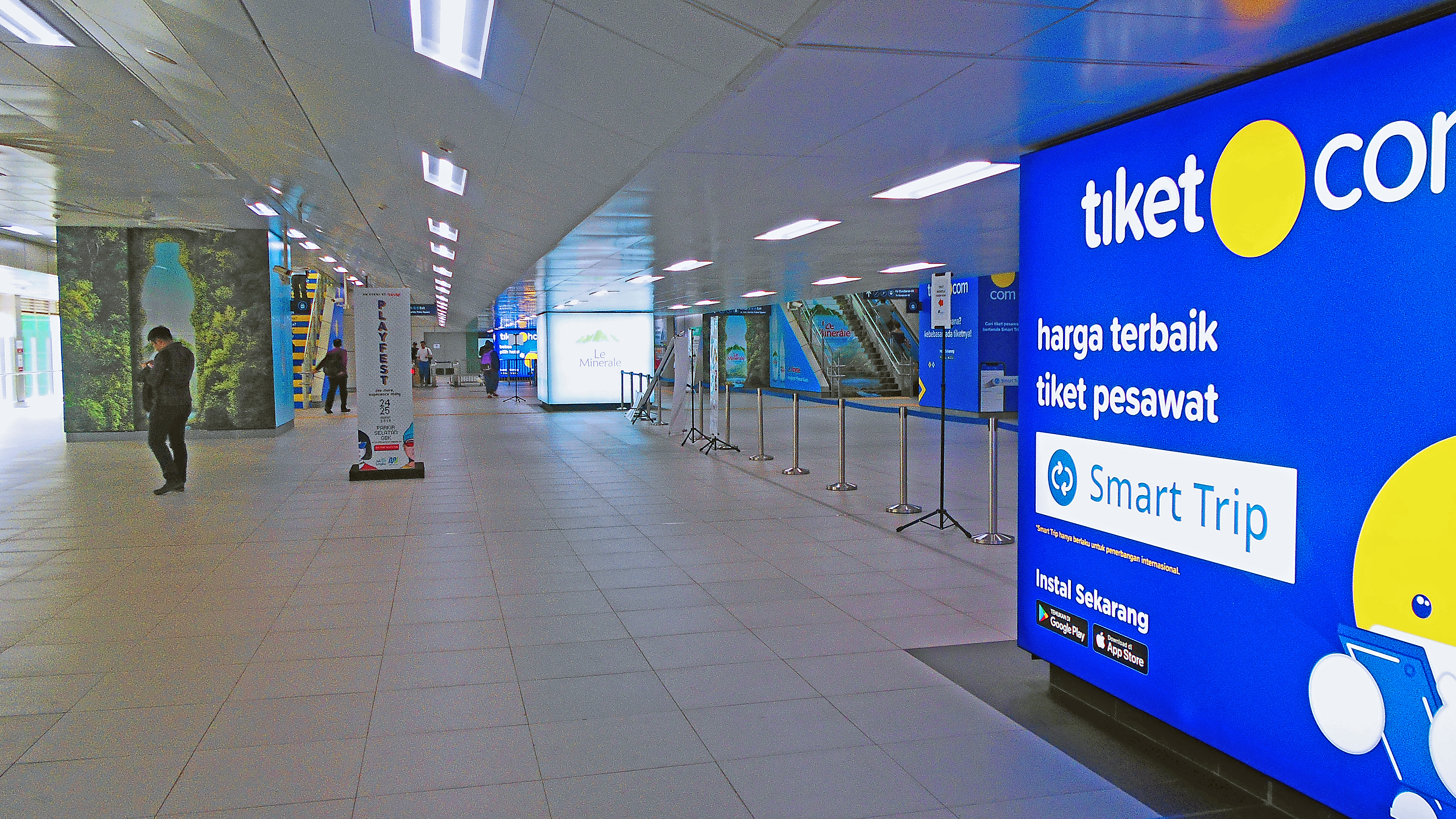
Concourse area

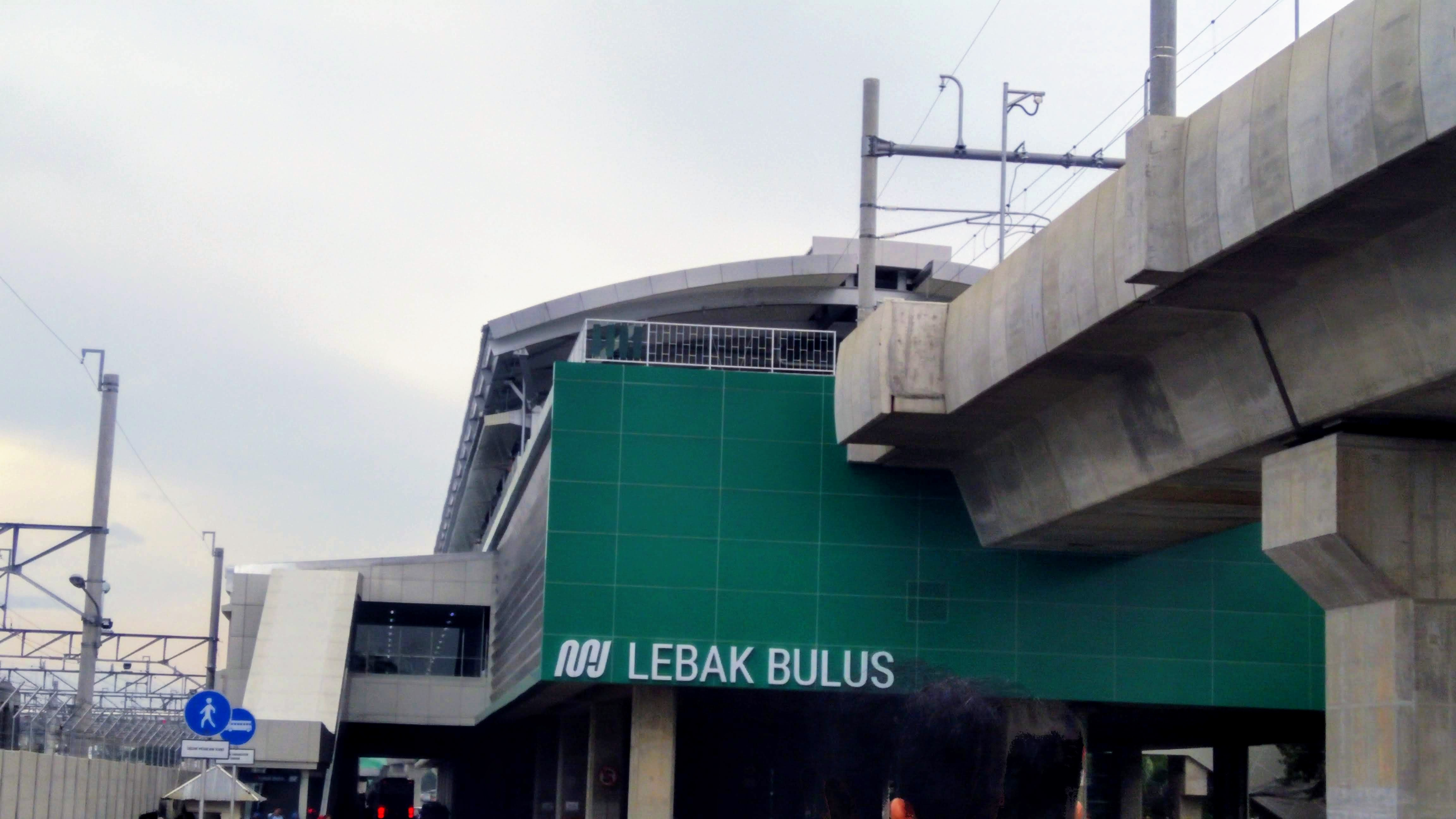
Front view of Lebak Bulus MRT Station, 2019

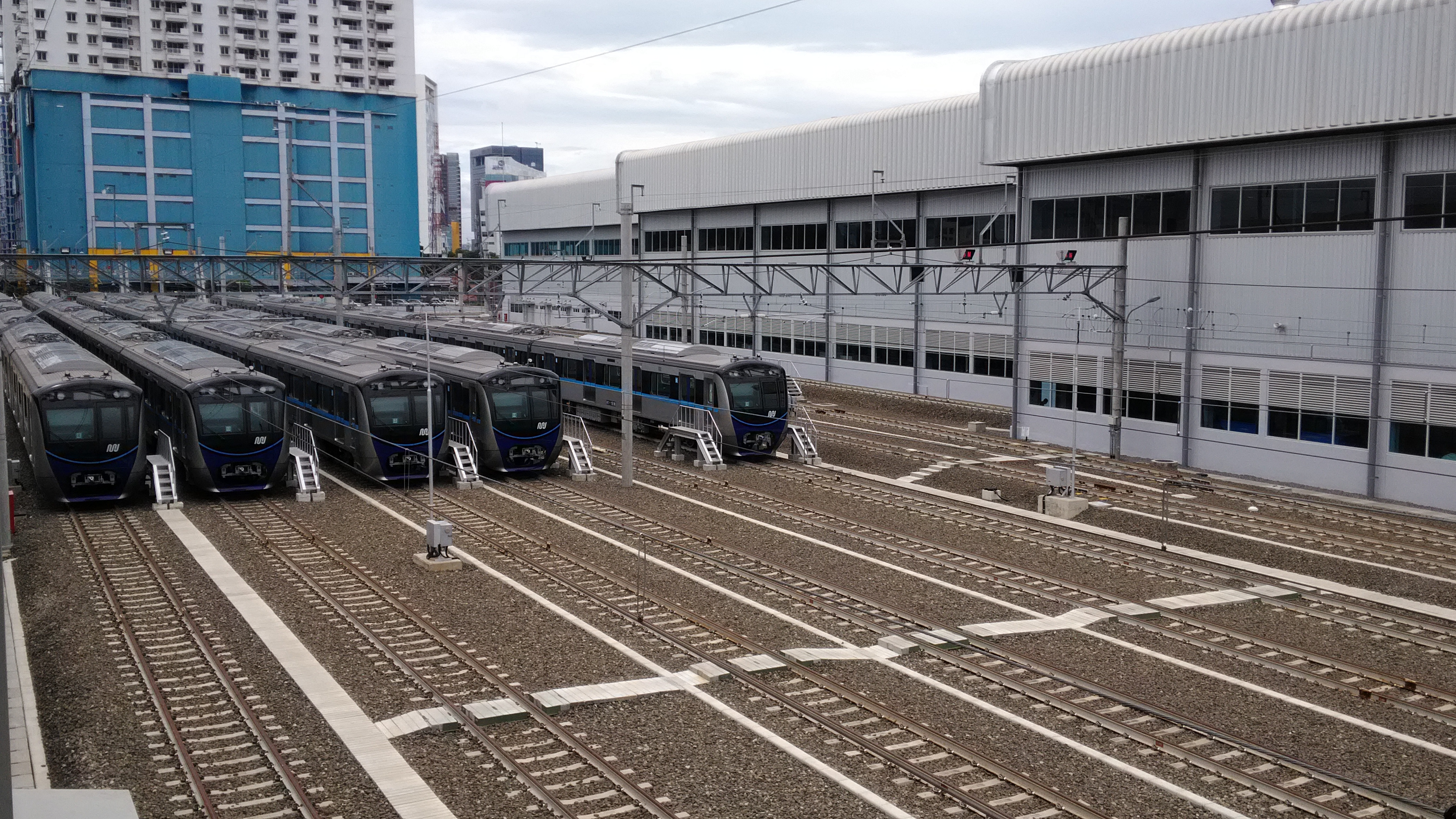
View of Lebak Bulus MRT Depot from the station, 2019
