= Cipete Raya Tuku MRT station =

MRT station in Jakarta, Indonesia

M03 Cipete Raya TUKU
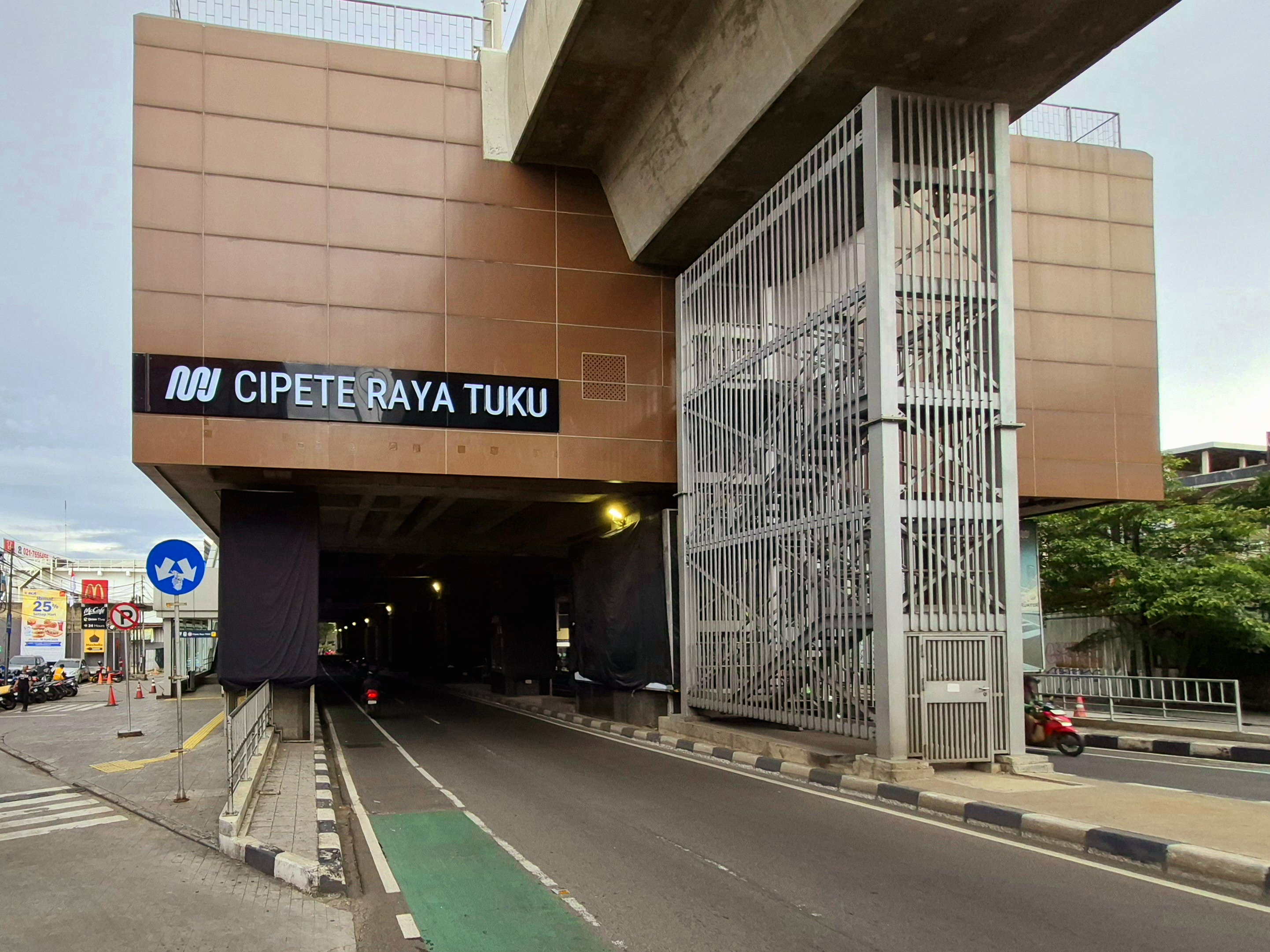
- The Cipete Raya MRT Station facade

General information
- Location: Jalan RS Fatmawati 15, Gandaria Selatan, Cilandak; South Jakarta, Jakarta; Indonesia
- Coordinates: 6.2774°S 106.7975°E
- Owner: MRT Jakarta
- Operator: MRT Jakarta
- Line: North–South line
- Platforms: two side platforms
- Tracks: 2

Construction
- Structure type: Elevated
- Parking: Available
- Accessible: Available

Other information
- Station code: CPR

History
- Opened: 24 March 2019; 7 years ago

Services
| Preceding station | Jakarta MRT | Following station |
|---|---|---|
| Fatmawati Indomaret towards Lebak Bulus | North-South Line | Haji Nawi towards Bundaran HI Bank Jakarta |
Route map
Location
- Location within Jakarta

Cipete Raya MRT Station (or Cipete Raya TUKU MRT Station, with Kopi Tuku granted for naming rights) is a rapid transit station on the North-South Line of the Jakarta MRT in Jakarta, Indonesia. The station is located on Jalan RS Fatmawati, Gandaria Selatan, Cilandak, South Jakarta, between Haji Nawi and Fatmawati Indomaret stations, and has the station code CPR.

Close to the station is Jalan Cipete Raya (Cipete Raya Street), hence its name.

== History ==
Cipete Raya Station was officially opened, along with the rest of Phase 1 of the Jakarta MRT on 24 March 2019.

== Naming rights ==
On 12 January 2025, detik.com reported that the Jakarta MRT has granted the naming right of the station to Kopi Tuku (stylized as TUKU), a local-based coffee shop franchise owned by PT. Makna Agan Karya Andanu, by putting the brand name into the station's name. The naming rights was inaugurated on 28 January.

== Station layout ==
| 3rd floor Platform | Side platform, the doors are opened on the right side |
| 3rd floor Platform | Platform 1 | North South Line to Lebak Bulus (←) |
| 3rd floor Platform | Platform 2 | North South Line to Bundaran HI (→) |
| 3rd floor Platform | Side platform, the doors are opened on the right side |
| 2nd floor | Concourse | Ticket gates, ticket machines, counters and retail kiosks |
| 1st floor | Street | Entrances and exits |

== Places of interest ==
- Lotte Mart Fatmawati
- Urban Forest City Park
- Local Indonesian food stalls
- Consulate General of the Solomon Islands

== Gallery ==
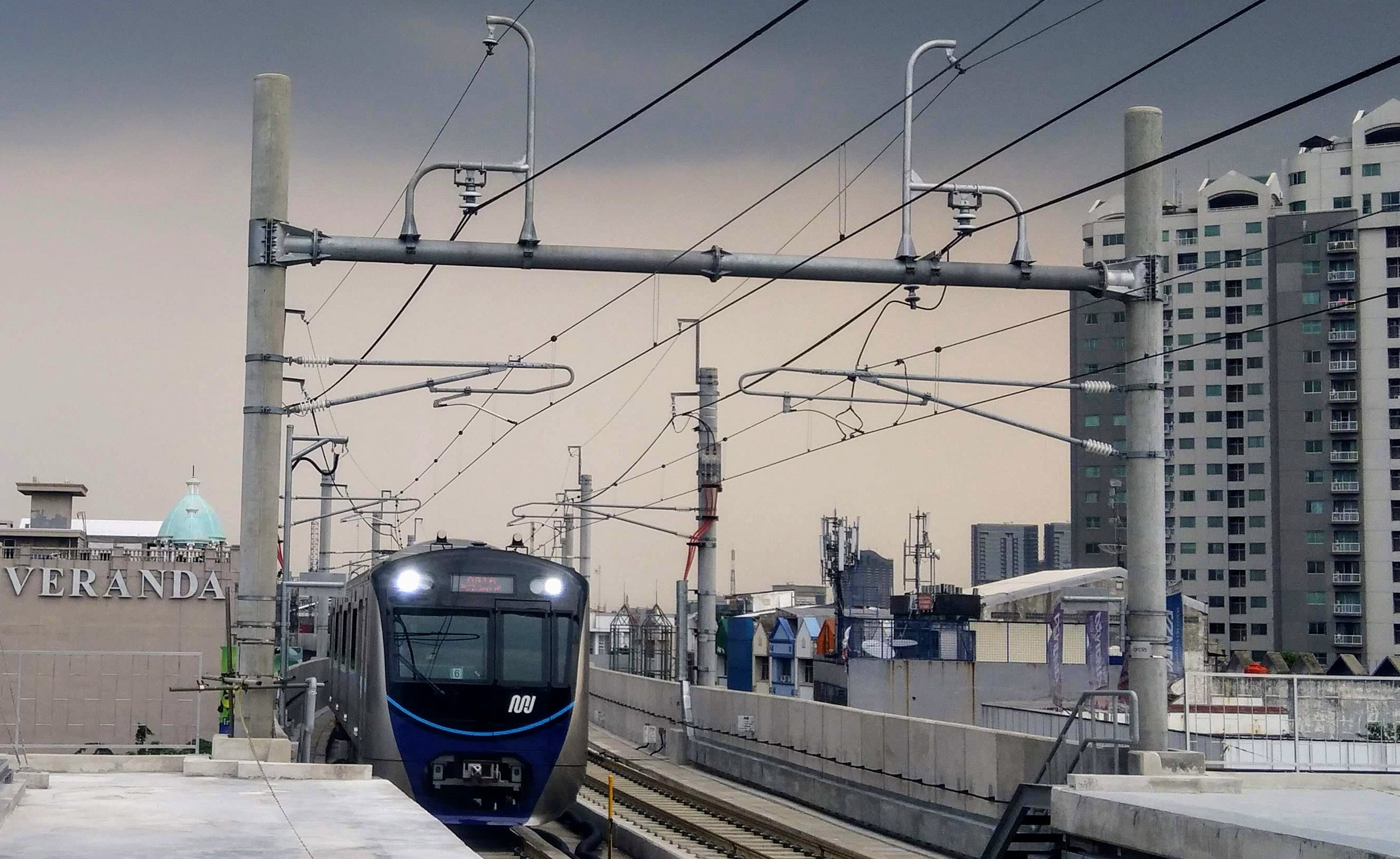
The MRTJ 1000 series Ratangga approaching Cipete Raya MRT Station

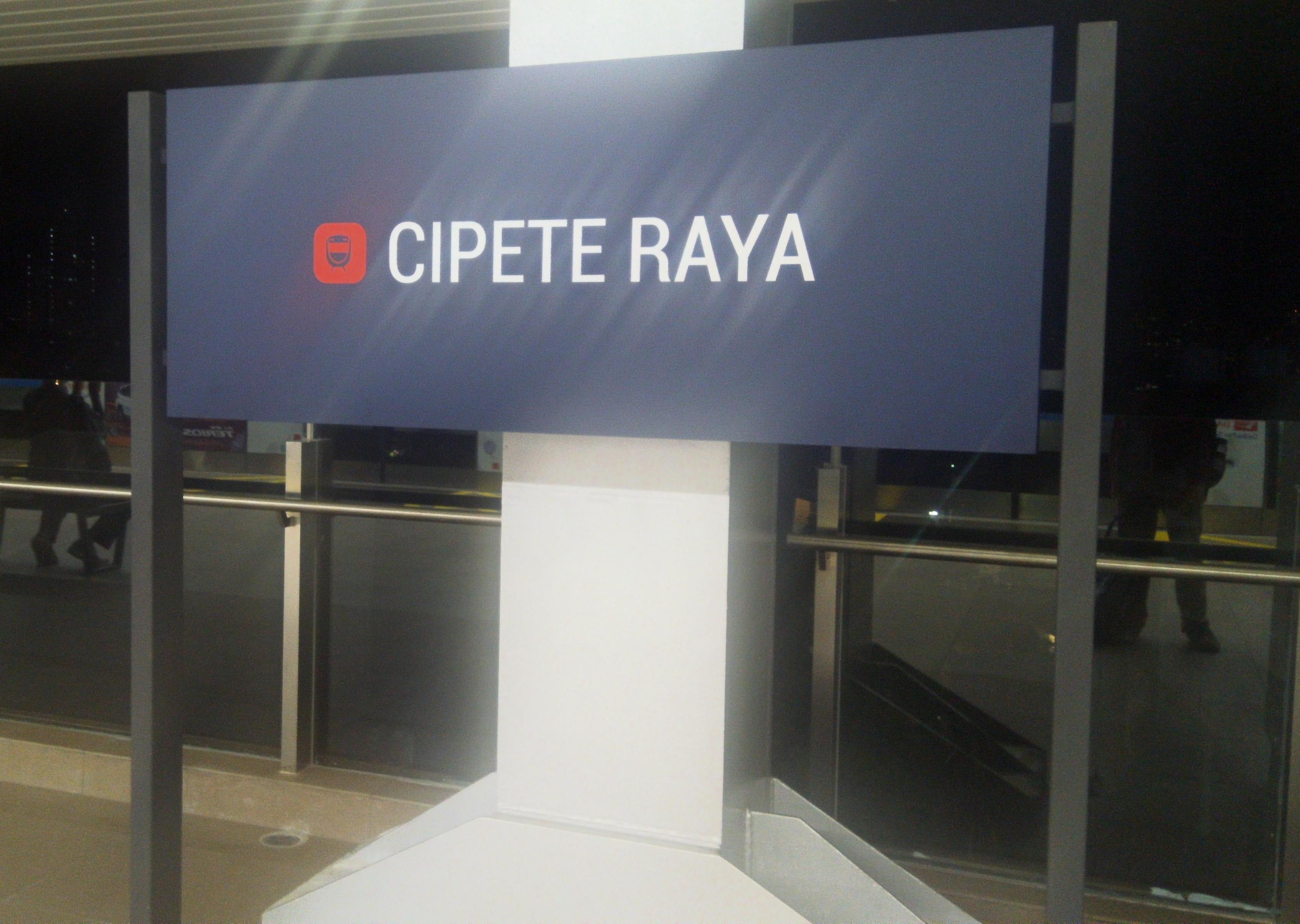
The signage of the station
