= Haji Nawi MRT station =

MRT station in Jakarta, Indonesia

M04 Haji Nawi
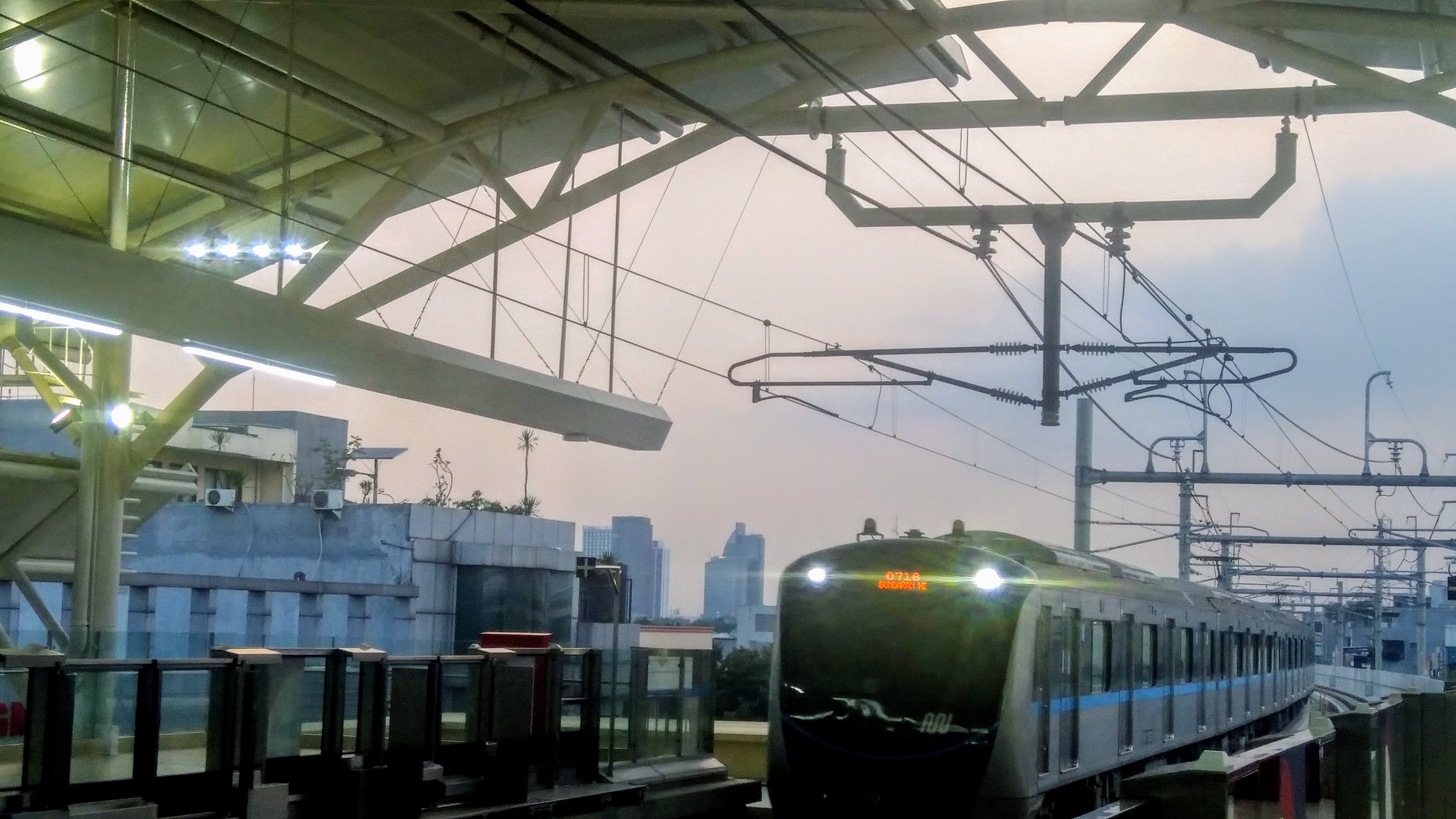
- MRTJ 1000 series Ratangga arriving at Haji Nawi Station

General information
- Location: Jalan RS Fatmawati 33, Gandaria Selatan, Cilandak; South Jakarta, Jakarta; Indonesia
- Coordinates: 6.2667982°S 106.7973162°E
- Owner: MRT Jakarta
- Operator: MRT Jakarta
- Line: North–South line
- Platforms: two side platforms
- Tracks: 2

Construction
- Structure type: Elevated
- Parking: Available
- Accessible: Available

Other information
- Station code: HJN

History
- Opened: 24 March 2019; 7 years ago

Services
Preceding station	Jakarta MRT	Following station
Cipete Raya Tuku towards Lebak Bulus	North-South Line	Blok A Visa towards Bundaran HI Bank Jakarta
Route map
Location
- Location within Jakarta

Haji Nawi Station is a rapid transit station on the North-South Line of the Jakarta MRT in Jakarta, Indonesia. The station is located on Jalan RS Fatmawati 58, Gandaria Selatan, Cilandak, South Jakarta, between Blok A Visa and Cipete Raya Tuku stations, and has the station code HJN.

The station is named after Jalan Haji Nawi Raya (Haji Nawi Raya Street) nearby, which in turn is named after Haji Nawi, a Betawi merchant who was the wealthiest person in Gandaria area and owned lands in the station's surrounding areas.

== History ==
Haji Nawi Station was officially opened, along with the rest of Phase 1 of the Jakarta MRT on 24 March 2019.

== Station layout ==
3rd floor Platform	Side platform, the doors are opened on the right side
3rd floor Platform	Platform 1	North South Line to Lebak Bulus Bank Syariah Indonesia (←)
3rd floor Platform	Platform 2	North South Line to Bundaran HI Bank Jakarta (→)
3rd floor Platform	Side platform, the doors are opened on the right side
2nd floor	Concourse	Ticket gates, ticket machines, counters and retail kiosks
1st floor	Street	Entrances and exits

== Nearby Locations ==
- ITC Fatmawati
- Graha Mas Fatmawati
- Plaza Mebel
- Pangudi Luhur Junior High School
- Kebayoran Baru General Hospital
