= Blok A Visa MRT station =

MRT station in Jakarta, Indonesia

M05 Blok A Visa
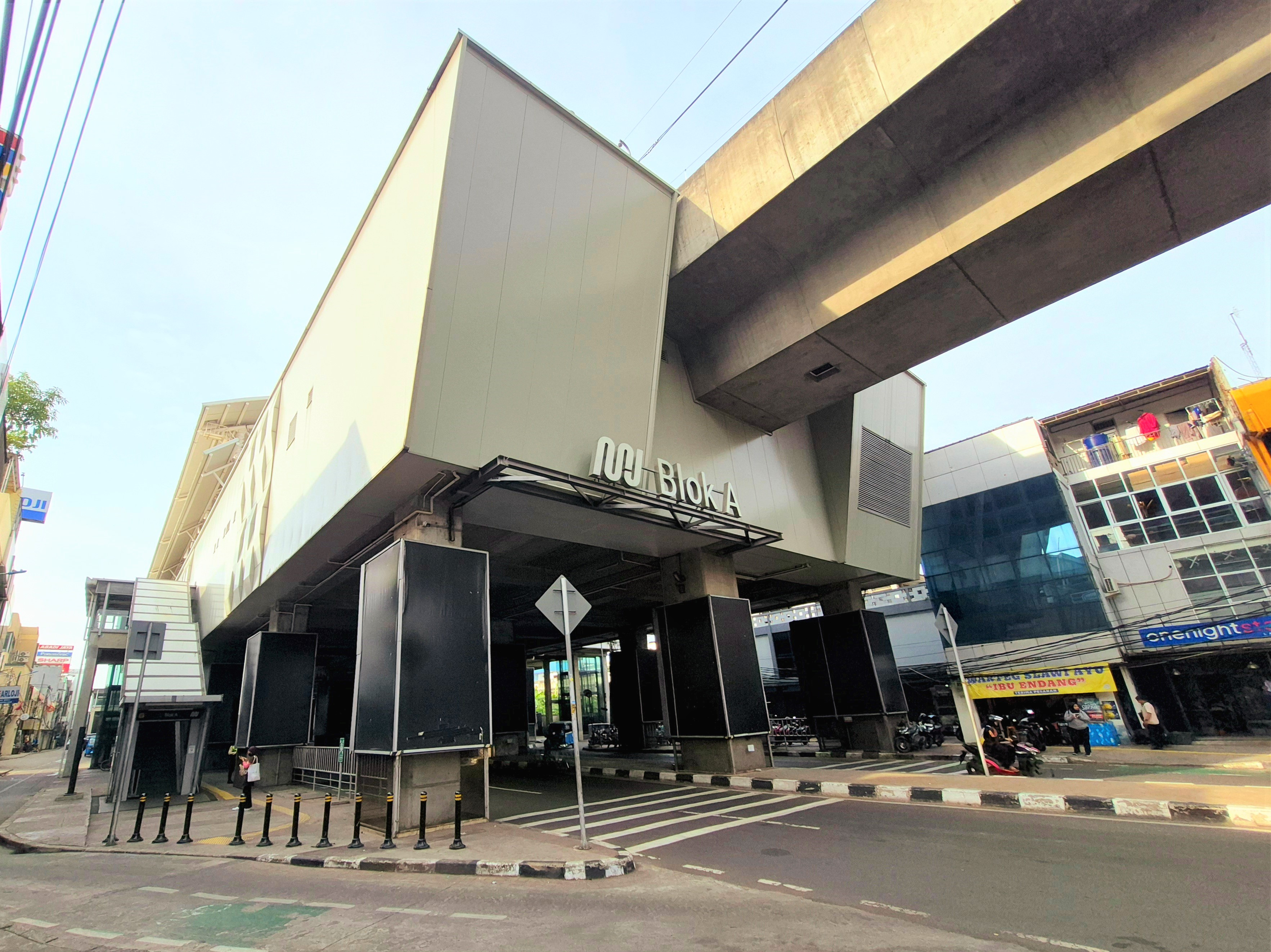
- The Blok A MRT Station exterior

General information
- Location: Jalan RS Fatmawati 58, Pulo, Kebayoran Baru; South Jakarta, Jakarta; Indonesia
- Coordinates: 6.2555837°S 106.797134°E
- Owner: MRT Jakarta
- Operator: MRT Jakarta
- Line: North–South line
- Platforms: two side platforms
- Tracks: 2

Construction
- Structure type: Elevated
- Parking: Available
- Accessible: Available

Other information
- Station code: BLA

History
- Opened: 24 March 2019; 7 years ago

Services
Preceding station	Jakarta MRT	Following station
Haji Nawi towards Lebak Bulus	North-South Line	Blok M BCA towards Bundaran HI Bank Jakarta
Route map
Location
- Location within Jakarta

Blok A Station (or Blok A Visa Station, with Visa Inc. granted for naming rights) is a rapid transit station on the North-South Line of the Jakarta MRT in Jakarta, Indonesia. The station is located on Jalan RS Fatmawati 58, Pulo, Kebayoran Baru, South Jakarta, between Blok M BCA and Haji Nawi stations, and has the station code BLA.

The station is close to Blok A of Kebayoran Baru, as well as Blok A market (Pasar Blok A).

== History ==
Blok A Station was officially opened, along with the rest of Phase 1 of the Jakarta MRT on 24 March 2019.

== Naming rights ==
On 11 August 2026, Visa Inc. officially hold the naming right for Blok A Station, hence Blok A Visa Station. This was done in light of the launch of contactless EMV credit card payment in the Jakarta MRT ticketing system.

== Station layout ==
3rd floor Platform	Side platform, the doors are opened on the right side
3rd floor Platform	Platform 1	North South Line to Lebak Bulus (←)
3rd floor Platform	Platform 2	North South Line to Bundaran HI (→)
3rd floor Platform	Side platform, the doors are opened on the right side
2nd floor	Concourse	Ticket gates, ticket machines, counters and retail kiosks
1st floor	Street	Entrances and exits

== Gallery ==
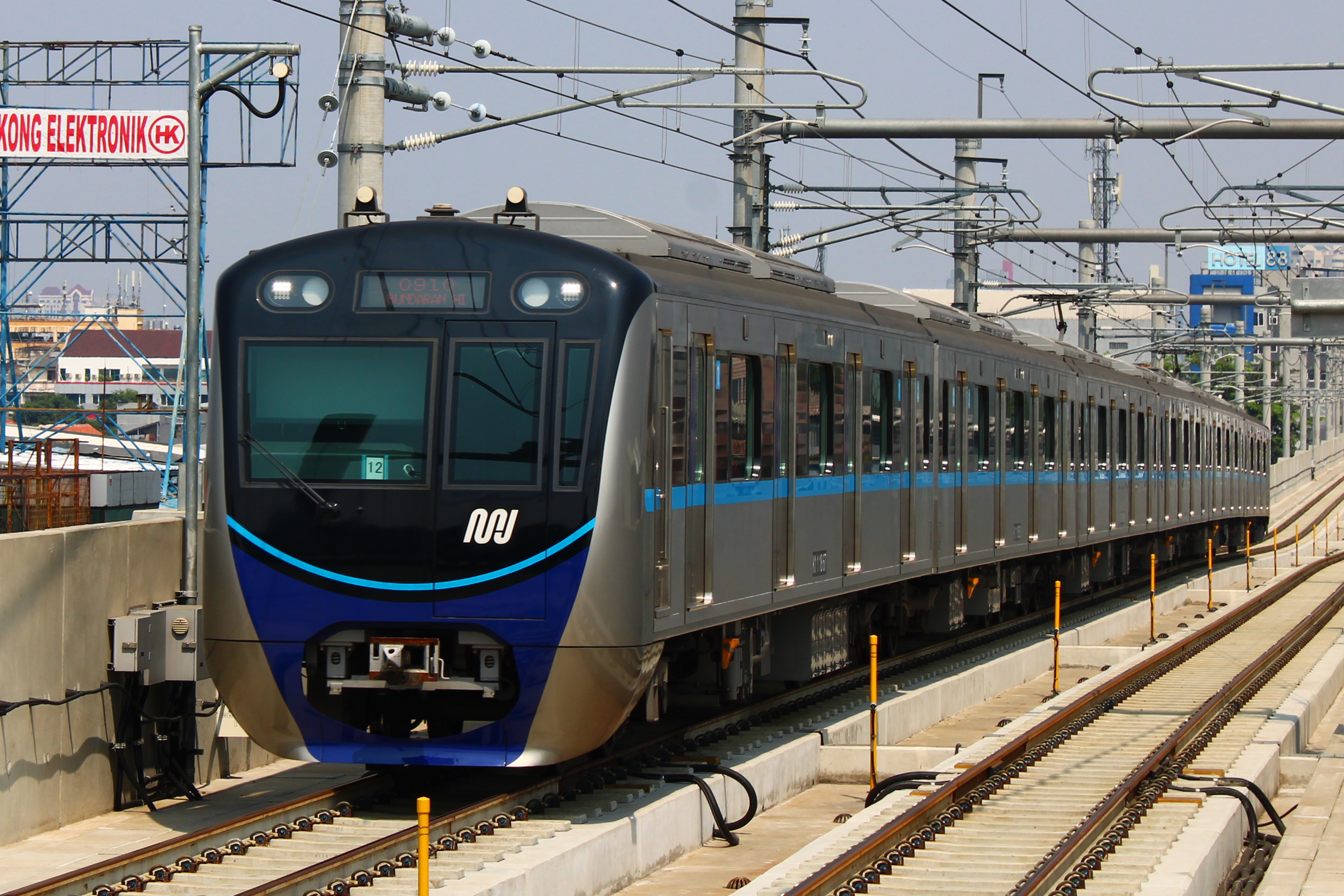
MRTJ 1000 series Ratangga approaching Blok A MRT Station

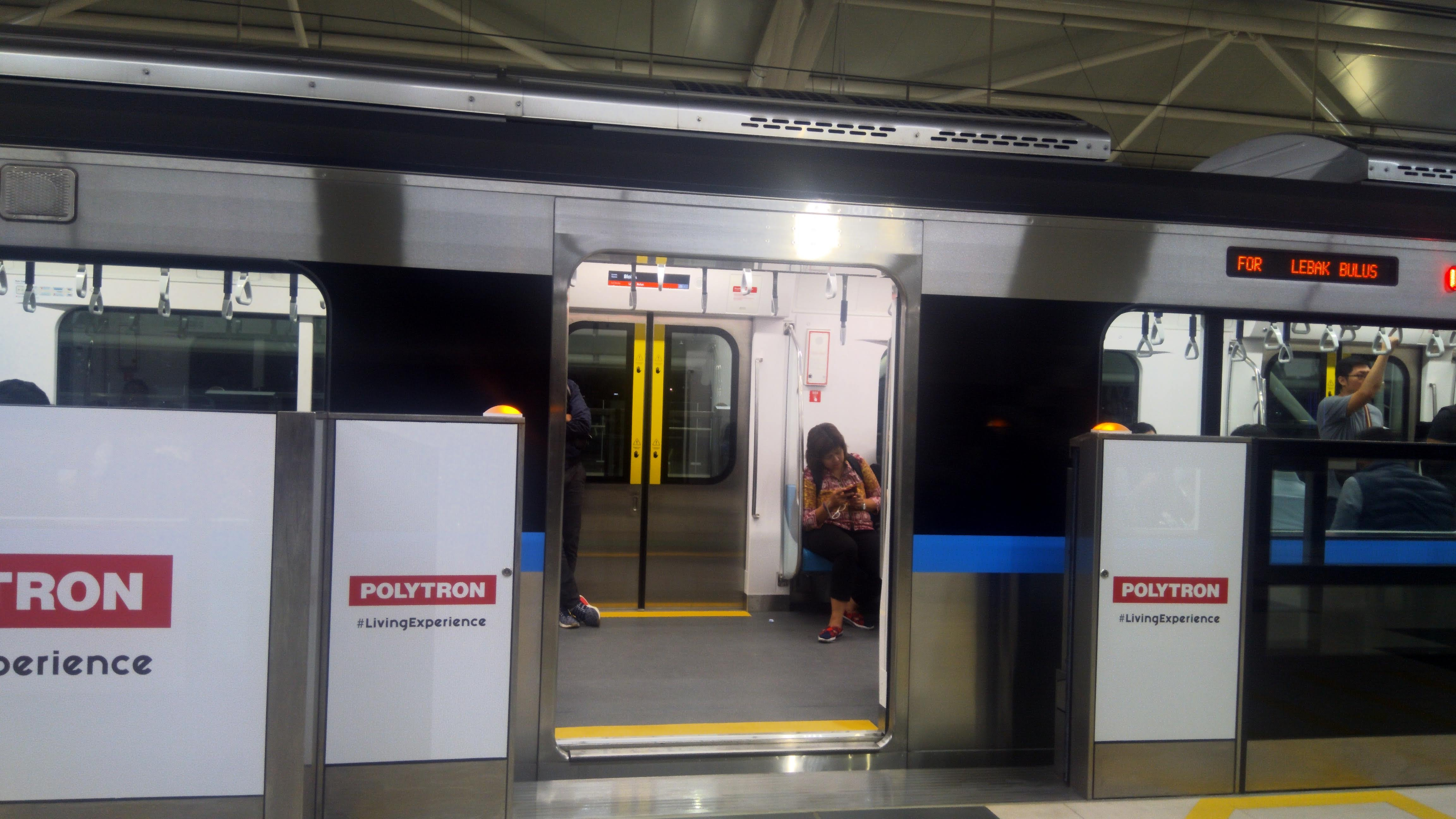
Ratangga in Blok A MRT Station

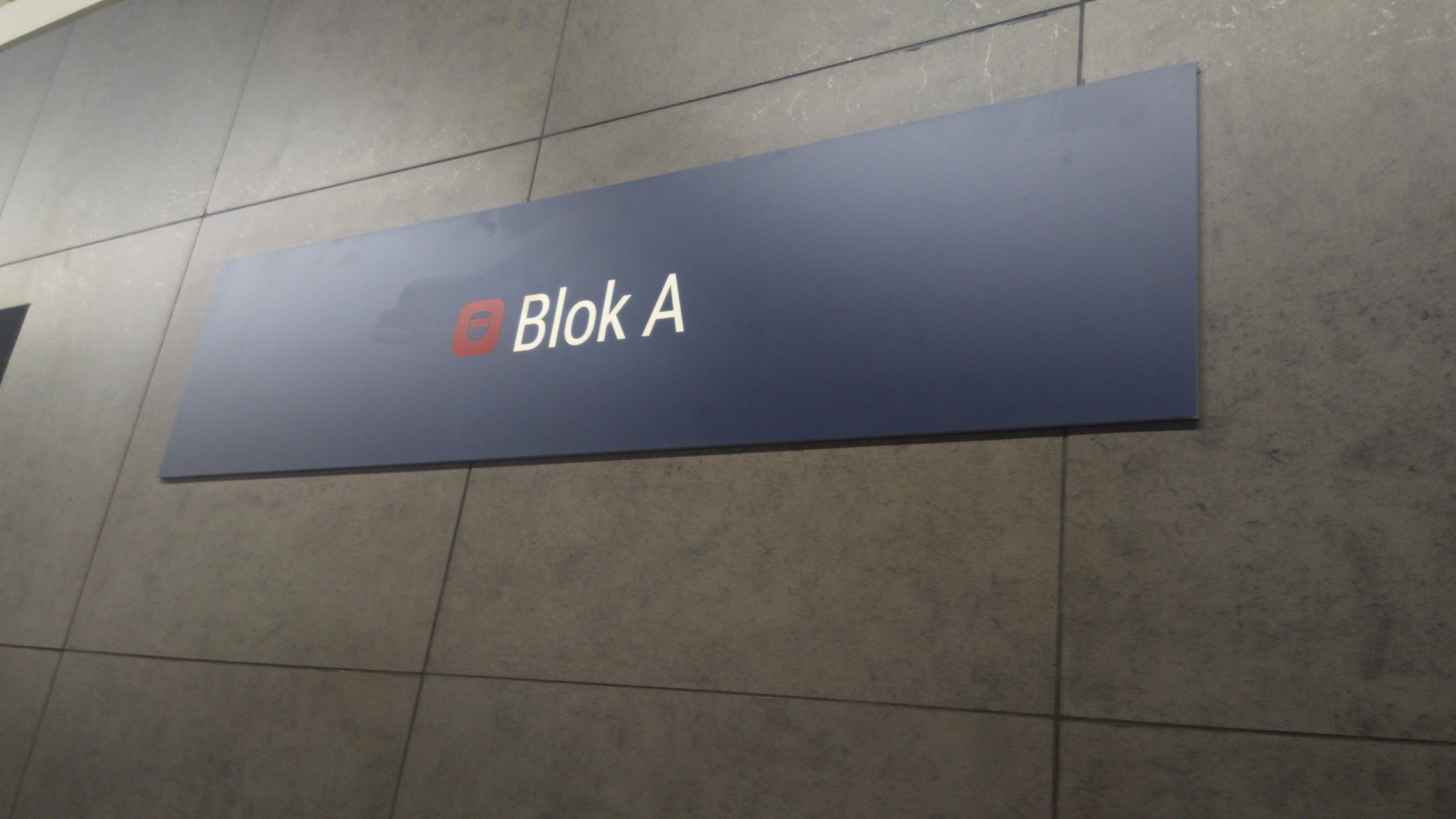
The signage of the station

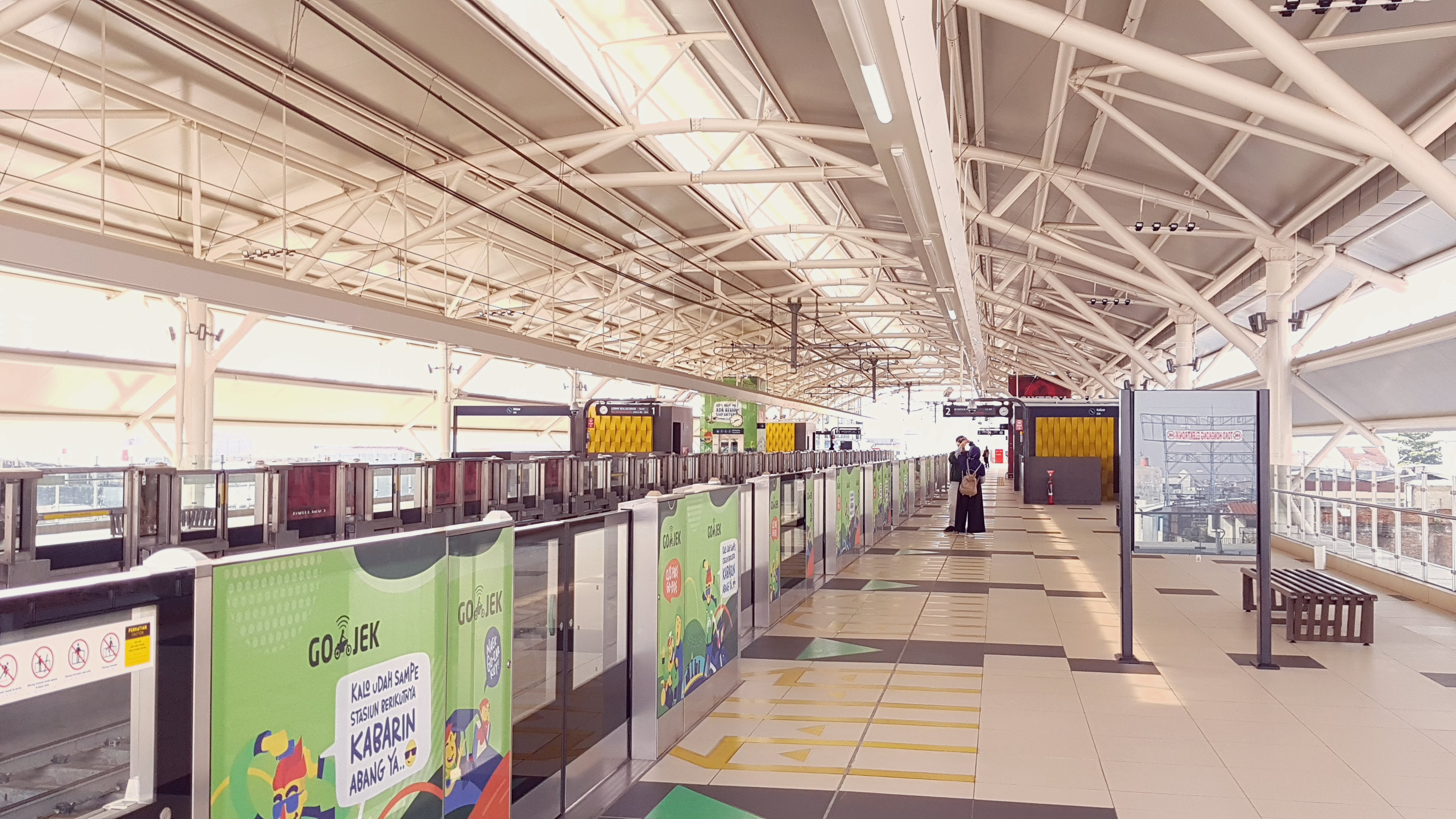
The platform of the station
