= Fatmawati Indomaret MRT station =

MRT station in Jakarta, Indonesia

M02 Fatmawati Indomaret
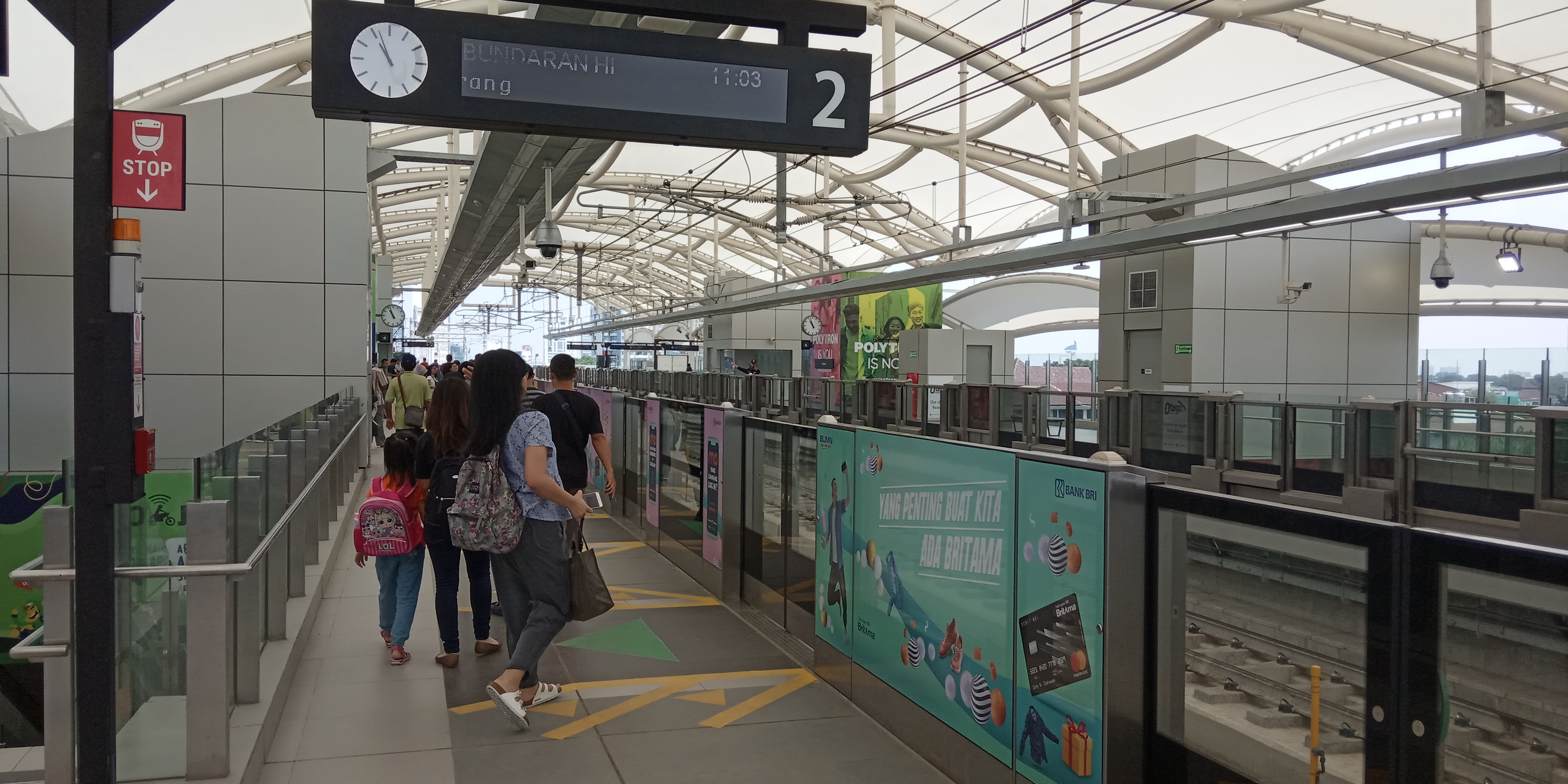
- The station platform

General information
- Location: Jl. RA Kartini, West Cilandak, Cilandak, South Jakarta; Jakarta; Indonesia
- Coordinates: 6.292429°S 106.792466°E
- Owner: MRT Jakarta
- Operator: MRT Jakarta
- Line: North–South line
- Platforms: 2 side platforms
- Tracks: 2

Construction
- Structure type: Elevated
- Parking: Available
- Accessible: Available

Other information
- Station code: FTM

History
- Opened: 24 March 2019; 7 years ago

Services
Preceding station	Jakarta MRT	Following station
Lebak Bulus Terminus	North-South Line	Cipete Raya Tuku towards Bundaran HI Bank Jakarta
Route map
Location
- Location within Jakarta

Fatmawati MRT Station (or Fatmawati Indomaret MRT Station, with Indomaret granted for naming rights) is a rapid transit station on the M1 North-South Line of the Jakarta MRT in Jakarta, Indonesia. Located in South Jakarta, it is the penultimate station on the North-South Line, located between Lebak Bulus Station (terminus) to the west and Cipete Raya Tuku (towards Bundaran HI) station to the northeast.

The station is named after Fatmawati Central Public Hospital (Indonesian: Rumah Sakit Umum Pusat Fatmawati or RSUP Fatmawati) nearby; which in turn is named after Fatmawati, the third wife of the first president of Indonesia Sukarno and the inaugural First Lady of Indonesia.

== Location ==
The penultimate station on the Jakarta MRT North-South Line (when heading south towards Lebak Bulus), Fatmawati station lies within the South Jakarta, Jakarta. It lies on Jl. R.A. Kartini in Cilandak.

== History ==
The station opened on 24 March 2019, along with the rest of Phase 1 of the Jakarta MRT. It is the planned terminus of the Outer Ring Line to Taman Mini Indonesia Indah as part of the fourth phase of the MRT development.

== Naming rights ==
On 19 April 2022, convenience store chain Indomaret secured the naming right of Fatmawati MRT station, hence Fatmawati Indomaret. It was first announced earlier on 1 March of the same year.

== Station layout ==
3rd floor Platform	Side platform, the doors are opened on the right side
3rd floor Platform	Platform 1	North South Line to Lebak Bulus (←)
3rd floor Platform	Platform 2	North South Line to Bundaran HI (→)
3rd floor Platform	Side platform, the doors are opened on the right side
2nd floor	Concourse	Ticket gates, ticket machines, counters and retail kiosks
1st floor	Street	Entrances and exits

== Gallery ==
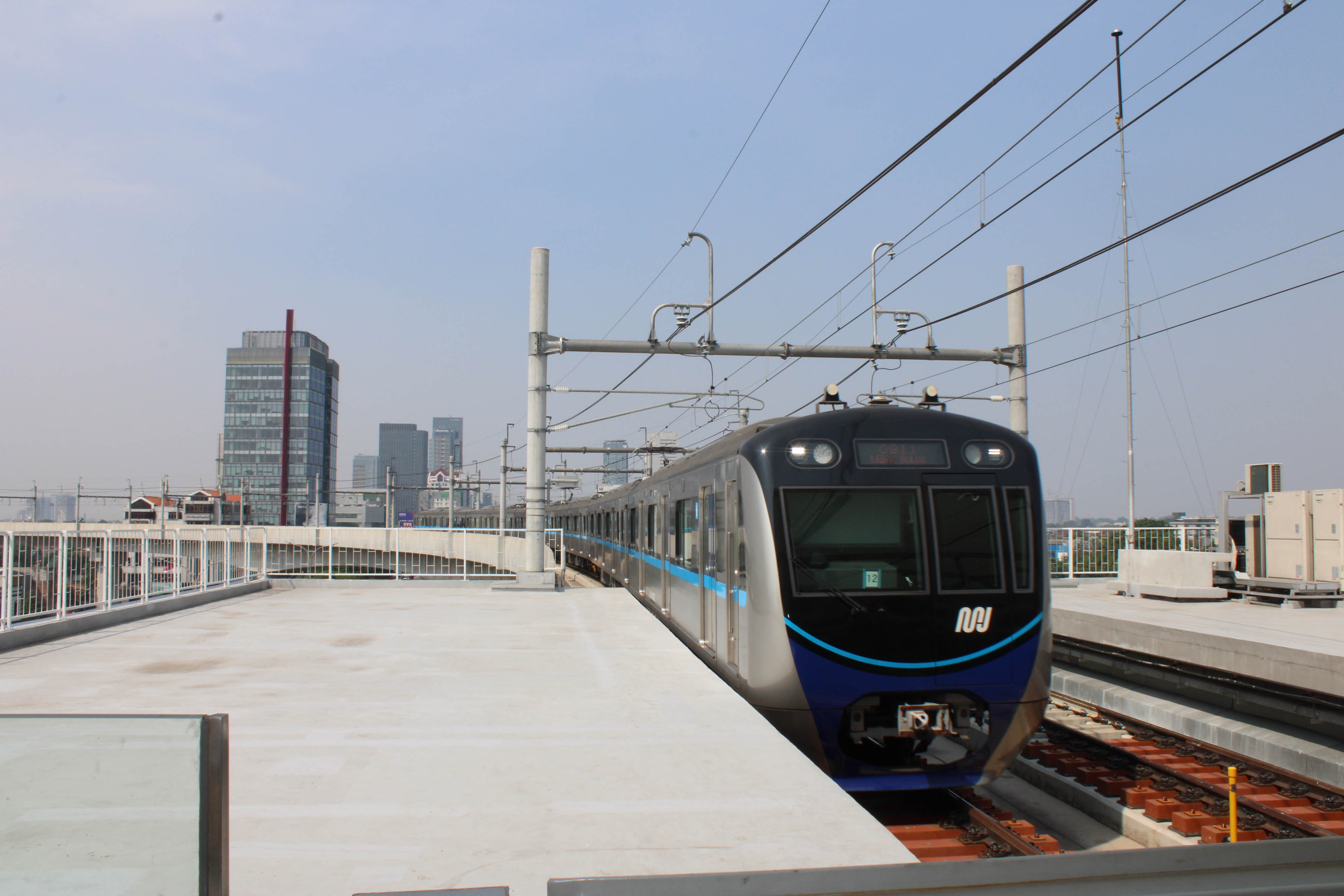
The Jakarta MRT TS12 rolling stock entering Fatmawati Indomaret Station.

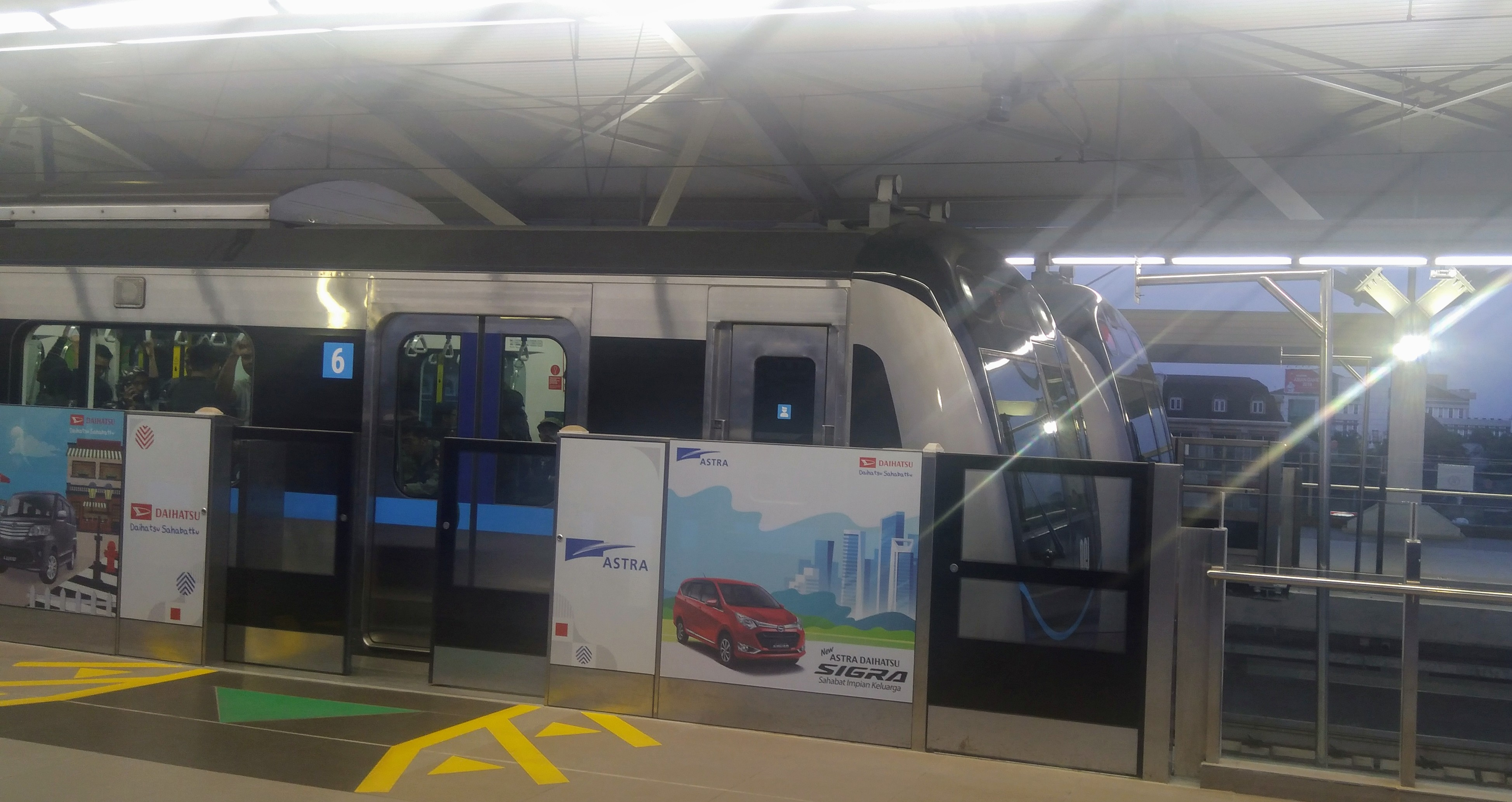
Two Ratangga trains at station platform

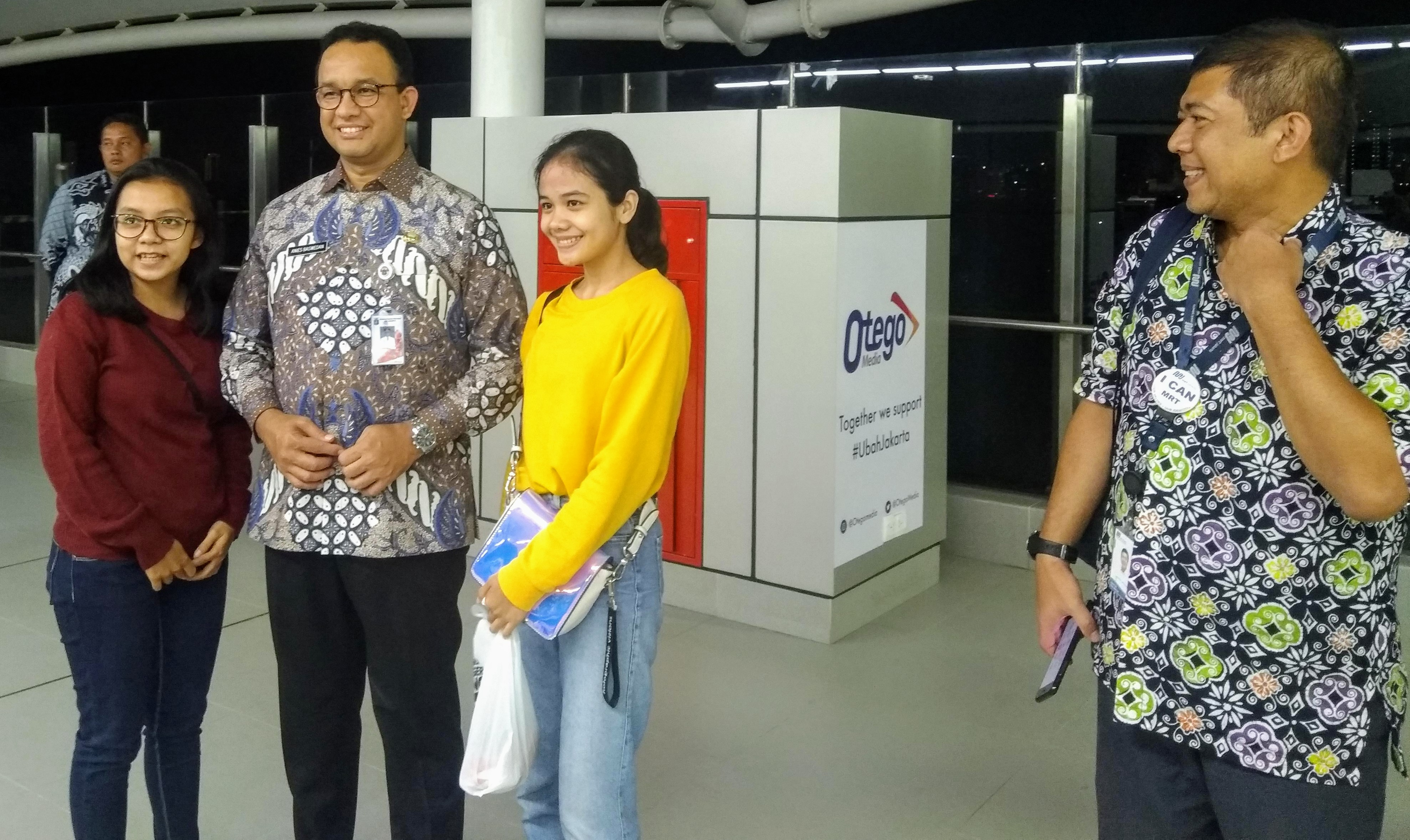
Then Jakarta Governor, Anies Baswedan (second from left) with the passengers at the Fatmawati Station

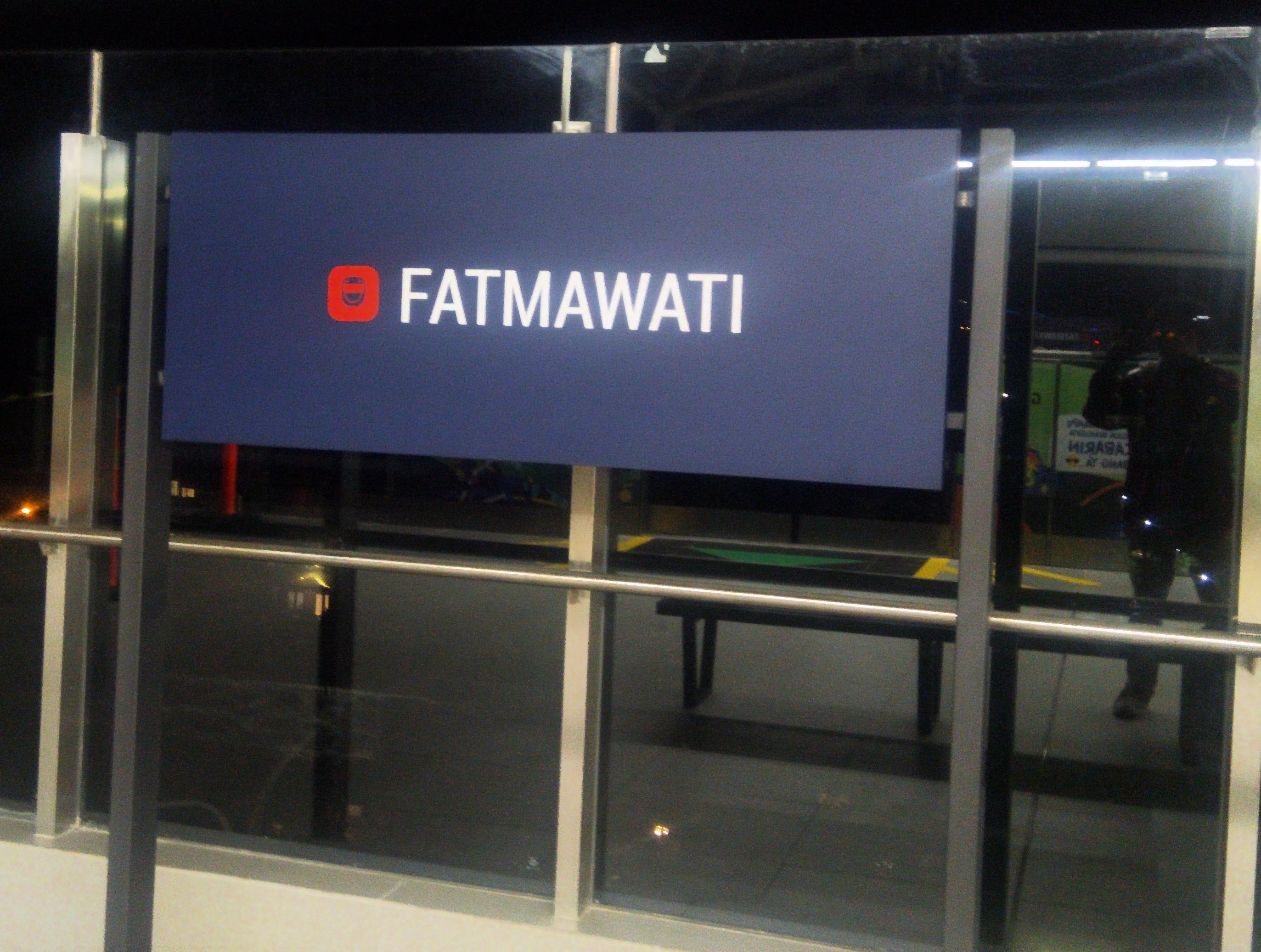
The station signage
