= Blok M BCA MRT station =

MRT station in Jakarta, Indonesia

M06 Blok M BCA
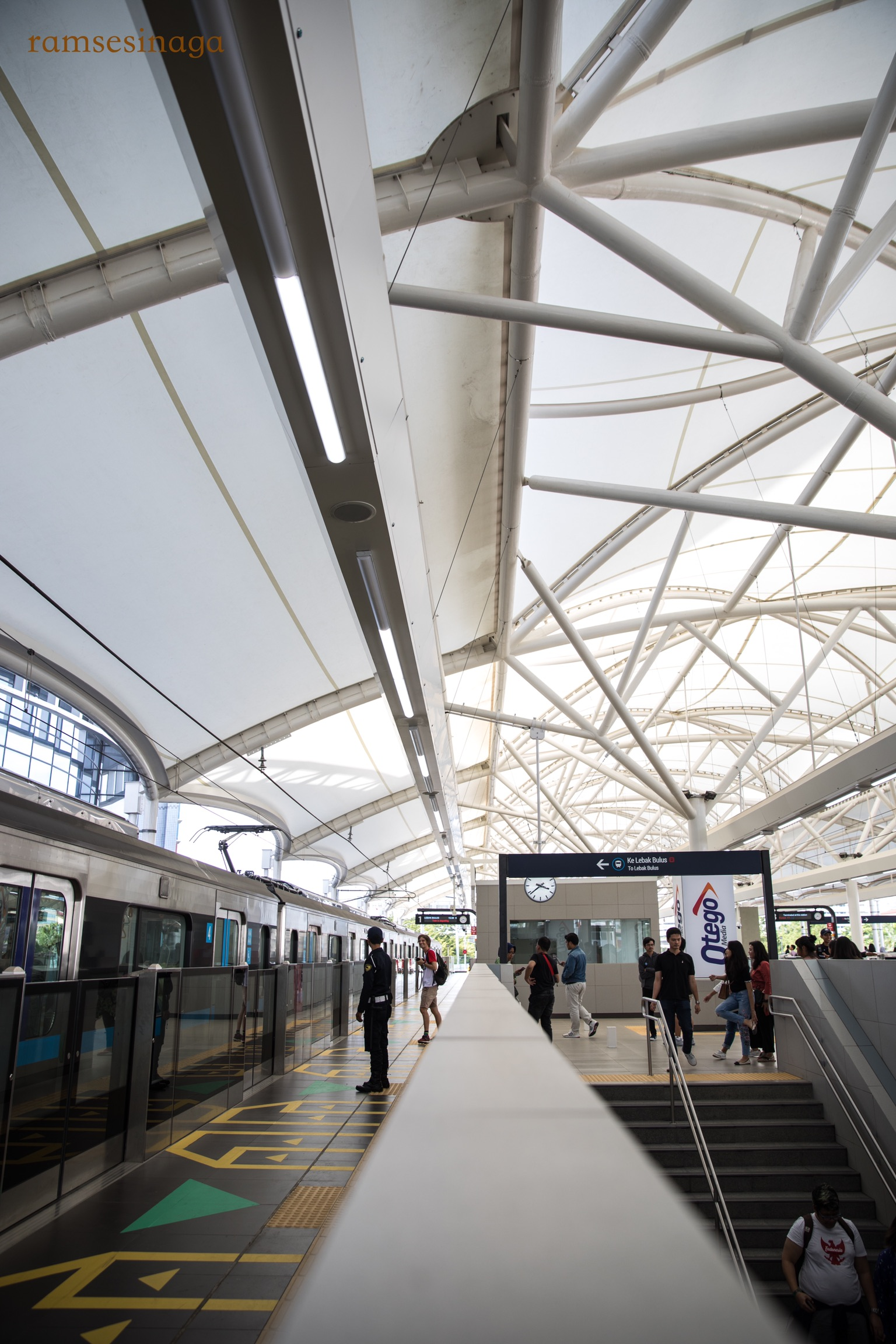
- The Blok M BCA Station platform

General information
- Location: Jalan Panglima Polim Raya 116 Melawai, Kebayoran Baru; South Jakarta, Jakarta; Indonesia
- Coordinates: 6.2445265°S 106.7982103°E
- Owner: MRT Jakarta
- Operator: MRT Jakarta
- Line: North–South line
- Platforms: Two island platforms
- Tracks: 3
- Connections: Blok M

Construction
- Structure type: Elevated
- Parking: Available
- Accessible: Available

Other information
- Station code: BLM

History
- Opened: 24 March 2019; 7 years ago

Services
Preceding station	Jakarta MRT	Following station
Blok A Visa towards Lebak Bulus	North-South Line	ASEAN Headquarters towards Bundaran HI Bank Jakarta
Route map
Location
- Location within Jakarta

Blok M MRT Station (or Blok M BCA MRT Station, with Bank Central Asia granted for naming rights) is a rapid transit station on the North-South Line of the Jakarta MRT in Jakarta, Indonesia. The station is located on Jalan Panglima Polim Raya, Melawai, Kebayoran Baru, South Jakarta, between ASEAN Headquarters and Blok A Visa stations. Unlike other stations on the MRT network, it has three tracks, with two island platforms.

Blok M BCA Station has a direct connection to adjacent Plaza Blok M, and will be integrated with the Blok M Bus Terminal. Due to its location at Blok M of Kebayoran Baru, the station is close to shopping centers such as Blok M Hub below the bus terminal, Blok M Square and Pasaraya Grande as well as Plaza Blok M itself.

== History ==
Blok M BCA Station was officially opened, along with the rest of Phase 1 of the Jakarta MRT on 24 March 2019. The station has prompted redevelopments of the surrounding area of Blok M, including the adjacent Martha Christina Tiahahu Park and Blok M Hub (formerly Mal Blok M).

== Station layout ==
3rd floor Platform	Platform 1	North–South Line to Lebak Bulus Bank Syariah Indonesia (←)
3rd floor Platform	island platform, Platform 1 doors are opened on the left side Platform 2 doors are opened on both sides
3rd floor Platform	Platform 2	North–South Line to both directions (↔)
3rd floor Platform	Island platform, platform 2 doors are opened on both platform 3 doors are opened on the left side
3rd floor Platform	Platform 3	North–South Line to Bundaran HI Bank Jakarta (→)
2nd floor	Concourse	Ticket gates, ticket machines, counters and retail kiosks
1st floor	Street	Entrances and exits

== Incidents ==
On May 30, 2024, a crane iron beam from construction project of the new building of the Attorney General's Office of Indonesia (Kejaksaan Agung RI) fell onto the tracks. The incident prompted the temporary suspension of services along the entire line to allow for the safe evacuation of the beam and to assess the condition of the tracks and signaling systems. Fortunately, no human casualties were reported.

== Gallery ==
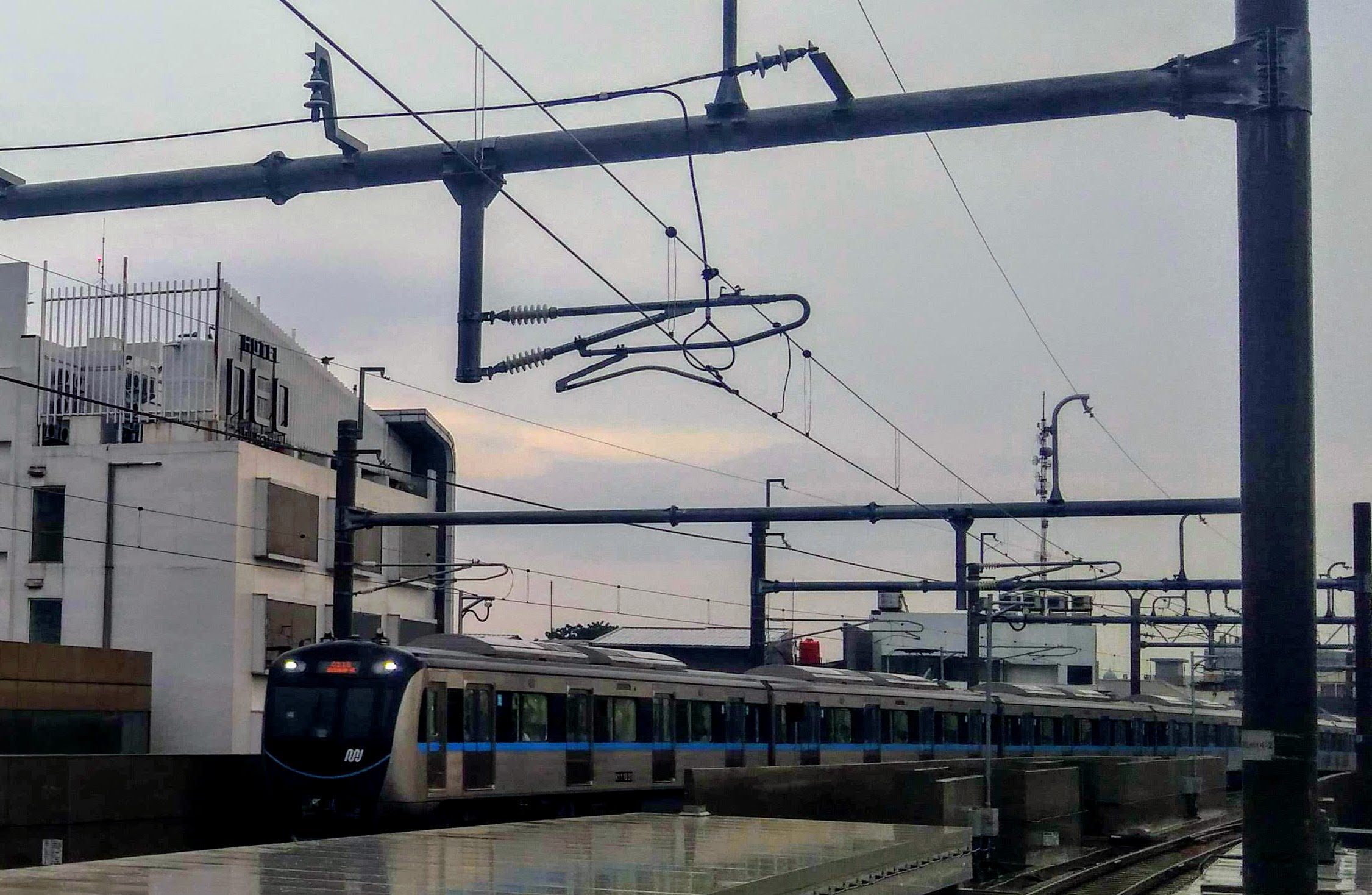
Ratangga arrival at the Blok M BCA station in the rain

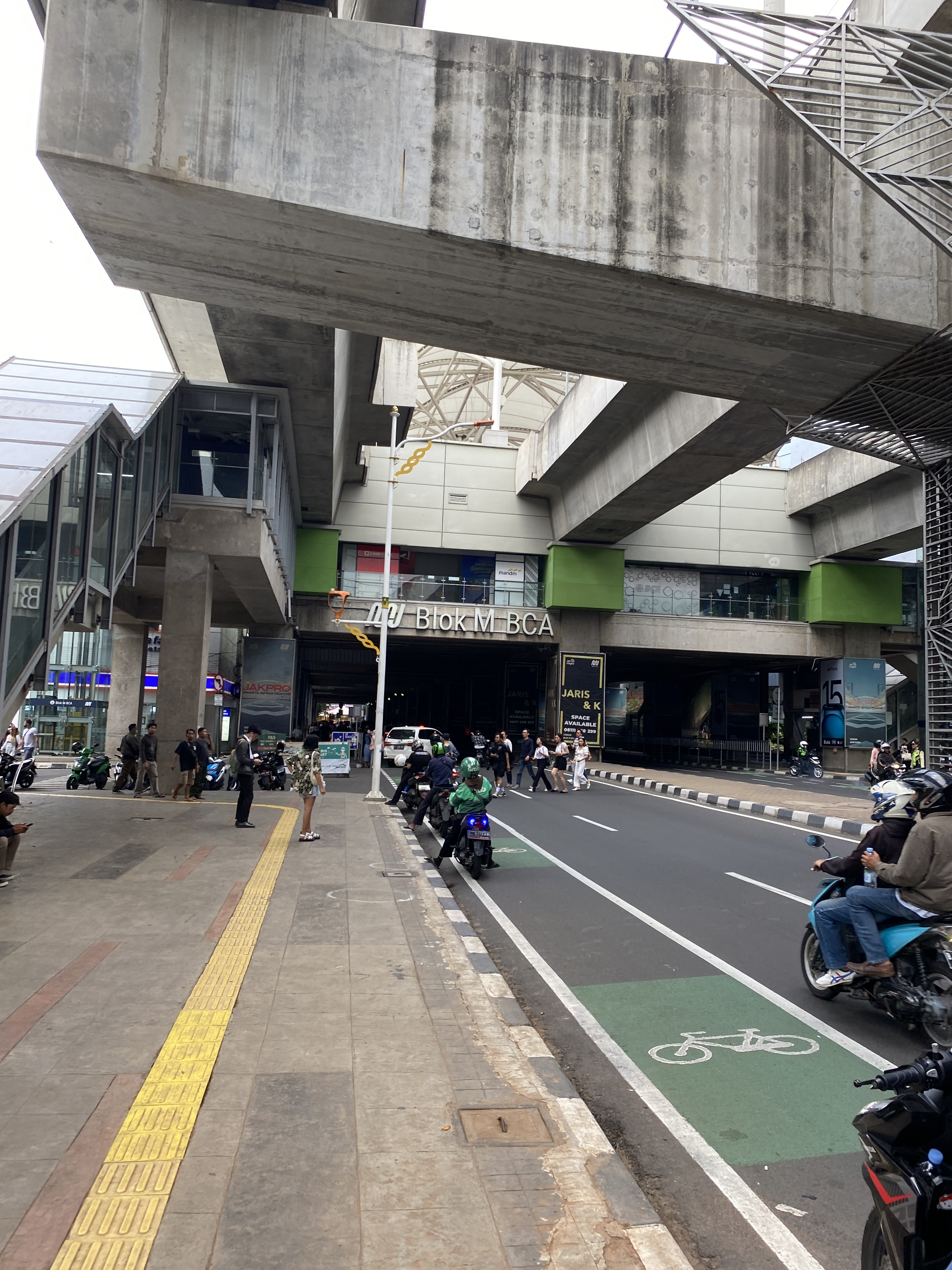
Blok M Station from Panglima Polim road

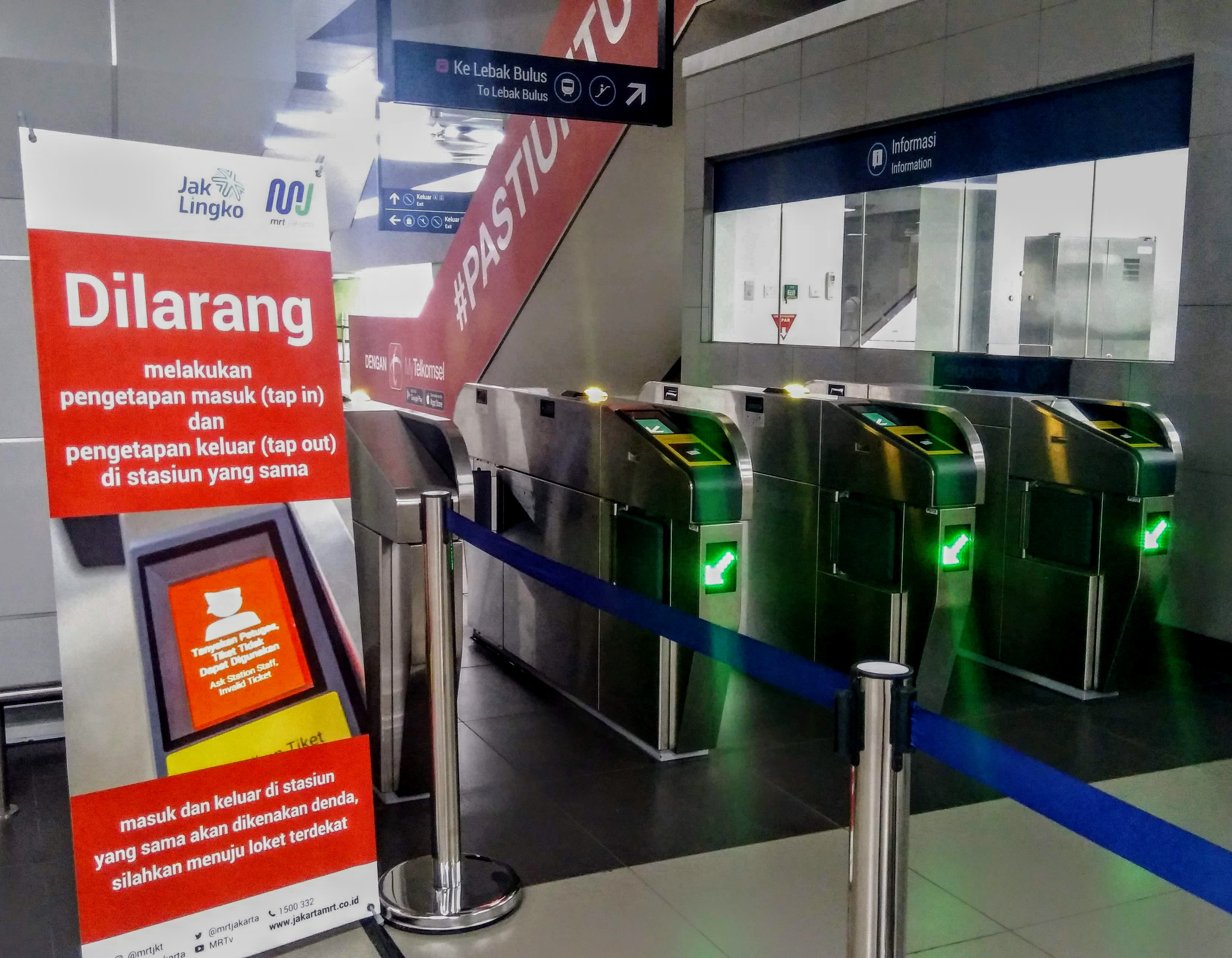
Ticket barriers at Blok M MRT Station

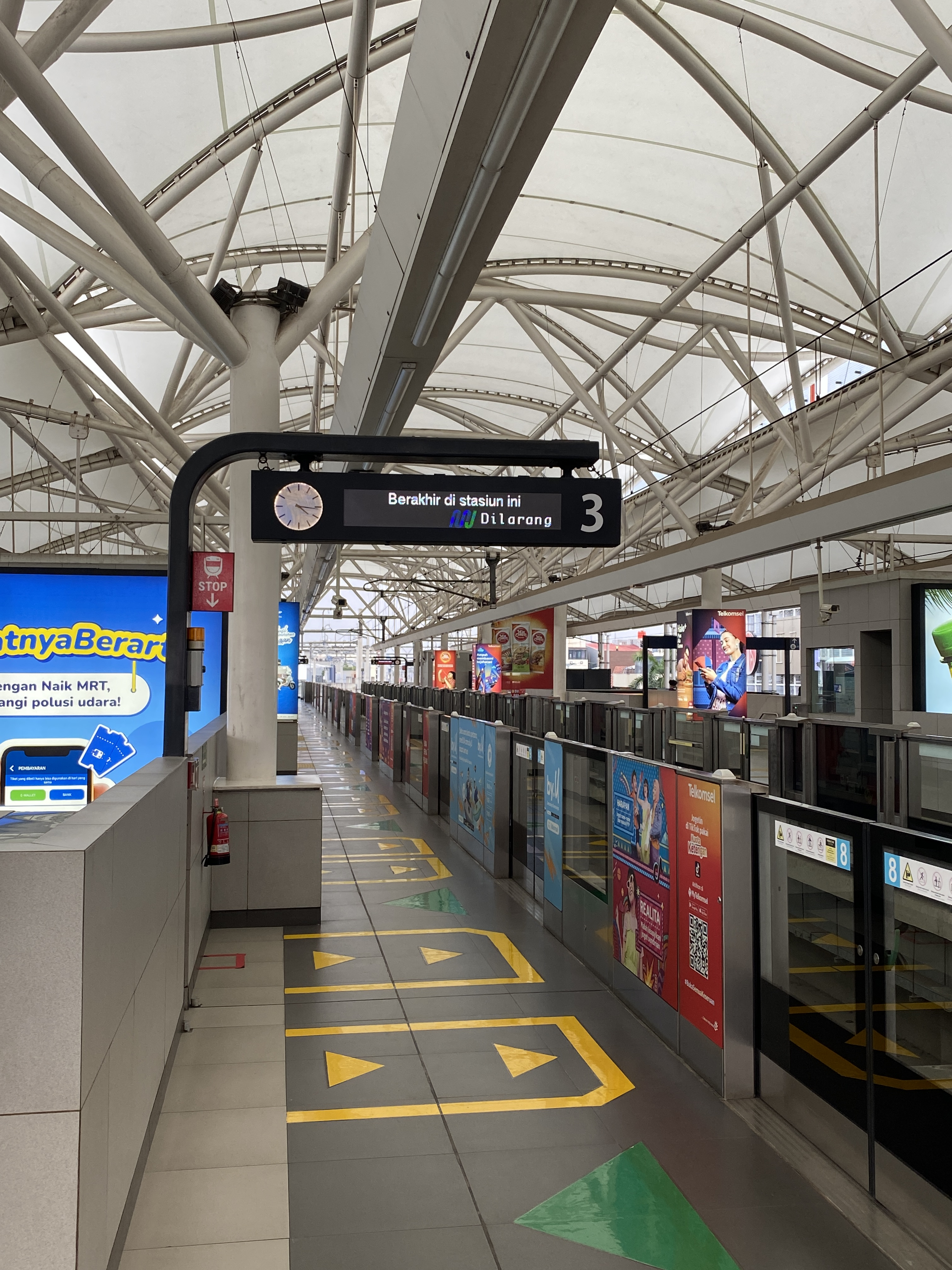
Platform screen doors and information sign at Blok M station

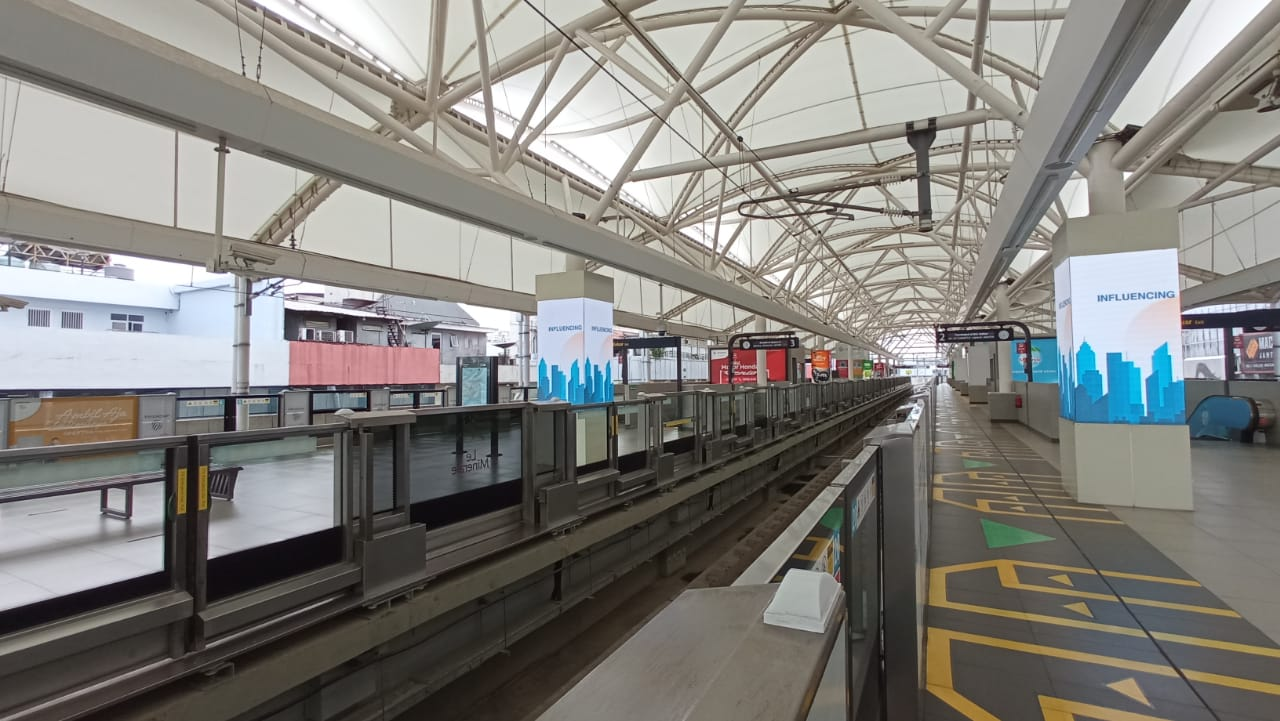
Blok M Station platform

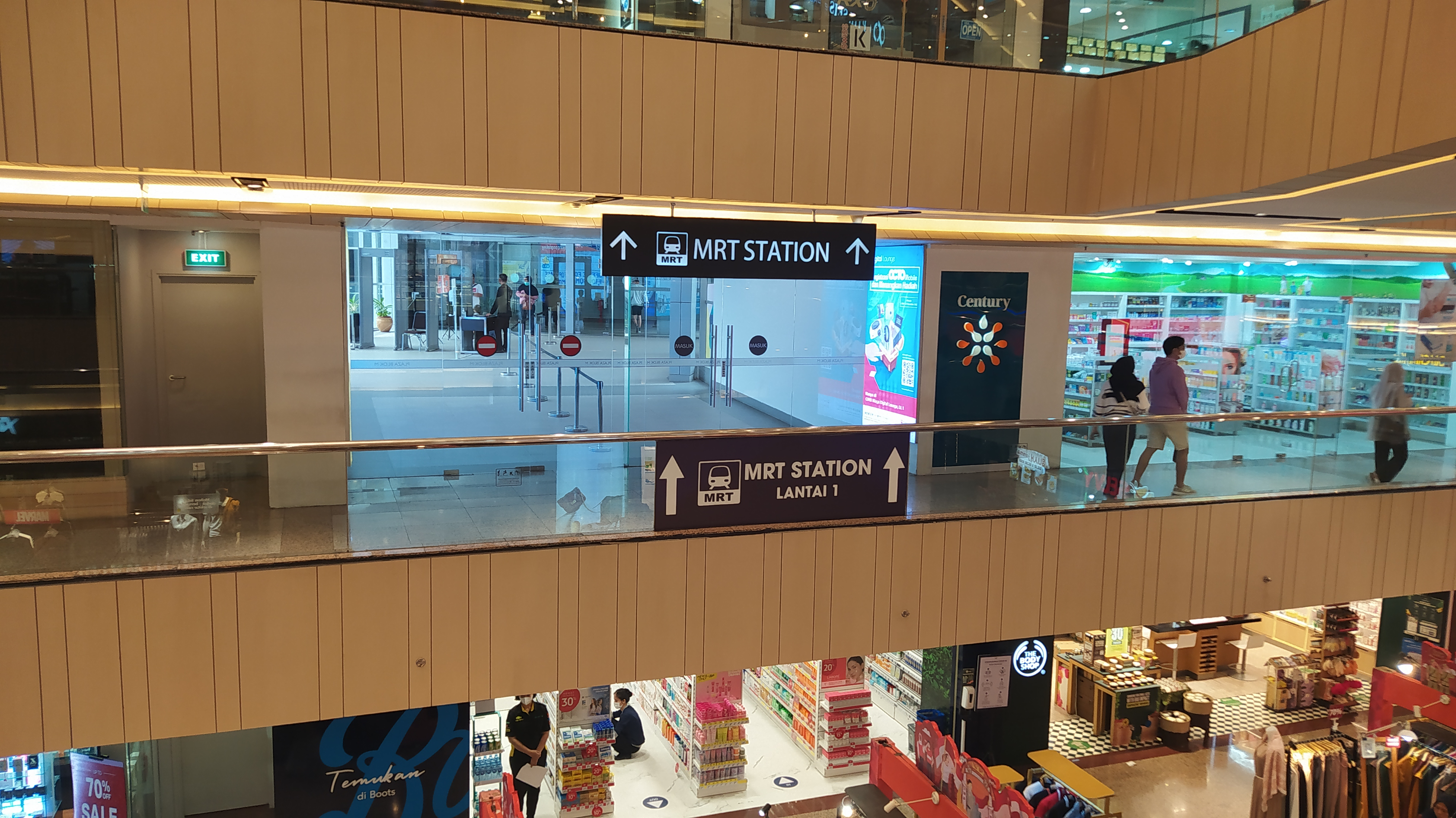
Integrated entrance of Blok M MRT Station from Plaza Blok M
