= MRTJ 1000 series =

Train of MRT Jakarta

MRT Jakarta Series K1 1 18 MRT Jakarta 1000 series Ratangga
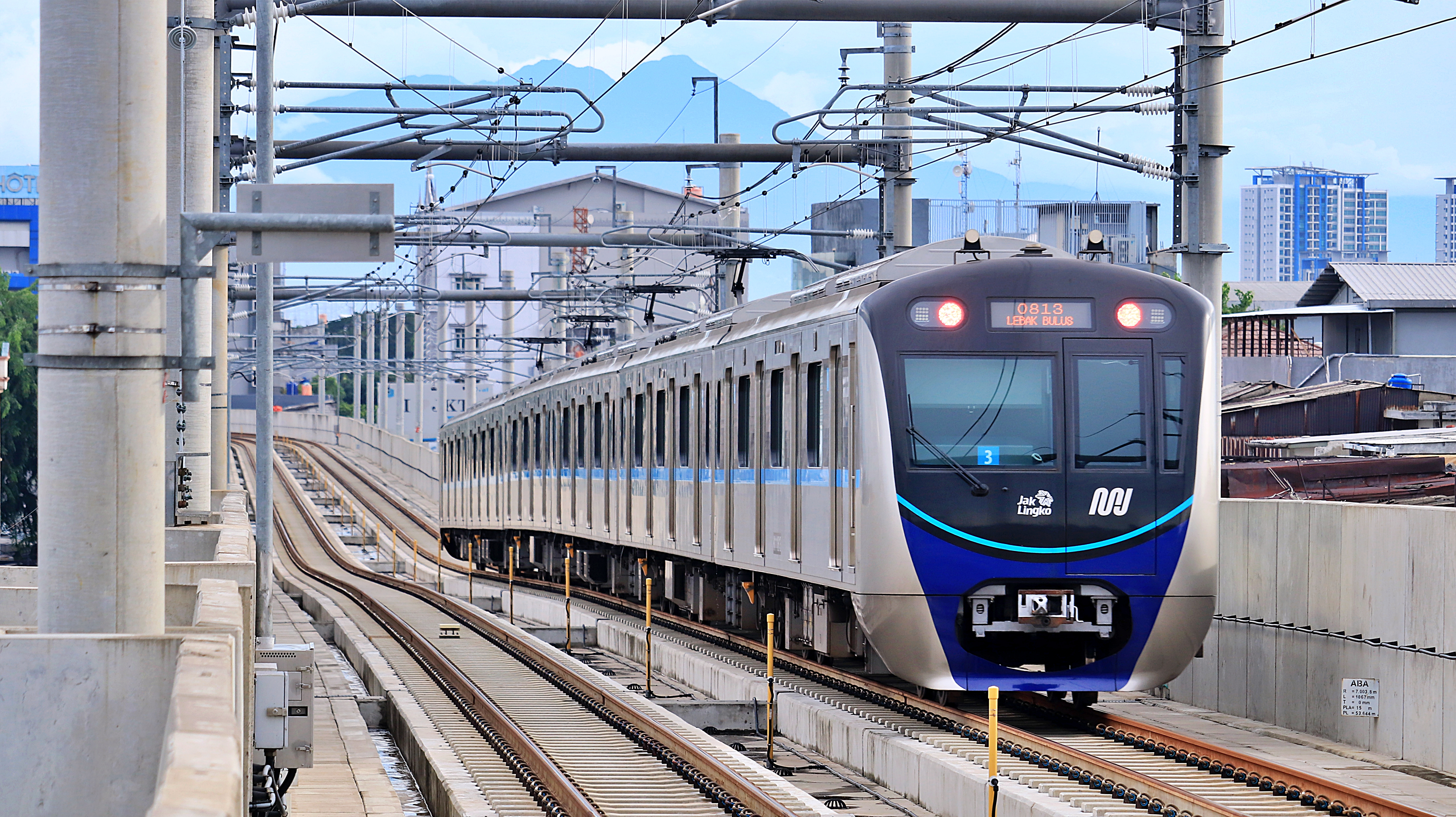
- Set 03 with Jak Lingko logo.

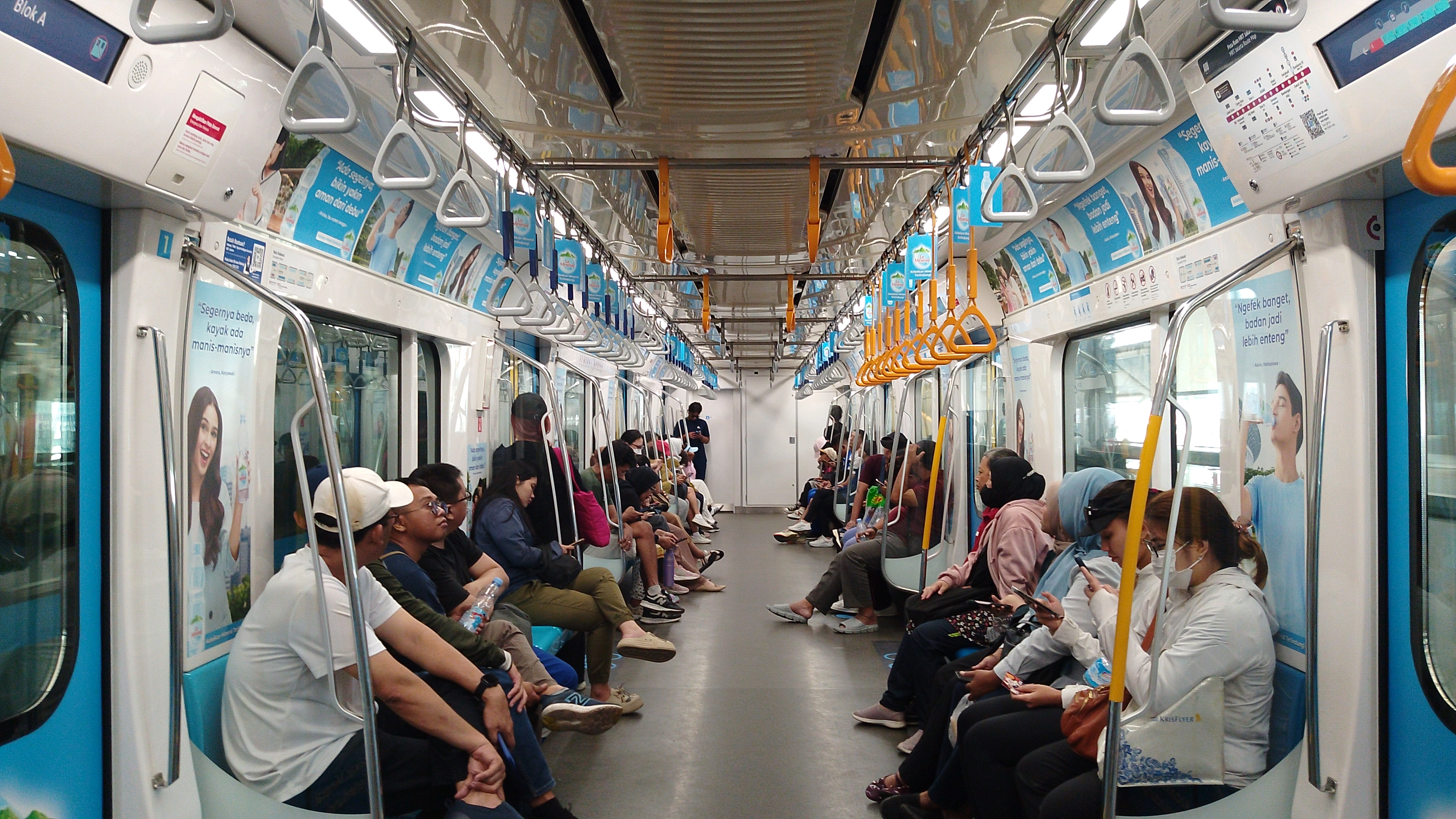
- In service: 2019–present
- Manufacturer: Nippon Sharyo
- Order no.: CP 108
- Built at: Toyokawa, Aichi, Japan
- Constructed: 2018
- Entered service: 24 March 2019
- Number built: 96 vehicles (16 sets)
- Number in service: 96 vehicles (16 sets)
- Formation: 6-car sets Tc1-M2'-M1'-M2-M1-Tc2
- Fleet numbers: 01–16
- Operator: MRT Jakarta
- Depot: Lebak Bulus
- Line served: North–South Line

Specifications
- Car body construction: Stainless steel
- Train length: 118.15 m (387 ft 8 in)
- Car length: 20,075 mm (65 ft 10.4 in) (Tc); 19.5 m (64 ft 0 in) (M)
- Width: 2.95 m (9 ft 8 in)
- Height: 3,655 mm (11 ft 11.9 in) (roof); 3,985 mm (13 ft 0.9 in) (top of AC); 3,995 mm (13 ft 1.3 in) (top of folded pantograph)
- Floor height: 1.15 m (3 ft 9 in)
- Doors: 4 per side
- Wheel diameter: 860–820 mm (34–32 in) (new–worn)
- Wheelbase: 2,100 mm (6 ft 11 in)
- Maximum speed: 100 km/h (62 mph)
- Traction system: Toyo Denki RG6036-A-M IGBT–VVVF
- Traction motors: 16 × Toyo Denki TDK6326-A 126 kW (169 hp) asynchronous 3-phase AC
- Power output: 2,016 kW (2,704 hp)
- Transmission: Twin-Disc (TD) Drive
- Gear ratio: 6.53 : 1 (98 / 15)
- Acceleration: 0.92 m/s^{2} (3.0 ft/s^{2})
- Deceleration: 0.8 m/s^{2} (2.6 ft/s^{2}) (service); 1 m/s^{2} (3.3 ft/s^{2}) (emergency)
- Electric systems: 1,500 V DC (nominal) from overhead catenary
- Current collection: Pantograph
- UIC classification: 2′2′+Bo′Bo′+Bo′Bo′+Bo′Bo′+Bo′Bo′+2′2′
- Bogies: ND-748 (powered), ND-748T (trailer)
- Safety systems: Nippon Signal SPARCS moving block CBTC with subsystems of ATC, ATO under GoA 2 (STO), ATP, ATS, CBI
- Coupling system: Shibata close-contact
- Seating: Longitudinal
- Track gauge: 1,067 mm (3 ft 6 in)

Notes/references
- Sourced from except where noted

The MRT Jakarta 1000 series, known legally as the Series K1 1 18, (Note: Classified legally as electric powered-executive-class trains by the Ministry of Transportation, hence the K1. This number is also used for the second-batch trains for the Soekarno–Hatta Airport Skytrain.) are the first generation rolling stocks to operate in the Jakarta MRT system. Also known as the Ratangga, the trains were manufactured by Japanese company Nippon Sharyo under Contract CP108. All sets were built in 2018 and started operation on 24 March 2019. They are classified as executive class trains, each set formed of six carriages.

== History ==
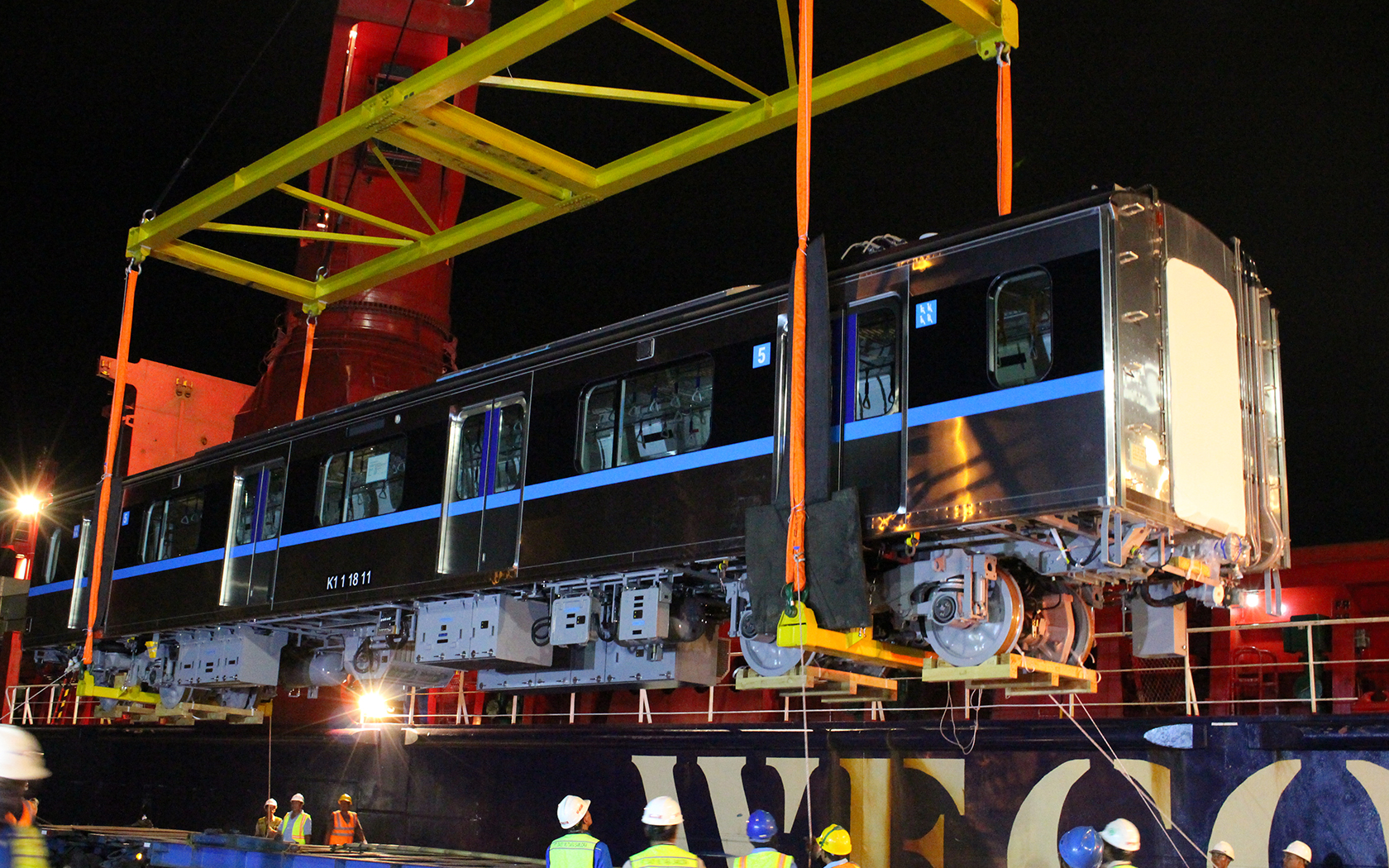
Train K1 1 18 11, the first unit of the Jakarta MRT EMU to be unloaded from the ship in April 2018

In February 2014, four participants who passed the pre-qualification process for the rolling stock tender were Hitachi-Mitsui Consortium, Sumitomo Corporation, Mitsubishi Corporation, and Kawasaki-Itochu joint venture.

The manufacture of the Ratangga trains is included in the Phase I North–South Line project as CP 108. The CP 108 contract for the procurement of the Jakarta MRT rolling stock was awarded to the Sumitomo Corporation - Nippon Sharyo consortium on 3 March 2015. The 16 trains, consisting of six trains each, were ordered at a cost of approximately ¥10.8 billion (Rp145 billion). The trains themselves were made at the Nippon Sharyo's Toyokawa, Aichi plant.

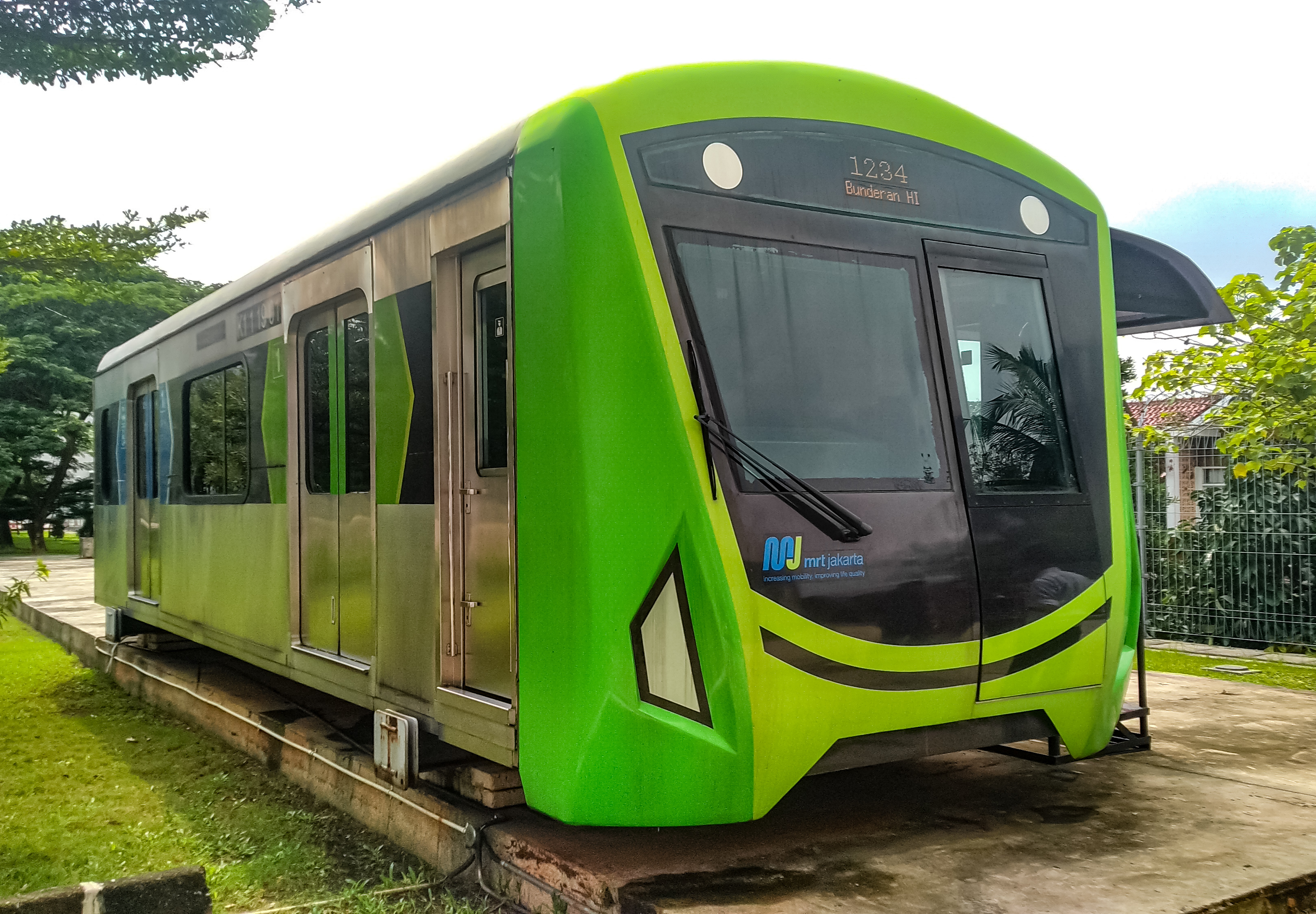
A mockup of the original design of the MRTJ 1000 series, which was said to look like a cricket

In the middle of the production period, the train design was changed in 2017. This design change was prioritised on the driver's cabin which was considered by the then-acting governor of Jakarta, Soni Sumarsono, to 'look like a cricket' [sic]. The design change changed the contract agreement and was estimated to increase production costs by as much as Rp64 billion.

Ratangga deliveries were made in 2018. The first shipment of two trains arrived at Tanjung Priok Port on 4 April 2018. The name Ratangga as the designation of the train was announced on 10 December 2018.

The first train test was conducted on 9 August 2018. This test was conducted to test the signalling and train systems. Meanwhile, the first trial of the series with passengers was carried out on 12 March 2019 which was also a limited public trial. The Ratangga series was first fully operated in conjunction with the inauguration of the Jakarta MRT North-South Line on 24 March 2019.

== Naming ==
This series of electric railway trains is called Ratangga. The name Ratangga was chosen after deliberations between PT MRT Jakarta and the Ministry of Education and Culture's Language Agency. The name Ratangga is taken from the Arjuna Wiwaha and Sutasoma books by Mpu Tantular. Ratangga itself means wheeled vehicle, chariot, or war chariot in Old Javanese. The choice of the chariot naming, synonymous with a strong and dynamic horse-drawn carriage, is expected to symbolize a prayer for the smooth operation of the Jakarta MRT. The naming was announced on 10 December 2018, by the then-Governor of Jakarta, Anies Baswedan, who gave the first batch of MRT Jakarta trainsets their current name.

== Specifications ==
Each car measures approximately 20 m (65 ft 7 in) in length, 2.9 m (9 ft 6 in) in width and 3.9 m (12 ft 10 in) in height, similar dimensions to many Japanese commuter trains. Each car has four doors on each of its two sides, except for the first and sixth cars which have an additional driver's cabin door on each side. These trains use the CBTC signaling system and are equipped with automatic train operation (ATO) under GoA 2. The automatic train control is centralised at Lebak Bulus Depot. However, there is still a driver on the train to control the doors and operate the train during emergencies. Like the KRL Commuterline, the MRT trains are also powered via overhead catenary.

=== Formation ===
Each Ratangga consists of six cars. Each train has two driver cabins located at the front and rear of the train. Both driving cars are unpowered trailer cars (type Tc) while each intermediate car is equipped with drive motors (type M). All Ratangga trains are classified as executive trains and have serial numbers K 1 18 01 to K 1 18 96. The complete formation of a Ratangga train consists of Tc1-M2'-M1'-M2-M1-Tc2. The sets offer a women-only carriage during morning peak hours from 7AM to 9AM and in the afternoon from 5PM to 7PM.

MRTJ 1000 trainset
	Series arrangement					
Type	Tc2	M1	M2	M1'	M2'	Tc1
Passenger capacity	307	332	336	336	332	307
Number of seats	48	54	51	51	54	48

== Interior ==
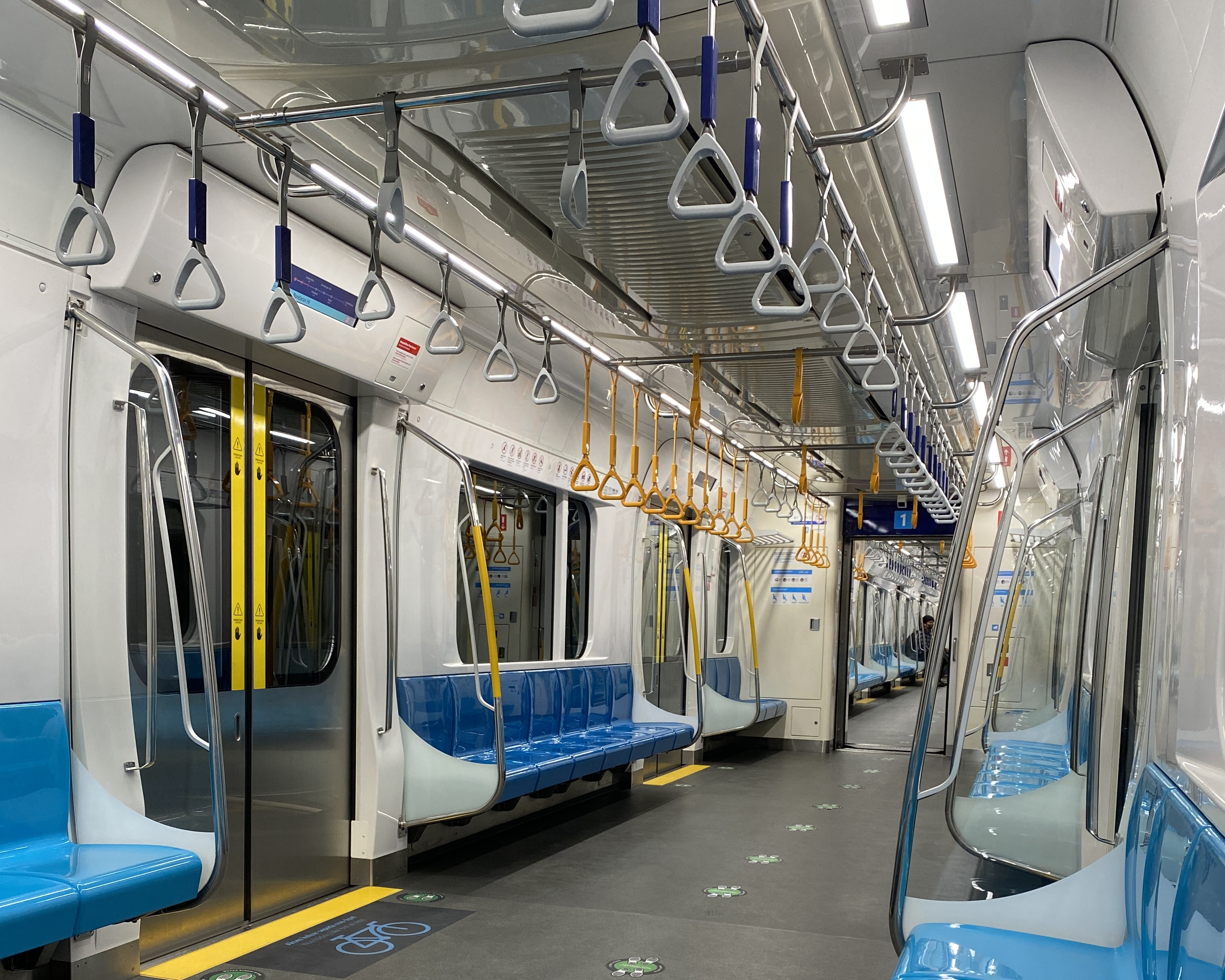
Interior of the set

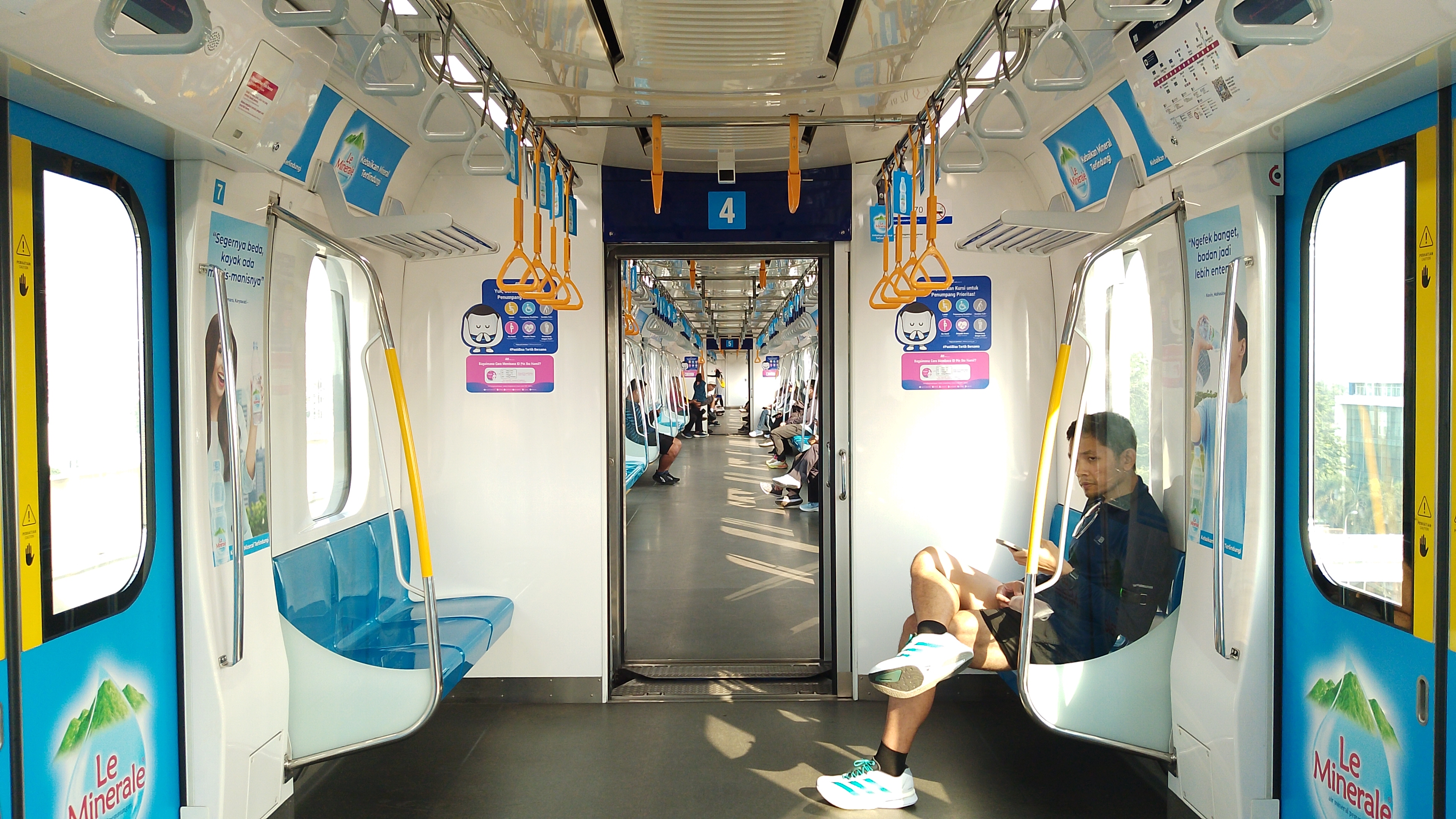
Priority seat

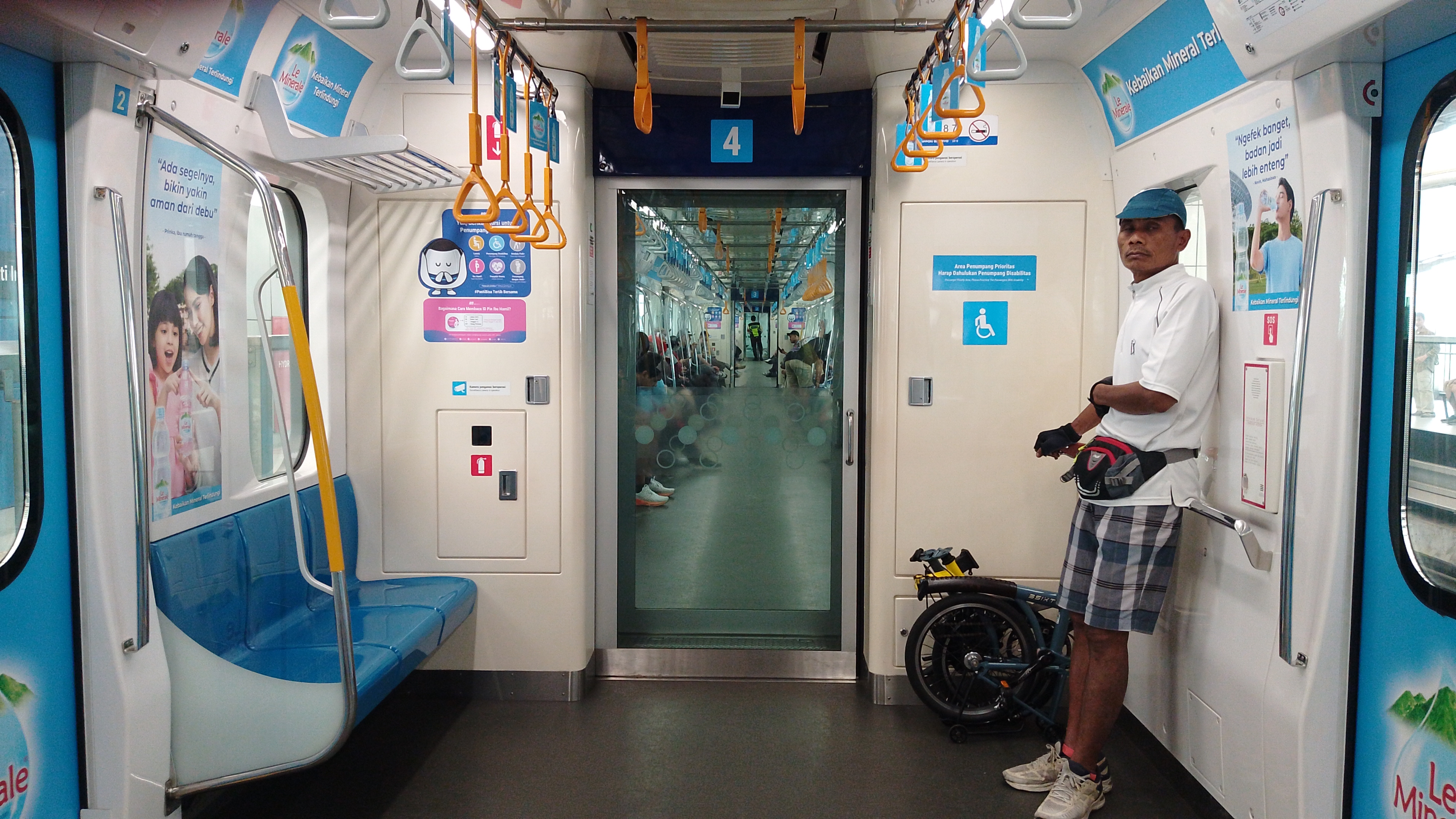
Priority seat and the wheelchair or stroller space

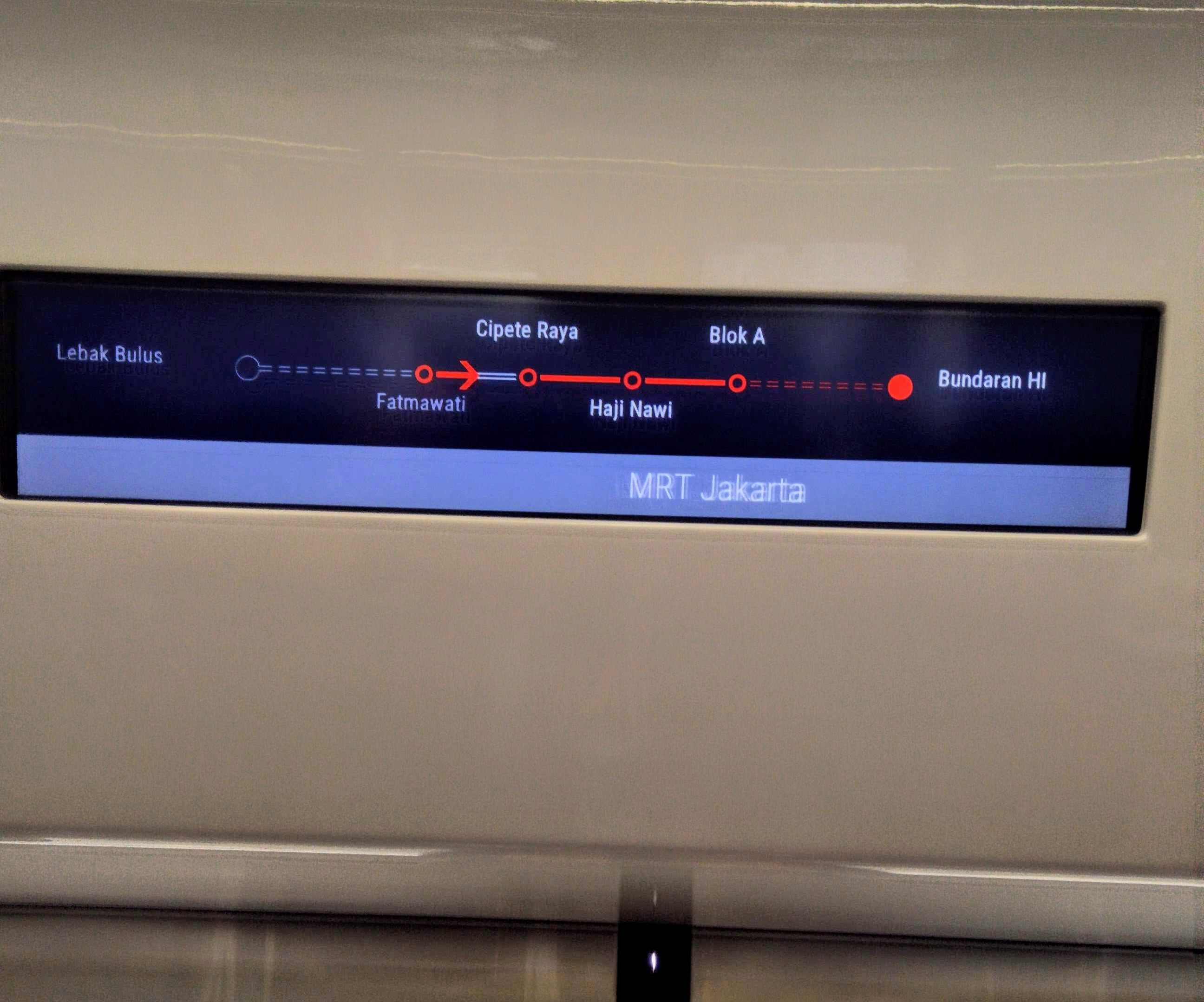
Passenger information display

== In popular culture ==
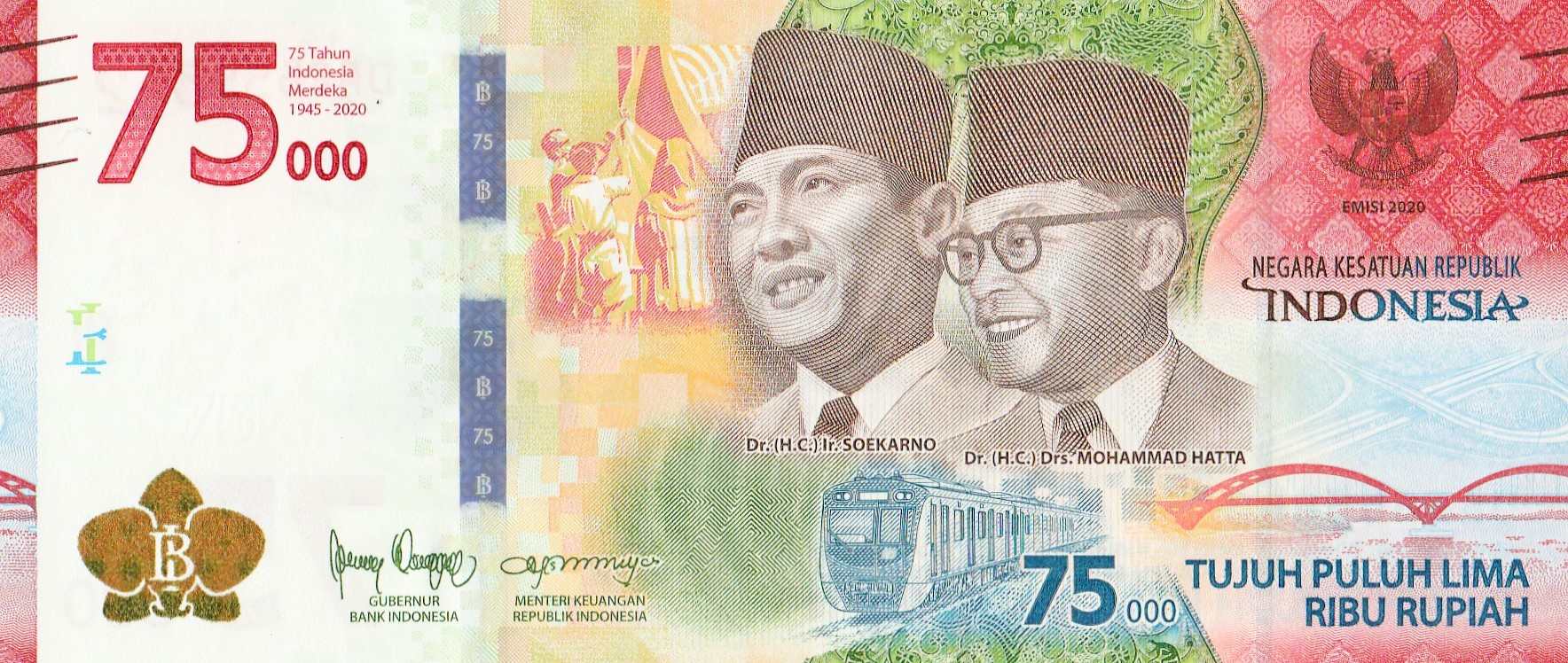
A Ratangga on the special edition 75 thousand rupiah banknote

The Ratangga and part of the North-South MRT Line tunnel are featured on the front of the Rp75,000 design. The electric railway train is placed just below the images of Sukarno and Mohammad Hatta and next to the Youtefa Bridge and the Rp75,000 currency value text. The Ratangga train is included in the design to symbolise the achievement of infrastructure development in the 75 years of the Republic of Indonesia.
