= South Jakarta =

Coordinates: 6°16′07″S 106°48′22″E

- Administrative city
- Administrative city of South Jakarta; Kota Administrasi Jakarta Selatan

Other transcription(s)
  - Betawi: Jakartè Belah Udik
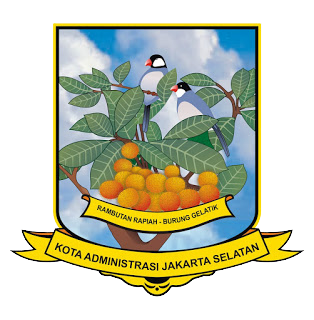
- Seal
- Motto: Rambutan rapiah – Burung gelatik
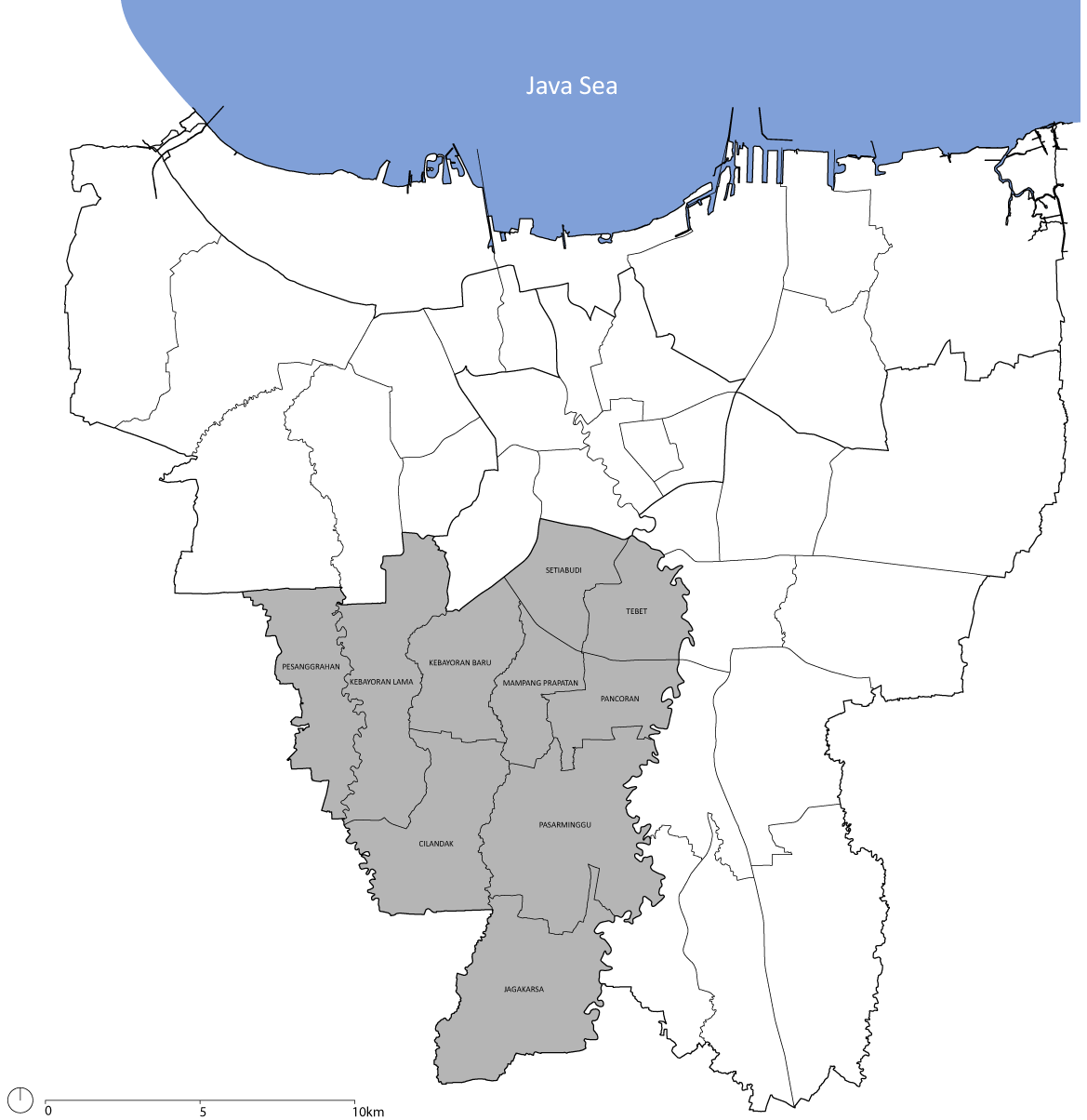
- Country: Indonesia
- Special Region: Jakarta
- Founded: 28 August 1978

Government
  - Mayor: Muhammad Anwar
  - Vice Mayor: Ali Murtadho

Area
  - Total: 144.75 km^{2} (55.89 sq mi)

Population (mid 2025)
  - Total: 2,323,644
  - Density: 16,053/km^{2} (41,577/sq mi)
- Time zone: UTC+7 (WIB)
- Vehicle registration: B xxxx Sxx
- Website: selatan.jakarta.go.id

South Jakarta (Indonesian: Jakarta Selatan; Betawi: Jakarté Bèludik) abbreviated as Jaksel, is one of the five administrative cities (kota administrasi) which form the Special Capital Region of Jakarta, Indonesia. South Jakarta is not self-governed and does not have a city council, hence it is not classified as a proper municipality. It had a population of 2,062,232 at the 2010 Census; the official estimate as at mid 2025 was 2,323,644 (comprising 1,159,371 males and 1,164,273 females), and it is the third most populous among the five administrative cities of Jakarta, after East Jakarta and West Jakarta. The administrative centre is at Kebayoran Baru.

South Jakarta is bounded by Central Jakarta, West Jakarta, and Matraman District (East Jakarta) to the north, East Jakarta to the east, Depok city to the south, West Jakarta to the northwest, and by Tangerang and South Tangerang cities to the west.

== Districts ==
South Jakarta is subdivided into ten districts (kecamatan), listed below with their areas and their populations at the 2010 Census and according to the mid 2025 official estimates: The districts are subdivided in turn into 65 urban villages (kelurahan).

District	Area (km^{2})	Population (2010 Census)	Population (2025 Estimate)	Population density 2025 (/km^{2})	No. of kelurahan	Names of kelurahan
Jagakarsa ^{(a)}	25.06	310,220	380,002	15,164	6	Ciganjur, Cipedak, Jagakarsa, Lenteng Agung, Srengseng Sawah, Tanjung Barat
Pasar Minggu	21.62	287,731	323,758	14,975	7	Cilandak Timur, Jati Padang, Kebagusan Pasar, Minggu, Pejaten Barat, Pejaten Timur, Ragunan
Cilandak	17.75	189,406	220,659	12,431	5	Cilandak Barat, Cipete Selatan, Gandaria Selatan, Lebak Bulus, Pondok Labu
Pesanggrahan	13.49	211,761	263,379	19,524	5	Bintaro, Pesanggrahan, Petukangan Selatan, Petukangan Utara, Ulujami
Kebayoran Lama	19.06	293,646	329,880	16,835	6	Cipulir, Grogol Selatan, Grogol Utara, Kebayoran Lama Selatan, Kebayoran Lama Utara, Pondok Pinang
Kebayoran Baru	12.69	141,714	147,172	11,597	10	Cipete Utara, Gandaria Utara, Gunung, Kramat Pela, Melawai, Petogogan, Pulo, Rawa Barat, Selong, Senayan
Mampang Prapatan	7.94	141,859	151,352	19,062	5	Bangka, Kuningan Barat, Mampang Prapatan, Pela Mampang, Tegal Parang
Pancoran	8.87	147,972	173,723	19,585	6	Cikoko, Duren Tiga, Kalibata, Pancoran, Pengadegan, Rawajati
Tebet	9.35	209,041	229,830	24,581	7	Bukit Duri, Kebon Baru, Manggarai Selatan, Manggarai, Menteng Dalam, Tebet Barat, Tebet Timur
Setiabudi	8.92	128,882	112,890	12,656	8	Guntur, Karet Kuningan, Karet Semanggi, Karet, Kuningan Timur, Menteng Atas, Pasar Manggis, Setiabudi
Totals	144.75	2,062,232	2,323,644	16,053	65	

Notes: (a) Lenteng Agung and Tanjung Barat kelurahan, in the northeast of Jagakarsa District, project into the southeast of Pasar Minggu District.

== Economy ==
In the days following World War II, South Jakarta was planned to be a satellite city (especially the Kebayoran Baru area) and use the oriental concept. This area also contains some industrial centers for different types of commodities. South Jakarta is a prosperous administrative city compared to the others, with much middle-to-upper class housing and major business centres. South Jakarta has the highest Human Development Index of all Jakarta's administrative cities, with an HDI of 0.833.

Much of the central business district is concentrated in Setiabudi, South Jakarta, such as Sudirman Central Business District (SCBD) in Senayan, Kebayoran Baru. Initially, SCBD was a service provider and real estate investment, but nowadays, it is becoming the most integrated mixed-use area in Indonesia.

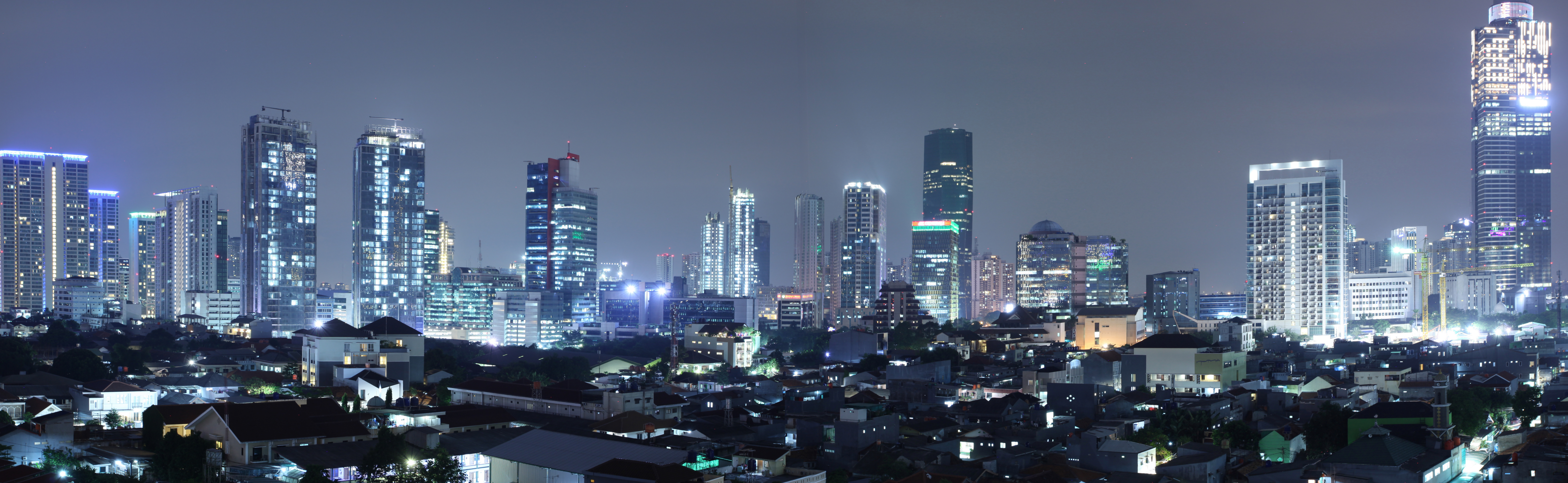
Jakarta skyline at night. Business District area at Jalan Rasuna Said, South Jakarta.

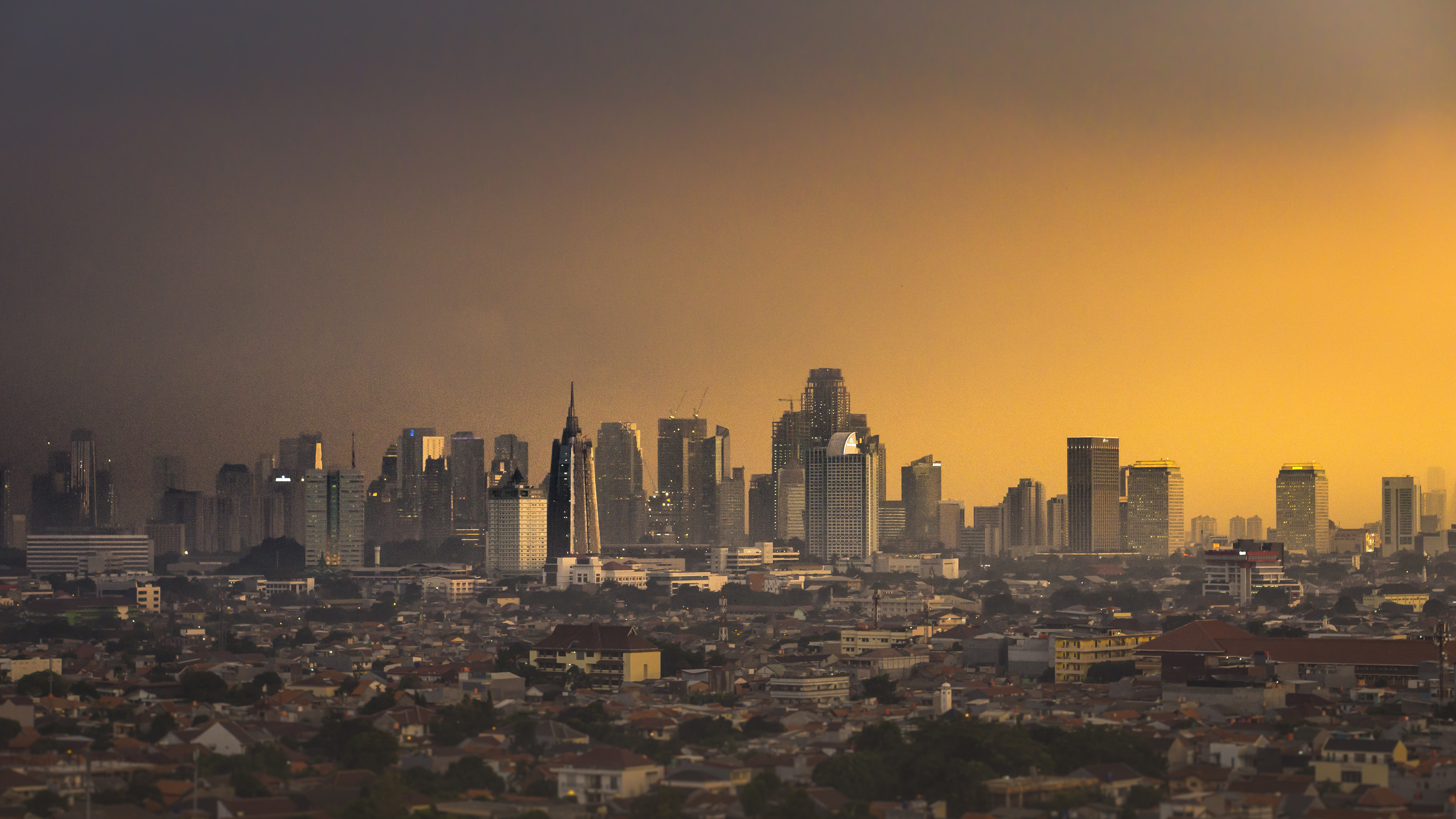
Jakarta skyline during afternoon.

== Public Transportation ==
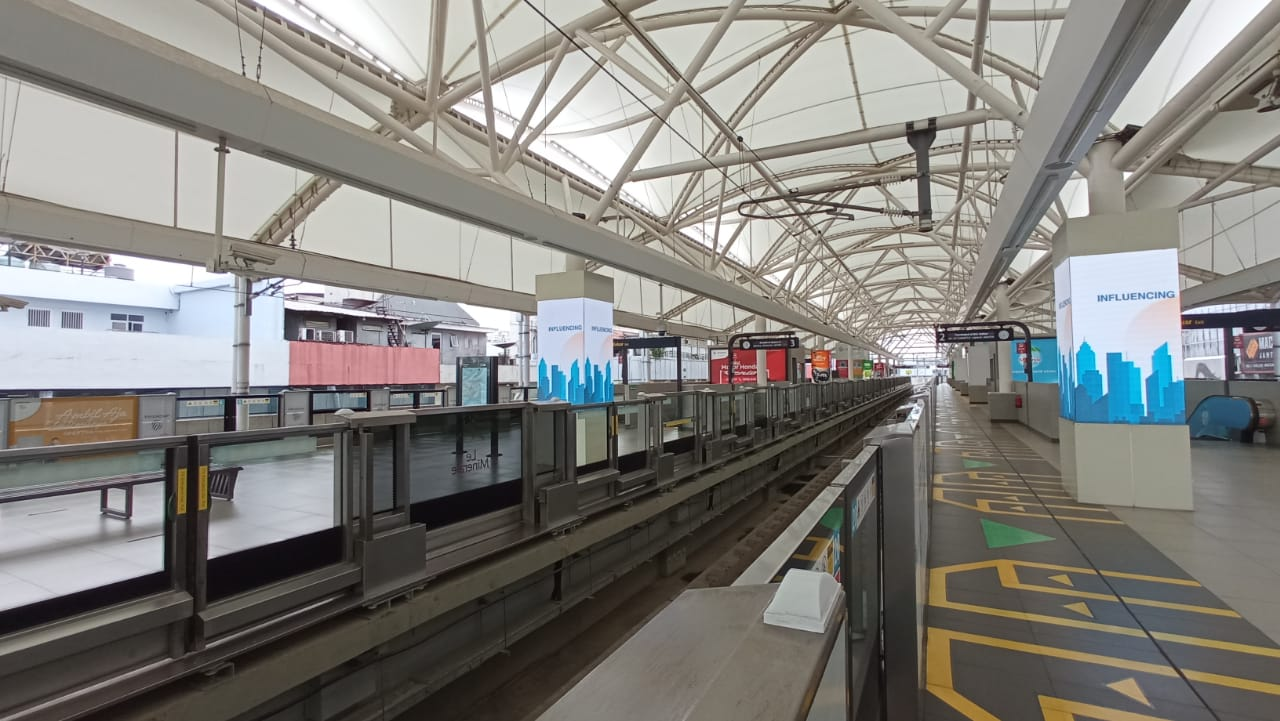
Platform in Blok M MRT station

For road-based public transportation, South Jakarta has several corridors served by Transjakarta BRT and its feeder so-called Mikrotrans

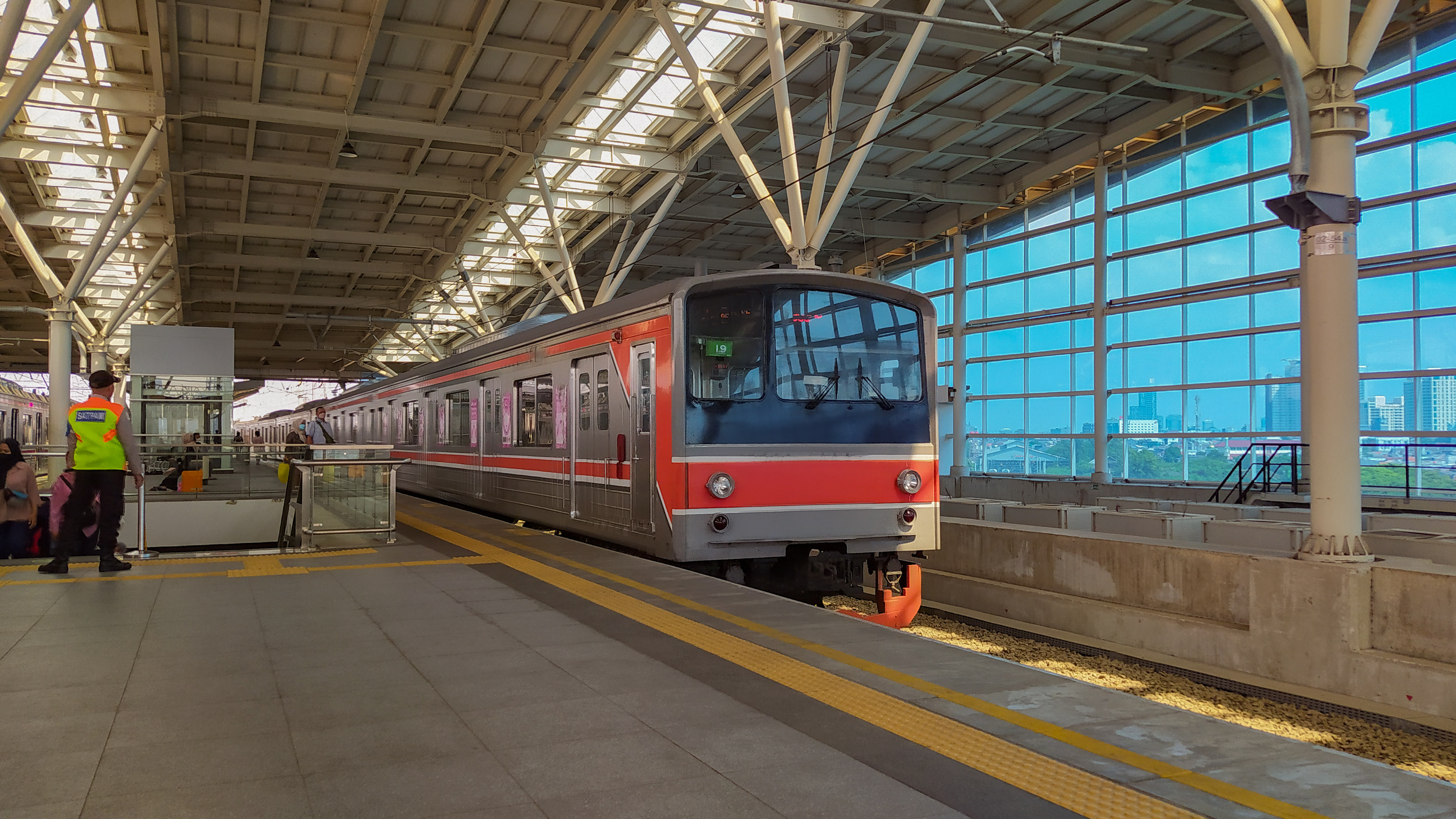
KRL Commuter stop at Manggarai station

South Jakarta also has Commuter rail: KRL Commuter, Light rapid transit: Jabodebek LRT, dan Mass rapid transit: Jakarta MRT. Manggarai station is the biggest railway station according to its land and building in province of Jakarta.

== See also ==
- Jakarta
- East Jakarta
- West Jakarta
- Depok
