= Jalan M.H. Thamrin =

Major thoroughfare in Jakarta, Indonesia

Coordinates: 6.190498°S 106.822924°E

- Thamrin Avenue
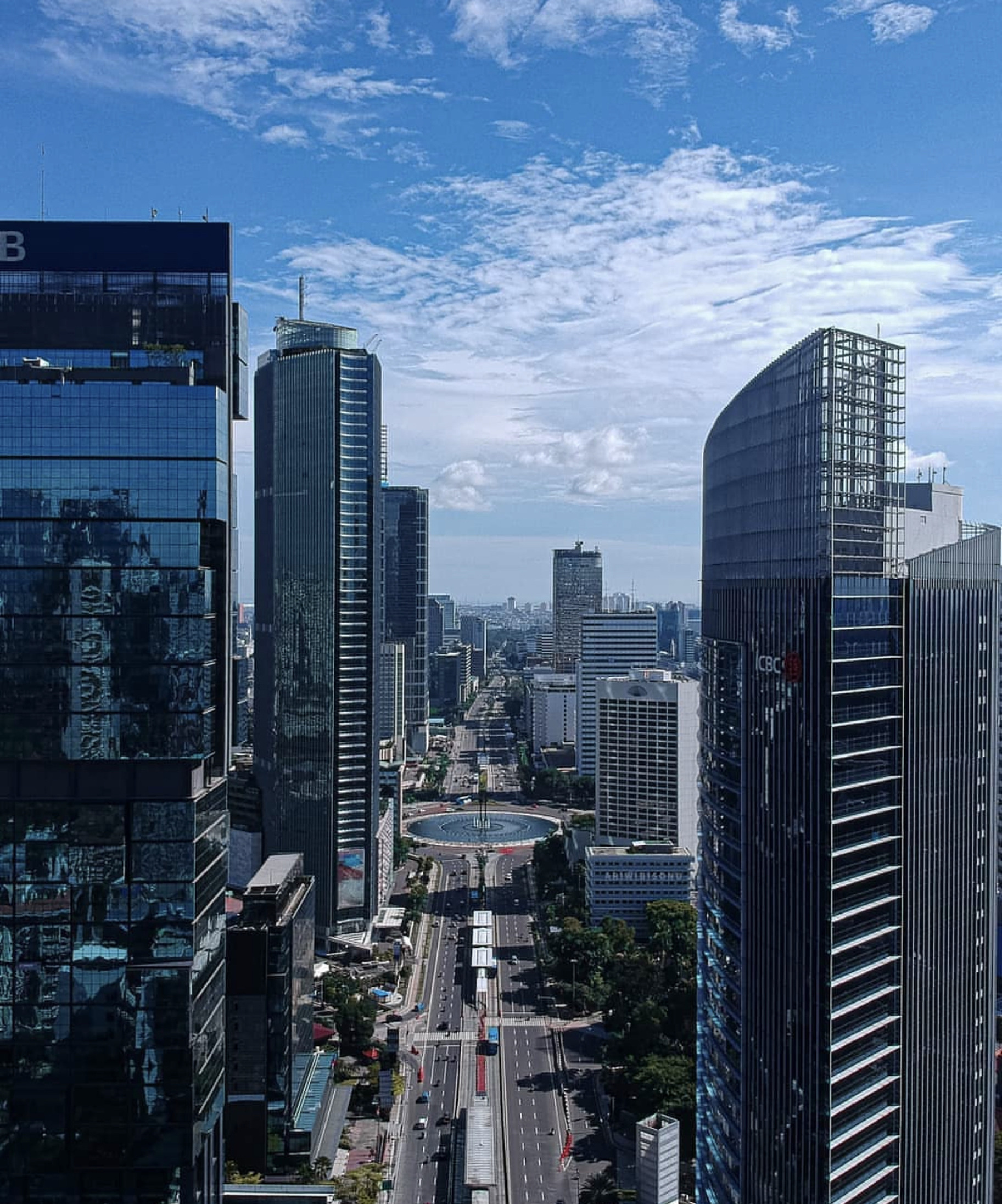
- Thamrin Avenue, Central Jakarta
- Interactive map of Jalan M.H. Thamrin
- Former name: Djalan M.H. Thamrin
- Namesake: Mohammad Husni Thamrin
- Owner: Government of Special Region of Jakarta
- Maintained by: Office of Public Works (Dinas Pekerjaan Umum) of Special Region of Jakarta
- Length: 2.4 km (1.5 mi)
- Location: Central Jakarta
- Nearest metro station: Dukuh Atas BNI, Bundaran HI Bank Jakarta
- South end: West Flood Canal bridge / Jalan Jenderal Sudirman
- Major junctions: Jl. Budi Kemuliaan-Jl. Medan Merdeka Selatan, Jl. Kebon Sirih, Jl. KH. Wahid Hasyim, Bundaran HI roundabout
- North end: Thamrin Fountain at Bank Indonesia Roundabout

Construction
- Construction start: 1949
- Completed: 1953
- Inauguration: January 1951

Jalan M.H. Thamrin or Jalan Thamrin (M.H. Thamrin Avenue or Thamrin Avenue) is a major thoroughfare in Jakarta, Indonesia. The road is located at the center of Jakarta, running from the north end of Jalan Jenderal Sudirman at West Flood Canal at the south end to the roundabout near Arjuna Wijaya Statue Jakarta at the north end. Developed in the 1950s, the road was a landmark of post-colonial Indonesia and continues to have a prominent importance in Jakarta.

== Description ==
Thamrin Road is classified as a secondary arterial road in Jakarta.

The road passes through five urban administrative villages:

- Gambir, Gambir, Central Jakarta
- Kebon Sirih, Menteng, Central Jakarta
- Gondangdia, Menteng, Central Jakarta
- Menteng, Menteng, Central Jakarta
- Kebon Melati, Tanah Abang, Central Jakarta

Thamrin Road is closed to traffic every Sunday from 5:30 until 10:00 as part of Jakarta Car Free Days campaign. The Thamrin road is one of the Odd–even Traffic Restriction Scheme implementation zones (Monday to Friday, 06:00-10:00 and 16:00-21:00)

== History ==
=== Before Thamrin Road ===
The road that would become Thamrin Road first appear around late 1910s-1920s as a small lane running from Koningsplein West (now Medan Merdeka Barat) to Kebon Sirih. This lane was known as Gang Timboel. Prominent landmark near this small lane was a 19th-century Armenian Church for the Armenian community of Batavia. The church has been demolished. The former location of the Armenian Church is the green within the complex of Bank Indonesia.

=== 1950s Kebayoran Baru ===
The development of the suburb Kebayoran in 1949 raised the need to link the suburb with the city center of Jakarta, and thus work on a new "highway" began in the same year. The northern half of this new highway received the name Jalan M.H. Thamrin by January 1951, after Indonesian National Hero Mohammad Husni Thamrin. To avoid the occupation of the newly opened lands by illegal squatters - a major problem at the time - the government sold these lands cheaply to those who committed to build on it within three to six months. Despite this, time extensions had to be granted because buyers could not arrange finance or procure building materials.

Among the early projects situated in Thamrin Road were Sarinah Department Store, Bank Dagang Negara building (now Wisma Mandiri), Ministry of Religion building, Wisma Nusantara, Hotel Indonesia and the prominent Bundaran Hotel Indonesia. Thamrin Road was largely completed by 1953.

=== 1962 Asian Games expansion ===
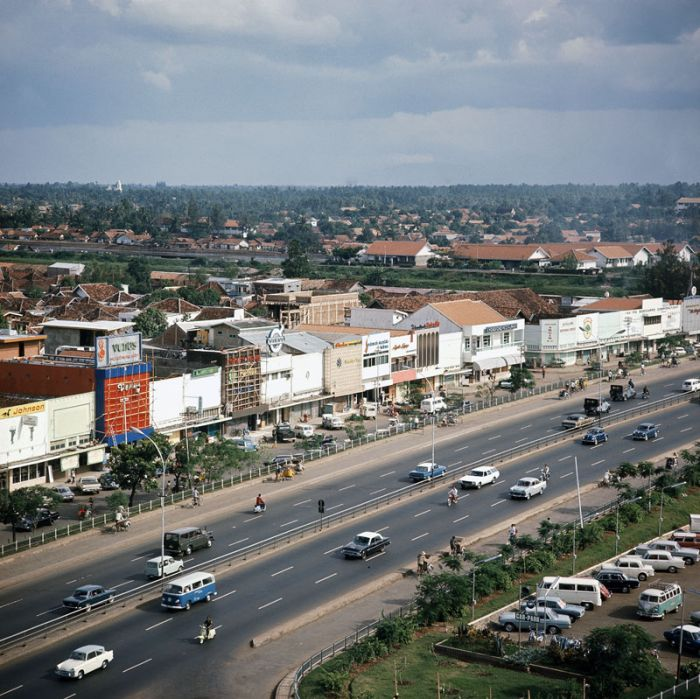
View of the southern half of Thamrin Road from Hotel Kartika Plaza in the 1970s.

With the arrival of the 1962 Asian Games, President Sukarno imagined the VIP visitors for the Asian Games arriving at Kemayoran Airport, drove along Thamrin Road, be greeted by the Welcome Monument and stayed at Hotel Indonesia. For the Games itself, the same VIP visitors would be driven along Sudirman Road over the Semanggi cloverleaf bridge into the newly opened Gelora Bung Karno sports complex where the competitions would take place. For the purpose of the game, both Thamrin and Sudirman Road were widened in the early 1960s. A regulation was also established which requires buildings along Thamrin Road to be minimum five-stories-high. This was difficult to achieve due to lack of funding and commercial building expertise at that time, and the fact that there were already several two-story government buildings along Thamrin Road.

In the beginning of 1970s, Thamrin Road was already a major thoroughfare of Jakarta as envisaged by Sukarno. Buildings reached a minimum height of five stories e.g. ICA building (later the United Nations), Hotel Asoka, the Australian Embassy, and the state-owned developer Pembangunan Perumahan. Sudirman Road was still relatively devoid of development during the early 1970s compare with Thamrin Road, with the exception of the Gelora Bung Karno Sports Complex.

Several parades were enacted along the major thoroughfare, including Jakarta's anniversary parade and Independence Day parade.

=== Jalan MH Thamrin Pedestrian-Way Revitalization ===
Due to its strategic location, close to key landmarks such as Bundaran Hotel Indonesia, Monumen Selamat Datang, and Monumen Nasional, and as the first business district in Jakarta, Jalan MH Thamrin has significant historical value in the city's growth.

To address the growth along Jalan MH Thamrin, a study for the redevelopment of Jalan MH Thamrin, including Bundaran Hotel Indonesia, was proposed in 1985. The focus was on improving the quality of pedestrian pathways and enhancing accessibility to public transportation. Well-designed pedestrian pathways aimed to connect TransJakarta Corridor 1 (Jakarta's first BRT corridor) and prepare for MRT accessibility, integrating the road with surrounding buildings.

The negotiation process lasted 17 years and involved five different master plans due to concerns from landowners, primarily regarding security. Led by Governor Sutiyoso, the study and negotiations were carried out by the Provincial Government of Jakarta, supported by Pusat Studi Urban Desain (PSUD), and Pandega Desain Weharima (PDW). This process encountered setbacks following the 2003 Marriott Hotel bombing, which led to the need for renegotiation of the initial agreements.

This initiative became a prototype for managing pedestrian areas through public-private partnerships. Landowners who contributed part of their property for public pathways were given incentives as recognition. The boundaries between private land and pedestrian pathways were marked with gold-colored metal strips.

=== Transjakarta ===
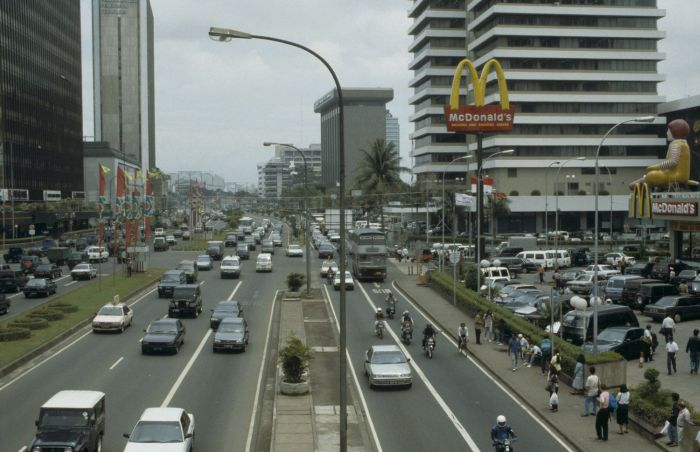
Thamrin Road in 1993 before the introduction of Transjakarta BRT

Up until the 2000s, Thamrin Road consisted of four carriageways consisting of local-express lanes, 3 lanes for the express lane and 2 lanes for the local lane. With the introduction of Transjakarta BRT in 2004, one of the lane of the express lanes was converted into a dedicated lane for the BRT. Eventually, Thamrin Road was made a dual carriageway by removing the separator of the local and express lanes.

=== Motorcycle ===
The Jakarta administration in December 2014 introduced a ban on motorcycles from using Jalan Thamrin and the adjoining Jalan Medan Merdeka Barat.

The ban was lifted by governor Anies Baswedan in 2018.

== Major buildings along the MH Thamrin Road ==
Sorted from North to South
West	East
Bank Indonesia	Ministry of Energy and Mineral Resources
Bank Indonesia	Indosurya Finance Center
Bank Indonesia	Bangkok Bank
Thamrin Clock Tower (Formerly located at the middle of the intersection with the Kebon Sirih Street. The Clock Tower is now temporarily moved to the National Monument complex for the construction of the second phase of the North-South Line of the Jakarta MRT)
Ministry of Religious Affairs	Wisma Mandiri (Branch office of Bank Mandiri and Bank Syariah Indonesia)
Ministry of Religious Affairs	Thamrin 10
Coordinating Ministry for Maritime and Investments Affairs, National Research and Innovation Agency, and the National Standardization Agency	Thamrin 10
Menara Thamrin (Head office of Lintasarta, Embassy of Argentina)	Sari Pacific Hotel
Gedung Jaya	Menara Cakrawala (Skyline Building)
Intersection with the Kyai Haji Wahid Hasyim Street
General Election Supervisory Agency	Sarinah Building
Menara Topas ( (Timor-Leste) Embassy of East Timor)	Sarinah Building
Lippo Thamrin	Embassy of France
Empty	Sinar Mas Land Plaza
Indonesia-1 Tower	Empty (Previously there was Wisma Kosgoro, but it was demolished due to a massive fire in 2015)
Embassy of Japan	Pertamina Lubricants
Plaza Indonesia, The Plaza, The Keraton, and Grand Hyatt Jakarta	Plaza Bank Index
Plaza Indonesia, The Plaza, The Keraton, and Grand Hyatt Jakarta	Pullman Hotel Jakarta
Plaza Indonesia, The Plaza, The Keraton, and Grand Hyatt Jakarta	Wisma Nusantara
Hotel Indonesia Roundabout (Selamat Datang Monument)
Hotel Indonesia Kempinsiki, BCA Tower, and Grand Indonesia	Deutsche Bank ( Embassy of Belgium)
Hotel Indonesia Kempinsiki, BCA Tower, and Grand Indonesia	Mandarin Oriental, Jakarta
Hotel Indonesia Kempinsiki, BCA Tower, and Grand Indonesia	Embassy of Germany
Thamrin Nine Complex, UOB Plaza, & The Autograph Tower	The City Tower ( Embassy of Chile)
Dukuh Atas BNI MRT station and BNI City railway station (Soekarno–Hatta Airport Rail Link)	Sudirman railway station (KRL Commuterline)

== Intersections ==
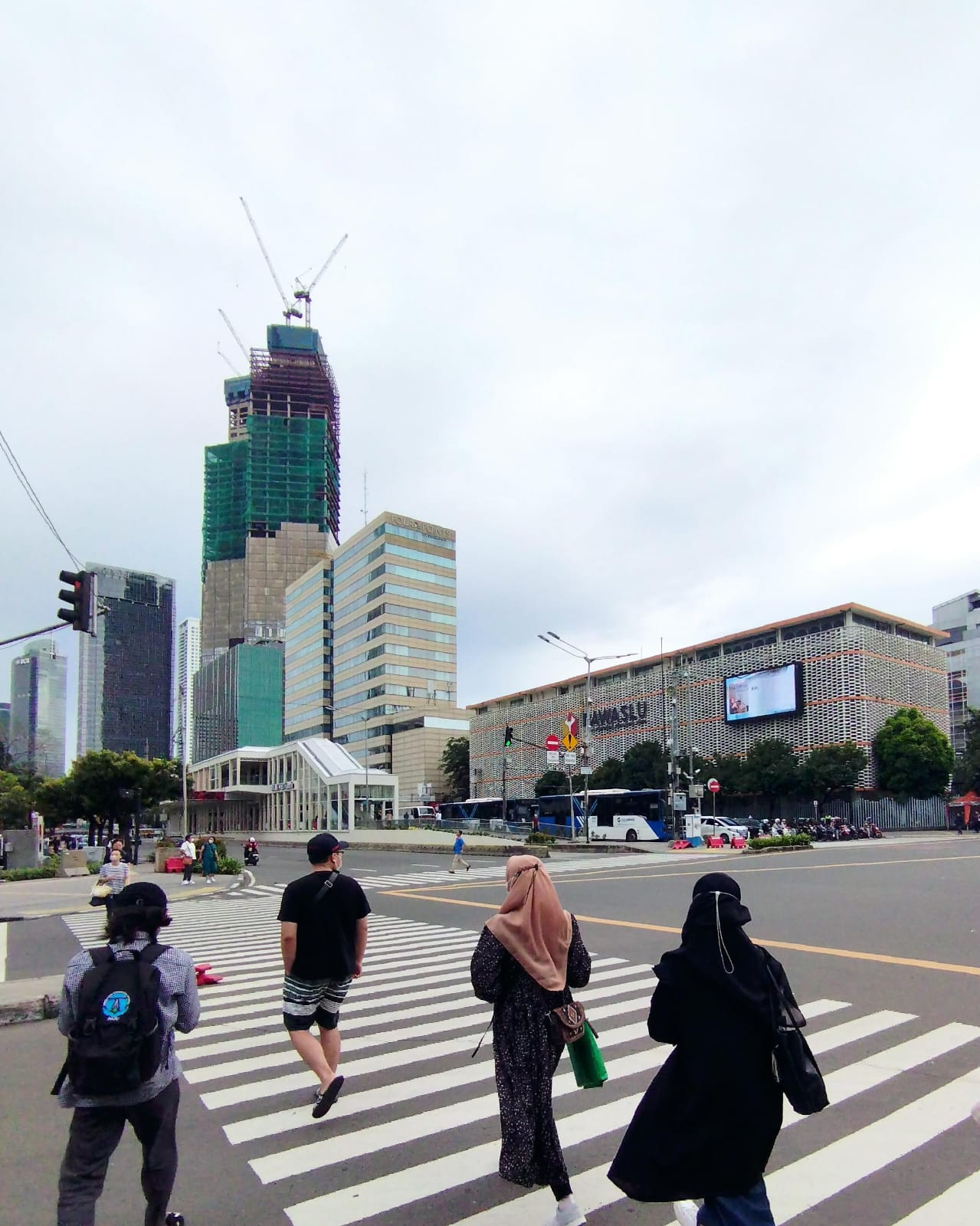
K.H. Wahid Hasyim Street intersection

There are four intersections:

- Bank Indonesia Fountain Roundabout, to West Medan Merdeka Street (north), Budi Kemuliaan Street (west), and South Medan Merdeka Street (east)
- Kebon Sirih Street intersection
- K.H. Wahid Hasyim Street intersection, also known as Sarinah intersection
- Hotel Indonesia Roundabout, to Jalan Jenderal Sudirman (south) and Menteng (southeast)

== Transportation ==
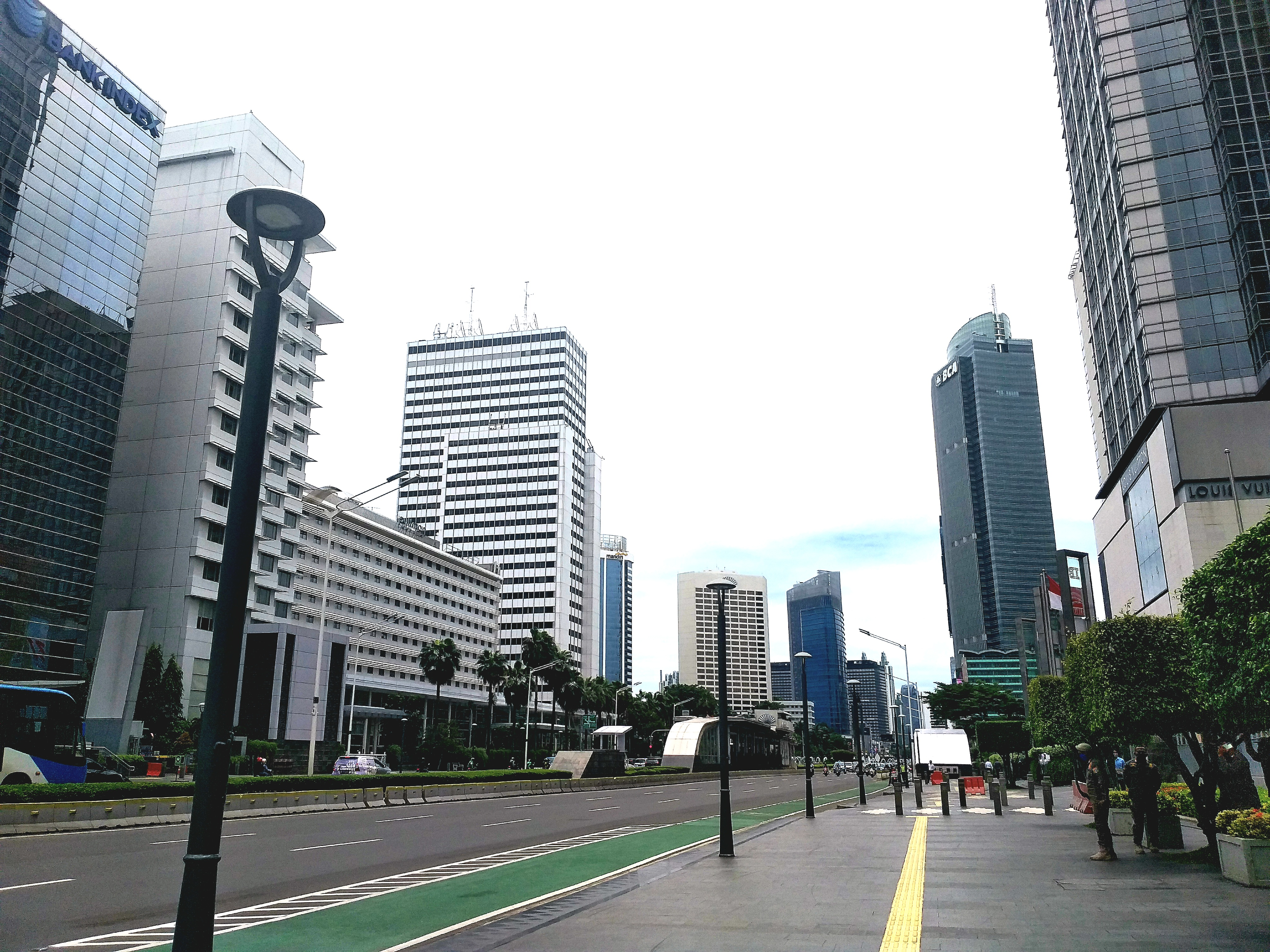
M.H Thamrin street

Jalan M.H. Thamrin is currently served by Dukuh Atas BNI and Bundaran HI Bank Jakarta stations of Jakarta MRT. Sudirman station of KRL Commuterline and BNI City station of Soekarno–Hatta Airport Rail Link are located at the south end of the road as a part of Dukuh Atas TOD.

=== Bus routes ===
==== TransJakarta ====
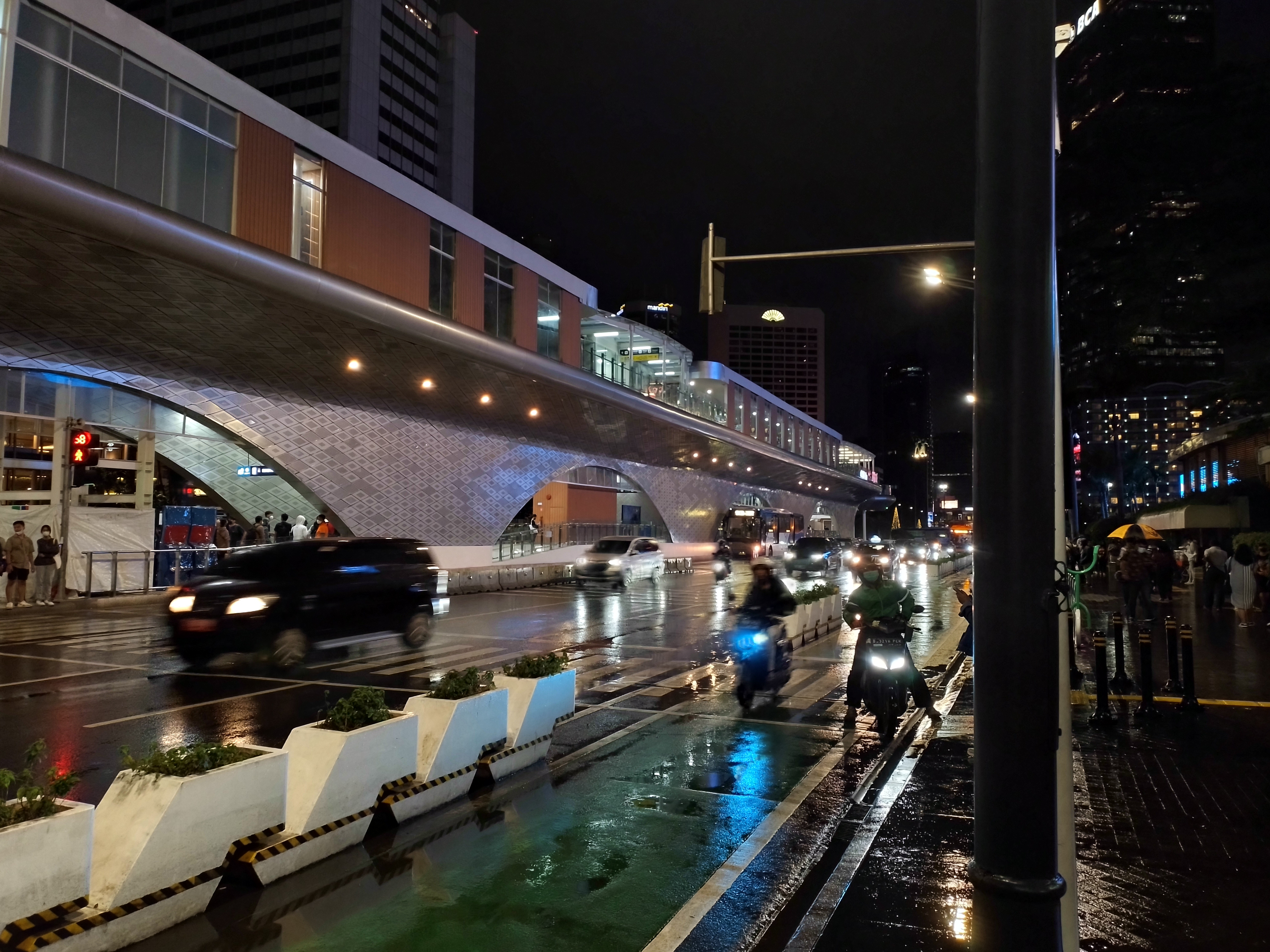
The Bundaran HI Astra Transjakarta BRT station

There are four stops for the TransJakarta busway along Jalan M.H. Thamrin, mainly serving for Route 1, 6A, and 6B. They are:

- Tosari, close to Grand Indonesia Shopping Town, in front of UOB Plaza and The City Tower.
- M.H. Thamrin, in front of Sarinah Building, General Election Supervisory Agency (Badan Pengawas Pemilihan Umum) and Menara Eksekutif.
- Kebon Sirih, in front of Bank Indonesia (north) and near Wisma Mandiri (south).
- Bundaran HI Astra, in front of Bundaran HI with a passageway linking the stop with Bundaran HI Bank Jakarta MRT station.

The Transjakarta routes that serves the M.H. Thamrin Road are:

- BRT Corridors
  - Blok M-Kota
  - Ragunan-Balai Kota via Kuningan
  - Ragunan-Balai Kota via Semanggi
- Inner city feeder
  - 1N Tanah Abang–Blok M
  - 1P Senen–Blok M
  - 9D Pasar Minggu–Tanah Abang
- RoyalTrans
  - 1T Cibubur Junction–Kota
- #jakartaexplorer tour buses
  - BW4 (Jakarta skyscrapers)

==== Other buses ====
Apart from Transjakarta, here are the list of public transportation routes that serve the M.H. Thamrin Road:

- Metromini S640 Pasar Minggu-Tanah Abang
- Metromini P15 Senen-Setiabudi
- Kopaja P19 Tanah Abang-Ragunan
- Kopaja S602 AC Monas-Ragunan
- PPD AC11 Pulo Gadung-Grogol
- PPD AC16 Lebak Bulus-Rawamangun
- PPD P67 Blok M-Senen
- PPD 213 Grogol-Kampung Melayu
- Mayasari Bakti AC52 Tanah Abang-Bekasi (via Komdak - Sudirman - Thamrin - Bulak Kapal)
- Mayasari Bakti AC52A Tanah Abang-Jatiasih (via Komdak - Sudirman - Thamrin - Jatibening)
- Mayasari Bakti AC62 Senen-Poris Plawad (via Slipi - Sudirman - Thamrin - Karawaci)
- Mayasari Bakti AC70 Tanah Abang-Kp. Rambutan (via Komdak - Sudirman - Thamrin - UKI - Ps. Rebo)
- Mayasari Bakti AC70A Tanah Abang-Cileungsi (via Komdak - Sudirman - Thamrin - Cibubur)
- Bianglala Metropolitan AC44 Senen-Ciledug (via Stasiun Gambir - Sudirman - Thamrin - Kebayoran Lama)
- Bianglala Metropolitan AC57 Harmoni-Ciputat (via Sudirman - Thamrin - Fatmawati - Lebak Bulus)
- Bianglala Metropolitan AC76 Senen-Ciputat (via Sudirman - Thamrin - Fatmawati - Lebak Bulus)
- Jasa Utama P125 Blok M-Tanjung Priok (via Sudirman - Thamrin - Ps. Baru)

=== Train lines ===
==== Jakarta MRT ====
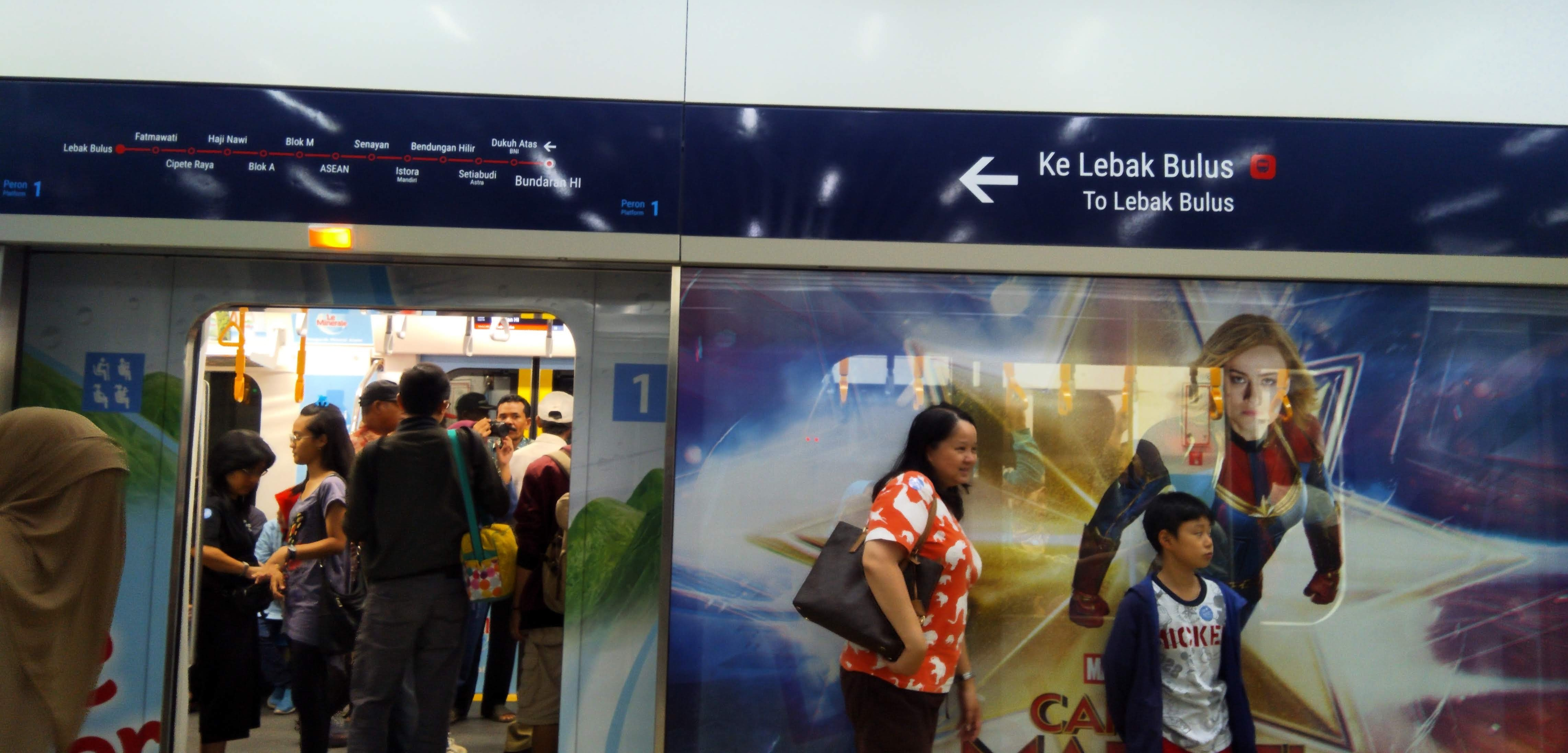
The platform of the Bundaran HI Bank Jakarta MRT station underneath the M.H. Thamrin Road

The M.H. Thamrin Road is also served by the North–South Line of the Jakarta MRT There are two stations:

- Bundaran HI Bank Jakarta, near Plaza Indonesia, Pullman Hotel, Wisma Nusantara and Selamat Datang Monument
- Thamrin (under construction), near BPPT, Bank Indonesia Head Office, the Ministry of Religious Affairs, Indosurya Finance Center, Wisma Mandiri, and Bangkok Bank

==== KRL Commuterline ====
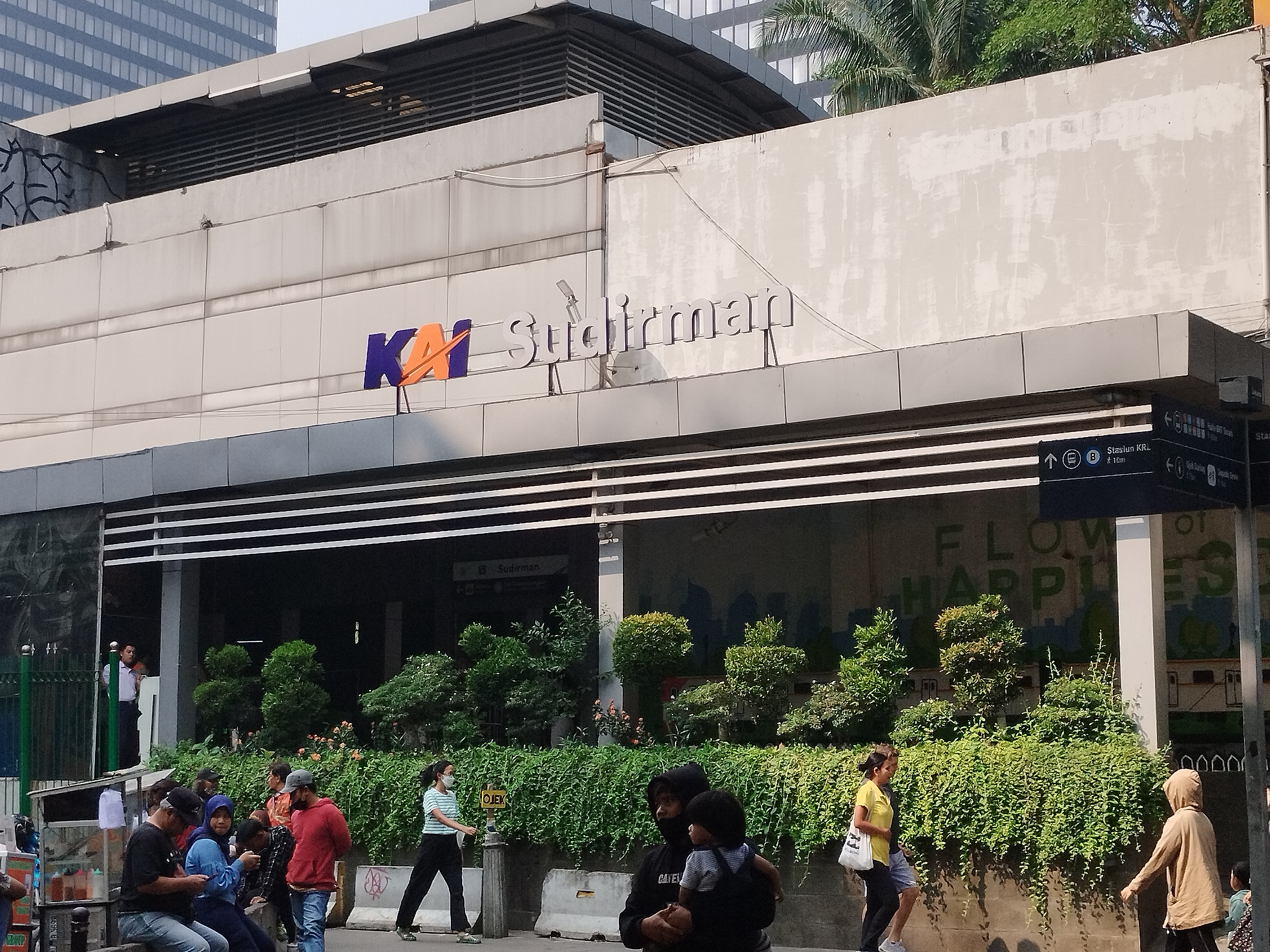
The frontage of the Sudirman railway station

This road is also accessible with the Cikarang Loop Line of the KRL Commuterline There is one station:

- Sudirman Station

==== Airport Railink ====
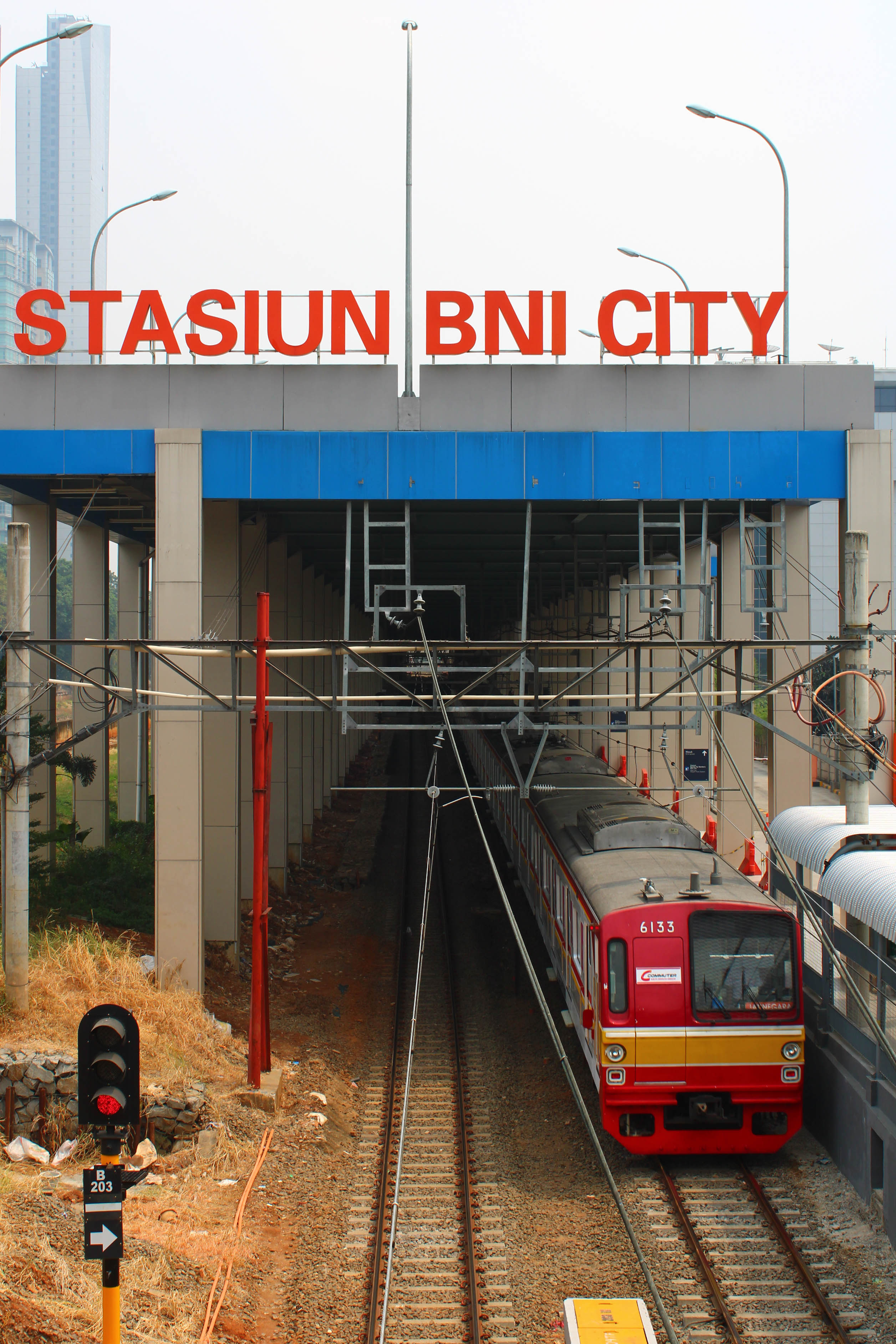
A KRL Commuterline train passing through the BNI City railway station

M.H. Thamrin Road is also served by the Soekarno–Hatta Airport Rail Link There is one station:

- BNI City Station

== See also ==
- History of Jakarta
- Sarinah
- Mohammad Husni Thamrin

== Works cited ==
- Berkmoes, R.V. et al. ¨Indonesia¨. Lonely Planet, 2010.
- Merrillees, Scott (2015). Jakarta: Portraits of a Capital 1950-1980. Jakarta: Equinox Publishing. ISBN 9786028397308.
