= Sarinah Building =

- Gedung Sarinah

- Sarinah Department Store after its renovation
- Interactive map of the Sarinah Building area

Record height
- Tallest in Indonesia from 1962 to 1967^{[I]}
- Preceded by: position created
- Surpassed by: Wisma Nusantara

General information
- Type: Commercial
- Architectural style: International style, Postmodernism
- Location: Jalan M. H. Thamrin No. 11; Gondangdia, Menteng, Central Jakarta, Indonesia
- Coordinates: 6.187587°S 106.823829°E
- Opened: August 1966 (renovated in 2020-2022)
- Owner: Sarinah

Design and construction
- Architecture firm: Perentjana Djaja; Obayashi Corporation
- Developer: Government of Indonesia; C. Itoh & Co.
- Main contractor: Obayashi Corporation

Other information
- Public transit: M.H. Thamrin

Website
- www.sarinah.co.id

Sarinah Building (Indonesian: Gedung Sarinah) is a 74-metre tall 15-floor department store in Gondangdia, Menteng, Central Jakarta, Indonesia, owned by the titular company. It was the first skyscraper to be built in Jakarta. Sarinah is located at the intersection of Jalan Kyai Haji Wahid Hasyim and Jalan M. H. Thamrin. It was Jakarta's first modern department store, famous for having Indonesia's first escalators (installed by Hitachi), for being air-conditioned and for having electronic cash registers.

== History ==
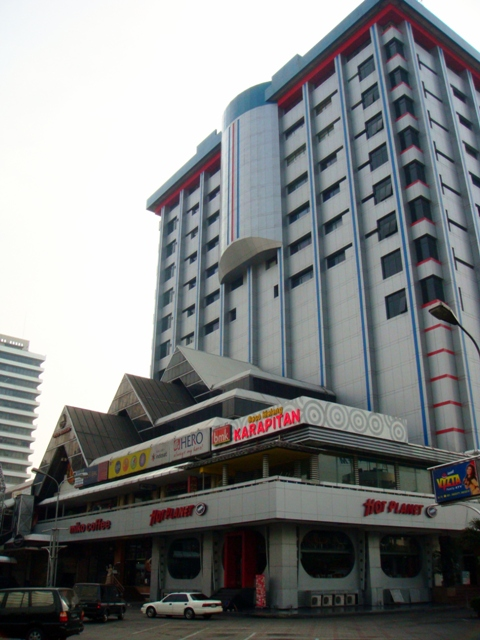
The building prior to renovation

PT Department Store Indonesia "Sarinah" (former company name of Sarinah) first piled the foundation of Sarinah building on 23 April 1963. The building was built by Obayashi Corporation and state-owned construction company Adhi Karya, using Japanese war reparation funds. The building was handed over to Sarinah on 22 December 1965, coinciding with Mother's Day, and was inaugurated on 15 August 1966.

In the 1990s, after leasing out some of its space to McDonald's (its first branch in Indonesia) and Hard Rock Cafe (which later moved to Pacific Place Jakarta), Sarinah managed to rejuvenate itself as a popular place for young people.

=== Expansion ===
Two forty-one story towers are planned to be built in the area to complement the existing shopping center. The new towers will house high end restaurants; offices; and venues for meetings, conferences, and exhibition halls. The existing building will undergo major renovations to restore the originality of the building. The expansion project is expected to start by July 2020 and is projected to be completed in its entirety by mid-2022.

For the renovation to be carried out on the existing building, the management ordered all tenants of to close in a 30 April 2020 memo. Notably the closing of the first McDonald's in Indonesia at the Sarinah location on 10 May 2020 attracted a considerable crowd and legal rebuke for violation of social distancing laws in effect for the COVID-19 pandemic at the time.

After completion of renovations on the existing building, it was opened to public on 22 March, 2022.

== 2016 terrorist incident ==
On 14 January 2016, multiple explosions and gunfire occurred near Sarinah. The Islamic State of Iraq and the Levant (ISIL) claimed responsibility. 8 people were killed, 4 civilians and all 4 attackers.

== Cited works ==
- Merrillees, Scott (2015). Jakarta: Portraits of a Capital 1950–1980. Jakarta: Equinox Publishing. ISBN 978-602-8397-30-8.
- Rimmer, Peter J.; Dick, Howard (2009). The City in Southeast Asia: Patterns, Processes and Policy. Singapore: NUS Press. ISBN 978-9971-69-426-5.
- Shimizu, Hiroshi (2008). Japanese Firms in Contemporary Singapore. Singapore: NUS Press. ISBN 978-9971-69-384-8.
