= Tosari (Transjakarta) =

Bus rapid transit station in Jakarta, Indonesia

1 11 Tosari
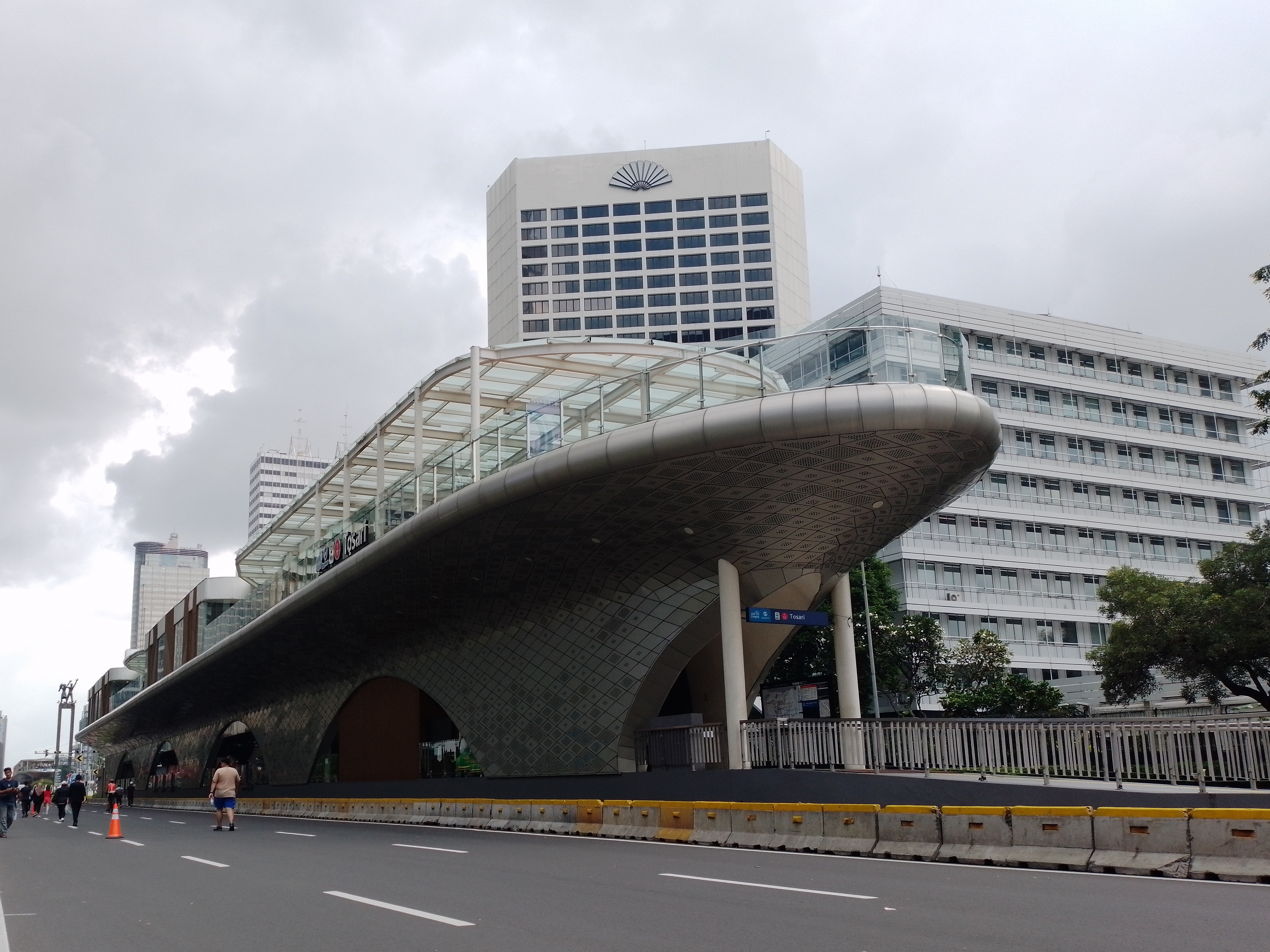
- The new design of the north building of the station

General information
- Location: M.H. Thamrin Street, Menteng, Menteng, Central Jakarta 10310, Jakarta, Indonesia
- Coordinates: 6.1986°S 106.8230°E
- System: Transjakarta bus rapid transit station
- Owner: Transjakarta
- Operator: Transjakarta
- Lines: List of Transjakarta corridors#Corridor 1 List of TransJakarta corridors#Cross-corridor routes
- Platforms: Single island platform
- Connections: Dukuh Atas BNI

Construction
- Structure type: At-grade
- Architect: Kuncara Wicaksana
- Architectural style: Modern • Neo-futurism

Other information
- Status: In service

History
- Opened: 15 January 2004 (soft launching); 1 February 2004 (commercial operation)
- Rebuilt: 2022
- Former names: Tosari ICBC

Services
Preceding		Following
Dukuh Atas towards Blok M	Corridor 1	Bundaran HI Astra towards Kali Besar
Dukuh Atas towards Ragunan	Corridor 6 Route 6B	Bundaran HI Astra towards Balai Kota
Location

Tosari is a Transjakarta bus rapid transit station located at Jalan M.H. Thamrin, Menteng subdistrict (kelurahan), Menteng, Central Jakarta, Indonesia, which serves corridor 1 that runs from north to south. It is located adjacent with Menara BCA and Grand Indonesia to the west, and the German Embassy and Mandarin Oriental, Jakarta to the east.

The station is named after a village with the same name at Tengger Mountains near Mount Bromo in East Java, taken from a street that is now called Dr. Kusuma Atmaja street behind the German Embassy to the east. Tosari and Bundaran HI Astra stations shared the same neo-futurist architecture that resembles "twin luxury cruise ships that ancored at the Selamat Datang Monument."

== History ==
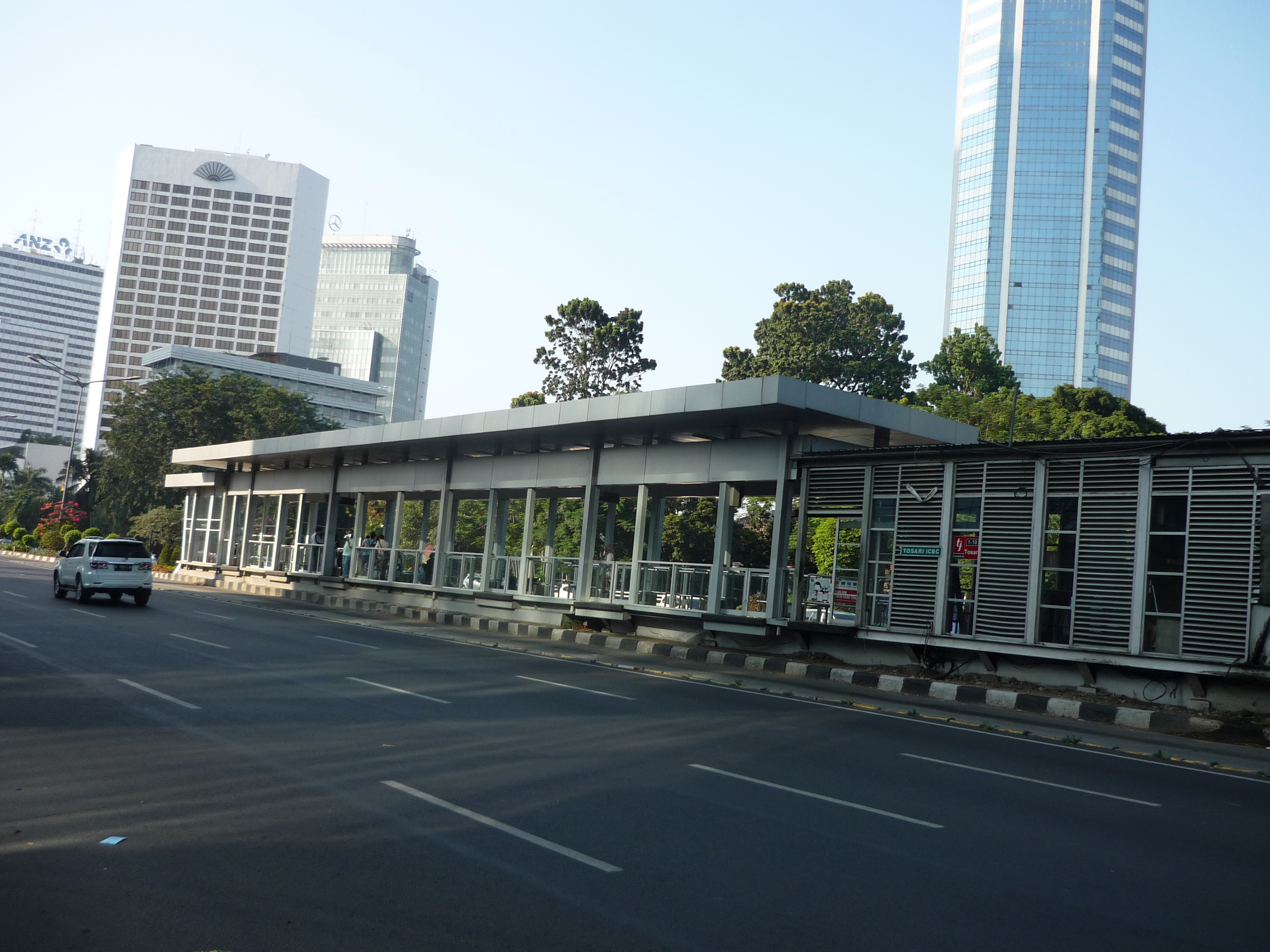
The original south building of the station, 2015

Tosari BRT station began its operational on 15 January 2004, along with the soft operational launch of Transjakarta Corridor 1. The commercial operation was started on 1 February 2004. Its original site is located adjacent with the UOB Plaza to the southwest and The City Tower to the southeast. The station was also referred as Tosari ICBC; however, the name ICBC (Industrial and Commercial Bank of China) was not a part of a naming right deal, but refers to The City Tower which become the branch office of ICBC.

In August 2014, this station was expanded to accommodate passengers from the closed Bundaran HI BRT station due to the construction of the Jakarta MRT. Tosari BRT station's access bridge was equipped with elevators for disabled and had direct connection to the UOB Plaza. However, the east elevator near The City Tower broke up and abandoned. On 14 December 2018, the bridge was closed for demolition and replaced by a pelican crossing at north of the station.

The new building of Tosari station is located slightly to the north, adjacent with Menara BCA and Grand Indonesia. Its construction has been seen since July 2019. The new building started operating on 1 November 2019. Since then, Tosari BRT station is split between the newly-built north building and the original south building, which ceased operating. The north one originally had a curved-shaped entrance that looks similar with the entrances of Bundaran HI MRT station, but was removed in October 2020 after being burned during a protest against a law bill.

On 16 January 2020, Tosari BRT station began to serve as the temporary terminus of corridor 4 due to the construction of the Dukuh Atas LRT station. After the LRT construction completed, corridor 4 returned to its original terminus, Dukuh Atas 2 (now Galunggung) on 20 May 2023.

On 15 April 2022, the north building was closed for revitalization along with 10 other BRT stations to be revitalized. The operational was temporarily moved to the original south building. Besides that, a shuttle bus route between the National Monument (Monas)–Semanggi (1ST) was provided until 11 September 2022. As of 26 December 2022, the revitalized north building of Tosari BRT station has resumed its operations and serving boarding and alighting passengers. The south building had since been abandoned and ultimately demolished sometime around November 2025.

== Building and layout ==
The current design of the north building of Tosari BRT station have two floors with an iconic neo-futuristic design which resembles a cruise ship like the Bundaran HI Astra station. Both stations have batik-inspired facade patterns and arc-shaped platforms.

On the second floor there is an open deck that towards to skyscrapers at Jalan Jenderal Sudirman at the south side and the Selamat Datang Monument at the north. Unlike Bundaran HI Astra, Tosari does not have an extending viewing balcony towards the Selamat Datang Monument. Other facilities on the second floor are toilets, prayer room (musala), waiting area, and commercial areas. The entrance and platform area is on the first floor. There are 18 platform bays (9 for each direction).

West	to Kota and to Balai Kota (Bundaran HI Astra) →
Island platform, the platform doors are opened on the right side of the direction of travel
East	← (Dukuh Atas) to Blok M and to Ragunan

== Non-BRT bus services ==
Type	Route	Destination	Notes
Inner city feeder		Palmerah Station—Dukuh Atas Transport Hub	Inside the station
Inner city feeder		Pasar Minggu—Tanah Abang	Inside the station
Inner city feeder		Senen—Blok M	Outside the station
Royaltrans (premium)		Cibubur—Balai Kota	Outside the station
#jakartaexplorer double decker tour buses		Jakarta Skyscrapers; Pencakar Langit Jakarta	Outside the station

== Places nearby ==
- Thamrin Nine
  - UOB Plaza
    - UOB Indonesia headquarters
  - Autograph Tower
    - Ministry of Creative Economy
  - Agora Mall
- Grand Indonesia
  - BCA Tower
  - Hotel Indonesia
- Mandarin Oriental Jakarta
- Embassy of Germany
- Graha Mandiri
- Deutsche Bank
  - Embassy of Belgium
- The City Tower
  - Embassy of Chile

== Incidents ==
On 8 October 2020, both older south and newer north buildings of the Tosari BRT station was burned by some agent provocateur during the Omnibus law protest; along with other stations on corridor 1 such as Karet Sudirman, Bundaran HI, Sarinah (now renamed M.H. Thamrin) and Harmoni Central.

== Gallery ==
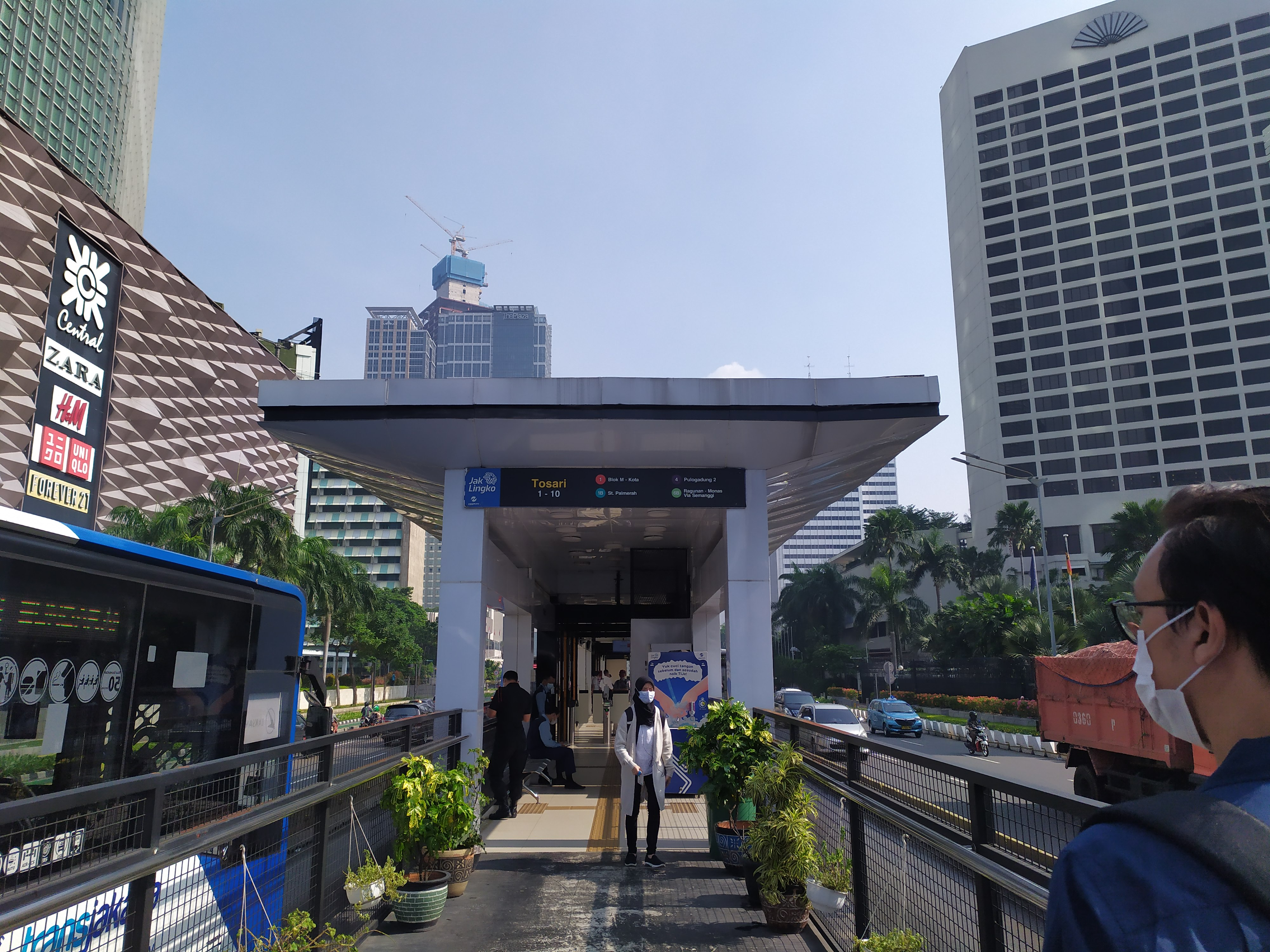
The entrance of the north building on its original design, seen in October 2021. Note that the curved-shaped entrance was removed after the burning incident during the Omnibus Law protests a year earlier.

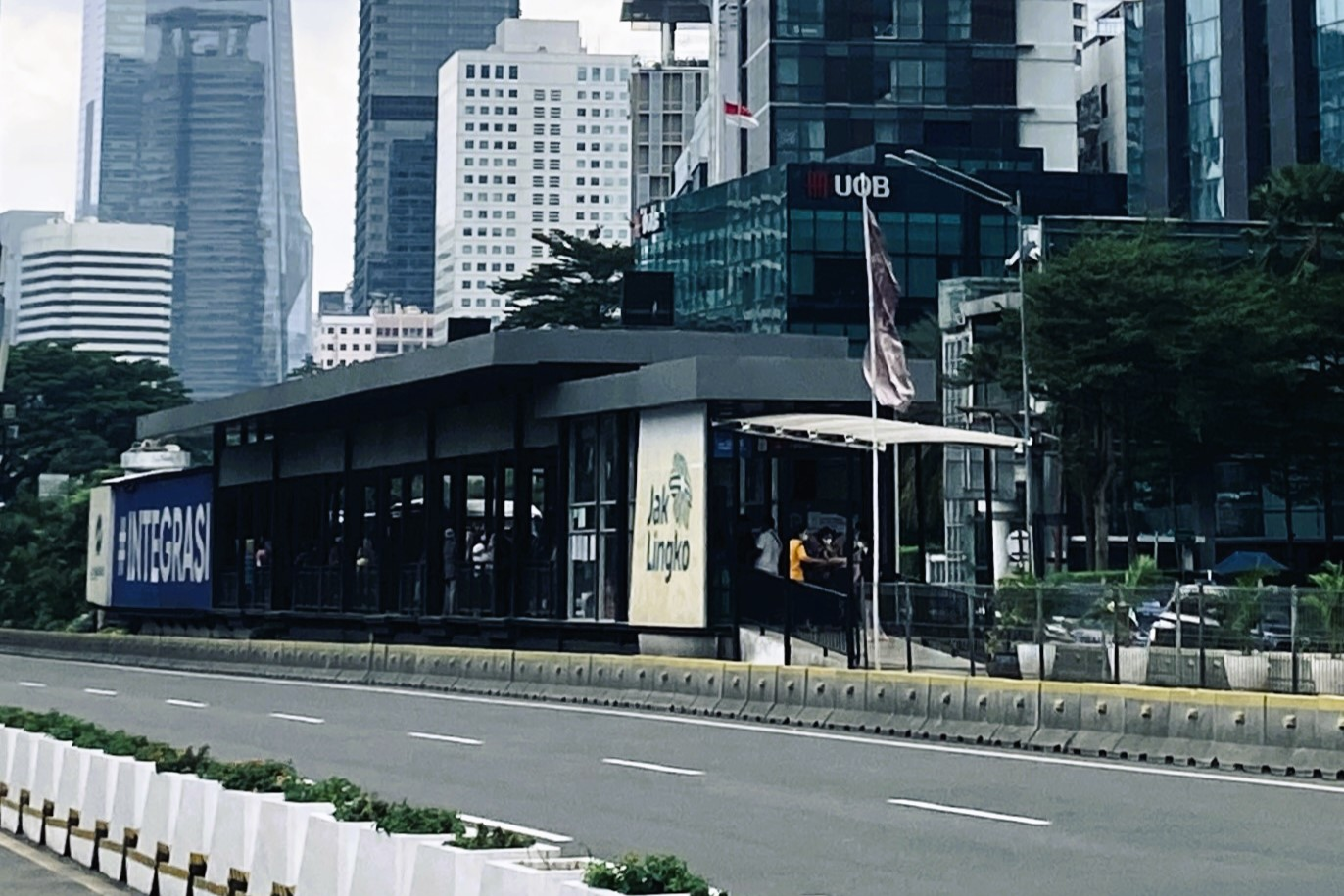
The south building of the station seen in 2022, now demolished

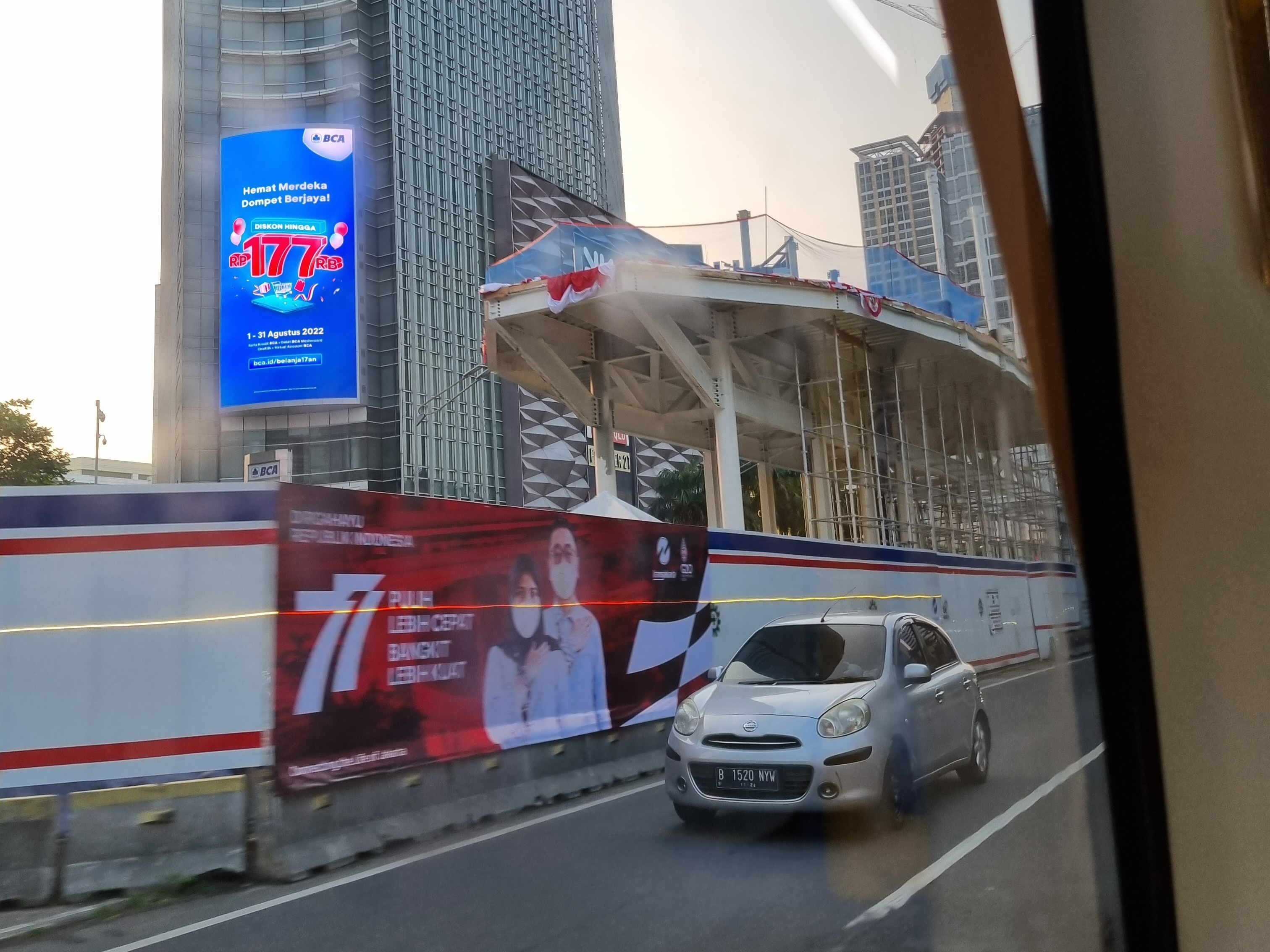
Revitalization progress of the north building, 2022

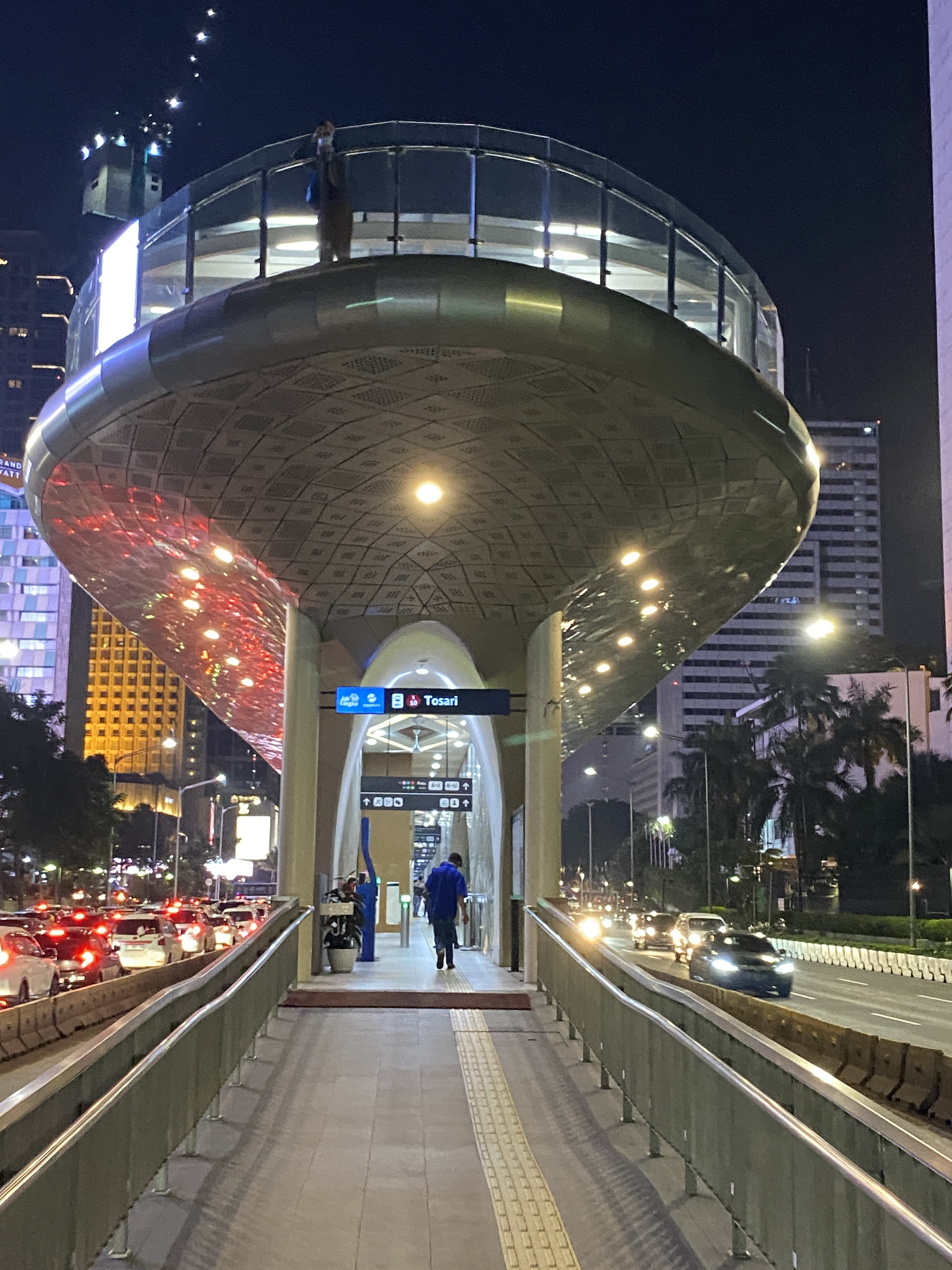
The entrance to the new, redesigned north building, 2023

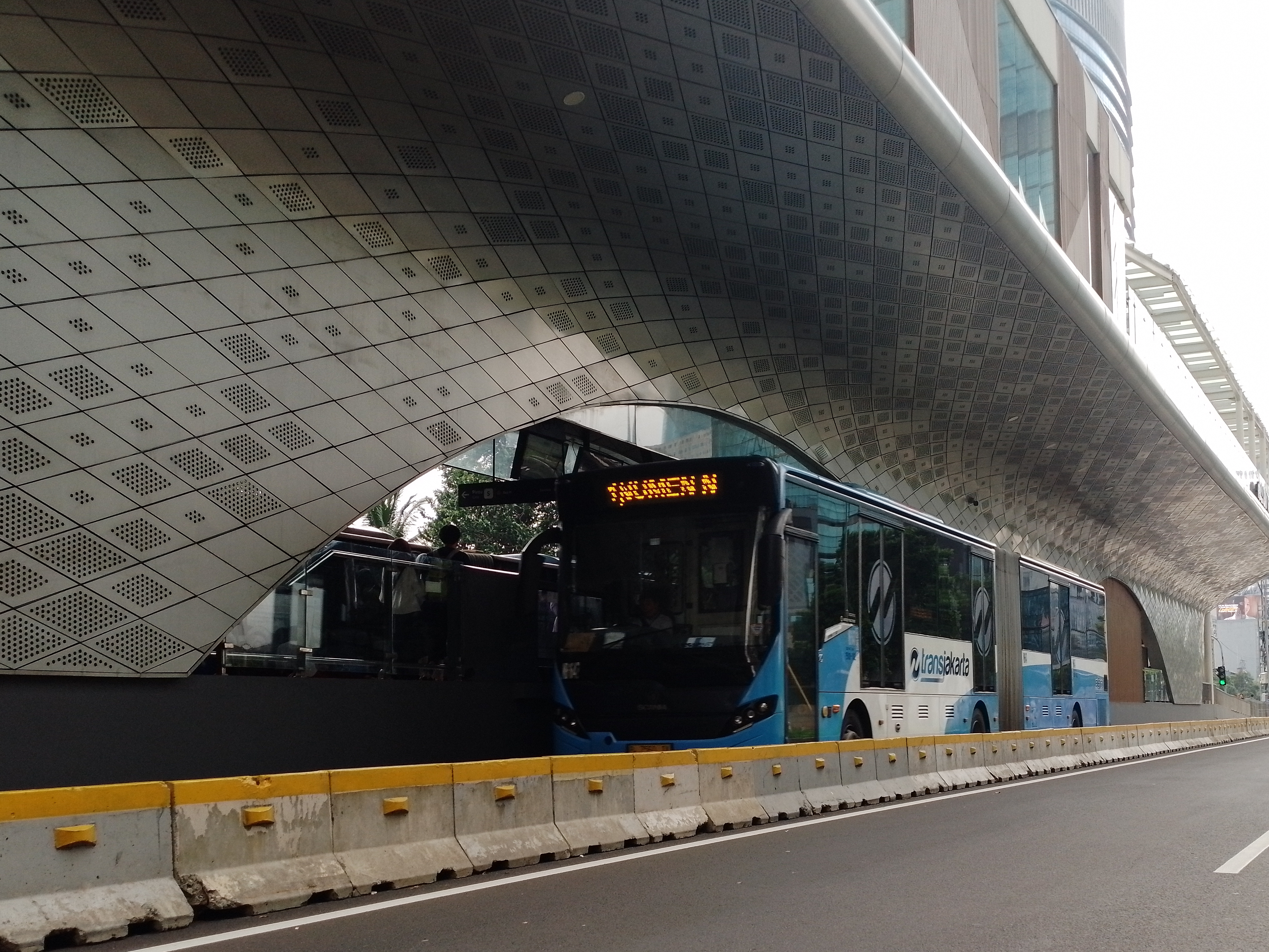
A Transjakarta Scania articulated bus entering Tosari station, 2024

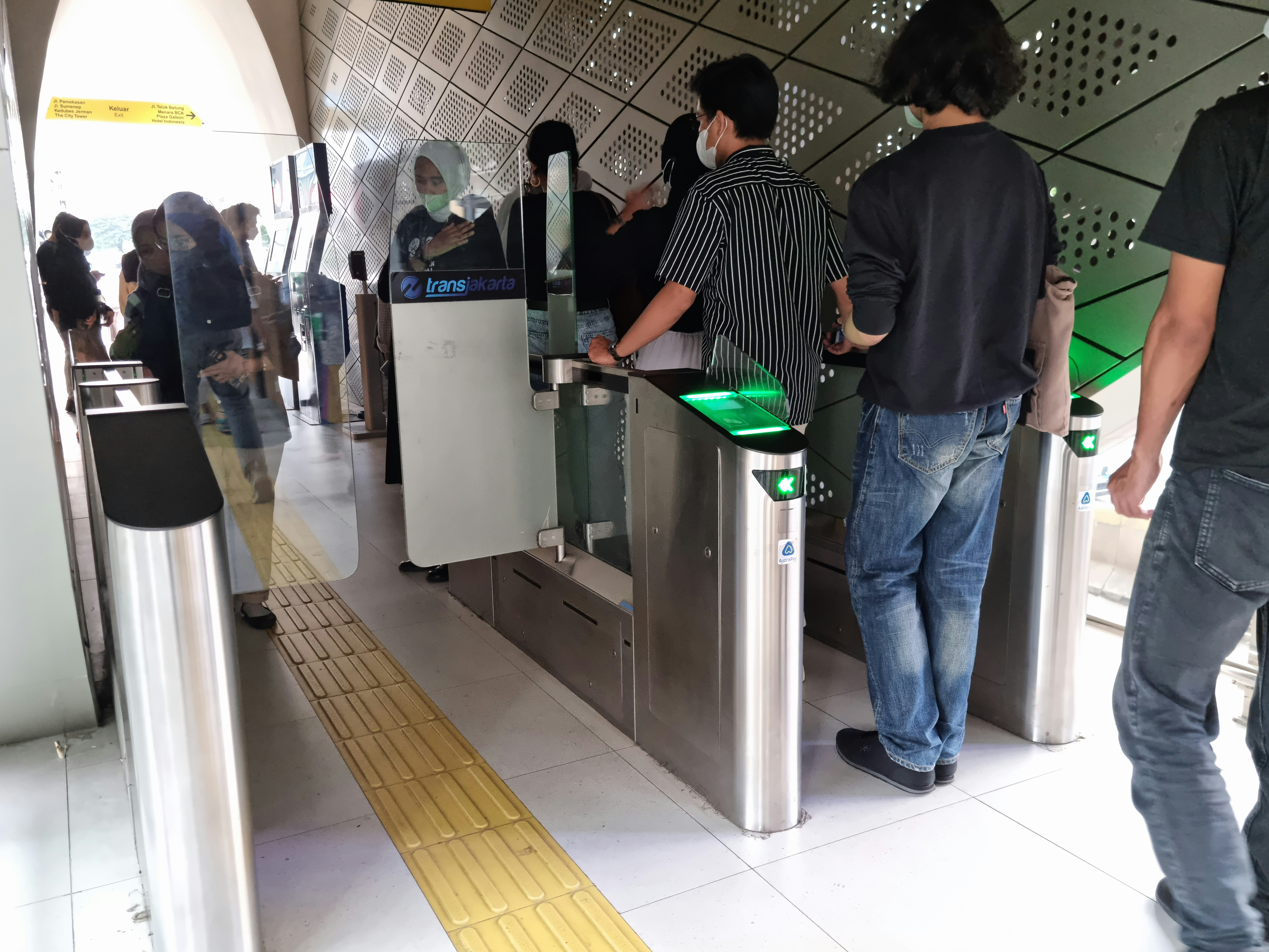
Entrance/exit gates

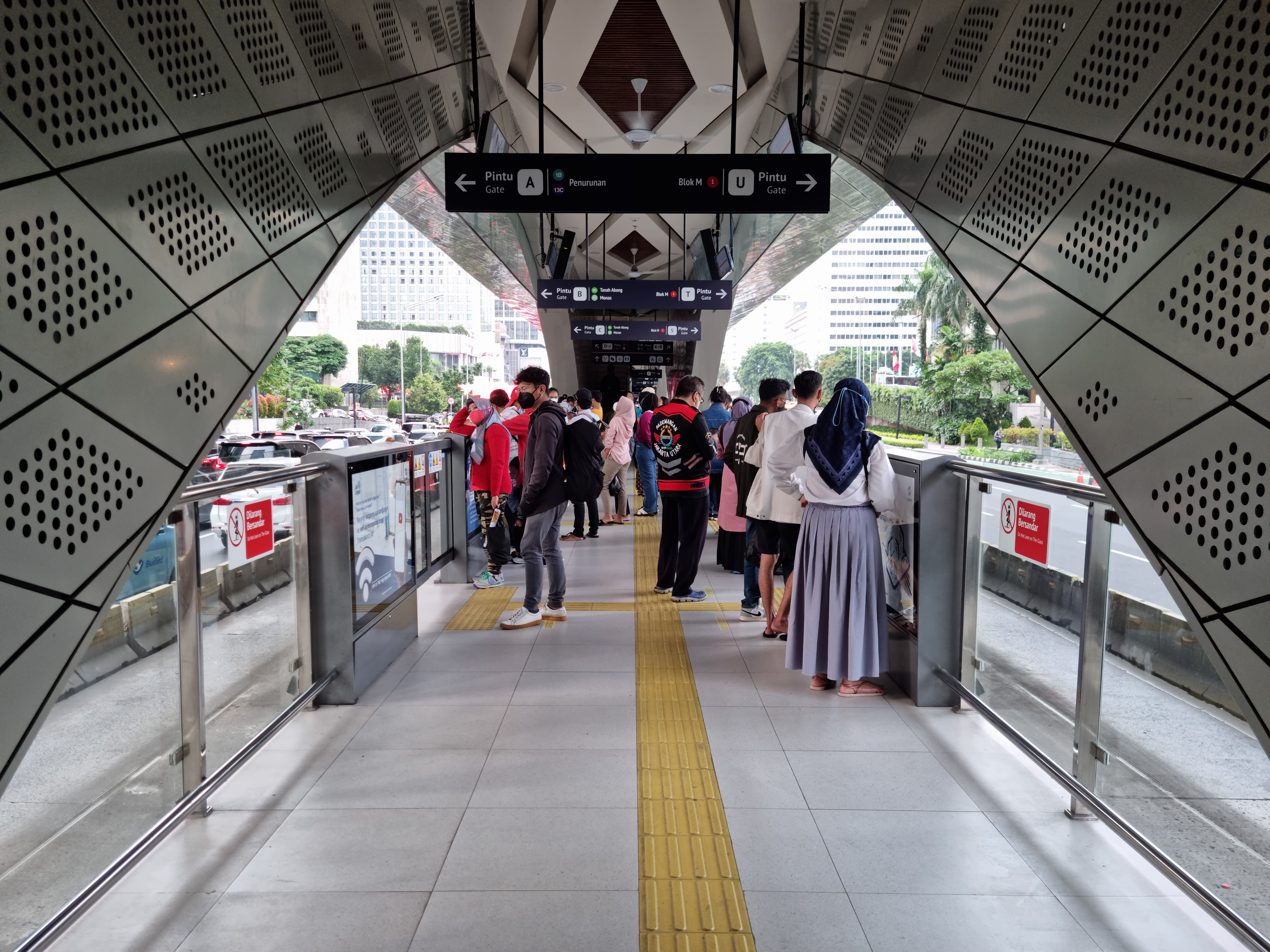
Platform area, 2024

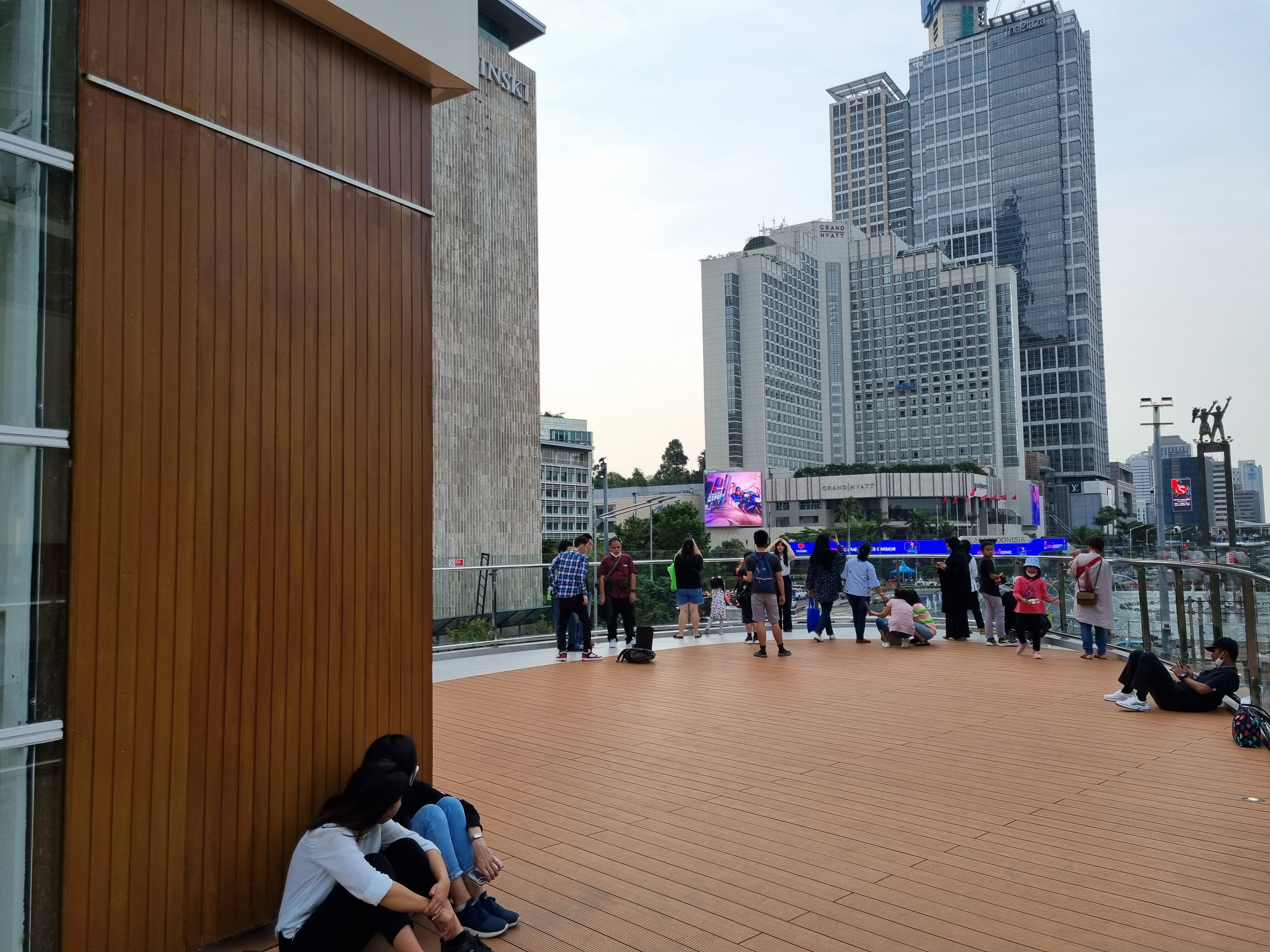
The north viewing deck looking towards the Selamat Datang Monument, 2024

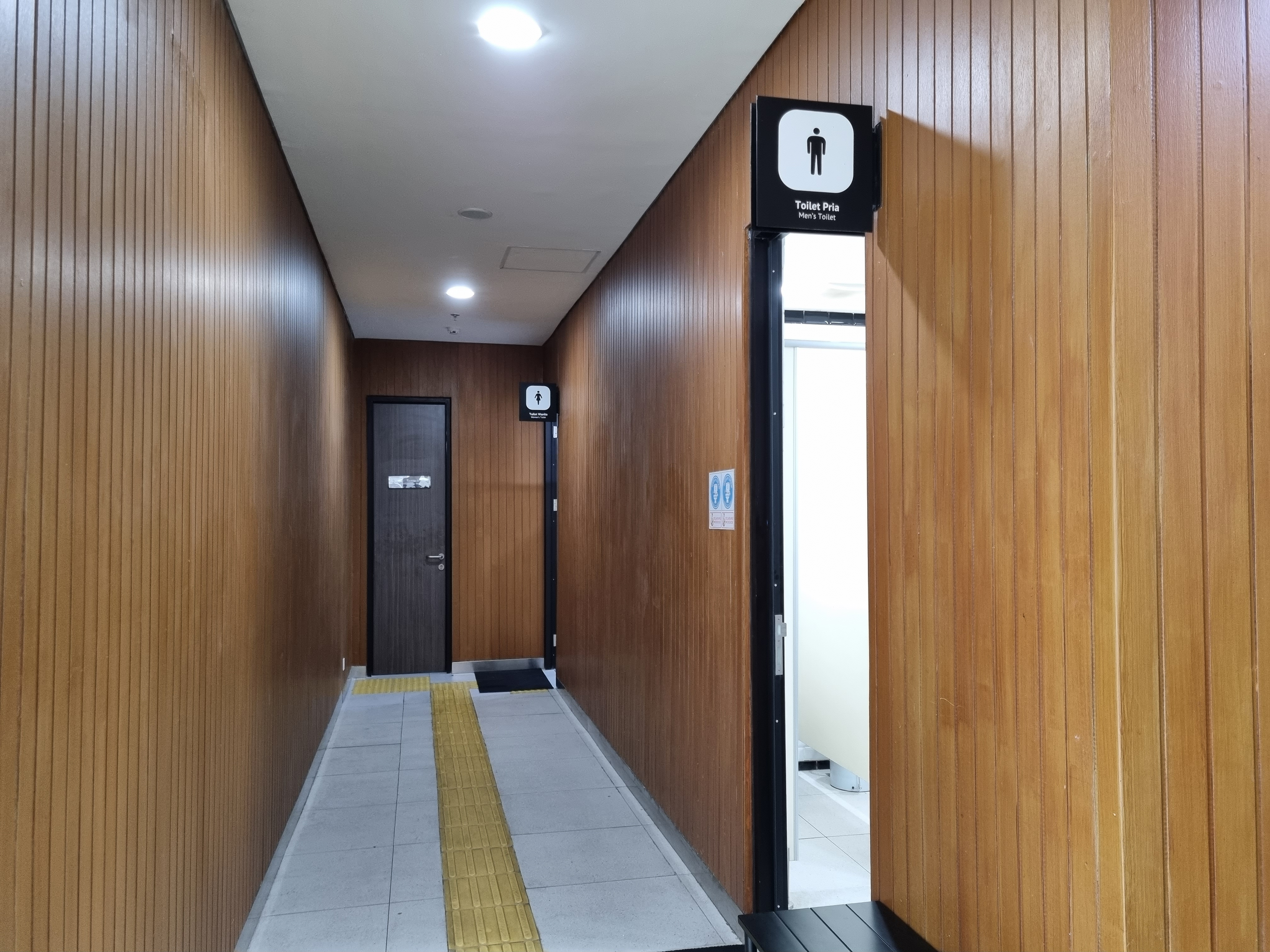
Toilets in the upper floor

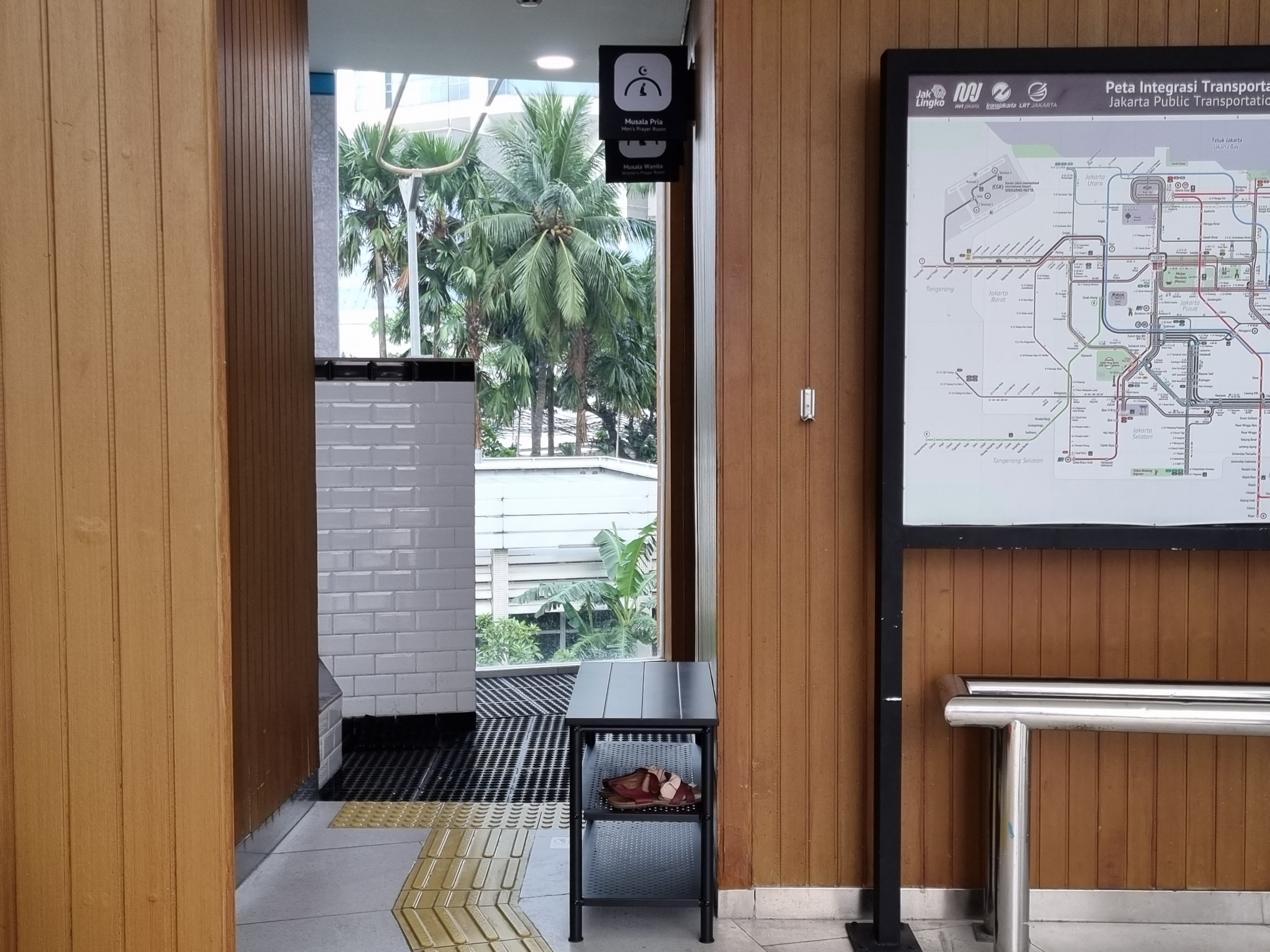
A dedicated room (musala) for Islamic prayers (salat)
