= Sarinah =

Indonesian retail company

PT Sarinah

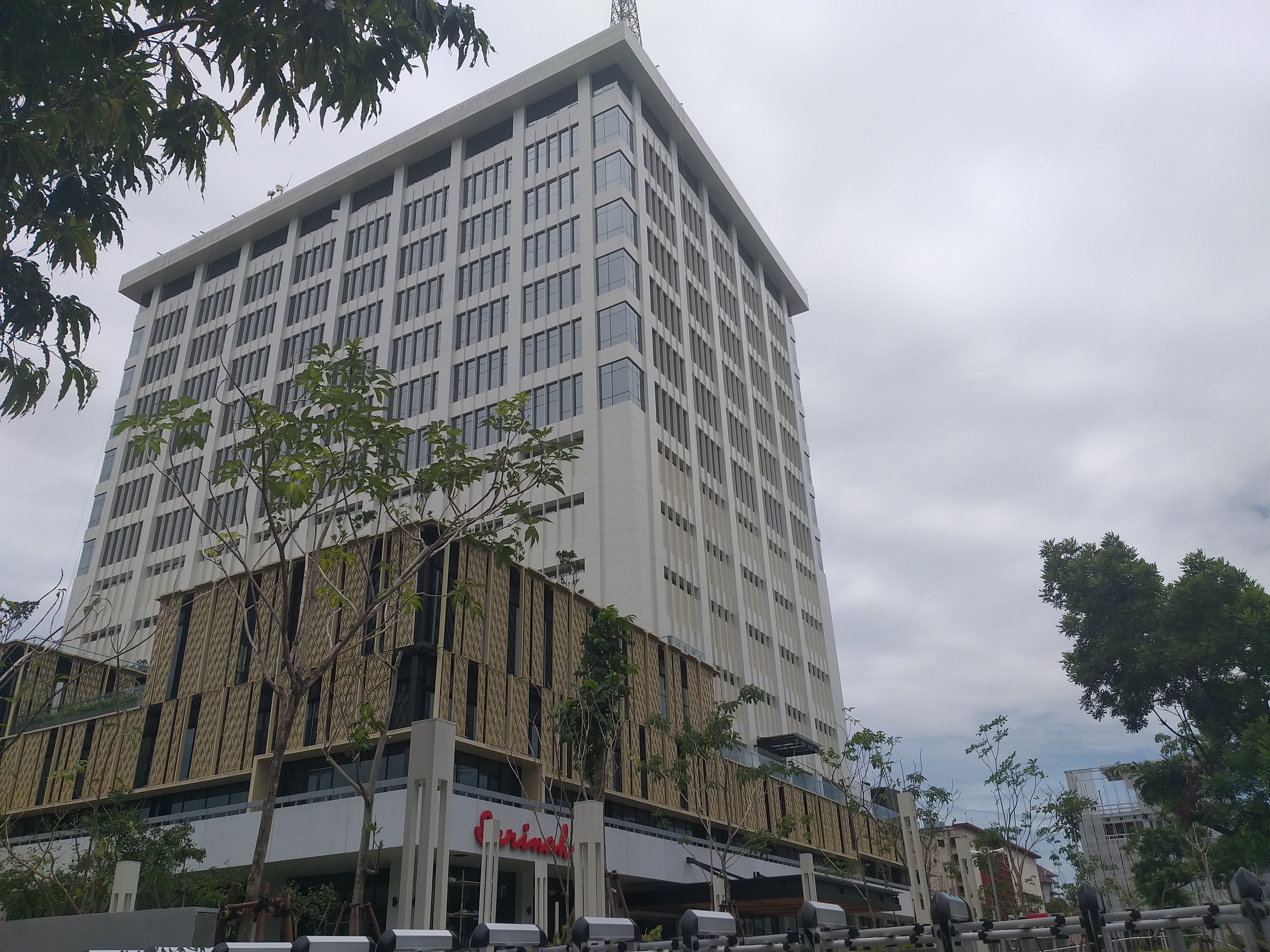
- Sarinah Building, Sarinah's flagship store, in Jakarta after renovation
- Formerly: PT Department Store Indonesia "Sarinah" (Persero) (1966–1979); PT Sarinah (Persero) (1979–2021)
- Type: Subsidiary state-owned enterprise
- Founded: 1962
- Headquarters: Jakarta, Indonesia
- Key people: Sukarno
- Owner: Government of Indonesia
- Parent: PT Aviasi Pariwisata Indonesia (Persero)
- Website: www.sarinah.co.id

PT Sarinah (Persero) is an Indonesian retail company owned by PT Aviasi Pariwisata Indonesia (Persero) (InJourney), a state-owned holding company. Its flagship store, Sarinah Building in M.H. Thamrin Street of Central Jakarta, was the first skyscraper to be built in Jakarta as well as the first modern department store in the city. In addition to Thamrin, Sarinah also has a number of other outlets namely at Pejaten Village in South Jakarta, Banyumanik (Semarang) and Malang.

== History ==
Sarinah was incorporated on 17 August 1962 as PT Department Store Indonesia "Sarinah".

In the early 1960s, Indonesia was hit by very high inflation rates. President Sukarno believed that a department store would act as a price stabilizer to help keep prices under control, citing similar department stores in Communist states used as such price stabilizers (for example, the Soviet GUM, the Czech Bílá labuť, and the Polish CDT). (Note: "Maka demikian pula department store bukan sesuatu barang luxe, tetapi sesuatu barang viral untuk terselenggarakanja sosialisme di Indonesia. Dan bukan di Indonesia sadja, tiap-tiap negara sosialis didunia ini mempunjai department store. Datanglah ke Praha, datanglah di Moskow, datanglah di Warsawa, datanglah di Ulanbator, ada department store Saudara-saudara, sebagai distribusi aparat, sebagai prijs stabilisator.") The first store in Jakarta was built by Obayashi Corporation using Japanese war reparation funds, and opened in August 1966. The project was conceived by President Sukarno, who named it Sarinah after his childhood nanny.

In an effort to pursue its price stabilization agenda, state-owned Sarinah department store published weekly grocery price lists. Sukarno affirmed that "The Sarinah department store will become one of the important tools for the organization of Indonesian socialism..." and "if Sarinah sells a kebaya for 10 rupiah then another retailer will not dare to sell the same kebaya for 20 rupiah". (Note: "Maka department store jang akan didirikan ini menurut anggapan saja adalah satu alat pula dari perdjoangan kita untuk merealisasikan Amanat Penderitaan Rakjat. Merealisasikan satu masjarakat jang adil dan makmur, satu masjarakat sosialis, satu masjarakat tanpa exploitation de l'homme par l'homme. Dan sebagai tadi kukatakan masjarakat jang demikian itu tak mungkin tanpa distribusi aparat. Salah satu distribusi aparat ialah suatu department store. Dan ketjuali itu menurut anggapanku, menurut kejakinan dan menurut penjelidikanku disemua negara jang ada department store, satu department store adalah sat[u] price stabilisator, prijs stabilisator. Kalau kita bisa mendjual satu bahan kebaja di department store dengan harga Rp10,–, diluar orang tidak akan berani mendjual bahan kebaja dengan Rp20,– satu bahan. Kalau kita didalam department store bisa mendjual satu peti alat apapun dengan harga Rp100,–, diluar orang tidak akan berani mendjual barang itu dengan harga Rp500,– atau Rp1000,–. Department store adalah pendjaga harga. Oleh karena itu maka saja perintahkan agar supaja di Djakarta segera didirikan satu department store, dilain-lain kota djuga didirikan satu department store.") However, it failed almost immediately in this role as there was a limit to what one store or even a few stores could do in such a large country. Sarinah struggled to compete with other retailers and went into debt as it expanded aggressively into other cities in Indonesia.

In the early 1970s, in an effort to survive, Sarinah moved its focus to local handicrafts, especially batik. It was renamed into the present name in 1979.

On 6 October 2021, the government of Indonesia handed over the majority of the company shares to PT Aviasi Pariwisata Indonesia (Persero), as an effort to form a state-owned holding company engaged in aviation and tourism.

== Sponsorship ==
In June 2025, Sarinah become the title sponsor of the 2025 Jakarta ePrix of the Formula E electric motorsport championship.

== Cited works ==
- Merrillees, Scott (2015). Jakarta: Portraits of a Capital 1950–1980. Jakarta: Equinox Publishing. ISBN 9786028397308.
- Rimmer, Peter J.; Dick, Howard (2009). The City in Southeast Asia: Patterns, Processes and Policy. Singapore: NUS Press. ISBN 978-9971-69-426-5.
- Shimizu, Hiroshi (2008). Japanese Firms in Contemporary Singapore. Singapore: NUS Press. ISBN 978-9971-69-384-8.
- Sukarno (1963). "Amanat Paduka Jang Mulia Presiden Sukarno pada Pemantjangan Tiang Pertama Gedung Department Store "Sarinah" di Djalan Thamrin, Djakarta, 23 April 1963" [Address from His Majesty President Sukarno at the Groundbreaking of the "Sarinah" Department Store in Djalan Thamrin, Djakarta, 23 April 1963.] (in Indonesian). Jakarta: State Secretariat of the Republic of Indonesia.
