= List of restaurants in Jakarta =

Cafe in Jakarta Old Town.

This is a list of notable restaurants in Jakarta, Indonesia.

== List ==
=== Current ===
- Cafe Batavia
- Gado-Gado Cemara – Restaurant in Central Jakarta known for its Gado-gado and distinctive peanut sauce.
- Ragusa Ice Cream – Ice cream shop in Central Jakarta originally founded by two Italian brothers.
- Trio Restaurant – Restaurant in Central Jakarta known for its Cantonese dishes.

=== Former ===
- Cahaya Kota – Restaurant in Central Jakarta known for its Chinese food, closed down in 2022.
