= Trio Restaurant =

Restaurant in Central Jakarta

- Interactive map of Trio Restaurant

Restaurant information
- Established: 1947
- Food type: Chinese cuisine (Cantonese)
- Location: Jl. RP. Soeroso No. 29A, Gondangdia, Menteng, Central Jakarta, Jakarta, Indonesia
- Coordinates: 6.1921645°S 106.8361127°E

Trio Restaurant (Indonesian: Restoran Trio) is a restaurant serving Chinese cuisine in the Menteng neighborhood of Jakarta, Indonesia. It was founded in 1947, making it one of the oldest restaurants in the city. It is well known for its Cantonese dishes.

== History ==
Trio Restaurant was founded in 1947. Around 1957 or 1958, the restaurant was robbed by six people carrying firearms when it was about to close for the day. A witness ran to a nearby police post, and they were arrested without incident as their gun jammed. One of the perpetrators returned to the restaurant years later, becoming a customer.

== Cuisine ==
The restaurant is well known for its Cantonese dishes. Its menu has around 320 dishes.

== Venue ==
Trio Restaurant is located on Jl. RP. Soeroso in Menteng, Central Jakarta. Its decoration and design has remained unchanged since the 1940s. In a review for the Jakarta Globe, Mark Graham noted that the restaurant has a green security cage in front instead of windows and "giving the unique experience of dining in a prison cell or a giant hamster cage."
