= Wisma Nusantara =

Office skyscraper in Jakarta

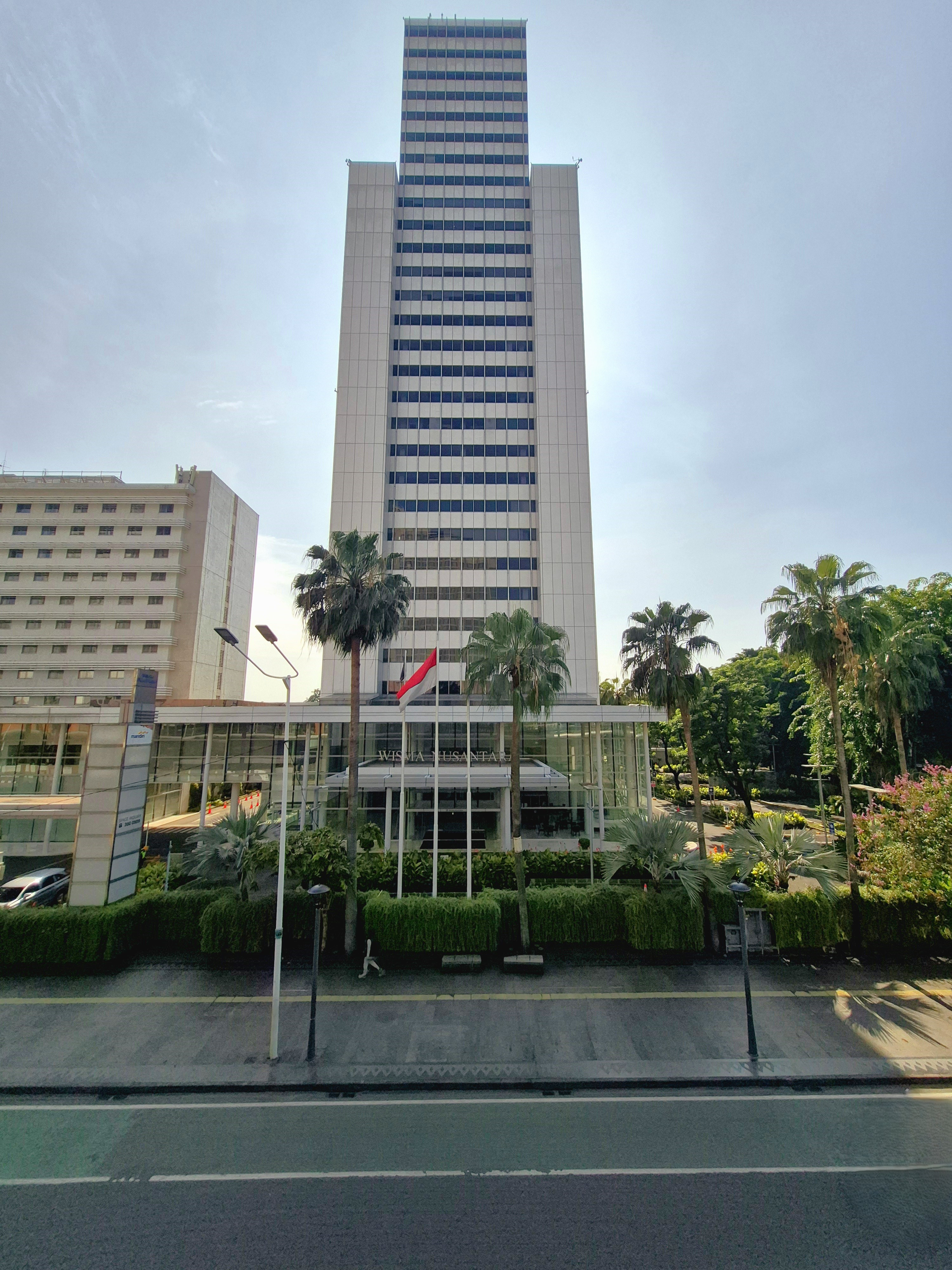
- Wisma Nusantara and the adjacent Hotel Pullman in 2025.

Record height
- Tallest in Indonesia from 1967 to 1983^{[I]}
- Preceded by: Sarinah
- Surpassed by: Graha Mandiri

General information
- Status: Completed
- Type: Office
- Architectural style: International style
- Location: Jakarta, Indonesia, Jl. M.H. Thamrin No. 59, Jakarta 10350
- Coordinates: 6°11′38″S 106°49′25″E
- Construction started: 1964
- Completed: 1967
- Inaugurated: December 2, 1972
- Owner: Pt. Wisma Nusantara International

Height
- Height: 117 m (384 ft)

Technical details
- Floor count: 30
- Floor area: 25,386 m^{2} (273,250 sq ft)
- Lifts/elevators: 4 units for 13th-28th floor, 3 units for 1st-13th floor

Design and construction
- Main contractor: Mitsui Construction Co.

Other information
- Public transit: Bundaran HI Bank Jakarta; Bundaran HI Astra

Wisma Nusantara is a high-rise office skyscraper located in Jalan M.H. Thamrin, Jakarta, Indonesia. Constructed from 1964 to 1969, Wisma Nusantara was amongst the first highrise buildings in Indonesia. The building complex included the Pullman Hotel.

== History ==
The construction of Wisma Nusantara was inspired by President Sukarno's intention to have the first high-rise building in Jakarta. The first contract was awarded in 1964 for $5.7 million using the Japanese war reparation and construction commenced in the same year. However, the decline of the rupiah and the attempted coup d'état interrupted the construction of Wisma Nusantara. As a result, the money ran out, leaving the building unfinished with only its steel frame completed for more than 5 years.

Construction work was continued by Mitsui Construction Co. in 1972 after the renewal of the contract. Wiratman Wangsadinata, the founder of PT. Wiratman & Associates, was chosen as the supervisor of the project in 1970. The building was finally completed in 1972. It was officially inaugurated by President Suharto on December 2, 1972, together with the adjacent President Hotel (now Pullman Hotel). As part of the deal, the share was held by Mitsui 55% and the Indonesian Government 45%. Because of the considerably high cost of renting office space, the building was only used by Japanese companies for a couple of years. Because of this, the building stimulated the antipathy of Indonesian citizens. The building was at one time topped with a large sign of Suzuki. An Indonesian movie directed by Sjumandjaja Budak Nafsu (1984), literally "slave to lust", depicts a scene where a young woman was raped and made a concubine for the Japanese during the war, and having lost her energy for life, wanders around Jakarta surrounded by neon signs of Japanese enterprises on Jalan M.H. Thamrin, which clearly shows sentiment toward the Japanese in Indonesia during the period.

The first major renovation was done in 1990 which consist of JICA building construction. The connecting bridge between Wisma Nusantara office building and the hotel (then known as Nikko Hotel) was built in 2002. In 2003, Nikko Hotel was expanded with an additional 11-story executive suite tower to the north of the Wisma Nusantara complex. This hotel tower was designed by Kenzo Tange International. In 2005, the Annex Building was completed to accommodate parking.

== Design ==
Wisma Nusantara in 2010

Wisma Nusantara was constructed with a steel frame and a caisson foundation for resistance to earthquakes.

== Cited works ==
- Merrillees, Scott (2015). Jakarta: Portraits of a Capital 1950-1980. Jakarta: Equinox Publishing. ISBN 9786028397308.
- Miyake, Yoshimi (2006). "Political and cultural aspects of Japanese war compensation to Indonesia" (PDF). Meiji Gakuin Daigaku Gengo Bunka Kenkyu 23.
