= Mandarin Oriental, Jakarta =

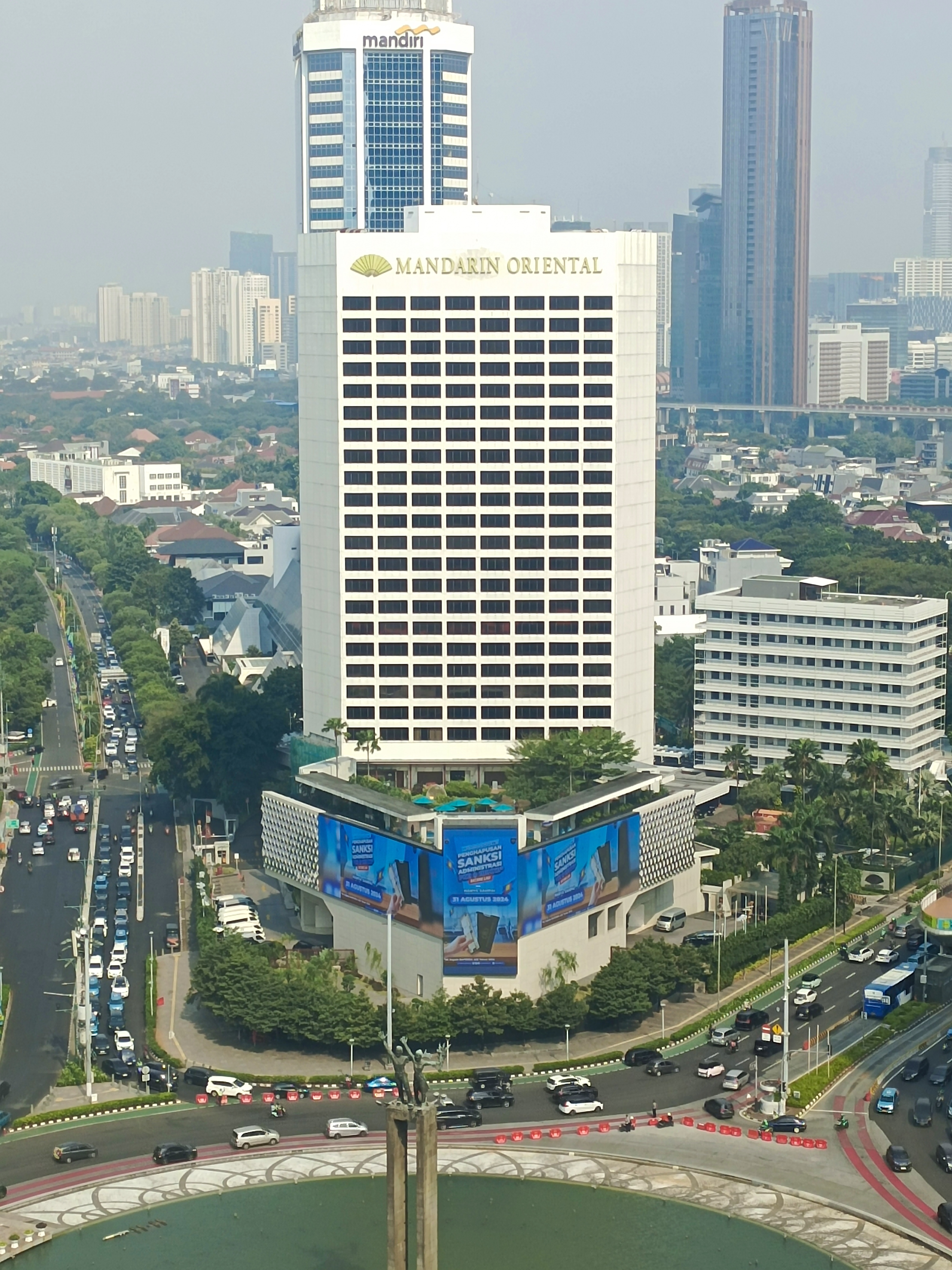
- View of the hotel from the northwest.
- Interactive map of the Mandarin Oriental, Jakarta area

General information
- Location: Jakarta, Indonesia, Jl. M.H. Thamrin, Menteng, Menteng, Central Jakarta
- Coordinates: 6.19604°S 106.82358°E
- Opened: September 1978; 47 years ago
- Owner: Astra International
- Landlord: Mandarin Oriental Hotel Group

Technical details
- Floor count: 25

Design and construction
- Architects: Arkonin; Palmer & Turner; Lim, Teo, and Wilkes (2009)
- Developer: Jaya Construction

Other information
- Number of rooms: 272
- Number of restaurants: 6

Website
- www.mandarinoriental.com/en/jakarta/jalan-mh-thamrin

Mandarin Oriental, Jakarta is a luxury hotel located in Menteng, Jakarta. Situated near the Selamat Datang Monument, it is one of the four hotels that surround this landmark, along with Hotel Indonesia, Grand Hyatt Jakarta, and Pullman Jakarta Indonesia Thamrin CBD. The hotel was established in 1978 through a joint venture between three Indonesian and Hong Kong companies, including Jardine Matheson, the parent company of the Mandarin Oriental Hotel Group, which continues to manage the hotel to this day. Since 2023, Mandarin Oriental's full ownership has been held by Astra International, another subsidiary of Jardine Matheson.

== History ==
In April 1974, Mandarin International Hotels Limited, a subsidiary of Jardine Matheson that managed The Mandarin Hong Kong hotel, announced that it intended to open a branch in Indonesia at a press conference held at Hotel Borobudur. The hotel was funded by PT Jaya Mandarin Agung, a joint venture between Jardine Matheson and its subsidiary, Hongkong Land, together with Jaya Bali Agung.

Construction of the hotel began in January 1976 and was completed within three years. The cost of building the hotel amounted to Rp25 billion. The Mandarin Jakarta welcomed its first guests in September 1978, before being officially inaugurated on 23 September 1979 at a ceremony attended by Nelly Adam Malik. In 1987, following The Mandarin Hong Kong’s acquisition of The Oriental Bangkok, all hotels under “The Mandarin” brand were renamed to the Mandarin Oriental Hotel Group. The Mandarin Jakarta was subsequently renamed Mandarin Oriental, Jakarta.

Mandarin Oriental, Jakarta was closed on 23 December 2007 for renovation purposes. The renovation, which involved an interior refurbishment, was overseen by an architectural team from Lim, Teo, and Wilkes. The renovation was completed in September 2009, and the hotel reopened on 8 October 2009.

On 5 July 2023, Astra International acquired Mandarin Oriental, Jakarta in a transaction worth Rp1.28 trillion. There was no change regarding Jardine Matheson’s ownership of the hotel, since it holds a majority stake in Astra International.

== Architecture ==
The Mandarin Oriental, Jakarta building was designed in the International Style. Its interior design was inspired by Nias and Batak Tapanuli elements combined with Western influences. In 2023, the hotel installed a three-dimensional LED advertising screen on the front podium. According to PT Vista Asta Persada, the installer, this made Mandarin Oriental, Jakarta, the third hotel in the world to feature a three-dimensional LED.

== Facilities ==
Mandarin Oriental, Jakarta occupies a 25-story building and has a room capacity of 272. The rooms are divided into several types, ranging from Deluxe Rooms to the Mandarin Suite. The hotel also offers facilities including six dining venues (Azure, Cinnamon, Li Feng, Lyon, MO Bar, The Mandarin Cake Shop), a swimming pool, a fitness center, a spa, and meeting rooms.
