= Pullman Jakarta Indonesia Thamrin CBD =

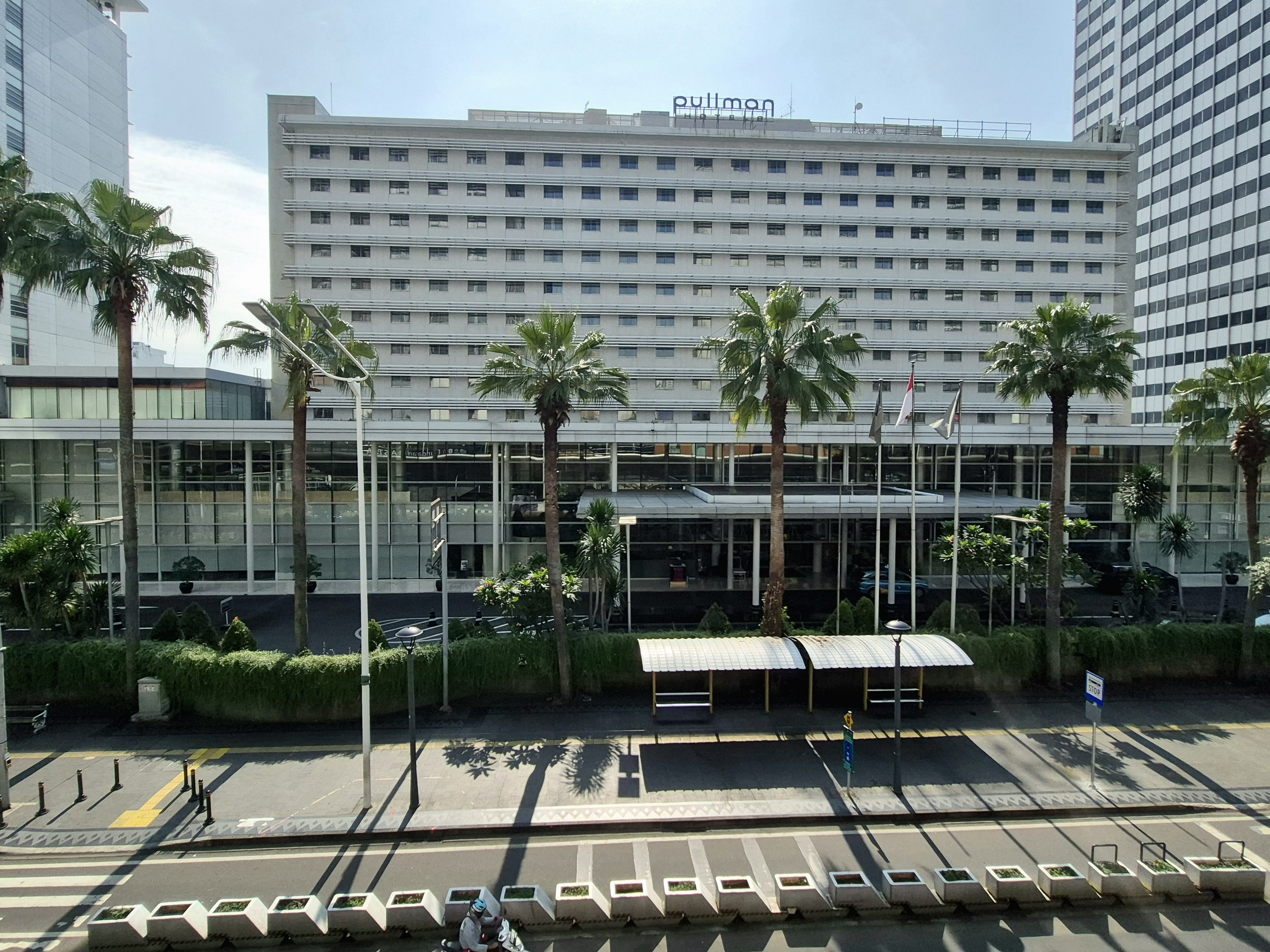
- View of the Main Wing of the hotel in 2025
- Interactive map of the Pullman Jakarta Indonesia Thamrin CBD area
- Hotel chain: Pullman Hotels and Resorts

General information
- Location: Jakarta, Indonesia, Jl. M.H. Thamrin No.59, Gondangdia, Menteng, Central Jakarta
- Coordinates: 6.19324°S 106.82367°E
- Opened: 2 December 1972; 53 years ago
- Owner: Guthrie GTS (76%); Mitsui (24%)
- Landlord: Accor

Technical details
- Floor count: 11 (Main Tower); 14 (Pullman Tower)

Design and construction
- Architects: Kajima; Kenzo Tange & Associates (2003)
- Developer: Taisei Corporation; Kajima; PP Construction & Investment; Total Bangun Persada (2003)

Other information
- Number of rooms: 427
- Number of restaurants: 4

Website
- www.pullmanjakartaindonesia.com

Pullman Jakarta Indonesia Thamrin CBD is a five-star hotel located on Jalan M.H. Thamrin, Jakarta. It is one of four hotels surrounding the Selamat Datang Monument. It was opened in 1972 as part of the Wisma Nusantara complex, a skyscraper that once held the record for the tallest building in Indonesia until 1983. Initially managed by Nikko Hotels, the hotel has been operated by Accor under the Pullman brand since 2012. It is owned by PT Wisma Nusantara International, the majority of whose shares are owned by a Singaporean company, Guthrie GTS.

== History ==
The construction of this hotel is closely tied to Wisma Nusantara, a skyscraper whose design was initiated by President Sukarno in 1964. Due to the hyperinflation that struck Indonesia at the time, the construction was halted until 1969, when the Indonesian government under President Suharto secured cooperation with Mitsui to resume building the 30-story tower. The project was then expanded to include a star-rated hotel intended for Japanese businessmen staying in Jakarta.

With Kajima, Taisei Corporation, and Total Bangun Persada as contractors and a budget of Rp11.5 billion, construction began in April 1970 and was completed in November 1972. Suharto and Jakarta Governor Ali Sadikin inaugurated the President Hotel on 2 December 1972. Its management was entrusted to Japan Airlines Development, Ltd., a subsidiary of Japan Airlines, which would later be rename Nikko Hotels . The Indonesian government held a 55% stake in the hotel, while Mitsui and Japan Airlines held 40% and 5%, respectively.

On 14 May 1986, the President Hotel was attacked by the left-wing militant group Japanese Red Army. The militants also targeted the United States and Japan embassies in Jakarta. There were no casualties as the bombs planted failed to detonate. The mastermind behind the attack, Tsutomu Shirosaki, was eventually captured by the United States and sentenced to 30 years in prison in 1998.

The President Hotel was renovated between July 1987 and July 1991 to refurbish guest rooms, restaurants, and the convention hall. This also reduced the number of rooms from 354 to 315. The renovation was inaugurated on 26 July 1991, by Vice President Soedharmono. In October 1992, Indocement acquired a 31% stake in the hotel. After the fall of the New Order regime, both the Indonesian government and Indocement sold their shares to Guthrie GTS, a Singapore-based property company, while Mitsui retained a minority stake in PT Wisma Nusantara International.

In March 2003, the President Hotel inaugurated a 14-story extension located to the north of the original building, constructed by PP Taisei and Total Bangun Persada, and designed by Kenzo Tange & Associates. The new building increased the room capacity to 427. At the same time, the name was changed to Hotel Nikko Jakarta.

On 19 January 2012, after nearly 30 years, the hotel ended its partnership with Nikko Hotels. Accor was invited to manage the hotel under the Pullman Hotels and Resorts brand, and the hotel was subsequently renamed Pullman Jakarta Indonesia Thamrin CBD. The hotel underwent another renovation by Singapore-based architecture firm Wilson & Associates, which was completed on 13 February 2014.

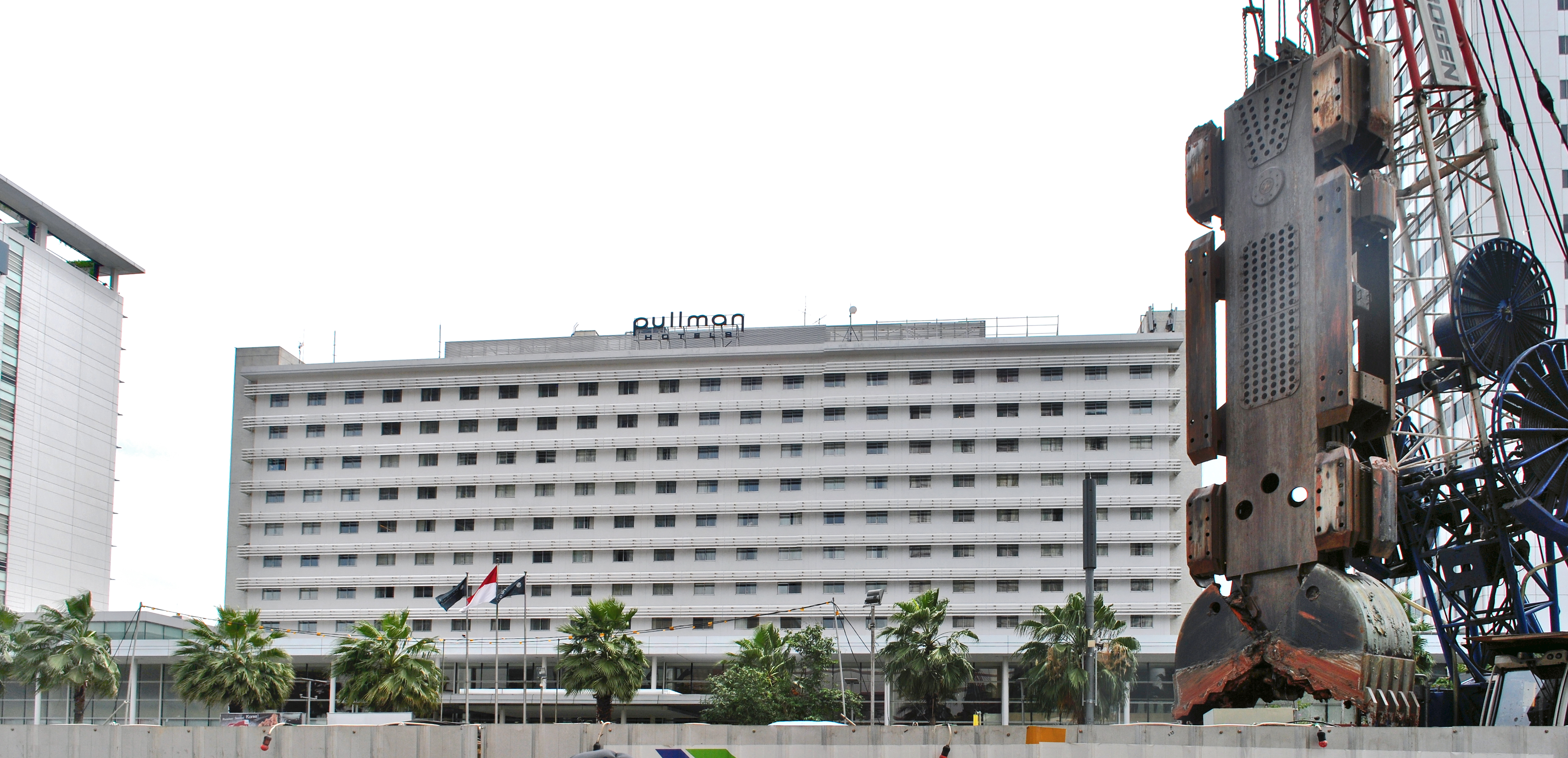
View of the hotel's main wing in 2025

== Facilities ==
Pullman Jakarta Indonesia Thamrin CBD has a total of 427 rooms of various types, ranging from Superior to Accent Suite. These are spread across two buildings: the Main Tower (the original building from 1972) and the Pullman Tower (the 2003 extension). All Grand Deluxe and Executive rooms are located in the Pullman Tower. The hotel also offers 4 dining venues (Kahyangan Restaurant, Le Chocolat, Sana Sini Restaurant, The Back Room), a swimming pool, fitness center, spa, and 19 meeting rooms.
