= Obayashi Corporation =

Japanese construction company

- Formerly: Ohbayashi
- Type: Public (K.K)
- Traded as: TYO: 1802; Nikkei 225 Component
- Industry: Construction; Engineering; Design
- Founded: Osaka, Osaka Prefecture, Japan (January 1892)
- Founder: Yoshigoro Obayashi
- Headquarters: Shinagawa Intercity Tower B, 2-15-2, Kōnan, Minato-ku, Tokyo 108-8502, Japan
- Area served: Worldwide
- Key people: Kenji Hasuwa, (CEO and President)
- Services: Architectural design; Civil engineering design; Construction (civil engineering and building construction); Engineering; Real estate
- Revenue: ▲$ 17.28 billion USD (FY 2018.3) (¥ 1,901 billion JPY) (FY 2018.3)
- Net income: ▲$ 1.25 billion USD (FY 2018.3) (¥ 137.8 billion JPY) (FY 2018.3)
- Number of employees: 14,359 (consolidated) (as of March 31, 2018)
- Website: Official website

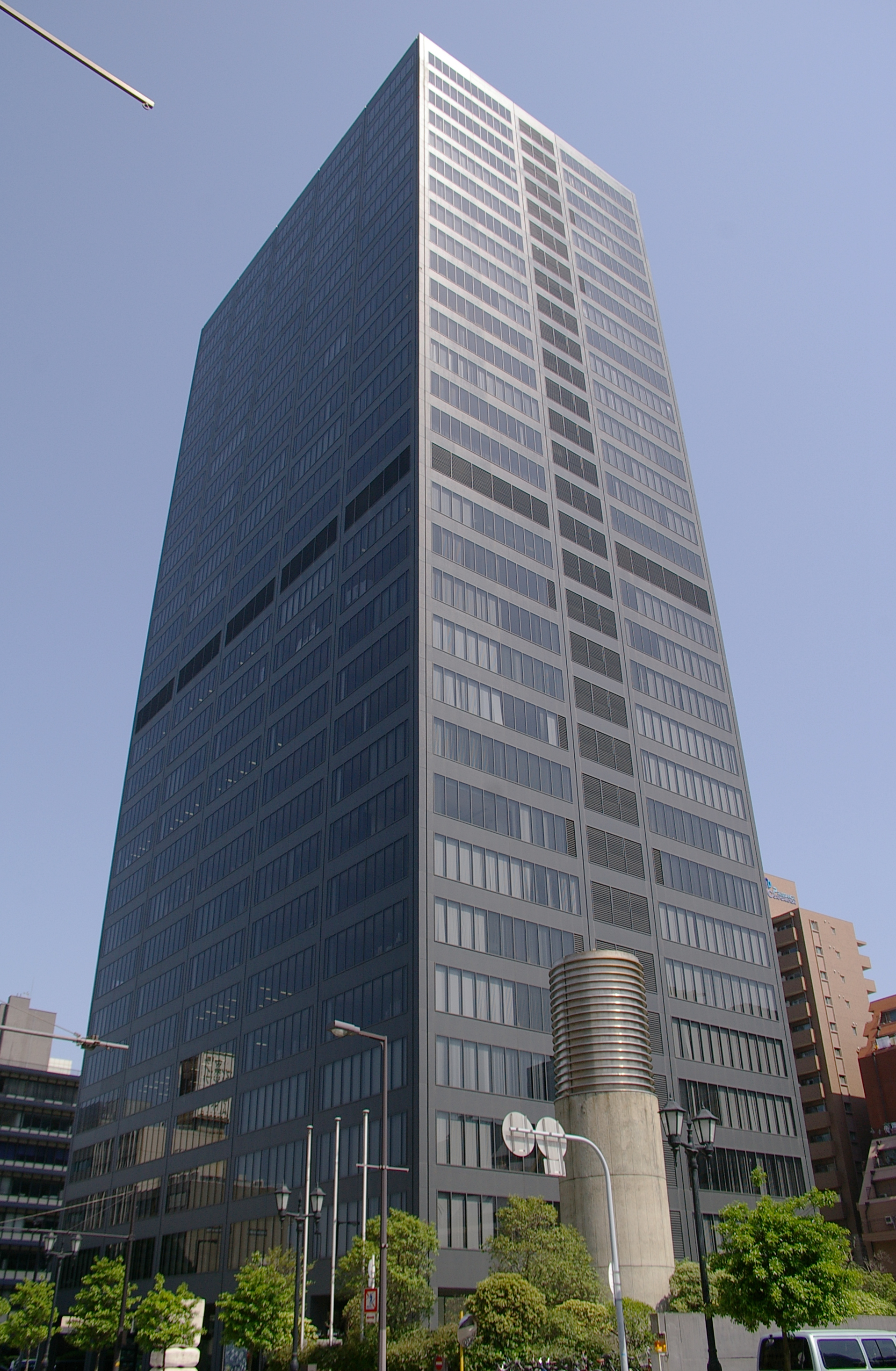
Osaka Obayashi Building, registered headquarters of Obayashi Corp. in Chuo-ku, Osaka, Japan

Obayashi Corporation (株式会社大林組, Kabushiki-gaisha Ōbayashi Gumi) is one of five major Japanese construction companies along with Shimizu Corporation, Takenaka Corporation, Kajima Corporation, and Taisei Corporation. It is listed on the Tokyo Stock Exchange and is one of the Nikkei 225 corporations. Its headquarters are in Minato, Tokyo. In 2018, Obayashi was ranked 15th place on ENR's list of Top 250 Global Contractors, the highest among Japanese Contractors.

Established in 1892 in Osaka, the company operates in Japan and other countries, especially Southeast Asia and Australia, as well as the United States and Europe. Major landmarks it has constructed in Japan include the Kyoto Station Building, the Tokyo Broadcasting System (TBS) Center in Tokyo, as well as the Tokyo Skytree.

Obayashi has 86 subsidiaries and 26 affiliated companies in Japan, Europe, the Middle East, Asia, Australia and North America.

In February 2012, the company announced plans to build a space elevator by 2050.

== Corporate timeline ==
- 1892: Obayashi, a Building Construction and Civil Engineering Construction Contractor founded by Yoshigoro Obayashi in Osaka
- 1936: Obayashi Corporation (OC) established
- 1965: Obayashi Corporation (Singapore) established
- 1969: Surfrider Hotel, HI completed
- 1970: Princess Kaiulani Hotel, HI completed
- 1972: Obayashi America Corporation (OAC) established in Los Angeles

PT. Jaya Obayashi established in Indonesia as a joint venture with PT. Pembangunan Jaya.

- 1975: Hotel Kyoto Inn San Francisco, CA completed
- 1978: James E. Roberts - Obayashi Corporation (RO) joins the Obayashi Group
- 1981: Obayashi Corporation San Francisco Office established (Civil Engineering Construction)
- 1982: Obayashi Corporation opens office in New York
- 1988: Toyota Manufacturing Facility, KY completed
- 1989: E.W. Howell Co., Inc. (EWH) joins the Obayashi Group
- 1991: NEC Roseville Semiconductor Plant Mega-Line, CA completed
- 1991: Delta Center/Utah Jazz Arena, UT completed
- 1993: OC America Construction Inc. (OCAC) established in Los Angeles
- 1994: OC Real Estate Management, LLC (OCREM) organized in Los Angeles
- 1997: Sumitomo Sitix of Phoenix, AZ completed
- 1997: Matsushita Semiconductor (MASCA), WA completed
- 1998: Komatsu Silicon America, OR completed
- 1998: San Bernardino (Arrowhead) Medical Center, CA completed
- 2001: Applied Materials (AMAT), CA completed
- 2002: Obayashi USA, LLC (OUSA) established in Los Angeles
- 2002: Obayashi Construction, Inc. (OCI) established in Los Angeles
- 2003: Cedars-Sinai Medical Center Central Plant, CA completed
- 2003: Interstate Distributors, CA completed
- 2005: John S. Clark Company, LLC (JSC) joins the Obayashi Group
- 2007: Webcor, LP joins the Obayashi Group
- 2011: Kenaidan Contracting, Ltd joins the Obayashi Group

== Notable Constructions ==
=== Asia ===
Indonesia

- Sarinah Building

Japan

- Kansai International Airport
- Koshien Stadium
- Tokyo Bay Aqua-Line
- Oasis 21
- Kyoto Station
- TBS
- Osaka Dome
- Namba Parks
- Osaka WTC Building
- Shinjuku Takashimaya Times Square
- Marunouchi Building
- Roppongi Hills Mori Tower
- Tokyo Skytree
- Toranomon Hills

Singapore

- Jewel Changi Airport
- DUO
- One Raffles Quay
- Ocean Financial Centre
- Singapore MRT (North South line, East West line, North East line and Cross Island line)
- Singapore Management University
- Esplanade Bridge
- Plaza Singapura
- Funan Mall
- AXA Tower
- SIA Building
- Mandai Bird Paradise

Taiwan

- Taiwan HSR
- Taipei Metro (Tamsui Line)
- Taipei Dome

Vietnam

- Thủ Thiêm Tunnel

Thailand

- Bangkok MRT Blue Line

United Arab Emirates

- Dubai Metro

=== Oceania ===
Australia

- Stadium Australia

=== North America ===
United States

- Mike O'Callaghan – Pat Tillman Memorial Bridge, also known as the Hoover Dam Bypass
- Los Angeles Metro Red Line (now B Line) - 7th and Flower streets to Wilshire and Alvarado boulevards

== See also ==
- Aeropolis 2001
