= Peter J. Rimmer =

Geographer

Peter J. Rimmer AM is an English-born economic and human geographer concerned with urban and regional development within the Asian-Pacific Rim with a particular emphasis on the role of communications, transport (road, rail, sea, air) and logistics.

== Early life and education ==
Born 29 October 1935 in Ellesmere Port, Cheshire, England, Rimmer was educated at William Stockton County Primary School (1939–47) and, on a scholarship, the King's School, Chester (1947–54). Supported by a State Scholarship, University Graduate Scholarship and a Ministry of Education award, he graduated in Geography from University of Manchester (BA, 1958, MA, 1960) and matriculated from Trinity Hall, Cambridge University (Graduate Certificate of Education, 1959). In 1961 he was awarded a Commonwealth Scholarship and left England to study at University of Canterbury, New Zealand, where he was awarded a PhD (1966) for a dissertation on the country’s seaports. In 2006 Rimmer was awarded the degree of Doctor of Letters by examination at the Australian National University.

== Career ==
Rimmer was a schoolmaster at the Oldershaw Grammar School, Wallasey (1960–62), and Labour councillor for the Victoria Ward, Ellesmere Port Municipal Borough Council. In 1965, he moved to Australia to take up an appointment to teach Geography at Monash University, Melbourne (1965–67). From 1967–2000 he was based in the Department of Geography/Human Geography in the then Research School of Pacific (and Asian) Studies, Australian National University. He was appointed Distinguished Professor of Global Logistics in the Inha University Graduate School of Logistics, Incheon, Korea (2005–07). Rimmer was Adjunct Professor, University of Canberra (Urban & Logistics) from 2003–2013.

Rimmer served as editorial advisor for several journals including Australian Geographical Studies, Journal of Sustainable Transport, Journal of International Logistics and Trade, Journal of Transport Geography and Asia-Pacific Viewpoint. He has been a consultant to international aid agencies, notably the Asian Development Bank and the World Bank.

=== Honours ===
Rimmer was elected a Fellow of the Academy of the Social Sciences in Australia in 1992; received a Professional Service Commendation from the Institute of Australian Geographers in 2000 and in 2018 was conferred a Life Membership of the Institute of Australian Geographers. Rimmer was appointed a Member of the Order of Australia "for service to economic geography, and to the urban and regional development in the Asia-Pacific Rim, particularly through research into the area of transport and communications systems". In 2022, he was awarded the J.P. Thomson Medal by the Royal Geographical Society of Queensland.

A bequest by former PhD student, the late Associate Professor Lisa Drummond, led to the Peter J. Rimmer Prize being instituted at the Australian National University in 2023.

== Published works (recent) ==
- Peter J. Rimmer, "Eurasia’s Geopolitics: China’s Emergence as the Supercontinent’s Pacemaker" in Z. Cope (ed.) The Palgrave Handbook of Contemporary Geopolitics, Cham: Palgrave Macmillan, 2024. https://doi.org/qo.1007/978-3-031-25399-7_27-1
- Peter J. Rimmer and Howard W. Dick, "Shrinking the Pacific since 1945: Containerships, Jets and Interneetet", in Anne Perez Hattori and Jane Samson (eds). The Cambridge History of the Pacific Ocean, Volume II: The Pacific Ocean since 1900. Cambridge: Cambridge University Press, 2023, pp. 634–663.
- Peter J. Rimmer and Booi Hon Kam, Configured by Consumption: How Consumption-Demand Will Reshape Supply Chain Operations, Cheltenham, UK: Edward Elgar Publishing, 2022.
- Peter J. Rimmer, China's Global Vision and Actions: Reactions to Belt, Road and Beyond, Cheltenham, UK: Edward Elgar Publishing, 2020.
- P. J. Rimmer, "Aviation and the COVID-19 Pandemic: Flying to the ‘Next Normal'", Journal of International Trade, Logistics and Law, Vol. 6 (2), 2020, pp. 110–136.
- P. J. Rimmer and H.W. Dick, "Gateways, Corridors and Peripheries" in Rita Padawangi ed., Routledge Handbook on Urbanization in Southeast Asia London and New York: Routledge, 2019, pp. 9–30.
- H.W. Dick and P. J. Rimmer, "Primate Cities" in A.M. Orum ed., The Wiley Blackwell Encyclopedia of Urban and Regional Studies, Chichester: John Wiley & Sons, 2019. doi:10.1002/9781118568446.eurs0247
- Peter J. Rimmer and Booi Hon Kam, Consumer Logistics: Surfing the Digital Wave, Cheltenham, UK; Northampton, MA: Edward Elgar Publishing, 2018.
- Peter J. Rimmer, Asian-Pacific Rim Logistics: Global Context and Local Policies, Cheltenham, UK: Edward Elgar Publishing, 2014.
- Peter J. Rimmer and H. W. Dick, The City in Southeast Asia: Patterns, Processes, and Policy, Singapore: NUS Press, c2009.
- H. W. Dick and Peter J. Rimmer, Cities, Transport & Communications: The Integration of Southeast Asia since 1850, New York: Palgrave Macmillan, 2003.
- Peter J. Rimmer ed., Pacific Rim Development: Integration and Globalisation in East Asia, Sydney: Allen & Unwin, 1997.
- John Black and Peter J. Rimmer, Sydney's Transport: Contemporary Issues, 1988–1992, Sydney: New South Wales Parliamentary Library, 1992.
- Peter J. Rimmer and Lisa M. Allen eds., The Underside of Malaysian History: Pullers, Prostitutes, Plantation Workers, Singapore, University Press for Malaysia Society of the Asian Studies Association of Australia, c1990.
- Peter J. Rimmer, Rikisha to Rapid Transit: Urban Public Transport Systems and Policy in Southeast Asia, Sydney: Pergamon Press, c1986.
