= Gondangdia, Menteng =

Gondangdia
- Administrative village
- Interactive map of Gondangdia
- Coordinates: 6°12′S 106°50′E
- Country: Indonesia
- Province: DKI Jakarta
- Administrative city: Central Jakarta
- District: Menteng
- Postal code: 10350

Gondangdia is an administrative village in the Menteng district of Jakarta, Indonesia. It has a postal code of 10350.

== See also ==
- Menteng
- List of administrative villages of Jakarta
