= Capital of Indonesia =

Old National capital in Indonesia

National Monument, the symbol of independence, at the center of Merdeka Square, Jakarta

The capital of Indonesia, officially the capital of the Unitary State of the Republic of Indonesia (Indonesian: Ibukota Negara Kesatuan Republik Indonesia), is Jakarta, one of the oldest continuously inhabited cities in Southeast Asia. Jakarta, previously known as Batavia, was the de facto capital of the Dutch East Indies. In the early 20th century, the Dutch East Indies government attempted to relocate the capital from Batavia to Bandung. During Indonesia's struggle for independence, the Indonesian government moved the capital to Yogyakarta and then to Bukittinggi, where it remained for a short time until the restoration of control to Jakarta. In 2019, during his annual state of the union address at the parliament, President Joko Widodo announced a plan to relocate the capital to Kalimantan on the island of Borneo. As part of the plan, part of Kutai Kartanegara Regency and Penajam North Paser Regency in East Kalimantan will be carved out to create a new province-level planned city, and the capital will be relocated to a more central location within Indonesia. On 17 January 2022, the name was revealed to be Nusantara.

The plan is part of a strategy to reduce developmental inequality between Java and other islands in the Indonesian archipelago and to reduce Jakarta's burden as Indonesia's primary hub. In August 2019, the government announced that while the capital will be moved, $40 billion will be spent on saving Jakarta from sinking in the next decade.

On 5 June 2024, Indonesian President Joko Widodo said construction of the first phase of Nusantara was 80% complete, and he would have an office there once clean water became available. However, this did not happen. The new capital is planned to be about twice the size of New York City. Officials say it will be a futuristic green city centered around forests and parks that utilize renewable energy sources and smart waste management.

== Timeline ==
Capitals of Indonesia throughout history

Date	Capital	Notes
17 August 1945	Jakarta	Sukarno and Mohammad Hatta proclaimed the independence of Indonesia in Jakarta, which became the de facto capital of the Republic of Indonesia.
4 January 1946	Yogyakarta	Jakarta was occupied by the Netherlands Indies Civil Administration (NICA) and the capital was moved to Yogyakarta. The Indonesian government relocated to the city using a train in the middle of the night.
19 December 1948	Bukittinggi	Yogyakarta was occupied by the Dutch military during Operation Kraai, while both the president and vice president, Sukarno and Hatta, were captured and exiled on Bangka Island. The Emergency Government of the Republic of Indonesia (PDRI), a government-in-exile led by Sjafruddin Prawiranegara, was established in Bukittinggi.
6 July 1949	Yogyakarta	Sukarno and Hatta returned from exile to Yogyakarta. Sjafruddin Prawiranegara officially dissolved the emergency government on 13 July 1949. Yogyakarta continued as the capital of the Republic of Indonesia, which was a state within the Republic of the United States of Indonesia (formed on 27 December 1949). Jakarta served as the federal capital.
17 August 1950	Jakarta	The United States of Indonesia was dissolved by Sukarno, and Jakarta once again became the de facto capital of the Republic of Indonesia.
28 August 1961	Jakarta	Jakarta became the de jure capital of Indonesia with the Presidential Decree Number 2 of 1961. It was later strengthened by the Indonesian Law Number 10 of 1964.
26 August 2019	Jakarta	President Joko Widodo officially announced the relocation of the capital to East Kalimantan. Part of Kutai Kartanegara Regency and Penajam North Paser Regency would be taken for a new province-level planned city, which was expected to be inaugurated no later than 16 August 2024, but this did not occur due to delays.
30 November 2024	Jakarta (de facto)	President Prabowo Subianto signed Law No. 151/2024, officially removing "capital" from the name of the Jakarta Special Region.
17 August 2028 or afterwards	Nusantara	President Prabowo Subianto set the limit of the capital relocation, which will happen on 17 August 2028.

== Colonial period, Bandung and early republic era ==
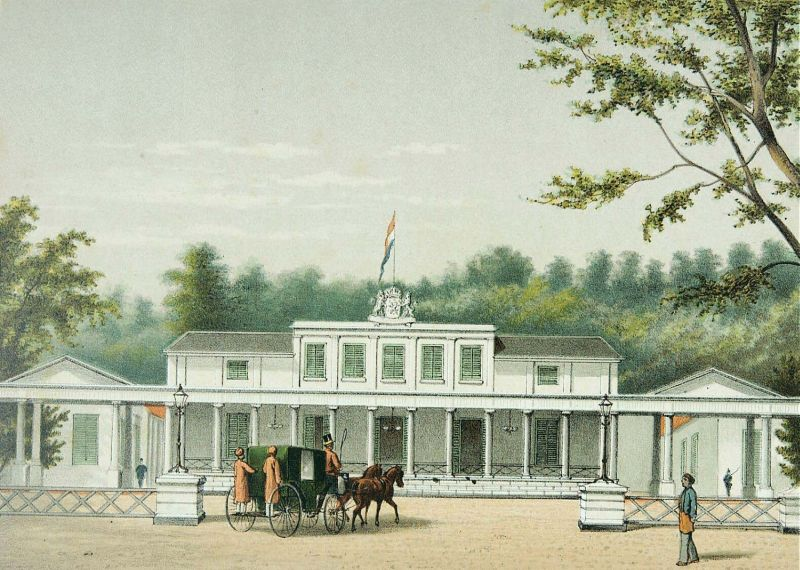
Lithograph of Paleis Rijswijk (present-day Istana Negara or State Palace) in the 1880s.

The Dutch colonial settlement of Batavia (present-day Jakarta) was established in 1621. Initially, it was a European-styled walled city crisscrossed by Dutch-style canals in a low-lying coastal swamp area. The poor sanitation and weak water drainage system made the city unhealthy, and it was infested with malaria, cholera, and dysentery. In 1808, Daendels decided to quit the by-then dilapidated and unhealthy Old Town. A new town centre was subsequently built further to the south, near the estate of Weltevreden. Batavia thereby became a city with two centres: Kota, as the hub of business, where the offices and warehouses of shipping and trading companies were located; and Weltevreden, the new home for the government, military, and shops. These two centres were connected by the Molenvliet Canal and a road (now Gajah Mada Road) that ran alongside the waterway.

In the early 20th century, the Dutch East Indies government decided to relocate the capital from Batavia to Bandung. The idea was to separate the busy trading port and the commercial centre (Batavia) from the new administrative and political centre (Bandung). By the 1920s the plan to transfer the capital to Bandung was underway. As the city began the master plan of a new city, some government buildings, telecommunication (now Telkom Indonesia), railway networks (now Kereta Api Indonesia), a postal system (now Pos Indonesia), defence-military headquarters, and more were constructed and headquartered in Bandung. Some are still here to this day, such as Gedung Sate, which was planned as the government administrative centre of the Dutch East Indies. The plan, however, failed due to the Great Depression and the outbreak of World War II.

On 5 March 1942, Batavia fell to the Japanese. The Dutch formally surrendered to the Japanese occupation forces on 9 March 1942, and the colony's rule was transferred to Japan. The city was renamed Jakarta (officially ジャカルタ特別市 Jakaruta tokubetsu-shi, Special Municipality of Jakarta, under the special status that was assigned to the city). After the collapse of Japan in 1945, the area went through a period of transition and upheaval during the Indonesian national struggle for independence. During the Japanese occupation and from the perspective of the Indonesian nationalists who declared independence on 17 August 1945, the city was once again renamed Jakarta.

Following the surrender of the Japanese, Indonesia declared its independence on 17 August 1945. The proclamation was enacted at Jalan Pegangsaan Timur No. 56 (now Jalan Proklamasi), Central Jakarta, with Suwiryo acting as the committee chairman. Suwiryo was recognised as the first mayor of Jakarta Tokubetsu Shi. The position was soon altered to Pemerintah Nasional Kota Jakarta ("Jakarta City National Administration"). On 19 September 1945, Sukarno held an Indonesian independence and anti-colonialism/imperialism speech during Rapat Akbar, or grand meeting, at Lapangan Ikada, now the Merdeka Square. The grand meeting would start a period of national revolution in Indonesia.

== National revolution period ==
During the Indonesian struggle for independence (1945–1949), prompted by political and military emergencies, the capital of the republic was moved several times, as the seat of the republic in exile during the war. The capital moved from Jakarta to Yogyakarta (1946–1948) and then to Bukittinggi (1948–1949) as the seat of the Emergency Government of the Republic of Indonesia. In 1949, the national capital of the republic returned to Jakarta.

== Jakarta as the de jure capital of Indonesia ==
Monas stands in the centre of Merdeka Square, in the heart of the national capital of Jakarta. Most of Jakarta's landmarks and monuments were built during the Sukarno era.

During Sukarno's presidency, Jakarta was established and developed as the capital of the new republic. In 1957, Sukarno laid the foundation and street grid layout of Palangkaraya as a new planned capital of Central Kalimantan province. Sukarno however, foresaw the new city as the possible new national capital in the future. The vast available area and its geographic location in the centre of the archipelago was the city's main advantage. Nevertheless, Sukarno seemed to favour Jakarta instead. In the late 1950s to the first half of the 1960s, he filled Jakarta with monuments and statues. Numbers of monumental projects were conceived, planned, and initiated during his administration, including Monumen Nasional, Istiqlal mosque, DPR/MPR Building, and Gelora Bung Karno stadium. Sukarno also filled Jakarta with nationalistic monuments and statues, including Selamat Datang Monument, Dirgantara Monument at Pancoran, and the West Irian Liberation Monument at Lapangan Banteng. Although many of the projects were completed later, Sukarno is credited for shaping Jakarta's monuments and landmarks. He desired Jakarta to be the beacon of a powerful new nation.

In 1966, Jakarta was granted its official status as DKI (Daerah Khusus Ibukota) Djakarta, or the Special Capital Region. It promoted the rate of development of government office buildings and foreign embassies. Jakarta's rapid development created the need for a master plan to regulate Jakarta's growth. Since 1966, Jakarta has steadily grown into a modern metropolis.

During the highly centralised New Order regime of Sukarno's successor Suharto, Jakarta was further established as the political and economic core of the nation. Prompted by rapid development and urbanisation, Jakarta attracted large numbers of new settlers from all over the archipelago, with the majority coming from rural Javanese towns. High-rise buildings sprung up, especially in Jakarta's commercial and financial centres along Thamrin, Sudirman, and Kuningan avenues. As a result, since the 1970s, the population of Jakarta has spiked tremendously and spilled into areas surrounding the capital. The Jabodetabek, or Greater Jakarta, region has become the largest and the most densely populated urban agglomeration in Southeast Asia.

== New capital proposals throughout the decades ==
Proposals to move the Indonesian capital from Jakarta to other locations have been discussed since the Sukarno presidency. Massive overpopulation, a lack of urban infrastructures such as public transportation facilities, gridlock traffic, encroachment of urban areas replacing open green spaces, spread of slums within the city, over-extraction of groundwater, and poor water drainage systems have led to Jakarta's ecological degradation. As groundwater was depleted, the city slowly sank lower; parts of Northern Jakarta are below sea level and regularly encounter floods. Jakarta experienced massive floods in 2007 and 2013. In 2010, the debate about the creation of a new capital that would be separated from the urban, economic, and commercial centre of the country continued. Former president Susilo Bambang Yudhoyono supported the idea to create a new political and administrative centre of Indonesia due to Jakarta's environmental and overpopulation problems.

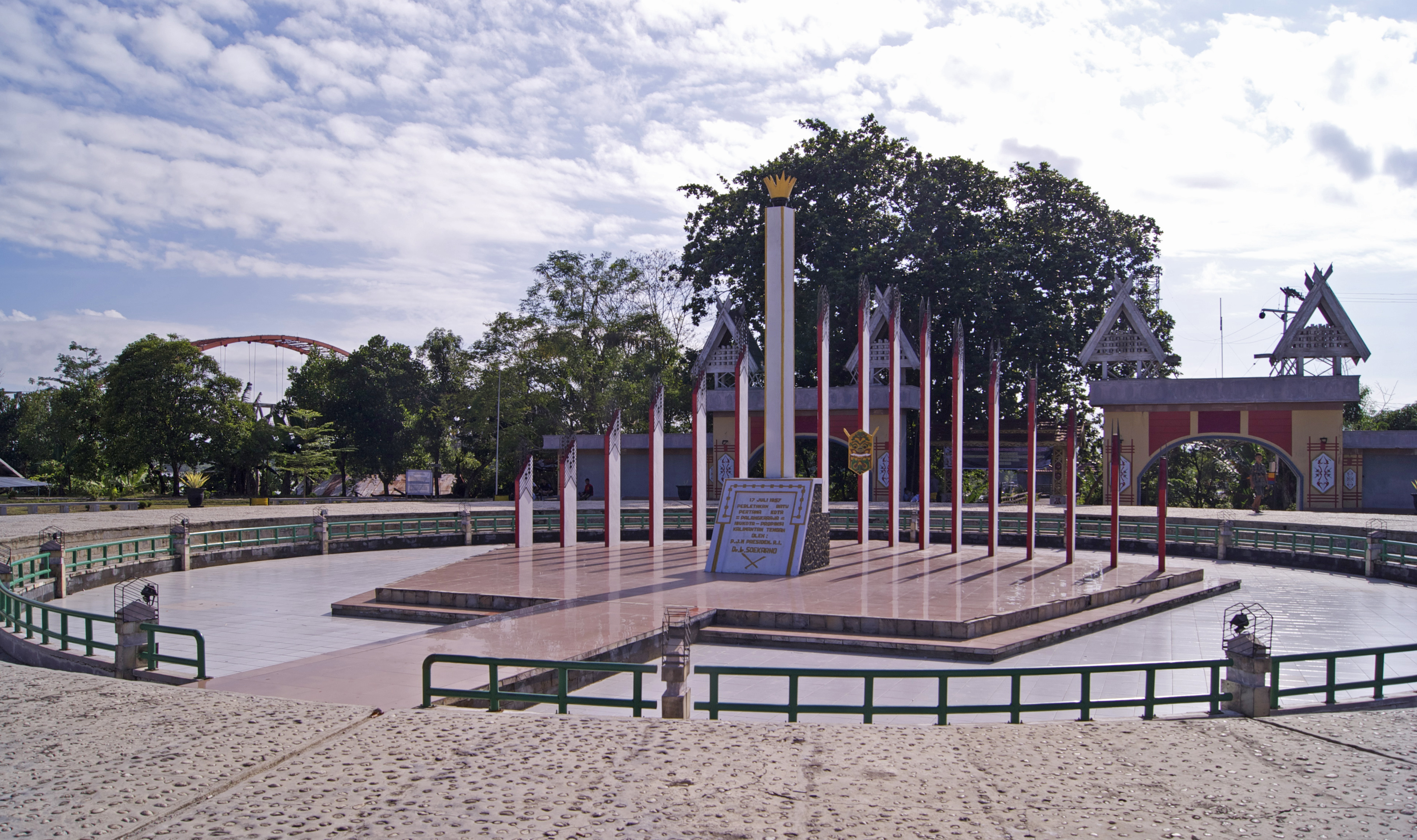
Monument built to inaugurate the groundbreaking of Palangkaraya by President Sukarno, dated 17 July 1957. This monument is colloquially known locally as the Sukarno Monument.

Two major alternative approaches have been raised over the years: One was to move the national capital altogether by creating an entirely new planned city, similar to the relocation of the Brazilian capital from Rio de Janeiro to the planned city of Brasília in 1960. The other approach was to keep Jakarta as the official capital but to create a separate administrative centre, similar to when Malaysia moved its federal administrative centre to Putrajaya. Suggested locations for the first proposal include:

- Palangka Raya, Central Kalimantan. Since it was established as the capital of Central Kalimantan province in 1957, the first president of Indonesia, Sukarno, outlined a plan to develop Palangka Raya as the future capital of Indonesia. Palangka Raya is far more extensive in area than Jakarta and is safe from the danger of earthquakes and volcanoes, which are common on Java.
- Banjarmasin, South Kalimantan. Compared to Palangka Raya, Banjarmasin is located closer to the centre of the country, has better access to the Java Sea, and has better infrastructure.
- Kota Merdeka is a proposed planned city located north of Pangkalan Bun town, West Kotawaringin Regency, Central Kalimantan. Compared to far inland Palangka Raya, Kota Merdeka is located nearer to coastal areas and has better access to the Java Sea.
- Pontianak, West Kalimantan. Located ideally on the equator and strategically located by the Karimata Strait and the South China Sea, it is in the same region as other ASEAN capitals such as Singapore, Kuala Lumpur, and Bandar Seri Begawan.
- Palembang, South Sumatra. The city has historical significance as the former capital of the Srivijaya maritime empire, which symbolises the return of the archipelago's former glory. It is also strategically located near the main maritime route of the Malacca strait, near the other ASEAN capitals of Singapore and Kuala Lumpur.

If Jakarta were kept as the official capital, administrative centres would have been moved to other nearby locations. Suggested locations include:

- Jonggol, West Java, located about 40 kilometres southeast of Jakarta, and proposed future capital of Indonesia since the New Order.
- Karawang, West Java, located about 60 kilometres east of Jakarta.
- Kertajati, Majalengka Regency, West Java, located about 200 kilometres east of Jakarta and 40 kilometres west of Cirebon. The proposed planned capital will be connected to the planned new West Java airport, Java railways, and the Trans-Java toll road. The underused airport has been derided as a 'white elephant' during the 2019 presidential elections and policymakers are under pressure to demonstrate utility for the enormous bills related to the project.
- Maja, Banten, located about 60 kilometres west of Jakarta. Most of Maja's lands are already acquired by the Indonesian Bank Restructuring Agency.
- Jakarta Bay, North Jakarta. In 2013, Joko Widodo, then Governor of Jakarta, proposed to move the administrative centre of Indonesia to the planned future reclaimed islands in Jakarta Bay. This plan is in line with the planned National Capital Integrated Coastal Development; the new administrative district will be located on a Garuda bird-shaped island planned to be built on Jakarta Bay.

== Relocation to Nusantara ==
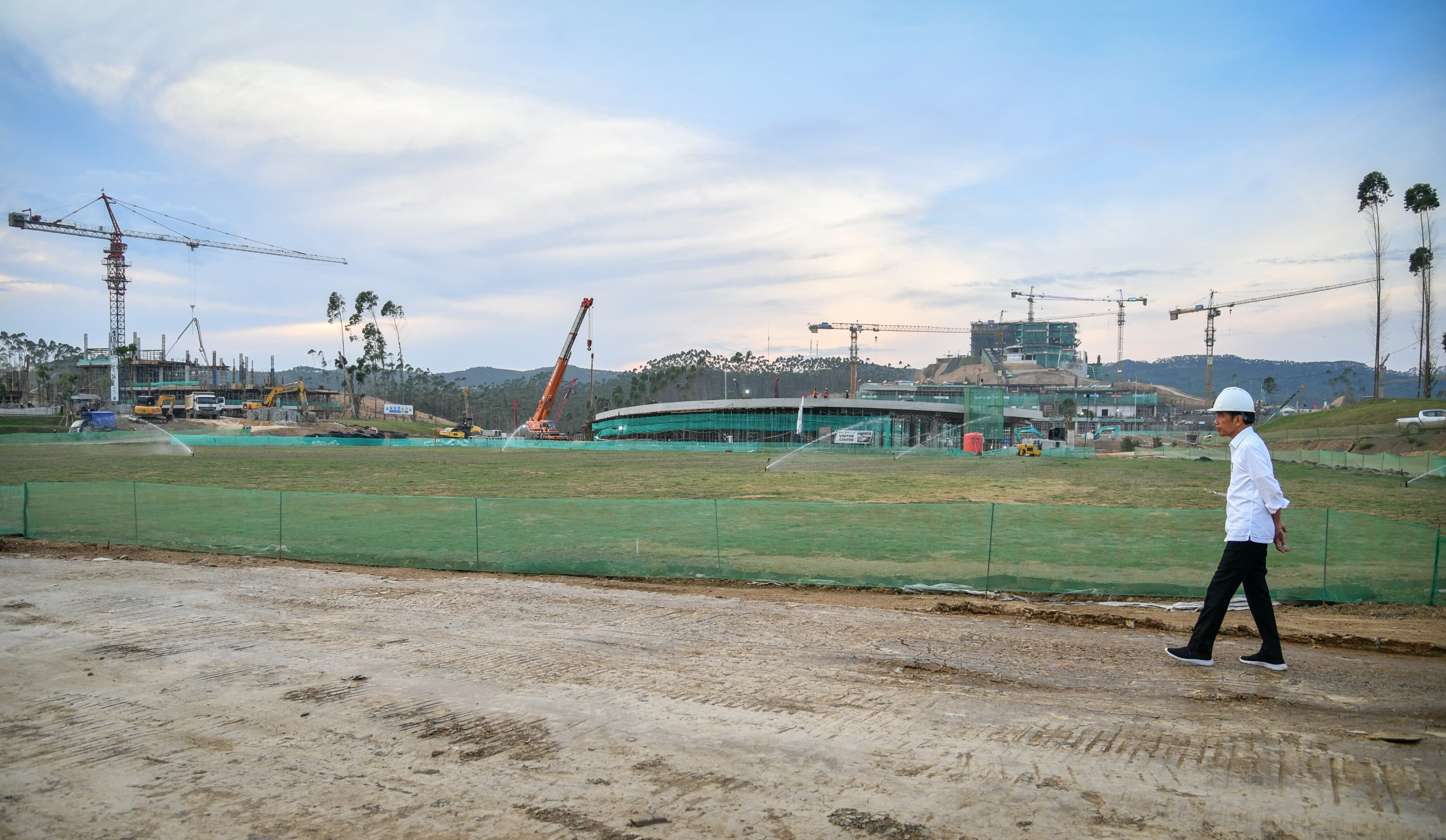
Joko Widodo in Nusantara. The future presidential palace can be seen in the background.

In April 2017, the Joko Widodo (Jokowi) administration considered moving the capital from Jakarta. The government planned to finish assessing potential alternative sites for Indonesia's new capital by the end of 2017. According to an official from the Ministry of National Development Planning of Indonesia (Bappenas), the government was determined to move the Indonesian capital out of Java. In April 2019, it was announced that Jakarta would no longer be the capital of Indonesia in the future, with a ten-year plan to transfer all government offices to a new capital city. The National Development Planning Ministry recommended the three provinces of South, Central, and East Kalimantan as they all met the requirements for a new capital, including being relatively free from earthquakes and volcanoes. Shortly after the plan was announced in April 2017, Jokowi visited two alternative locations in Kalimantan, Bukit Soeharto in East Kalimantan and the Triangle Area near Palangka Raya in Central Kalimantan.

The development of Nusantara began in 23 August 2019, when Jokowi submitted Presidential Letter No. R-34/Pres/08/2019. The Letter enclosed with 2 enclosures: (1) Presidential Study Report on Capital Relocation, and (2) Request on DPR Support for Capital Relocation.

On 26 August 2019, Jokowi announced that the new capital would be partly in the Penajam North Paser Regency and partly in the Kutai Kartanegara Regency, both in East Kalimantan. The National Development Planning Ministry announced that the move would cost an estimated Rp466 trillion (US$32.7 billion) and that the government intended to cover 19% of the cost, the remainder coming mainly from public-private partnerships and direct investment by both state-owned enterprises and the private sector. The Indonesian parliament passed the bill on 18 January 2022, with construction not expected to start until after the COVID-19 vaccination campaign completes in March 2022.

In early September 2021, the Bill for Capital Relocation completed. On 29 September 2021, the Jokowi administration, through the State Secretary and Ministry of National Development Planning, submitted a letter containing an omnibus bill for relocation of the capital to the People's Representatives Council (DPR). Among many items prescribed in the bill, it contained the plan of formation of the Nusantara Capital City Authority (Indonesian: Otorita Ibu Kota Negara Nusantara), a special agency responsible to the new capital and accountable to the President. The new agency possessed ministry-like qualities due to its officeholder being appointed by the president, but with special governing capabilities which make it somewhat similar to a provincial governor. It will also regulate on how the Capital Authority operates its funding, taxing and retribution management, and managing assets on the new capital.

On 17 January 2022, during the Special Committee Meeting of the DPR with the Government and the Regional Representatives Council (DPD), Minister of National Development Planning, Suharso Monoarfa, said the new nation's capital would be named Nusantara.

Due to the plan being submitted in the middle of Jokowi's second and final term, the People's Consultative Assembly asked for an amendment to the Constitution of Indonesia, re-establishing its authority to establish the Principles of State Policies (Indonesian: Pokok-Pokok Haluan Negara, PPHN) in order to provide security and sustainability for the project in the long term and thus ensuring its continuation after Jokowi leaves office.

=== Political structure ===
Geopolitically, the capital's territory are likely to be formed as a new province from the districts Sepaku from Penajam North Paser Regency and Samboja from Kutai Kartanegara Regency.

=== Proposed design and name ===
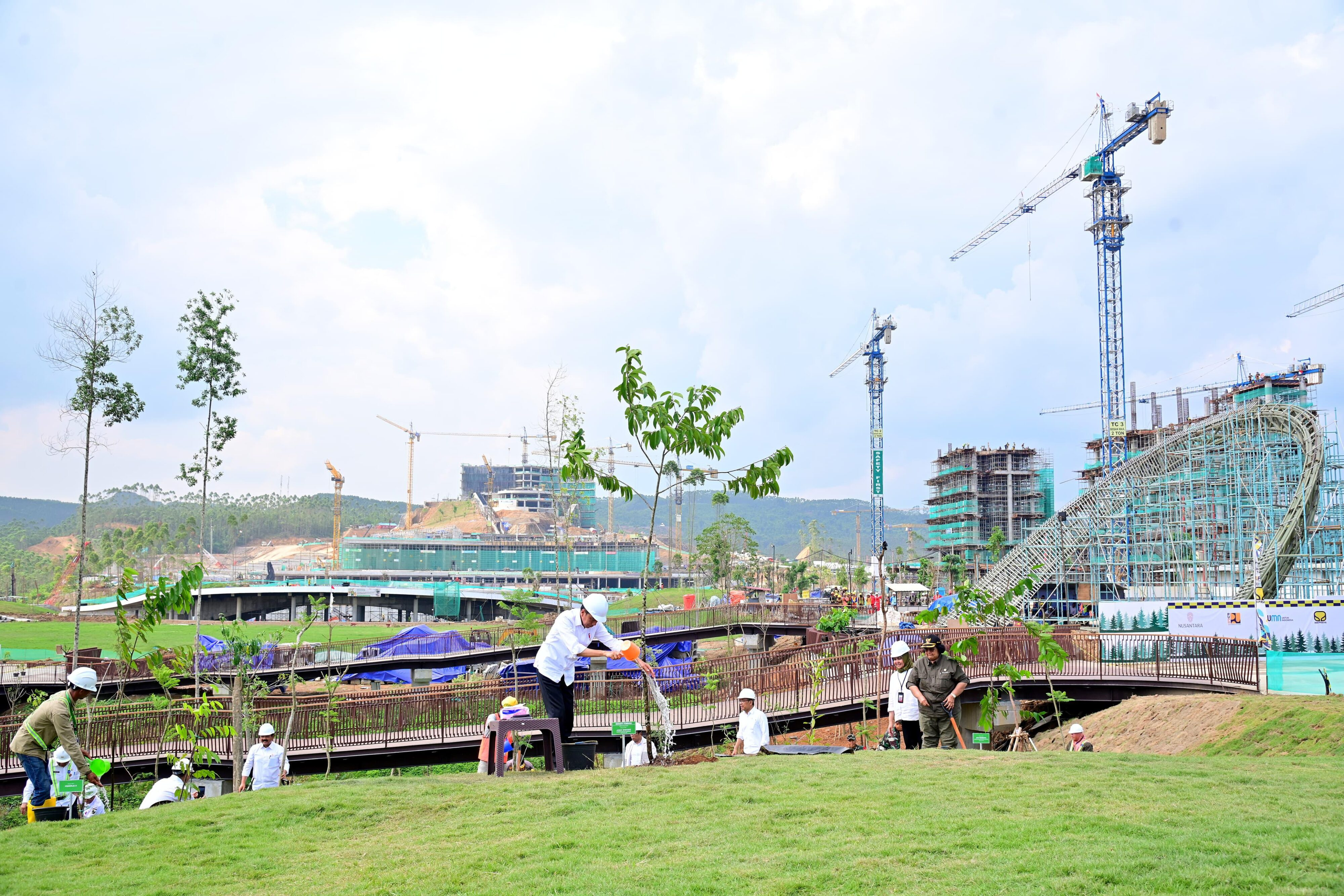
Trees being planted on the construction site

Then Ministry of Public Works and Public Housing organized a capital city design contest from 3 October to 20 December 2019. The winner, Nagara Rimba Nusa ('Forest Archipelago') by URBAN+ was officially announced on 23 December 2019. The government will collaborate on the design of the winning team with that of the second- and third-placed teams, as well as international designers, to sharpen the final design process up to March or April 2020. Designers from at least 3 countries, namely China, Japan, and the United States had offered to be involved in the design. The name, which had been suggested about 3 months earlier, is aligned with the winner's main concept.

On 17 January 2022, the name of the new capital city was revealed to be Nusantara.

== See also ==
- List of national capitals
- List of former national capitals
- List of purpose-built national capitals
