= Edhi Sunarso =

Indonesian sculptor (1932–2016)

- Born: Sunarso; July 2, 1932; Salatiga, Dutch East Indies
- Died: January 4, 2016 (aged 83); Bantul, Yogyakarta
- Resting place: Girisapto Imogiri Artist Cemetery
- Known for: Sculpture
- Notable work: Selamat Datang Monument; Dirgantara Monument

Edhi Sunarso, born Sunarso, (July 2, 1932 – January 4, 2016) was an Indonesian sculptor and public artist known for numerous well-known monuments and landmarks found throughout Jakarta, including the Selamat Datang Monument and Dirgantara statue (Patung Dirgantara), also called the Pancoran Monument, in Pancoran, South Jakarta. He taught sculpture at Yogyakarta State University (formerly IKIP Yogyakarta) and the Indonesian Institute of the Arts, Yogyakarta.

He was born on July 2, 1932, in Salatiga, Central Java, Dutch East Indies. Like many Indonesians, he was born with just one name, Sunarso. He took the name Edhi Sunarso, after a fellow fighter who was killed during the Indonesian National Revolution for independence from the Netherlands. In 1942, Sunarso was captured by Dutch forces during a pro-independence mission in Bandung. He was imprisoned in Kebonwaru, Bandung, by the Royal Netherlands East Indies Army until 1949.

Sunarso initially began sculpting and practicing art while detained in the Royal Netherlands East Indies Army prison. Upon his release in 1949 (and the independence of Indonesia), Sunarso enrolled in the Indonesian College of Fine Arts (ASRI), now known as the Indonesian Institute of the Arts, Yogyakarta (ISI). He then won a scholarship from UNESCO to attend the Visva-Bharati University in India.

In 1956, Edhi Sunarso was awarded second prize at an international competition in the United Kingdom for his stone sculpture, "The Unknown Political Prisoner." His prize won the attention of Indonesian officials, including President Sukarno. During the 1950s, Sukarno had ordered the destruction of statues and monuments which had been erected by Dutch authorities during the colonial era.

Sukarno commissioned Sunarso and his colleagues in 1958 to create a sculpture which would greet athletes arriving for the 1962 Asian Games four years later. By 1959, Sunarso had completed the Selamat Datang Monument, which means "Welcome" in Indonesian, which is now considered an important Jakarta landmark.

Sukarno commissioned Sunarso to complete several other monuments located throughout Jakarta. In 1964, he installed the West Irian Liberation Monument at Lapangan Banteng to mark the Indonesian takeover of West Papua (Dutch New Guinea). The Dirgantara statue, located in Pancoran, South Jakarta, was built in 1966. First commissioned by Sukarno before he was overthrown in 1967, the former President reportedly considered selling his own car to fund the construction of Dirgantara, which "symbolizes courage, gallantry and dedication in aviation." Dirgantara underwent its first cleaning and restoration in 2014.

Sunarso also crafted sculptures for individual collectors, as well as dioramas commissioned by the Government of Indonesia. Sunarso may well be the only artist who worked with all regimes, all throughout the time, including after Reformasi (Indonesia). Artists from Sukarno's era are generally attached, or associated in whatever ways, to the Communist Party of Indonesia or its cultural under-bow, Lembaga Kebudajaan Rakjat. This means that during Soeharto's regime, such communist artists would have been either annihilated, silenced, or put in prison, at the very least. Right after Reformasi, artists who worked under the Soeharto regime would have been skipped from the public reference, as they'd be considered allies to the previous oppressive and cruel government.

Edhi Sunarso died from heart failure following prostate surgery in Yogyakarta on January 4, 2016, at the age of 83. He was buried beside his late wife Kustiyah in the Girisapto Imogiri Artist Cemetery in Bantul, Special Region of Yogyakarta. Sunarso was survived by his two daughters and two sons.
