= Kustiyah =

Indonesian painter (1935-2012)

- Born: Koestijah; 2 September 1935; Probolinggo, East Java, Dutch East Indies
- Died: 1 June 2012 (aged 76); Yogyakarta, East Java, Indonesia
- Resting place: Girisapto Imogiri Artist Cemetery, Bantul, Yogyakarta
- Other names: Koestijah, Tjus, Kus, Kustijah, Kustiyah E. S, Kustiyah Edhi Sunarso
- Education: Indonesian Institute of the Arts, Yogyakarta (1953-1957)
- Known for: Painting
- Works: Torso (1960); Tiga domba (Three sheep) (1963); Kambing hitam (Black sheep) (1969)
- Movement: Realism; Impressionism; Expressionism
- Spouse: Edhi Sunarso (m. 1955)
- Children: Rosa Arus Sagara, Titiana Irawani, Satya Rasa Sunarso, Sari Prasetyo Angkasa
- Parents: Notowisastro (d. 1965) (father); Nyi Mas Kasiyani (d. 1957) (mother)
- Relatives: Muchsan, Sunardi Yudowardoyo, Jaminudin, Sumarno, Mariliati Husodo

Kustiyah (1935–2012) was an Indonesian artist.

== Career ==
Kustiyah was born in Probolinggo. She trained at ASRI Arts Academy in Yogyakarta (now Indonesian Institute of the Arts, Yogyakarta) and continued her work as part of the Pelukis Rakyat (Peoples’ Artists) and Pelukis Indonesia (Indonesian Painters) groups. Much of her formative work—whether landscape or still life and portraiture—pictured scenes from everyday life and were painted outside of a studio setting.

Kustiyah was one of the few female painters working at the time. Early on, her work was collected by major government institutions, including the National Gallery of Indonesia. She participated in the first all female painting and sculpture exhibition in 1956, presented at the Young Artists of Indonesia (Seniman Indonesia Muda studio in Yogyakarta.

Throughout her career, she consistently participated in group art exhibitions in Jakarta and Yogyakarta and counted among her peers, such as Kartika Affandi, Siti Ruliyati, as well as others who formed the IKAISYO/Ikatan Istri Senirupawan Yogyakarta (Yogyakarta Artist's Wives Association).

Her deteriorating health eventually limited her public visibility as well as that of her work, but she continued to paint through the mid 2000s.

After Kustiyah's passing, her husband, the well-known sculptor Edhi Sunarso, built a private museum in her honor, called the Griya Seni Hj. Kustiyah Edhi Sunarso, which houses a large collection of her paintings to this day. When he passed in 2016, he was buried next to her, at Girisapto Imogiri Artist Cemetery in Bantul, Yogyakarta.
