= Kalibata =

Urban village in South Jakarta, Indonesia

- Administrative village
- Interactive map of Kalibata
- Country: Indonesia
- Province: DKI Jakarta
- Administrative city: South Jakarta
- District: Pancoran

Kalibata is a kelurahan (literally "ward", in this case the smallest unit in the sub-division of urban areas), part of Pancoran which is itself a subdistrict of South Jakarta, Indonesia. The ward name comes from "kali" and "bata" meaning river mostly filled with rocks, so the local people called this place as Kalibata The word Kalibata started to be a common word when a shoes factory plant, Bata that was located there during the previous Dutch occupation.

== Cemetery ==
Kalibata is noteworthy as the location of the Kalibata Military Cemetery or "Heroes' Cemetery", where veterans of the Indonesian National Revolution and other prominent people are buried - including National Heroes of Indonesia.

Australia's Prime Ministers Rudd and Gillard have paid visits to lay wreaths at the cemetery.

== Kalibata City ==
The 12-hectare superblock in South Jakarta, Kalibata City applies the concept of Affordable Public Residential Superblock that consists of Kalibata Residences, Kalibata Regency and Green Palace Apartment. The superblock features Kalibata City Square, a state of the art mall located at the center of Kalibata City, as well as schools, offices and commercial areas. The 7,000 sqm Kalibata City Forest, which serves as Outbound Adventure Park, is designed to be the 'lung' of the superblock.

=== Resident community ===
Several residents of Kalibata City formed an organization called Komunitas Warga Kalibata City (KWKC) to pursue their objectives in advocating against predation by the apartment management. On 10 April 2016, KWKC launched its website consisting features such as news, events and forum.

=== Controversy ===
==== Murder case ====
On 1 October 2013, there was a murder case in Ebony tower, one of the kalibata city complex tower. On 9 October 2013, two people allegedly have connection to the murder are arrested.

==== Resident protest ====
In February 2015, dozens of residents staged a protest by walking around the apartment buildings. They protest because the apartments' maintenance fees have increased by 43 percent and the apartment management's lack of transparency. Also there are many criminal acts in this apartment complex, like murder, drug abuse and robbery.

==== Prostitution ====
On 26 April 2015, Kalibata City is allegedly linked to the online prostitution practice. The Jakarta Police arrested members of a prostitution ring operating out of the Kalibata City after discovering that the group had been attracting customers through Twitter.
