= Bendungan Hilir, Tanah Abang =

Bendungan Hilir
- Administrative village
- Interactive map of Bendungan Hilir
- Coordinates: 6°12′S 106°48′E
- Country: Indonesia
- Province: DKI Jakarta
- Administrative city: Central Jakarta
- District: Tanah Abang

Area
  - Total: 1.58 km^{2} (0.61 sq mi)

Population (2013)
  - Total: 20,025
  - Density: 12,674/km^{2} (32,830/sq mi)
- Postal code: 10210

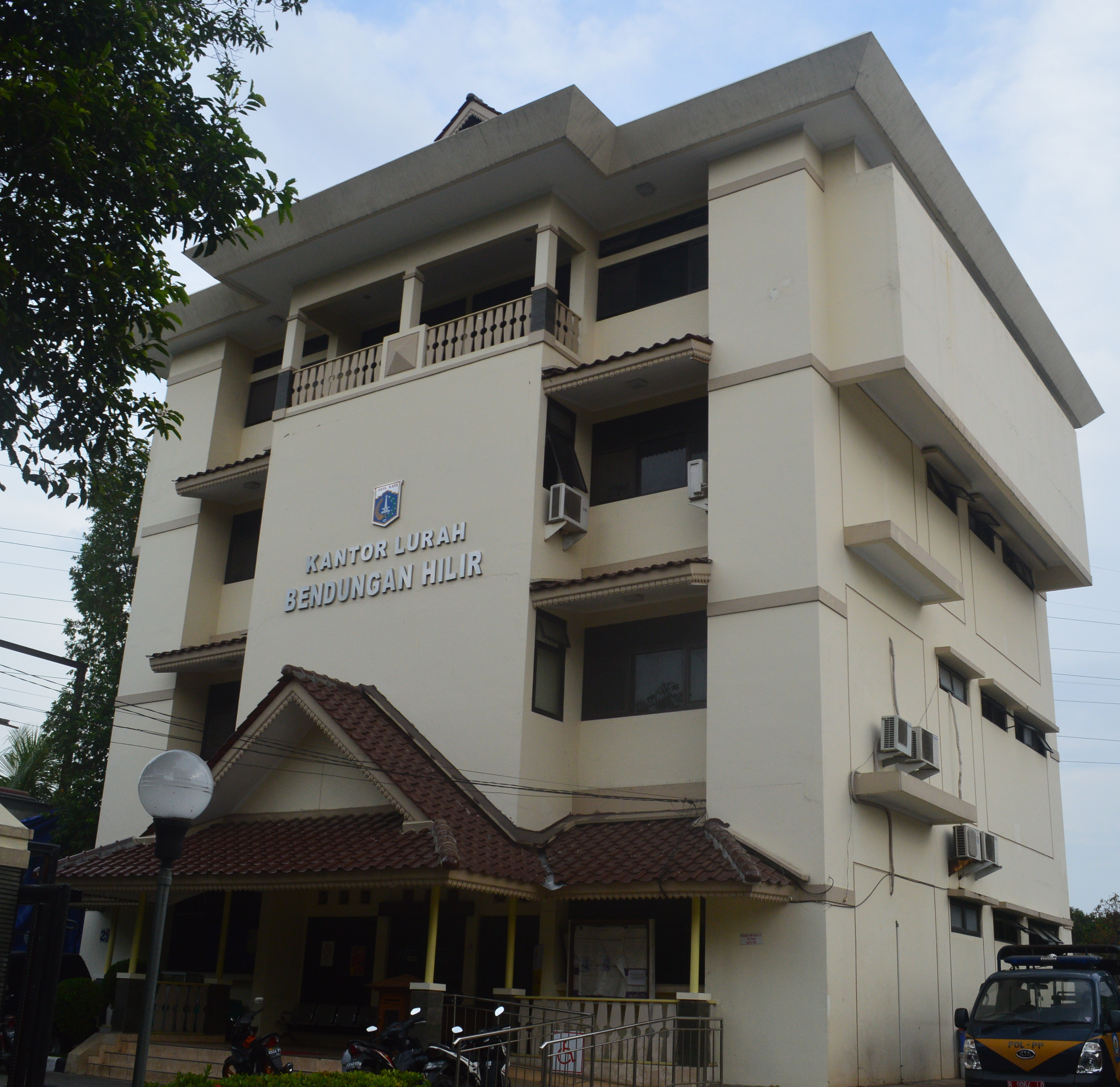
Bendungan Hilir administrative village office

Bendungan Hilir (or abbreviated "Benhil") is an administrative village in the Tanah Abang district of Central Jakarta, Indonesia. It has a population of 20,025 people.

== Pejompongan and Bendungan Hilir neighborhood ==
Pejompongan and Bendungan Hilir were two residential neighborhoods located to the west side of Krukut River and bounded by Penjernihan Road, Jalan Jenderal Gatot Subroto and Sudirman Road. The neighborhoods were located to the north of Gelora Bung Karno sport complex. Pejompongan and Bendungan Hilir were among the first neighborhood developed after independence period.

With the planning and development of Gatot Subroto Road in the 1950s, 25 hectares of land at Pejompongan and 6 hectares land at Bendungan Hilir were opened in 1952 for the development of a new housing. This housing were developed particularly for civil servants who needed to stay in Jakarta to do their duty.

The other 15 hectares of land at Pejompongan was opened for a water purification plant that was completed in 1957 (hence the name of the road, Penjernihan ("purification") road. In the 1960s, both the northern part of Pejompongan and Bendungan Hilir had already been established.

== Inportant events ==
On 28 August 2025, a 21-year-old Indonesian motorcycle taxi driver Affan Kurniawan was struck and run over by a police armored vehicle belonging to the Mobile Brigade Corps (Brimob) of the Greater Jakarta Metropolitan Regional Police during a protest near the People's Consultative Assembly (MPR) and House of Representatives (DPR) complex in Central Jakarta. The incident triggered larger demonstrations in various parts of Indonesia and received significant attention from both the government and the public.

== See also ==
- Districts of Indonesia
- List of administrative villages of Jakarta

== Cited works ==
- Merrillees, Scott (2015). Jakarta: Portraits of a Capital 1950-1980. Jakarta: Equinox Publishing. ISBN 9786028397308.
