= Pejompongan =

Inner suburb of Jakarta, Indonesia, initially for bourgeois public-sector employees

Pejompongan is a residential area located northeast of Gelora Bung Karno Sports Complex, and in the south area of Slipi in Jakarta, Indonesia. This area was built as residential area for upper middle-class government employees and employees of other state institutions since 1950s. Pejompongan region Administratively located in the District of Tanah Abang and mostly located in the Village of Bendungan Hilir.

Historically, the development of Pejompongan started with the plan to build clean water treatment in the area of central Jakarta. The first water-treatment plant was built in 1957. To improve the quality of raw water air supply, the city later built another plan in 1966. Pejompongan area is also known for its unique and exotic culinary choices.
