= West Irian Liberation Monument =

- Monumen Pembebasan Irian Barat (Indonesian)
- Interactive map of West Irian Liberation Monument
- 6.170298°S 106.834925°E
- Location: Sawah Besar, Jakarta, Indonesia

History
- Built: 1963

Site notes
- Architects: Friedrich Silaban; Henk Ngantung
- Sculptor: Edhi Sunarso

West Irian Liberation Monument (Indonesian: Monumen Pembebasan Irian Barat) is a postwar modernist monument located in Jakarta, Indonesia. It is located in the center of Lapangan Banteng (formerly Waterloo Square) in Sawah Besar, Central Jakarta. Sukarno, then President of Indonesia, commissioned the monument in 1963 following the West New Guinea dispute in which Indonesia received the territory of Western New Guinea from the Netherlands.

== Description ==
The West Irian Liberation Monument is located in the center of Lapangan Banteng, facing west towards the St. Ursula Catholic School across the road from the park. The park itself was formerly known as the Waterlooplein, a parade ground of the colonial administration.

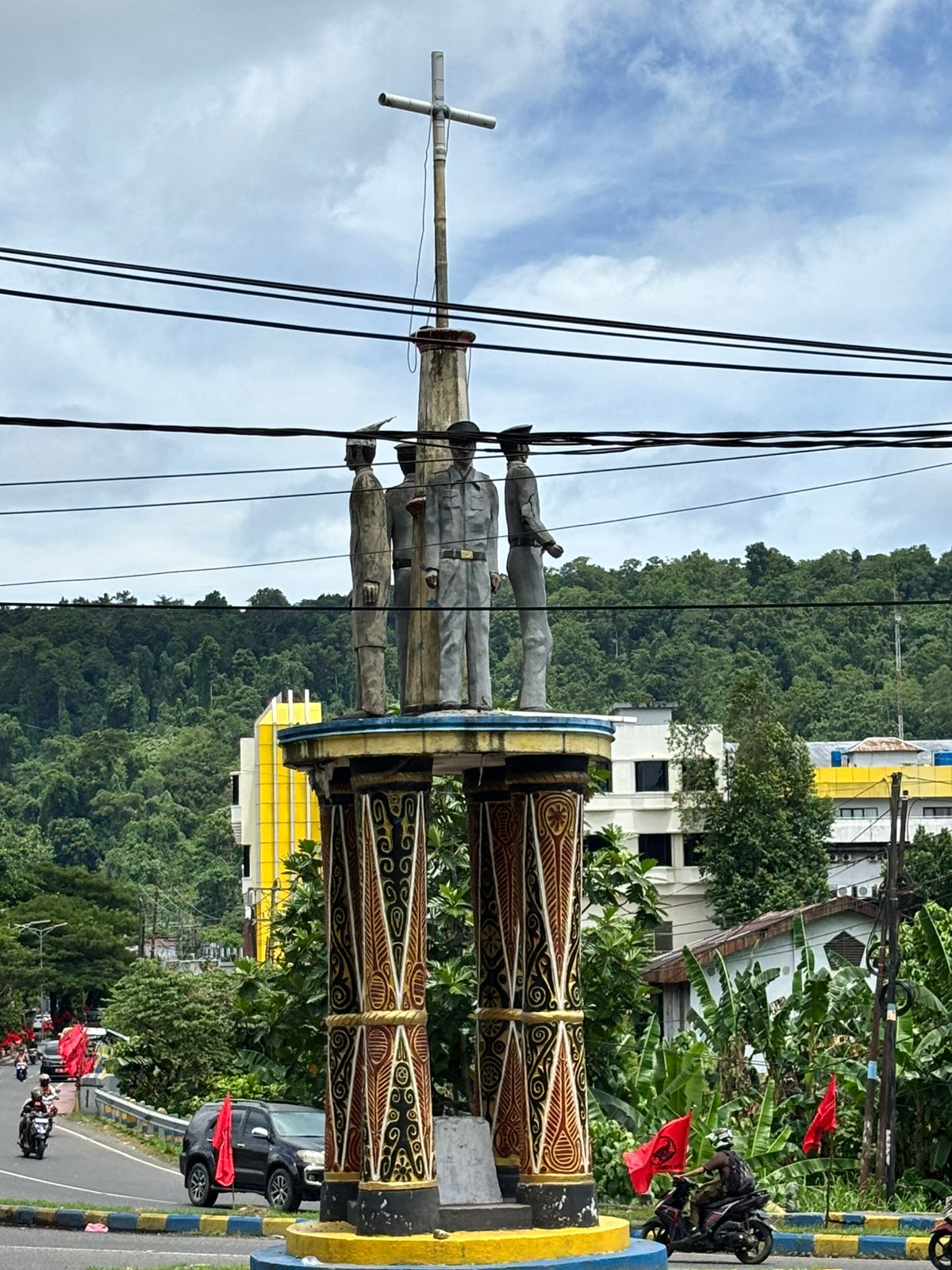
Tugu Trikora Manokwari Barat West Papua

On top of the monument, visible as a 36-meter high pedestal, stands a bronze, bare chested wild-haired man breaking free from his shackles with his arms and legs widely spread, the former facing towards the sky. The face holds a loud, screaming expression, symbolizing rebellion and independence.

== History ==
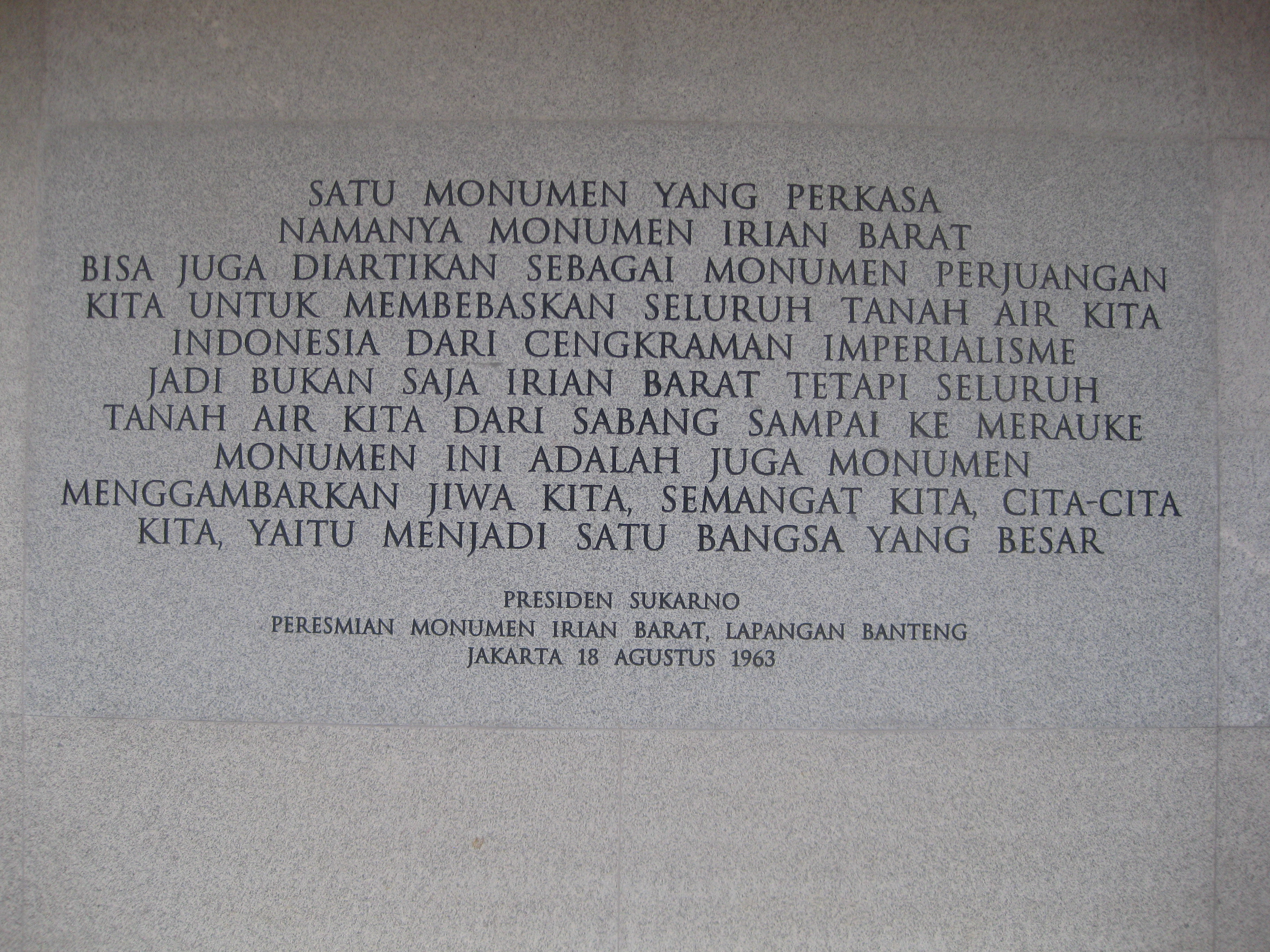
Inauguration plaque of the West Irian Liberation Monument.

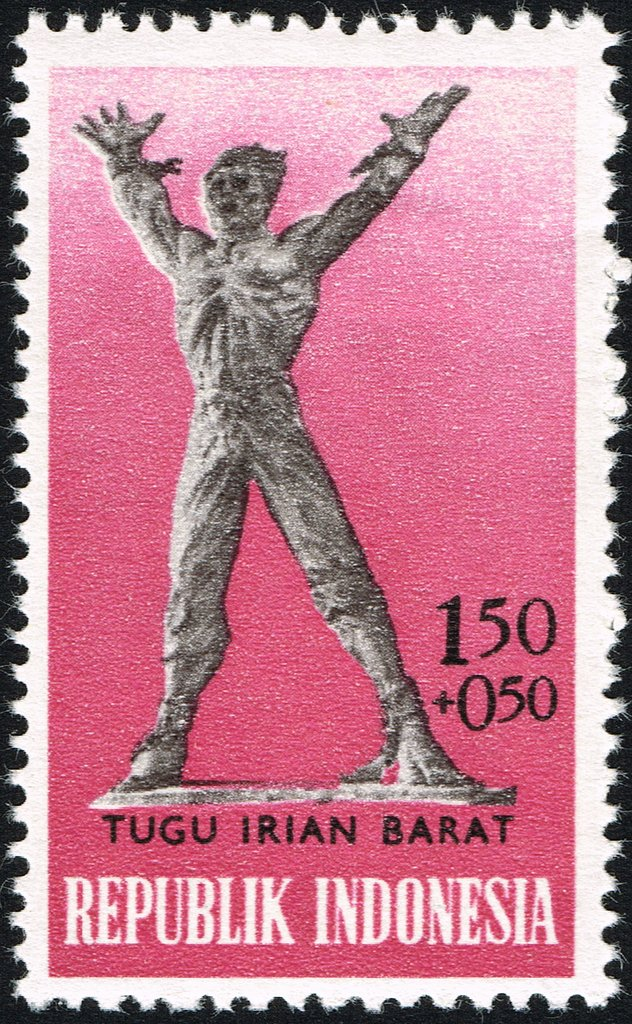
1963 stamp commemorating the monument.

In the late 1950s and early 1960s, the Netherlands still possessed the western part of New Guinea, which it had agreed to discuss a year after the Round Table Conference. Following failed negotiations and the incorporation of the region into Netherlands, Sukarno decided to adopt a more forceful stance, later escalating into military operations such as Operation Trikora. After the New York Agreement in 1962, the Netherlands agreed to hand over the territory to Indonesia.

The statue was officially commemorated on 17 August 1963, at the 18th independence day of the country and a year after it began construction. As of today, the monument is under the responsibility of Jakarta's parks services.

== Design ==
The statue of the West Irian Liberation Monument has been commissioned earlier in 1962 before the actual annexation of West Irian into Indonesia. On Independence Day, 17 August 1962, a pro-integration rally was held in front of the palace and Johannes Abraham Dimara wore chains which was severed in front of the crowds at Lapangan Banteng, Jakarta. Sukarno was inspired by the moment, and commissioned a statue of the liberation of West Irian. The design of the monument was based on a sketch by the artist Henk Ngantung who was also the deputy governor of Jakarta from 1964 to 1965. The design of the monument shows a muscular man, shouting, with arms outstretched breaking free of the chains of colonialism. The bronze statue is about 11 metres (36 ft) tall from feet to the tip of its outstretched fingers. The statue stands over a 20-metre (66 ft) tall pedestal in postwar modernist style. The 36-metre (118 ft) high tugu (statue and pedestal) was erected at the center of Lapangan Banteng.

The bronze statue was sculpted by Team Pematung Keluarga Area Yogyakarta (Yogyakarta Area Family of Sculptors Team) which was led by Edhi Sunarso. Edhi Sunarso also executed the Selamat Datang Monument and the Dirgantara Monument in Jakarta. Friedrich Silaban acted as the architect for the project.

The location of the West Irian Liberation Monument was supposed to be the first monument seen by people visiting Jakarta through the Kemayoran Airport.

== See also ==
Other statues constructed by Edhi Sunarso in the 1960s:

- Selamat Datang Monument
- Dirgantara Monument

== Cited works ==
- Lecrec, Jacques (1993). "3. Mirrors and the lighthouse: A search for meaning in the monuments and great works of Sukarno's Jakarta, 1960-1966". In Nas, Peter J.M. (ed.). Urban Symbolism. BRILL. ISBN 978-90-04-09855-8.
- Merrillees, Scott (2015). Jakarta: Portraits of a Capital 1950-1980. Jakarta: Equinox Publishing. ISBN 978-602-8397-30-8.
