= Pancoran, South Jakarta =

District of South Jakarta

Pancoran
- District
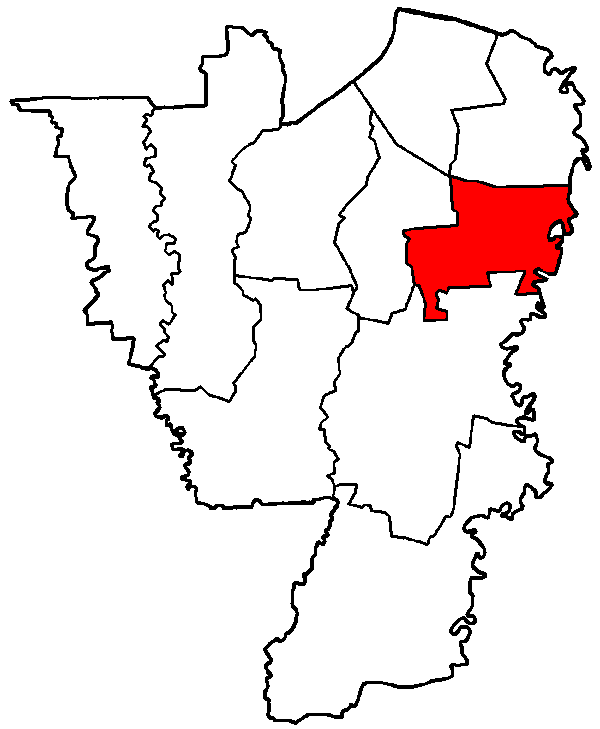
- Map showing the Pancoran District in South Jakarta

- Location in Java and Indonesia Pancoran (Indonesia)
- Coordinates: 6°15′28″S 106°49′23″E
- Country: Indonesia
- Province: Special Capital Region of Jakarta
- Administrative City: South Jakarta
- Established: 18 December 1990

Government
  - District Mayor: Alamsah

Area
  - Total: 8.53 km^{2} (3.29 sq mi)

Population (2021 Statistics Indonesia data)
  - Total: 168,600
- Time zone: UTC+7
- Area code: (+62) 21
- Vehicle registration: B
- Website: https://selatan.jakarta.go.id/

Pancoran is a district (kecamatan) of South Jakarta, one of the five administrative cities that form Jakarta, Indonesia. Pancoran District was originally part of Mampang Prapatan District until it was split off to form its district in 1990.

The boundaries of Pancoran District are the Ciliwung River to the east, the Mampang River to the west, and Kapten Tendean Road - Jend. Gatot Subroto - Letjen. MT Haryono and the Jakarta Inner Ring Road to the north.

== Kelurahan (urban villages) ==
The district of Pancoran is divided into six kelurahan or administrative villages:

- Kalibata - area code 12740
- Rawa Jati - area code 12750
- Duren Tiga - area code 12760
- Cikoko - area code 12770
- Pengadegan - area code 12770
- Pancoran - area code 12780

== List of important places ==
- Statue of Dirgantara
- Kalibata National Heroes' Cemetery
