= Dirgantara Monument =

Monument in Jakarta, Indonesia

- Monumen Patung Dirgantara (Indonesian)
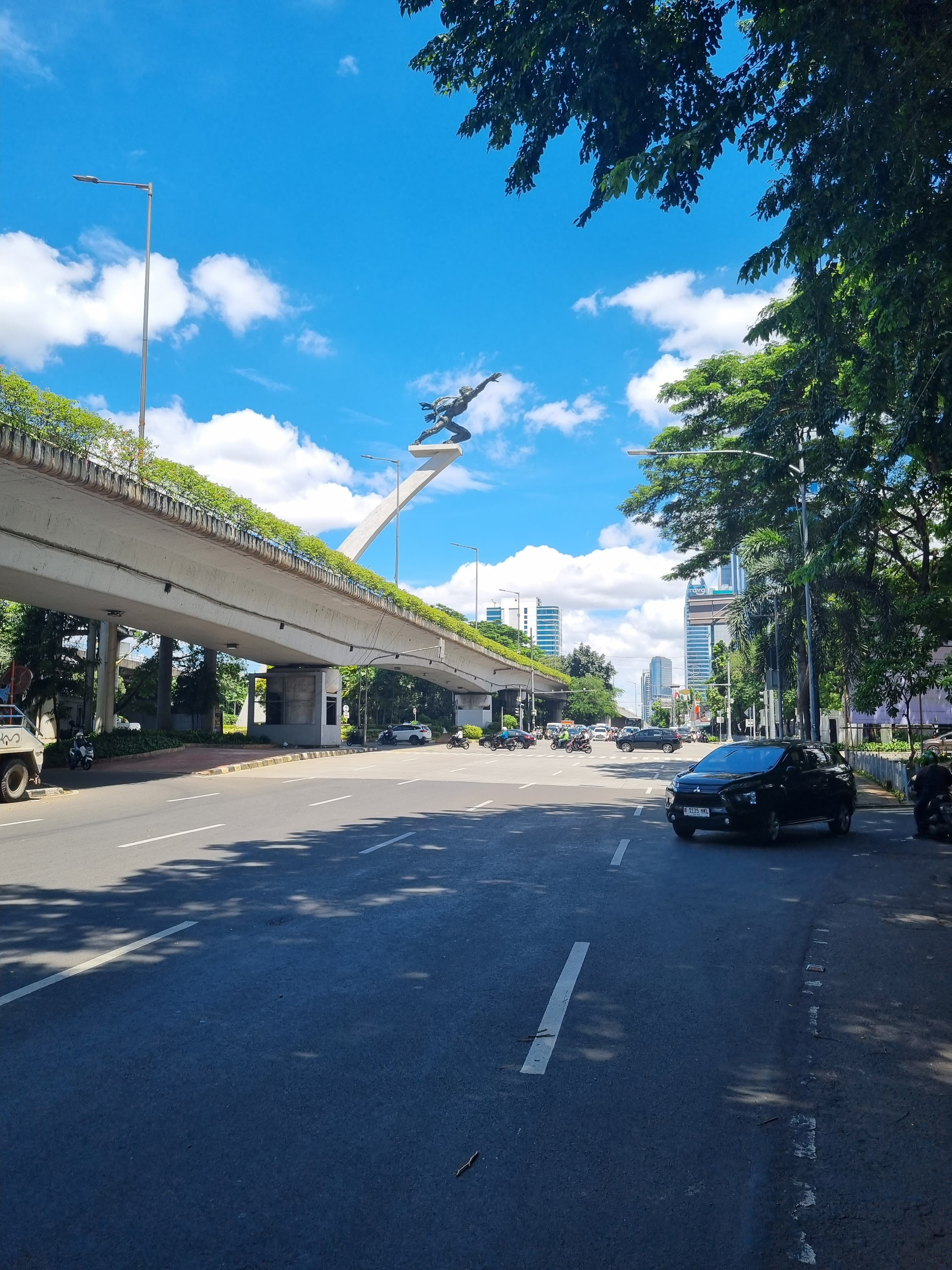
- Dirgantara Monument in 2023
- Interactive map of Dirgantara Monument
- 6.243085°S 106.843472°E
- Location: Pancoran, Jakarta, Indonesia

History
- Built: 1966

Site notes
- Sculptor: Edhi Sunarso

Dirgantara Monument (Indonesian: Monumen Patung Dirgantara), also known as Gatot Kaca Monument after the Javanese wayang figure, is a monument located in Jakarta, Indonesia. It is also known as Tugu Pancoran, after tugu a word for statue and pedestal, and the South Jakarta subdistrict of Pancoran, where it is located. The monument was commissioned by President Sukarno in 1964 as a tribute to the Indonesian Air Force and early Indonesian aviators who flew against the Dutch to achieve independence.

== Description ==
The Dirgantara Monument is situated at the junction of Jalan Gatot Subroto and Jalan M.T. Haryono and looks along Jalan Dr. Supomo into the suburb of Tebet. Tebet itself was developed from the early 1960s to house people displaced by the construction of the Gelora Bung Karno sports complex at Senayan.

The monument stands on top of a 27-meter high arched socle. The statue on top of the socle is an 11-meter bronze sculpture of a man and weighs 11 tons. It depicts the manusia angkasa, "space man", symbolizing the conquest of space by the nation.

== History ==
The idea for the construction of the monument came from President Sukarno who wanted a statue as a homage to Indonesian airways, and to the conquest of space. The chosen location was in front of the headquarters of the Indonesian Air Force, which was designed by Friedrich Silaban, but which has since been demolished and replaced by the Wisma Aldiron Dirgantara office complex. The location was strategic because it was also the gateway to Jakarta for visitors coming from Halim Perdanakusuma Airport.

The statue was designed by Edhi Sunarso around 1964–1965 with the help of the Arca family of Yogyakarta, while the casting process was carried out by the Decorative Bronze Art Bronze Sculpture of Yogyakarta led by I Gardono. The development process was overseen by PN Hutama Karya with Ir. Sutami as the executing architect. Sukarno partly funded the construction of this monument from the sale of his private car.

Unlike many monuments of the 1960s; the construction of the Dirgantara Monument took a long time to complete due to the September 1965 coup attempt and its aftermath. As a result, the monument was left without its bronze sculpture for more than a year. Rumors spread that the monument depicted the device to extract eyes said to have been used by the Communist Party of Indonesia during the alleged torture of the kidnapped generals, although this was repeatedly denied by President Sukarno. The bronze sculpture was assembled section by section (each section of the bronze sculpture weighted about 1 ton) until it was finally completed at the end of 1966, completing the Dirgantara Monument.

During the late 90s, two elevated toll roads were constructed, flanking the monument in front and at the back.

== In popular culture ==
Several notable nicknames for the Dirgantara Monument are "Truper" (a corruption of "trooper"), as some people think the statue depicts a parachutist, with the ragged clothes depicting the remnants of a parachute. Because the supporting plinth is shaped like number seven, it is also known as the "Seven-up Man". The Dutch in Jakarta called it "Ard Schenk", because the posture of the arms are reminiscent of a skater.

== See also ==
Other statues constructed by Edhi Sunarso in the 1960s:

- Selamat Datang Monument
- West Irian Liberation Monument

== Cited works ==
- Dinas Museum & Sejarah (1982). Sejarah singkat patung-patung dan monument di Jakarta [Short history of statues and monuments in Jakarta] (in Indonesian). Jakarta: Pemerintah Daerah Khusus Ibu-Kota Jakarta.
- Lecrec, Jacques (1993). "3. Mirrors and the lighthouse: A search for meaning in the monuments and great works of Sukarno's Jakarta, 1960-1966". In Nas, Peter J.M. (ed.). Urban Symbolism. BRILL. ISBN 9789004098558.
- Merrillees, Scott (2015). Jakarta: Portraits of a Capital 1950-1980. Jakarta: Equinox Publishing. ISBN 9786028397308.
- Nas, Peter J.M. (1993). "1. Jakarta, city full of symbols: An essay in symbolic ecology". In Nas, Peter J.M. (ed.). Urban Symbolism. BRILL. ISBN 9789004098558.
