= Selamat Datang Monument =

- Monumen Selamat Datang
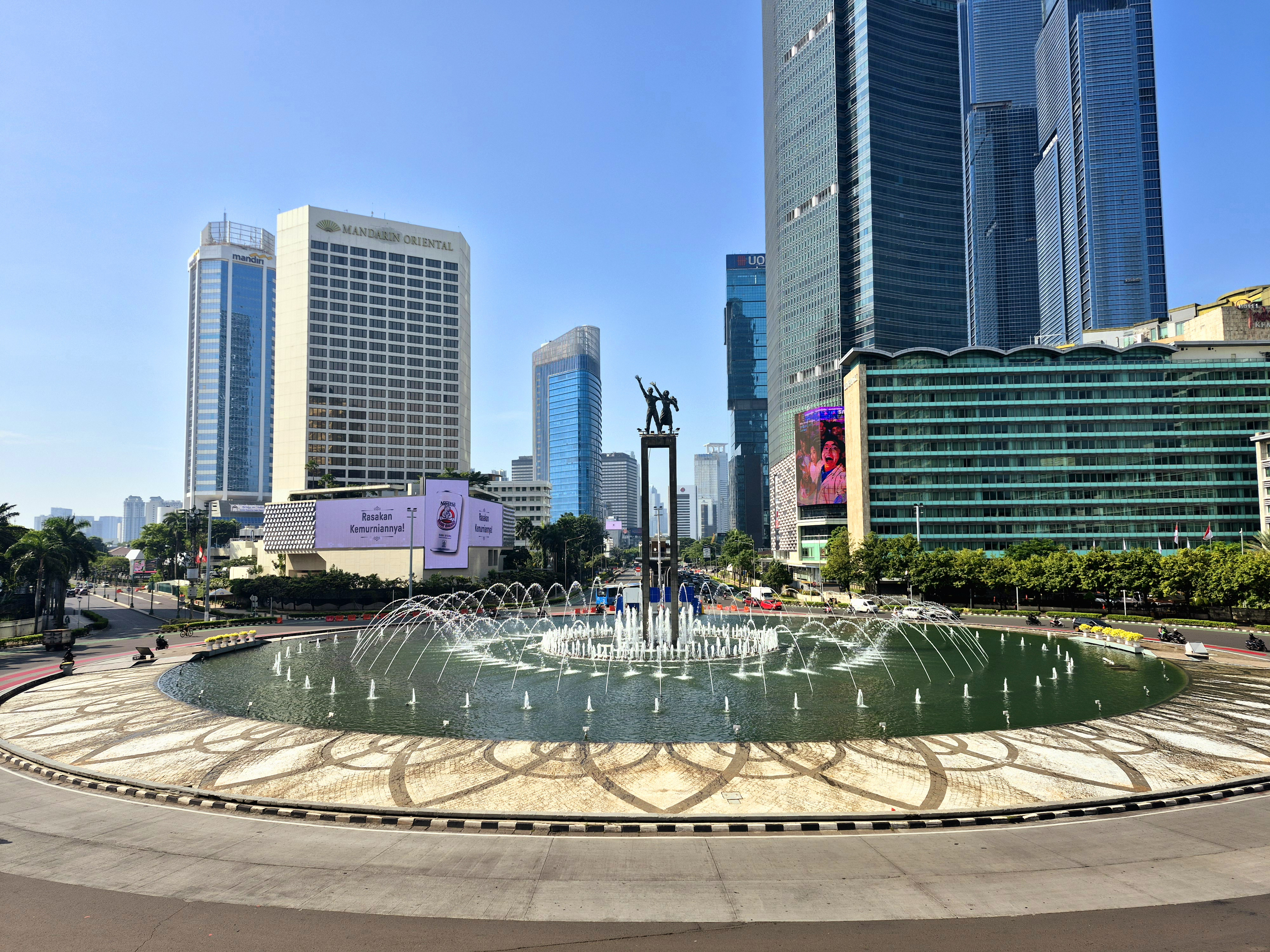
- Selamat Datang Monument in 2025

General information
- Type: Statue
- Location: Bundaran Hotel Indonesia, Jakarta, Indonesia
- Coordinates: 6°11′41.9244″S 106°49′22.9764″E
- Inaugurated: 17 August 1961
- Operator: Government of Jakarta

Height
- Height: 10 m

Design and construction
- Architects: Henk Ngantung; Edhi Sunarso; Trubus Sudarsono

The Selamat Datang Monument (Indonesian: Monumen Selamat Datang, lit. 'Welcome Monument'), also known as Monumen Bundaran HI or Monumen Bunderan HI, is a monument located in Central Jakarta, Indonesia, located at the centre of the Bundaran Hotel Indonesia traffic circle. Completed in 1962 by sculptor Edhi Sunarso, the Selamat Datang Monument is one of the historic landmarks of Jakarta.

== History and design ==
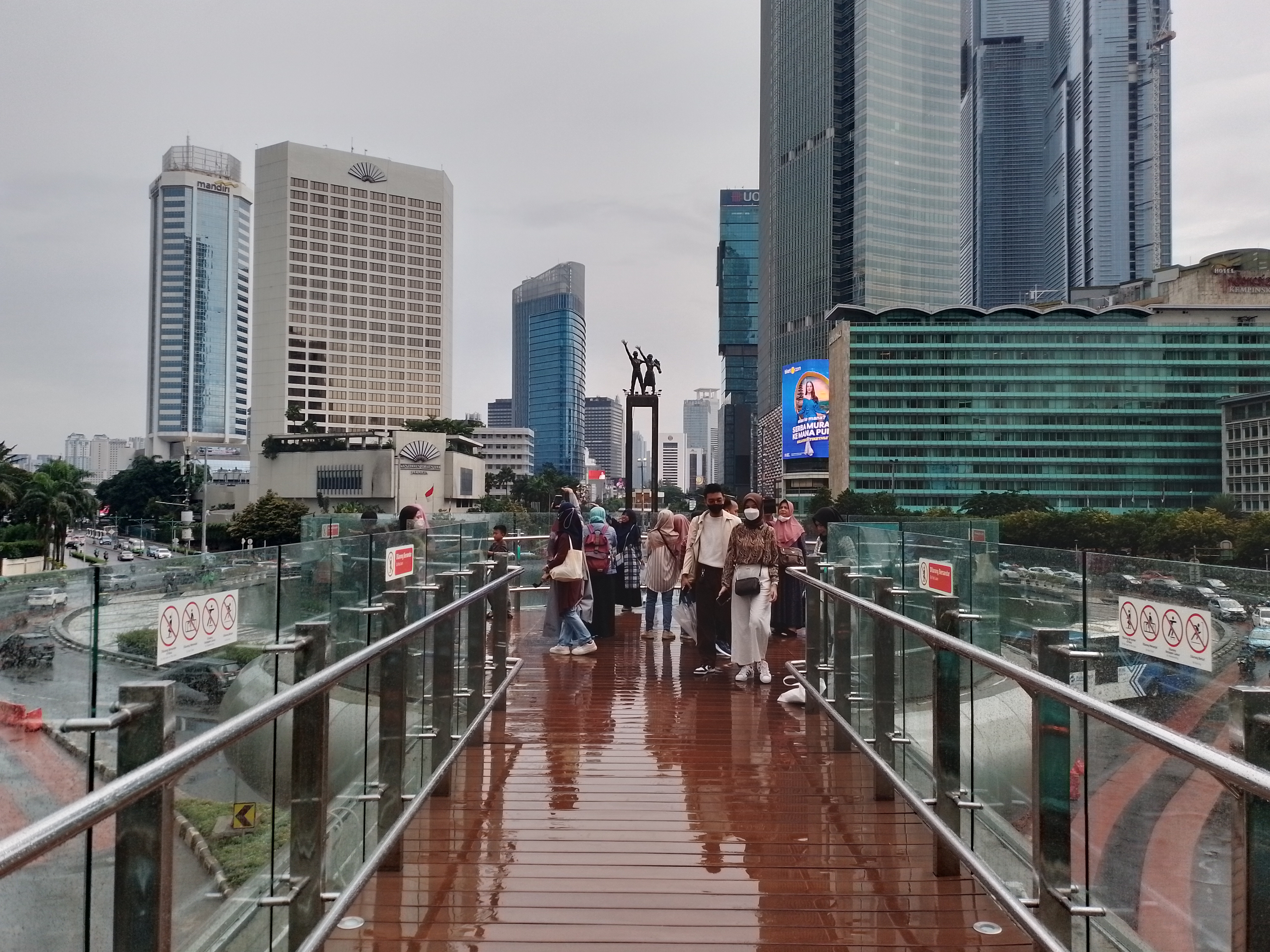
View from the second floor of Bundaran HI Astra (Transjakarta)

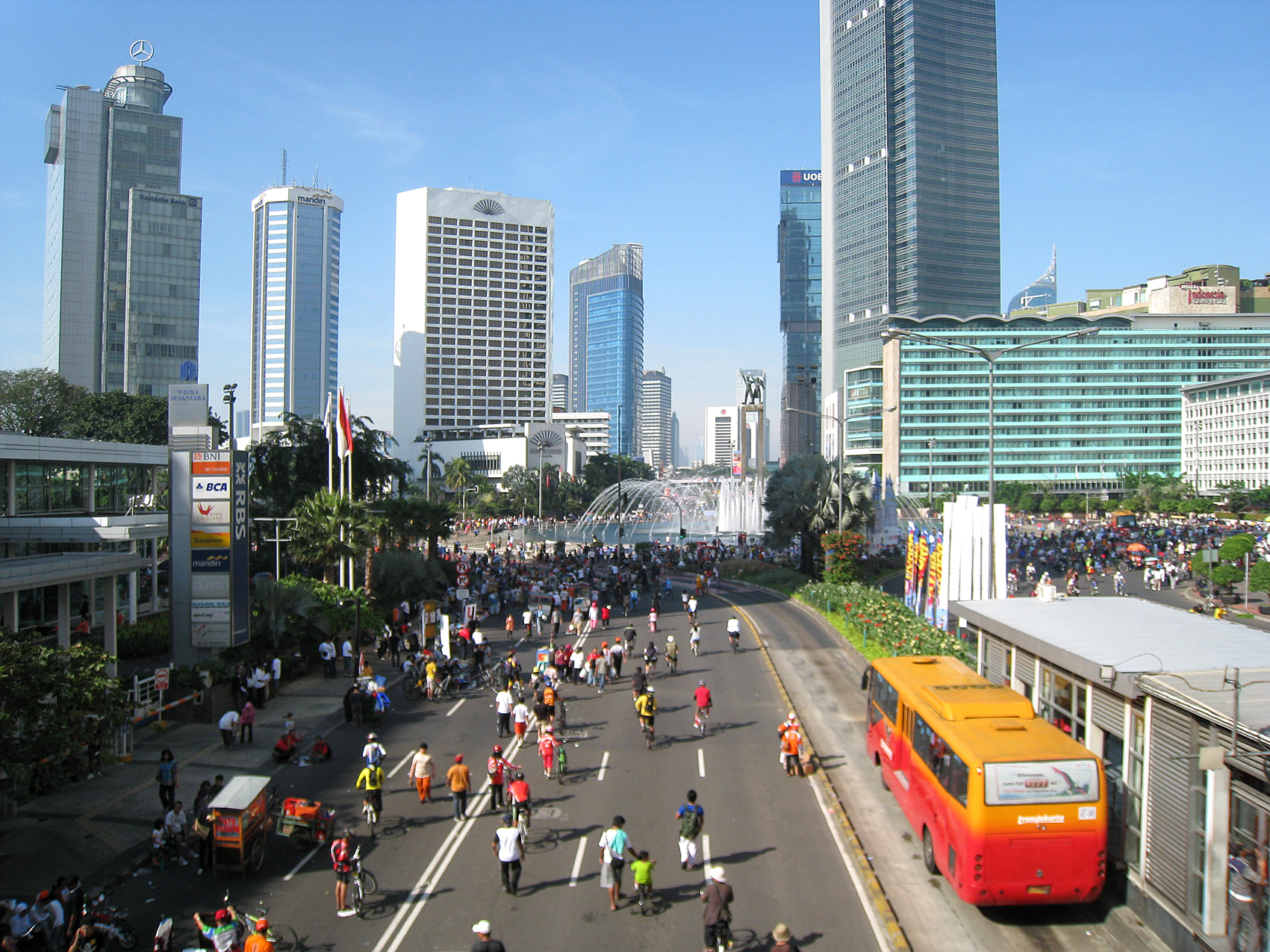
Selamat Datang Monument during car-free day, 2010

During the 1960s, President Sukarno ordered several constructions and city beautification projects in preparation for the Asian Games IV. These activities included the construction of the Ikada Sport Complex (in what is now Gelora Bung Karno Sport Complex) and several statues, including the Selamat Datang Monument, designated as Tugu Selamat Datang.

The design of the statue was sketched by Henk Ngantung, at that time the vice governor of Jakarta. The sculpting of the statue was done by sculptor Edhi Sunarso. Trubus Sudarsono, a close advisor to Sukarno on fine arts matters, was the coordinator of the project. The statue depicts two bronze statues of a man and a woman, waving in a welcoming gesture. The woman holds a flower bouquet in her left hand. The design evokes similarity with the style of Soviet sculptor Vera Mukhina and was heavy with socialist realism. Sukarno was said to have contributed to the design of the statue. Henk Ngantung wrote that initially the Welcome Monument was to be named "Indonesian people greet their future".

The two figures of the Welcome Monument are five metres from head to toe, or seven metres from the tip of the raised arm to toe. The two figures stand atop a pedestal. In total, the monument is about thirty meters above the ground. The Selamat Datang Monument symbolizes the openness of the Indonesian nation to visitors to the Asian Games IV.

The construction of the statue was started on 17 August 1961. During the construction of the statue, Edhi Sunarso was visited by Sukarno, US Ambassador to Indonesia Howard P. Jones, and other ministers in his studio.

In October 2022, the Jakarta Government began a revitalization project for the Bundaran HI Astra (Transjakarta), which made the bus stop have two floors that resemble a cruise ship, with a curved platform and a facade pattern inspired by batik. The new artistic design was created by Kuncara Wicaksana. The building has toilets, prayer rooms, commercial and passenger waiting areas, and an observation deck overlooking the Welcome Monument on the south side on the second floor.

== Bundaran Hotel Indonesia ==
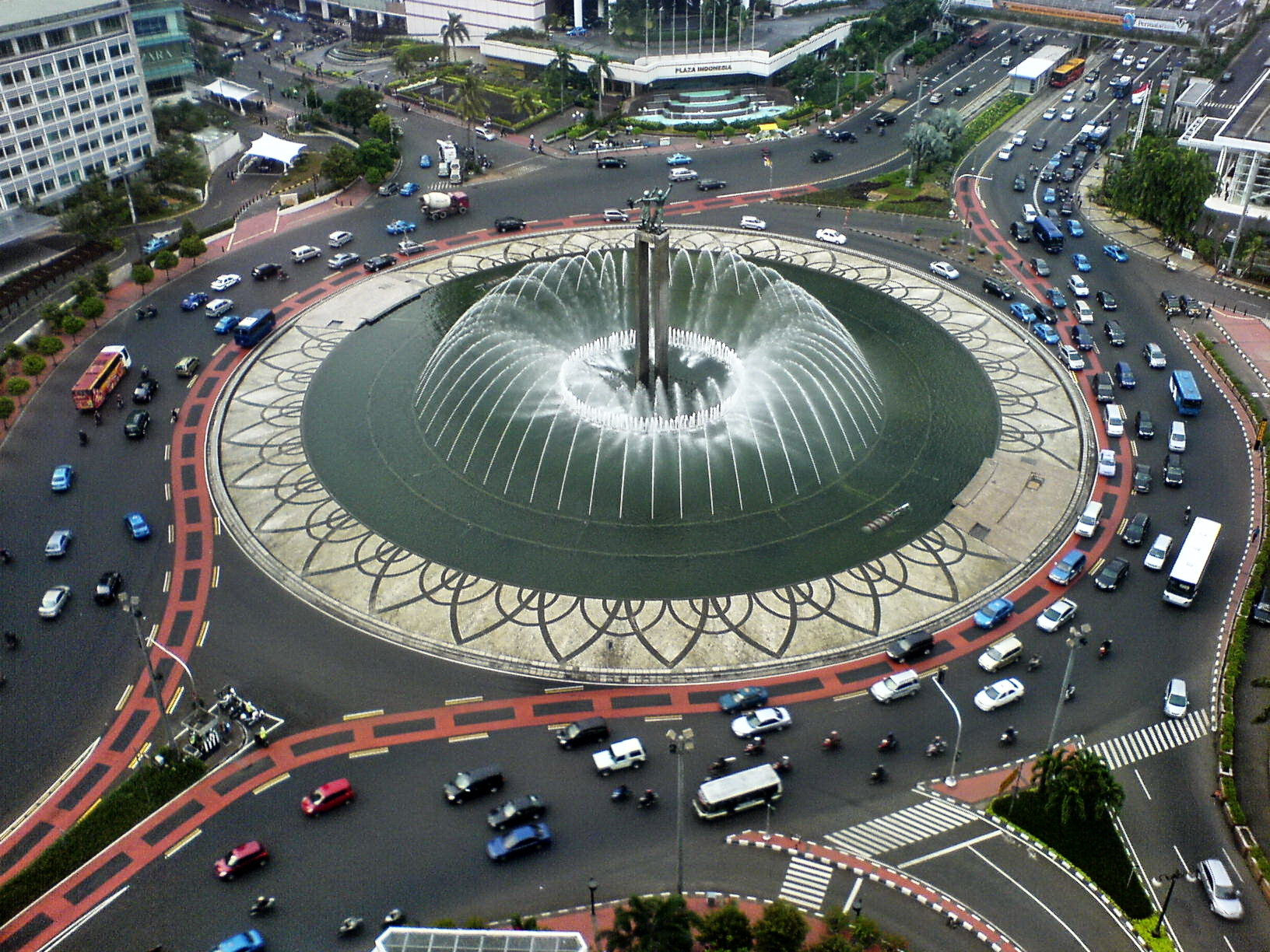
Selamat Datang Monument at the center of the Bundaran Hotel Indonesia fountain

The Selamat Datang Monument is located at the centre of a roundabout known as Bundaran Hotel Indonesia or Bundaran HI (Indonesian for "Hotel Indonesia Roundabout"), named because of its proximity to Hotel Indonesia. Another accepted spelling is Bunderan HI, which is closer to the Javanese and Betawi languages native to Jakarta. The roundabout is strategically located in the heart of Jakarta, right in the centre of Jakarta's main avenue, Jalan M.H. Thamrin, on its intersection with Jalan Imam Bonjol, Jalan Sutan Syahrir and Jalan Kebon Kacang. At its completion, Hotel Indonesia and its roundabout are the gateway for visitors to Jakarta. The roundabout features a round pond with fountains.

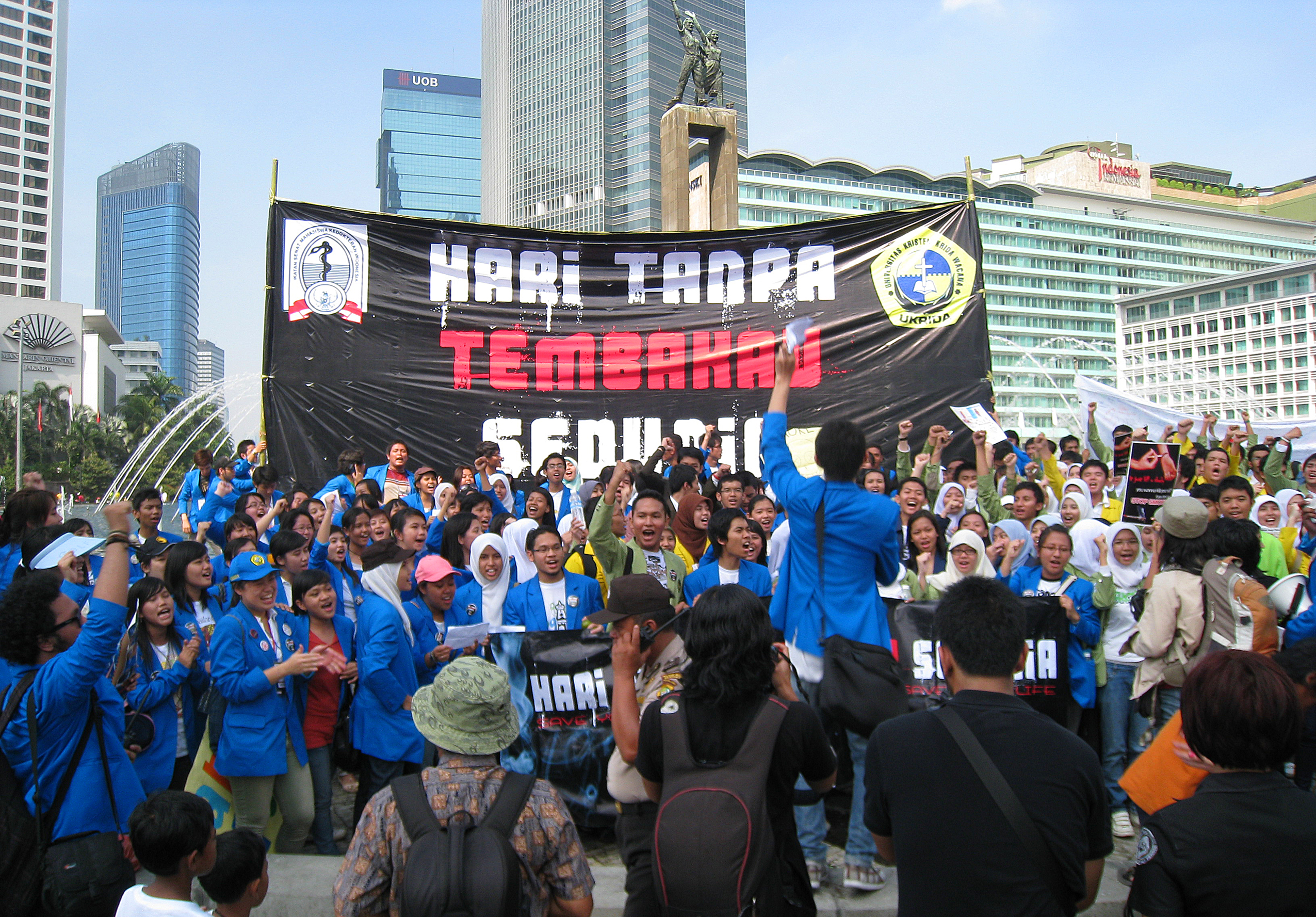
Medical students in Jakarta demonstrate against tobacco during "A Day Without Tobacco", at Bundaran Hotel Indonesia

In 2002, Bundaran Hotel Indonesia was restored by PT Jaya Konstruksi Manggala Pratama. The restoration introduced new fountains, a new pool design, and new lighting. Today, after the Reformation Era (Reformasi), the paved plaza surrounding the pond has become a popular spot for civic demonstrations. Every Sunday morning during Jakarta's Car-Free Days, the roundabout is filled with people doing jogging, bicycling, and street photography, as well as temporary street vendors.

== See also ==
- Welcome Rotonda - a similar traffic circle and monument in Quezon City, Philippines

Other statues constructed by Edhi Sunarso in the 1960s:

- West Irian Liberation Monument
- Dirgantara Monument

== Cited works ==
- Dinas Museum dan Sejarah (1982). Sejarah Singkat Patung-patung dan Monumen di Jakarta [Short history of statues and monuments in Jakarta] (in Indonesian). Jakarta: Pemerintah DKI Jakarta.
- Lecrec, Jacques (1993). "3. Mirrors and the lighthouse: A search for meaning in the monuments and great works of Sukarno's Jakarta, 1960-1966". In Nas, Peter J.M. (ed.). Urban Symbolism. BRILL. ISBN 9789004098558.
