= Dukuh Atas TOD =

Transit-oriented development area in Jakarta, Indonesia

Coordinates: 6.201917°S 106.820913°E

Dukuh Atas TOD Kawasan Berorientasi Transit Dukuh Atas
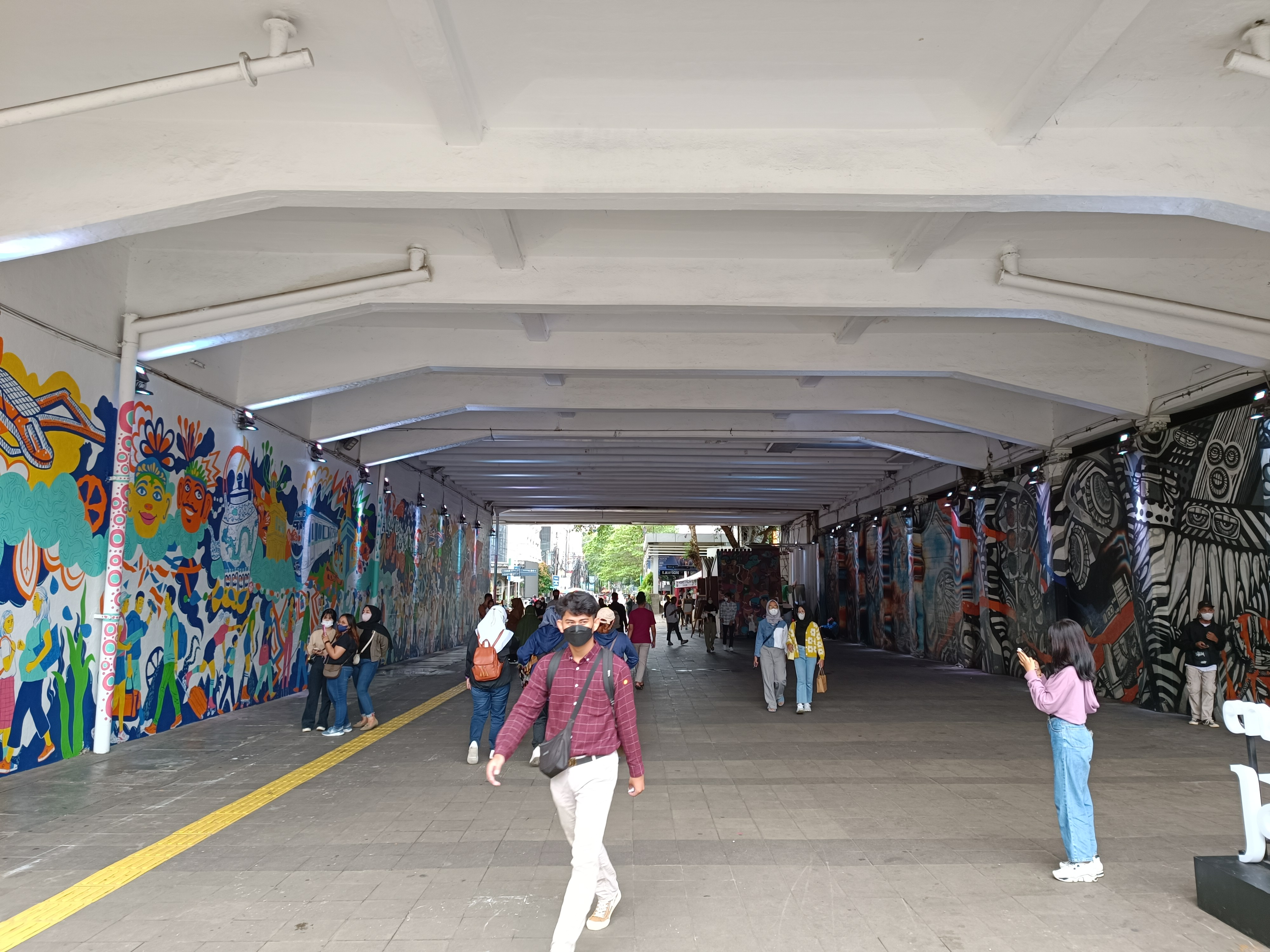
- The Kendal pedestrian tunnel which connects the MRT station, airport rail link station, and commuter rail station. It was previously passed by motorized vehicle traffic, until it was closed in 2019.

General information
- Location: Kebon Melati, Tanah Abang; Menteng, Menteng; Karet Tengsin, Tanah Abang; Central Jakarta; Setiabudi, Setiabudi; South Jakarta; Indonesia
- Operator: PT Moda Integrasi Transportasi Jabodetabek (MITJ)
- Connections: Rail-based: North–South Line; Soetta Line; Cikarang Loop Line; Cibubur Line; Bekasi Line; Bus-based: Corridor 1; Corridor 4; Corridor 6

Construction
- Structure type: Ground

Key dates
- 2019: Commenced operations
Location

Dukuh Atas TOD (Indonesian: Kawasan Berorientasi Transit Dukuh Atas or KBT Dukuh Atas) is a transit-oriented development area between Central Jakarta and South Jakarta, Indonesia. This is built as part of constructing several other transit oriented development across Jakarta to facilitate commuters to transfer between different mode of public transportation.

The development includes Dukuh Atas BNI station of Jakarta MRT, Sudirman station of KRL Commuterline, BNI City of Airport Rail Link, Dukuh Atas BNI station of Jabodebek LRT, and TransJakarta bus services. It spreads from Jl. Kendal beside Sudirman station in Central Jakarta through underpass to Jl. Blora and Jl. Tanjung Karang. The area has been designated as the main transit point for Central Jakarta and South Jakarta.

== History ==
The name Dukuh Atas (lit. 'Upper Dukuh') is thought to have come from the duku fruit plantation that once grew around the area. This area was also a trading place for duku fruit during its time. The village named Dukuh was then separated according to location, namely Dukuh Atas which was located higher and another area called Dukuh Bawah (lit. 'Lower Dukuh'). Dukuh Bawah itself is now included in the Setiabudi Village (Kelurahan), Setiabudi District, South Jakarta.

Dukuh Atas has long been Jakarta's nightlife area serving the needs of the upper middle class area since the 1960s. A number of bars and nightclubs line this area. Apart from that, there is also a street vendor area which is usually a place for lunch for workers from offices located nearby.

== Developments ==
There is a park on the western slope of Jalan Jenderal Sudirman down to Jl. Tanjung Karang, under which Dukuh Atas BNI station of Jakarta MRT is located. From the Dukuh Atas BNI MRT station point, a 700 meters pedestrian route connects Kendal Road to Blora street. There is also a 20-story building, named the Dukuh Atas Transport Hub, that will house the MRT office and other facilities. Part of Blora and Kendal streets at the front of Sudirman railway station has been permanently closed from motorized vehicle traffic and converted into a wide pedestrian corridor. Traffic flow from Sudirman to Latuharhary are diverted to Juana and Pati streets, where the transport hub building is located. Two Transjakarta feeder routes have been modified to serve the transport hub.

On the south side of the TOD, there is the Dukuh Atas Cultural Spot Park which was restored and inaugurated in 2019. This park also functions as a link for the pedestrian path on the east side of Jalan Jenderal Sudirman and the Dukuh Atas 2 (now Galunggung) Transjakarta bus station. A pedestrian bridge is built to connect Dukuh Atas Bank Syariah Indonesia LRT station with the Sudirman railway station, so that it can make it easier for people to switch modes from both sides of the TOD. The bridge, named Jembatan Penyeberangan Multiguna (JPM) Dukuh Atas (Dukuh Atas Multi-Purpose Crossing Bridge) or Serambi Temu Dukuh Atas (lit. 'Dukuh Atas Rendezvous Terrace') was opened along with the inauguration of the Jabodebek LRT service on 28 August 2023. The 250-metre bridge is divided in three zones with commercial areas and it is also accessible with bicycles. The multi-purpose bridge was inaugurated on 14 September 2023, by the Minister of Transportation Budi Karya Sumadi and the Acting Governor of Jakarta Heru Budi Hartono.

Another bridge, which would be a four-quadrant "donut ring" circular skybridge is planned to seamlessly connect the two railway stations (Sudirman and BNI City), the MRT station, and the Transjakarta bus station, as well as a planned LRT station for the Jakarta LRT. It will be built above the Sudirman street and the West Flood Canal. The project construction officaly broke ground on 21 June 2026, and is expected to be completed by 2028.

== List of transportation services ==
| Type | Station | Route | Destination |
Rail-based
| Jakarta MRT | Dukuh Atas BNI | North–South Line | Lebak Bulus–Bundaran HI |
| KAI Commuter | BNI City | Cikarang Loop Line | Cikarang-Jatinegara-Manggarai-Duri-Kampung Bandan-Pasar Senen-Jatinegara-Cikarang |
| KAI Commuter | BNI City | Airport Rail Link | SHIA–Manggarai |
| Jabodebek LRT | Dukuh Atas Bank Syariah Indonesia (terminus) | Cibubur Line | Dukuh Atas BNI–Harjamukti |
| Jabodebek LRT | Dukuh Atas Bank Syariah Indonesia (terminus) | Bekasi Line | Dukuh Atas–Jati Mulya |
Bus routes
| Transjakarta | Dukuh Atas | List of Transjakarta corridors#Corridor 1 | Blok M–Kota |
| Transjakarta | Dukuh Atas | List of TransJakarta corridors#Cross-corridor routes | Ragunan–Semanggi–Balai Kota |
| Transjakarta | Galunggung | List of Transjakarta corridors#Corridor 4 | Galunggung–Pulo Gadung |
| Transjakarta | Galunggung | List of TransJakarta corridors#Corridor 6 | Galunggung–Ragunan |
| Transjakarta | Galunggung | (non-BRT) | Galunggung–Bekasi |
| Transjakarta | Dukuh Atas | (non-BRT) | Palmerah Station–Tosari |
| Transjakarta | N/A | (Metrotrans) | Senen–Blok M |
| Transjakarta | N/A | (Minitrans) | Dukuh Atas–Kota Kasablanka via Rasuna Epicentrum Kuningan |
| Transjakarta | N/A | (non-BRT) | Pasar Minggu– Tanah Abang Station |
| Transjakarta | N/A | (Royaltrans) | Cibubur Junction–Balai Kota |
| JR Connexion | N/A | Perum DAMRI | Cibinong City Mall–CityWalk Gajah Mada |
| JR Connexion | N/A | Perum DAMRI | Tamansari Persada–Stasiun Juanda |
| JR Connexion | N/A | Perum DAMRI | Stasiun Bogor–Stasiun Juanda |
| JR Connexion | N/A | Perum DAMRI | Sentul City–Stasiun Juanda |
| JR Connexion | N/A | Perum DAMRI | Sawangan, Depok–Stasiun Juanda |
| JR Connexion | N/A | Perum DAMRI | Podomoro Golf View–CityWalk Gajah Mada |
| JR Connexion | N/A | Perum DAMRI | Grand Wisata Bekasi–CityWalk Gajah Mada |
| JR Connexion | N/A | Perum DAMRI | Grand Dhika City Bekasi Timur–Museum Nasional |
| JR Connexion | N/A | Perum DAMRI | Grand Dhika City Bekasi Timur–CityWalk Gajah Mada |
| JR Connexion | N/A | Perum DAMRI | Mega City Bekasi–Museum Nasional |
| JR Connexion | N/A | Perum DAMRI | Kemang Pratama–Gambir |
| JR Connexion | N/A | Lippo Village | Maxx Box Lippo Village–Atma Jaya University Jakarta |
| JR Connexion | N/A | Summarecon Serpong | Summarecon Mall Serpong–Atma Jaya University Jakarta |
| JR Connexion | N/A | Metro Garden Apartement | Metro Garden Apartement–Museum Nasional |
| JR Connexion | N/A | Sinar Jaya | Grand Wisata Bekasi–Tanah Abang |
| Transjabodetabek Business Class | N/A | x2 | Terminal Pondok Cabe–Terminal Pasar Senen (via Sudirman–R.S. Fatmawati) |
| Transjabodetabek Regular Class | N/A | BJ12 (AC70A-Mayasari Bakti) | Terminal Cileungsi-Tanah Abang |
| Transjabodetabek Regular Class | N/A | BJ15 (Sinar Jaya) | Ciawi–Tanah Abang |
| Transjabodetabek Regular Class | N/A | BkJ3 (AC52-Mayasari Bakti) | Terminal Bekasi–Tanah Abang |
| Transjabodetabek Regular Class | N/A | BkJ3A (AC52A-Mayasari Bakti) | Jatiasih–Tanah Abang |
| Mayasari Bakti | N/A | AC70 | Tanah Abang–Kampung Rambutan |

== See also ==
- Transport in Jakarta
- CSW-ASEAN TOD
