= Kuningan LRT station =

Railway station in South Jakarta, Indonesia

CB04 BK04 Kuningan
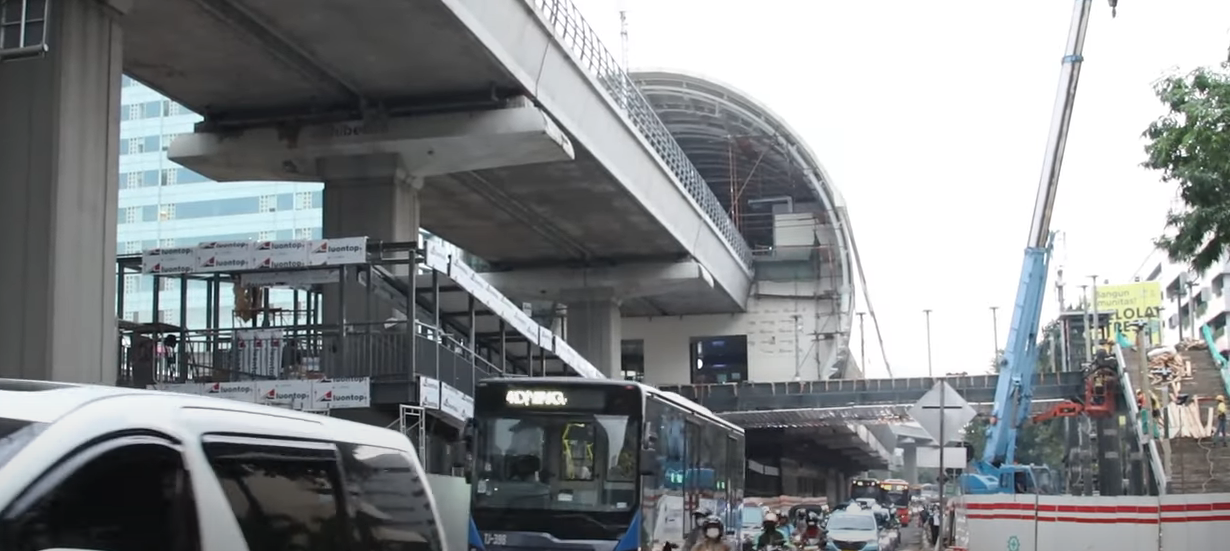
- Kuningan LRT Station during construction.

General information
- Location: Jalan H.R. Rasuna Said, East Kuningan, Setiabudi, South Jakarta; Jakarta; Indonesia
- Coordinates: 6.228881°S 106.833175°E
- Elevation: +29.339 m (96.26 ft)
- System: Jabodebek LRT station
- Owner: Directorate General of Railways
- Operator: Kereta Api Indonesia
- Manager: Kereta Api Indonesia
- Transit authority: Directorate General of Transportation Integration and Multimodal (Note: Formerly known as Jabodetabek Transportation Management Agency (Indonesian: Badan Pengelola Transportasi Jabodetabek abbreviated as BPTJ))
- Lines: Cibubur Line; Bekasi Line
- Platforms: 2 side platforms
- Tracks: 2
- Train operators: Kereta Api Indonesia
- Bus operators: PT Transportasi Jakarta
- Connections: Kuningan

Construction
- Structure type: Elevated
- Parking: Unavailable
- Cycle facilities: Available
- Accessible: Available

Other information
- Station code: KUA

History
- Opened: 26 August 2023
- Opening: August 2023
- Electrified: 2019

Services
Preceding station		Following station
Rasuna Said towards Dukuh Atas BNI	Cibubur Line	Pancoran towards Harjamukti
Rasuna Said towards Dukuh Atas BNI	Bekasi Line	Pancoran towards Jati Mulya
Connecting services
Preceding		Following
Patra Kuningan towards Ragunan	Corridor 6	Rasuna Said towards Galunggung
Route map
Location
- Location within Jakarta
- Interactive map

Kuningan LRT Station is a light rapid transit station located in Jalan H.R. Rasuna Said, East Kuningan, Setiabudi, South Jakarta, Jakarta, Indonesia. The station serves the Cibubur and Bekasi lines of the Jabodebek LRT system.

== Station layout ==
2nd floor
Side platform, the doors are opened on the right side
Line 1
← (Pancoran Bank BJB)
Cibubur Line to Harjamukti,

Bekasi Line to Jati Mulya

Line 2

Cibubur Line to Dukuh Atas BNI,

Bekasi Line to Dukuh Atas BNI

(Rasuna Said) →
Side platform, the doors are opened on the right side
1st floor
Concourse
Ticket counter, ticket vending machines, fare gates, and retail kiosks.
Ground level
Street
Entrance/Exit and access to Kuningan BRT Station

== Services ==
- Cibubur Line
- Bekasi Line

== Intermodal support ==
The station is directly connected to the Transjakarta BRT and non BRT.

Public transport type	Transfer at	Route	Destination
BRT Transjakarta	Kuningan	List of TransJakarta corridors#Corridor 6	Ragunan–Galunggung

== Surrounding area ==
- Bank Mega Syariah
- Embassy of Algeria
- Ministry of Health headquarters

== Incidents ==
- On 10 May 2025, Friday afternoon, a worker at the Kuningan LRT station fell from the top of the station. The incident occurred at around 16.00.
