= Sudirman railway station =

Railway station in Indonesia

C12 Sudirman Station Stasiun Sudirman
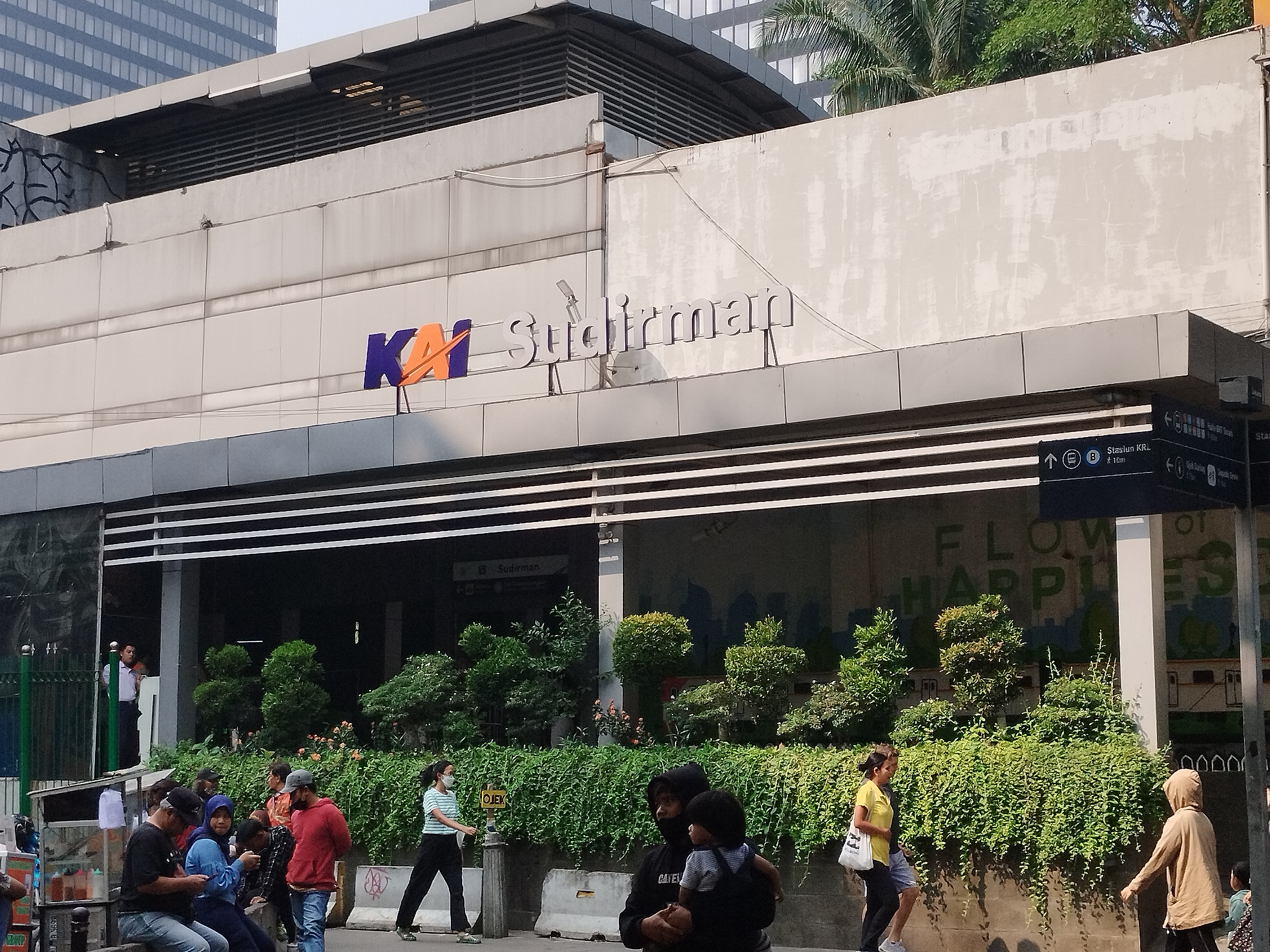
- Beside view of Sudirman station

General information
- Location: Jalan Kendal; Menteng, Menteng; Central Jakarta 10350; Indonesia
- Coordinates: 6.2024374°S 106.8233353°E
- Elevation: 5.65 m (18.5 ft)
- Owner: Kereta Api Indonesia
- Operator: KAI Commuter
- Line: Cikarang Loop Line
- Platforms: 2 side platforms
- Tracks: 2
- Connections: Dukuh Atas BNI; BNI City; Dukuh Atas Bank Syariah Indonesia; Dukuh Atas; Galunggung

Construction
- Structure type: Ground
- Parking: Not Available
- Accessible: Available

Other information
- Station code: SUD ^{formerly DKH}

History
- Opened: 5 July 1986
- Former names: Dukuh Atas Station

Passengers
- 17.000 (per day, 2022)

Services
Preceding station		Following station
BNI City towards Angke or Kampung Bandan	Cikarang Commuter Line	Manggarai towards Bekasi or Cikarang via Manggarai
Soekarno–Hatta Airport Commuter Line does not stop here
Location
- Location within Jakarta

Sudirman Station (SUD, formerly Dukuh Atas Station) is a train station of KRL Commuterline, which is located in Menteng, Central Jakarta, Indonesia. The station is named from Jalan Jenderal Sudirman, one of the main avenues in Jakarta, which crosses above the station. This station is located on the north bank of West Flood Canal. Though the station itself is operated by KAI Commuter and only serves Commuterline trains, it is a transit point for other modes of public transportation, such as the Dukuh Atas BNI MRT and LRT stations, as well as Transjakarta bus stops Dukuh Atas and Galunggung, as part of the Dukuh Atas TOD.

The station opened on 5 July 1986, and is located on the central portion of the Cikarang Loop Line which operates between Cikarang station and Kampung Bandan station. It is located between Manggarai station to the east, and BNI City station to the west. The station used to serve the original Loop Line which operates between Bogor station and Jatinegara station before its closing on 27 May 2022.

Located in Jakarta's CBD and surrounded by some of the most prominent buildings and places in Jakarta, the station is one of the most important transportation nodes in the Jabodetabek region, with the station always being crowded, especially during rush hour. Following the opening of the Dukuh Atas MRT and LRT stations and the revitalization of the surrounding station area, it is one of the busiest stations in the Commuterline network, averaging 17.000 passengers served per day as of 2022.

== History ==
Sudirman station was originally opened on 5 July 1986 under the name Dukuh Station (DKH), with the inauguration by Indonesian president Soeharto and First Lady Tien Soeharto. However, the station's name was changed in 2003 to coincide with the operation of the Sudirman Express KRL which underwent two trials in March and August 2003.

Following the implementation of electronic ticketing and the introduction of the multi-trip card (Kartu Multi Trip/KMT) in 2019, Sudirman Station, along with 5 other stations on the Commuterline network, discontinued the sale of single-trip cards (Tiket Harian Berjaminan/THB) as of 1 August 2019. It is part of an effort to cut down queueing times and streamline the flow of passengers throughout the network, and to encourage passenger transition into KMT and electronic tickets. The station would continue to accept THB tickets before it was officially discontinued on 3 September 2022.

In 2018, as part of the redevelopment plan of Dukuh Atas into a transit-oriented development, the area surrounding Sudirman Station would be revitalized to improve its connectivity with the future underground Dukuh Atas MRT station, the above ground Jabodebek LRT station of the same name, as well as surrounding Transjakarta BRT stations, with the aim of creating a new central transportation hub in Central Jakarta. This included the construction of Sudirman Baru station (later BNI City station) to the west between it and Karet station to accommodate for the Soekarno-Hatta International Airport railway link.

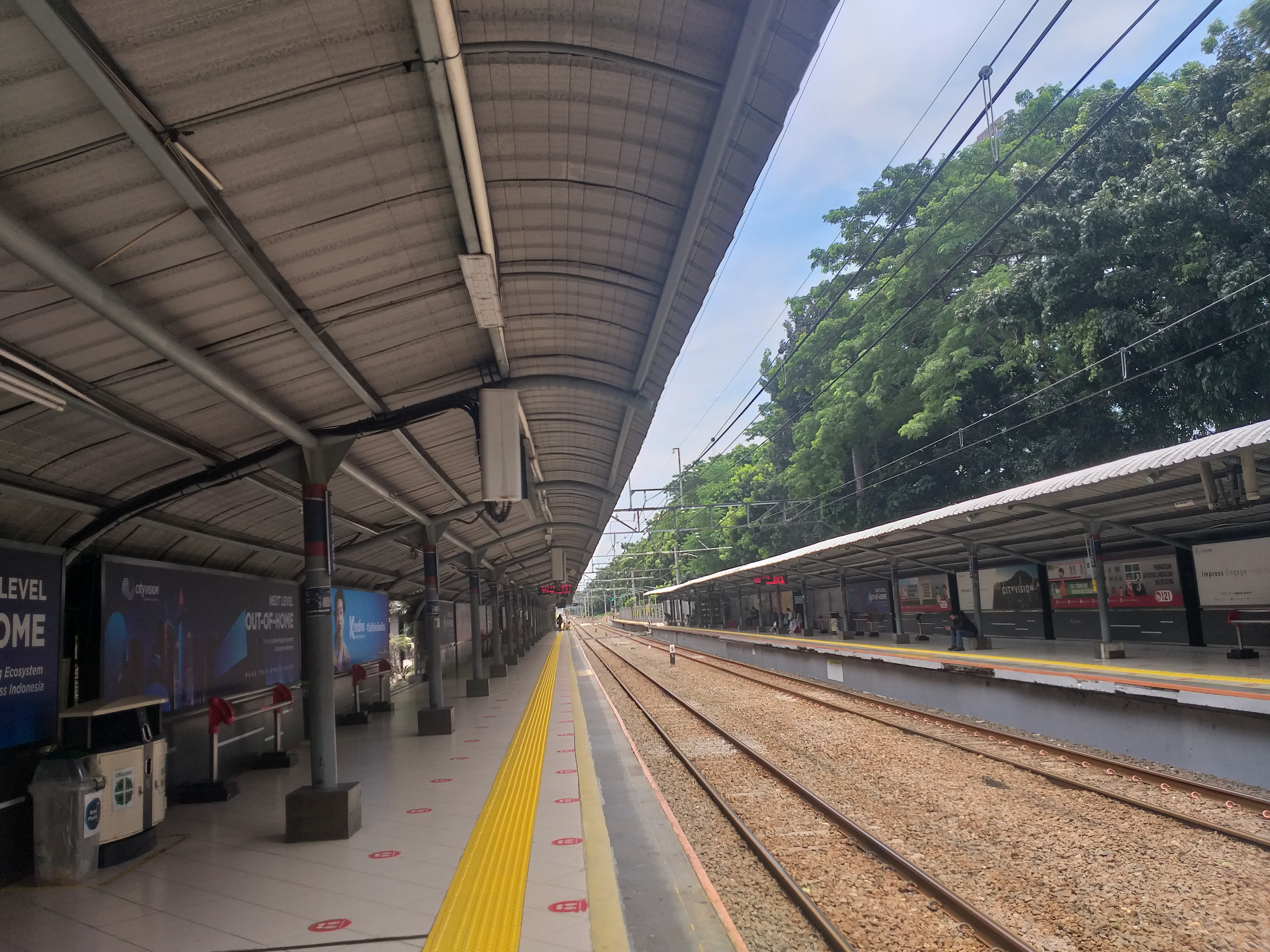
Platform 1 of the station in February 2022

Currently, Sudirman Station is connected to Dukuh Atas BNI MRT station via the Kendal tunnel, a former vehicle underpass which was converted into a pedestrian area in 2019 as part of the redevelopment project. Sudirman Station is also within walking distance to Transjakarta BRT stations Dukuh Atas, which serves corridor 1, and Galunggung, which serves corridor 4 and 6. In 2022, to alleviate crowding on the station, the nearby BNI City began serving Cikarang Loop Line trains starting 30 July 2022. On 28 August 2023, a multi-purpose crossing bridge that connects the station with the Dukuh Atas LRT station was opened to the public.

== Station layout ==
This station has two railway tracks. Both tracks are straight tracks without railroad switch.

C12
G	Main building	
Platform floor	Side platform, the doors are opened on the right side	
Platform floor	Line 1	← (BNI City) Cikarang Loop Line (clockwise loop) towards Kampung Bandan
Platform floor	Line 2	Cikarang Loop Line (counterclockwise loop) to Cikarang (Manggarai) →
Platform floor	Side platform, the doors are opened on the right side	

== Services ==
The following is a list of train services at the Sudirman Station.

=== Passenger services ===
==== Current services ====
Train line name	Last destination		Notes
Cikarang Loop Line (Half Racket)	Cikarang	Angke	via Tanah Abang
Cikarang Loop Line (Full Racket)	Cikarang	Kampung Bandan	clockwise via Tanah Abang and Duri
Cikarang Loop Line (Full Racket)	Cikarang	Kampung Bandan	counter-clockwise via Manggarai

==== Former services ====
Train line name	Last destination		Notes
Loop Line (closed on 27 May 2022)	Jatinegara	Bogor	via Tanah Abang
Loop Line (closed on 27 May 2022)	Jatinegara	Nambo	limited service

== Supporting transportation ==
Type	Station	Route	Destination
Rail-based
Jakarta MRT	Dukuh Atas BNI	North–South Line	Lebak Bulus–Bundaran HI
KAI Commuter	BNI City	Cikarang Loop Line	Cikarang-Jatinegara-Manggarai-Duri-Kampung Bandan-Pasar Senen-Jatinegara-Cikarang
KAI Commuter	BNI City	Airport Rail Link	SHIA–Manggarai
Jabodebek LRT	Dukuh Atas Bank Syariah Indonesia (terminus)	Cibubur Line	Dukuh Atas–Harjamukti
Jabodebek LRT	Dukuh Atas Bank Syariah Indonesia (terminus)	Bekasi Line	Dukuh Atas–Jati Mulya
Bus routes
Transjakarta	Dukuh Atas	List of Transjakarta corridors#Corridor 1	Blok M–Kota
Transjakarta	Dukuh Atas	List of TransJakarta corridors#Cross-corridor routes	Ragunan–Semanggi–Balai Kota
Transjakarta	Galunggung	List of Transjakarta corridors#Corridor 4	Galunggung–Pulo Gadung
Transjakarta	Galunggung	List of TransJakarta corridors#Corridor 6	Galunggung–Ragunan
Transjakarta	Galunggung	(non-BRT)	Galunggung–Bekasi
Transjakarta	Dukuh Atas	(non-BRT)	Palmerah Station–Tosari
Transjakarta	N/A	(Metrotrans)	Senen–Blok M
Transjakarta	N/A	(Minitrans)	Dukuh Atas–Kota Kasablanka via Rasuna Epicentrum Kuningan
Transjakarta	N/A	(non-BRT)	Pasar Minggu– Tanah Abang Station
Transjakarta	N/A	(Royaltrans)	Cibubur Junction–Balai Kota
JR Connexion	N/A	Perum DAMRI	Cibinong City Mall–CityWalk Gajah Mada
JR Connexion	N/A	Perum DAMRI	Tamansari Persada–Stasiun Juanda
JR Connexion	N/A	Perum DAMRI	Stasiun Bogor–Stasiun Juanda
JR Connexion	N/A	Perum DAMRI	Sentul City–Stasiun Juanda
JR Connexion	N/A	Perum DAMRI	Sawangan, Depok–Stasiun Juanda
JR Connexion	N/A	Perum DAMRI	Podomoro Golf View–CityWalk Gajah Mada
JR Connexion	N/A	Perum DAMRI	Grand Wisata Bekasi–CityWalk Gajah Mada
JR Connexion	N/A	Perum DAMRI	Grand Dhika City Bekasi Timur–Museum Nasional
JR Connexion	N/A	Perum DAMRI	Grand Dhika City Bekasi Timur–CityWalk Gajah Mada
JR Connexion	N/A	Perum DAMRI	Mega City Bekasi–Museum Nasional
JR Connexion	N/A	Perum DAMRI	Kemang Pratama–Gambir
JR Connexion	N/A	Lippo Village	Maxx Box Lippo Village–Atma Jaya University Jakarta
JR Connexion	N/A	Summarecon Serpong	Summarecon Mall Serpong–Atma Jaya University Jakarta
JR Connexion	N/A	Metro Garden Apartement	Metro Garden Apartement–Museum Nasional
JR Connexion	N/A	Sinar Jaya	Grand Wisata Bekasi–Tanah Abang
Transjabodetabek Business Class	N/A	x2	Terminal Pondok Cabe–Terminal Pasar Senen (via Sudirman–R.S. Fatmawati)
Transjabodetabek Regular Class	N/A	BJ12 (AC70A-Mayasari Bakti)	Terminal Cileungsi-Tanah Abang
Transjabodetabek Regular Class	N/A	BJ15 (Sinar Jaya)	Ciawi–Tanah Abang
Transjabodetabek Regular Class	N/A	BkJ3 (AC52-Mayasari Bakti)	Terminal Bekasi–Tanah Abang
Transjabodetabek Regular Class	N/A	BkJ3A (AC52A-Mayasari Bakti)	Jatiasih–Tanah Abang
Mayasari Bakti	N/A	AC70	Tanah Abang–Kampung Rambutan

== Places of interest ==
- Wisma 46
- Landmark Centre
- Wisma Indocement
- Menara Astra
- Shangri-La Hotel Jakarta
- BCA Tower

Preceding station	Kereta Api Indonesia	Following station
BNI City towards Tanah Abang	Jakarta Railway; THB–MRI	Manggarai; Terminus
