= Cikunir 2 LRT station =

LRT station in Indonesia

BK12 Cikunir 2
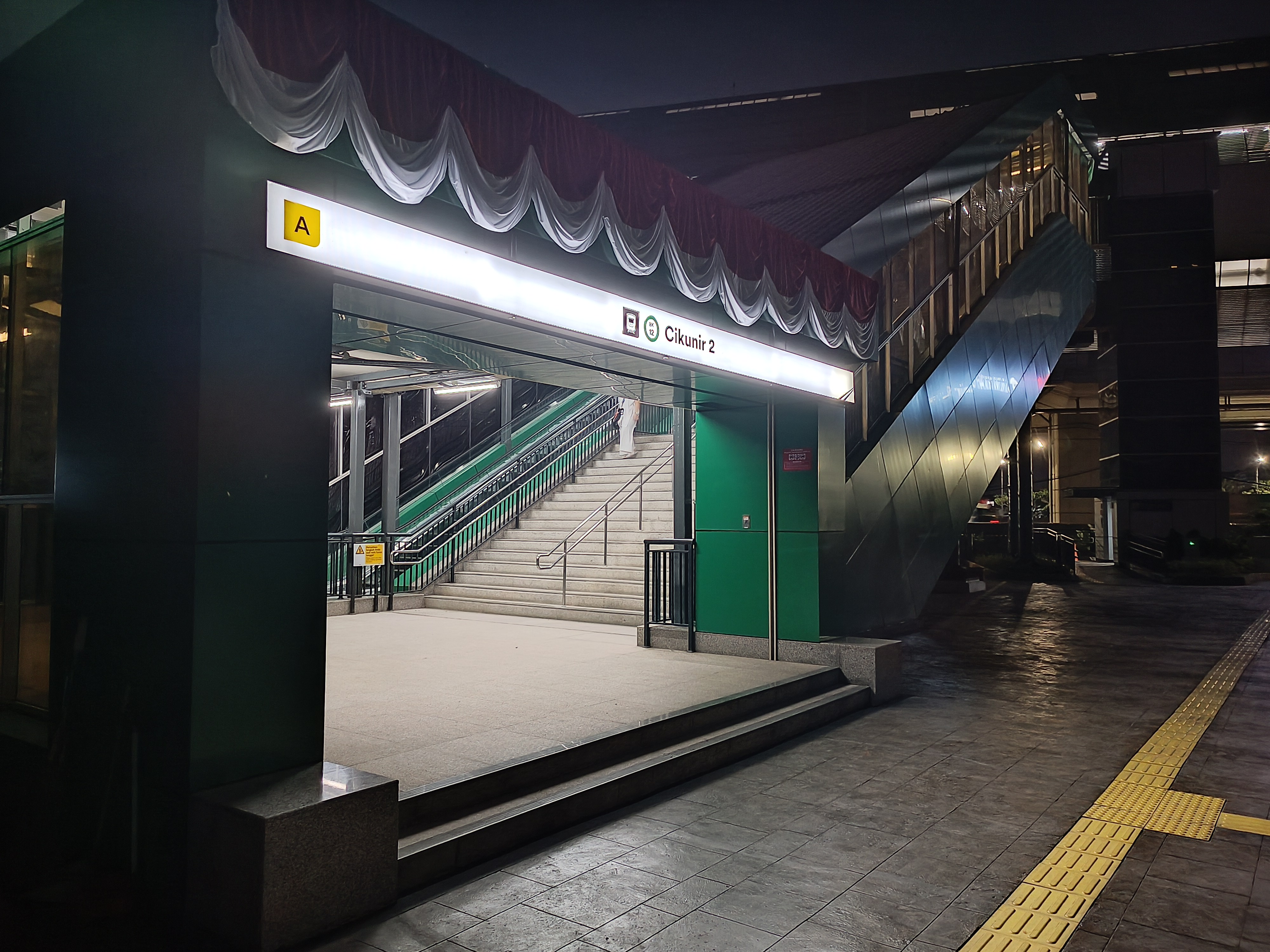
- Cikunir 2 LRT Station entrance, 2023

General information
- Location: Jalan Batu Mulia, Jakasampurna, Bekasi Barat, Bekasi, West Java, Indonesia
- Coordinates: 6.254512°S 106.963378°E
- System: Jabodebek LRT station
- Owner: Ministry of Transportation via the Directorate General of Railways
- Manager: Kereta Api Indonesia
- Line: Bekasi Line
- Platforms: 2 side platforms
- Tracks: 2

Construction
- Structure type: Elevated
- Cycle facilities: Bicycle parking
- Accessible: Yes

Other information
- Station code: CK2

History
- Opened: 28 August 2023
- Electrified: 2019

Services
Preceding station		Following station
Cikunir 1 towards Dukuh Atas BNI	Bekasi Line	Bekasi Barat towards Jati Mulya
Route map
Location

Cikunir 2 LRT Station is a light rapid transit station located in Jalan Batu Mulia, Jakasampurna, Bekasi Barat, Bekasi. The station, which is located at an altitude of +38.55 meters, serves the Bekasi line of the Jabodebek LRT system.

== Station layout ==
2nd floor	Side platform, the doors are opened on the right side
2nd floor	Line 1	← (Bekasi Barat)	Bekasi Line to Jati Mulya
2nd floor	Line 2		Bekasi Line to Dukuh Atas BNI	(Cikunir 1) →
2nd floor	Side platform, the doors are opened on the right side
1st floor	Concourse	Ticket counter, ticket vending machines, fare gates, retail kiosks
Ground level	Street	Entrance/Exit

== Services ==
Bekasi Line
