= Cikunir 1 LRT station =

Light rapid transit station in Indonesia

BK11 Cikunir 1
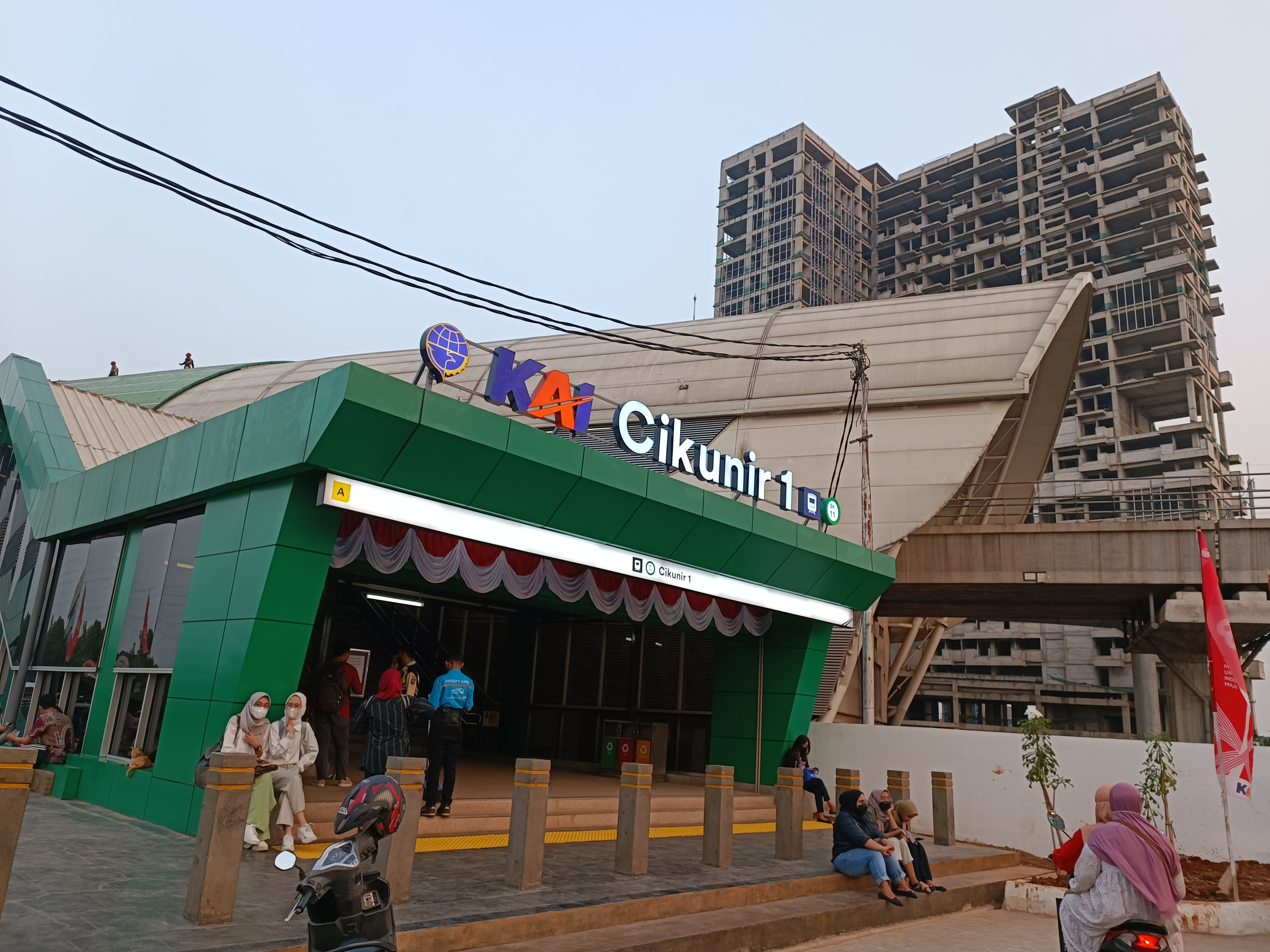
- Cikunir 1 LRT Station entrance and exit, 2023

General information
- Location: Jalan Caman Raya, Jatibening, Pondokgede, Bekasi, West Java, Indonesia
- Coordinates: 6.256240°S 106.950998°E
- System: Jabodebek LRT station
- Owner: Ministry of Transportation via the Directorate General of Railways
- Manager: Kereta Api Indonesia
- Line: Bekasi Line
- Platforms: 2 side platforms
- Tracks: 2

Construction
- Structure type: Elevated
- Cycle facilities: Bicycle parking
- Accessible: Yes

Other information
- Station code: CK1

History
- Opened: 28 August 2023
- Electrified: 2019

Services
Preceding station		Following station
Jati Bening Baru towards Dukuh Atas BNI	Bekasi Line	Cikunir 2 towards Jati Mulya
Route map
Location

Cikunir 1 LRT Station is a light rapid transit station located in Jalan Caman Raya, Jatibening, Pondokgede, Bekasi, Indonesia. The station, which is located at an altitude of +38.51 meters, serves the Bekasi line of the Jabodebek LRT system.

== Station layout ==
2nd floor	Side platform, the doors are opened on the right side
2nd floor	Line 1	← (Cikunir 2)	Bekasi Line to Jati Mulya
2nd floor	Line 2		Bekasi Line to Dukuh Atas BNI	(Jati Bening Baru) →
2nd floor	Side platform, the doors are opened on the right side
1st floor	Concourse	Ticket counter, ticket vending machines, fare gates, retail kiosks
Ground level	Street	Entrance/Exit

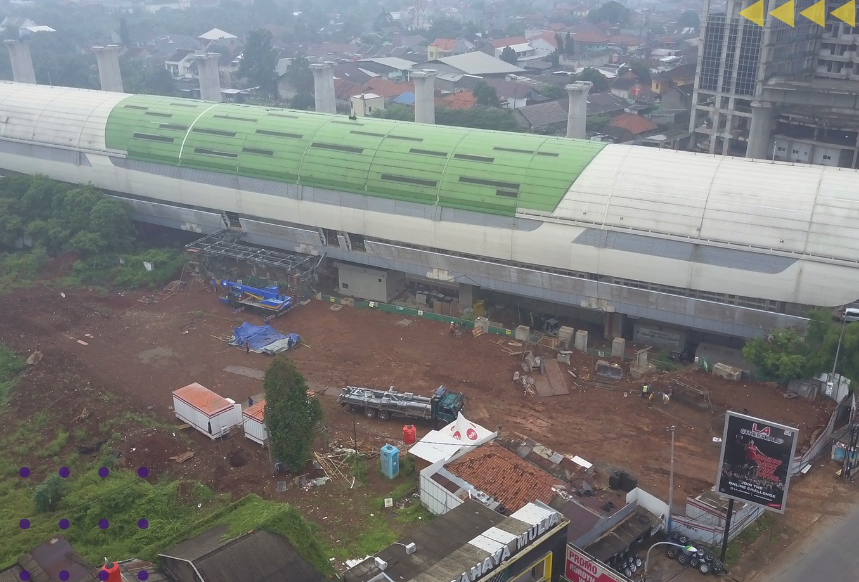
Cikunir 1 LRT station under construction

== Services ==
Bekasi Line
