= Jati Bening Baru LRT station =

Light rapid transit station in Indonesia

BK10 Jati Bening Baru
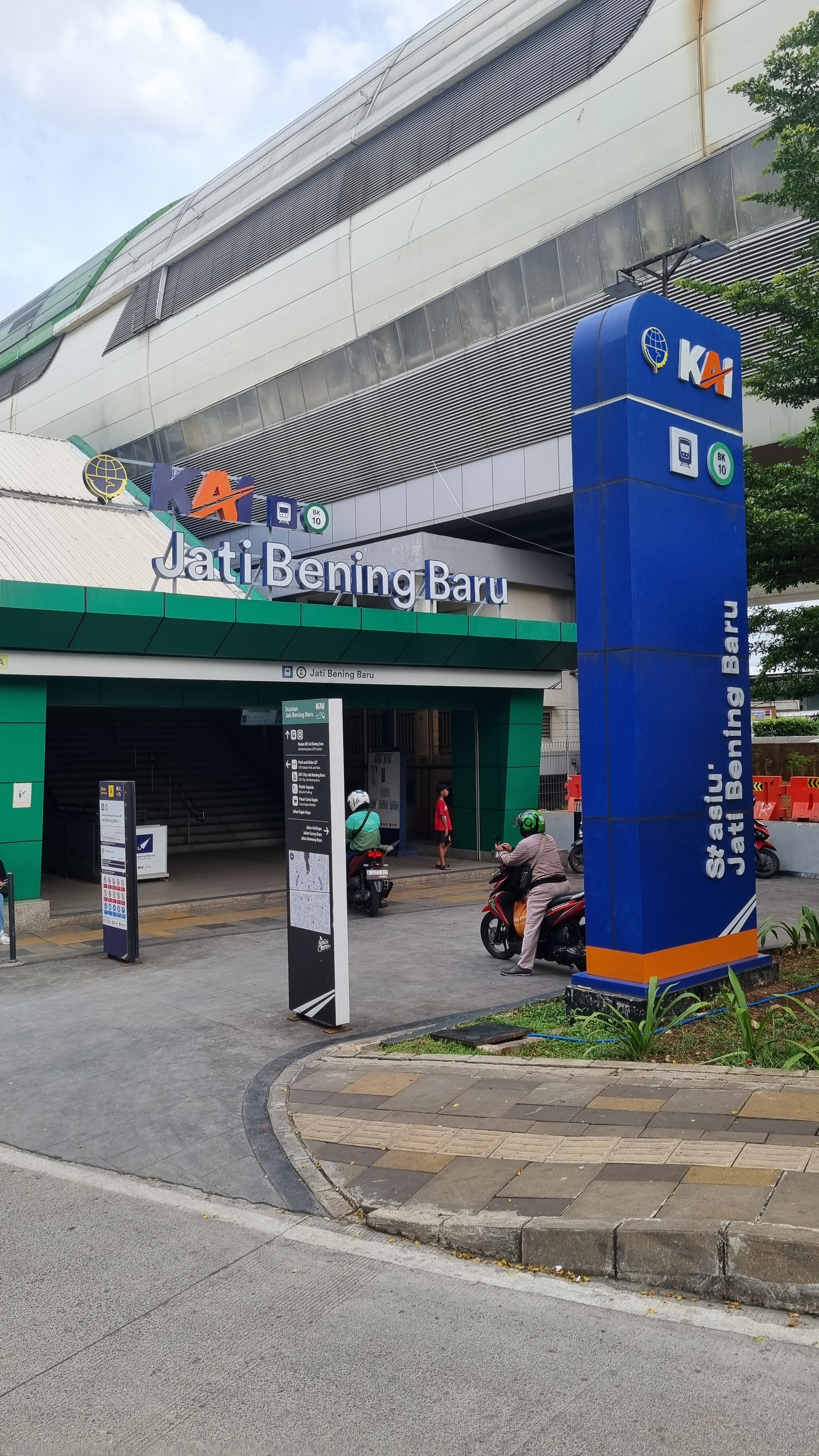
- Station entrance and exit.

General information
- Location: Jalan Kapin Raya, Jatibening Baru, Pondokgede, Bekasi, West Java, Indonesia
- Coordinates: 6.257775°S 106.927679°E
- System: Jabodebek LRT station
- Owner: Ministry of Transportation via the Directorate General of Railways
- Manager: Kereta Api Indonesia
- Line: Bekasi Line
- Platforms: 2 side platforms
- Tracks: 2

Construction
- Structure type: Elevated
- Cycle facilities: Bicycle parking
- Accessible: Yes

Other information
- Station code: JBU

History
- Opened: 28 August 2023
- Electrified: 2019

Services
Preceding station		Following station
Halim towards Dukuh Atas BNI	Bekasi Line	Cikunir 1 towards Jati Mulya
Route map
Location

Jati Bening Baru LRT Station is a light rapid transit station located in Jalan Kapin Raya, Jatibening Baru, Pondokgede, Bekasi, Indonesia. The station, which is located at an altitude of +37 meters, serves the Bekasi line of the Jabodebek LRT system. It is the line's westernmost station located in city of Bekasi.

== Station layout ==
2nd floor	Side platform, the doors are opened on the right side
2nd floor	Line 1	← (Cikunir 1)	Bekasi Line to Jati Mulya
2nd floor	Line 2		Bekasi Line to Dukuh Atas BNI	(Halim) →
2nd floor	Side platform, the doors are opened on the right side
1st floor	Concourse	Ticket counter, ticket vending machines, fare gates, retail kiosks
Ground level	Street	Entrance/Exit

== Services ==
Bekasi Line
