= Bekasi Barat LRT station =

LRT station in Indonesia

BK13 Bekasi Barat
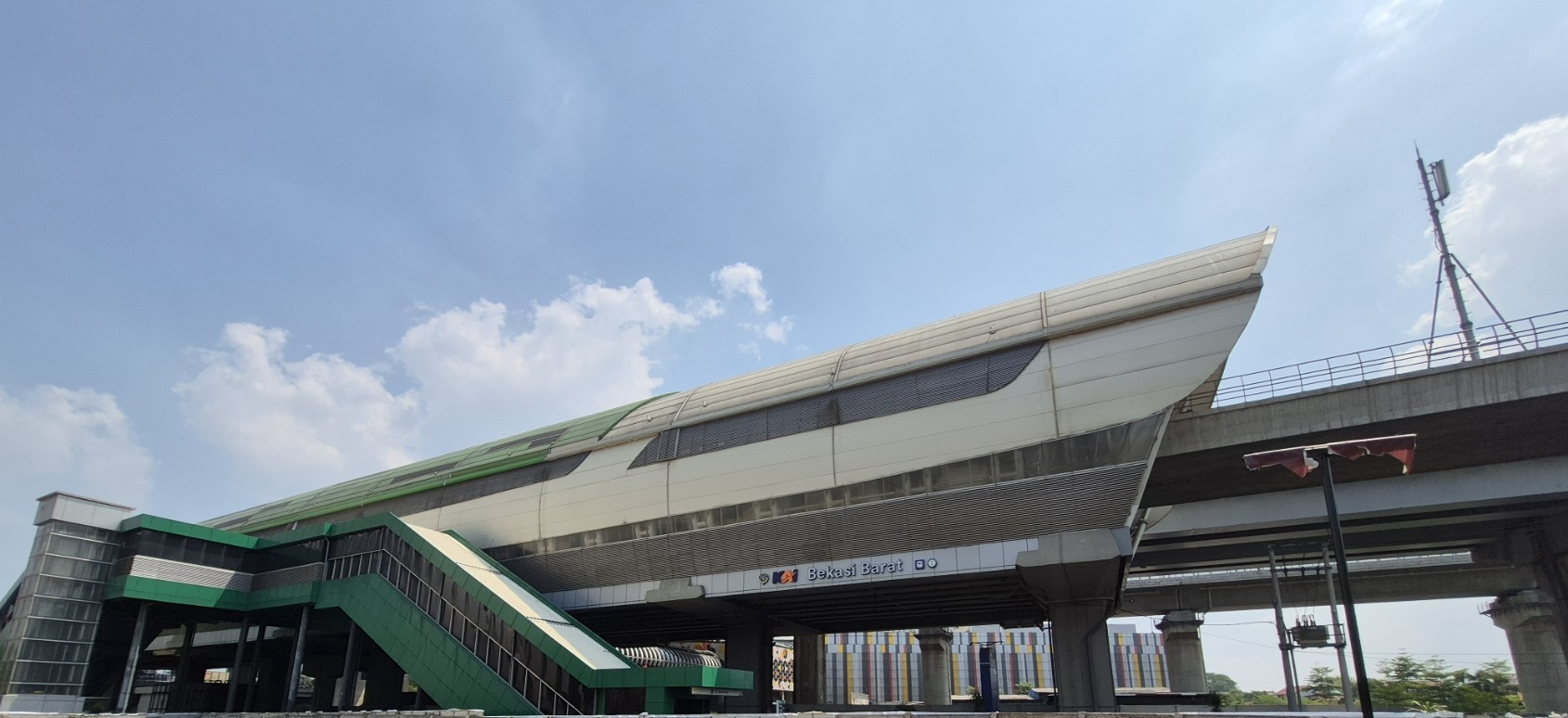
- Bekasi Barat LRT Station

General information
- Location: Jalan Jend. Ahmad Yani, Pekayon Jaya, Bekasi Selatan, Bekasi, West Java, Indonesia
- Coordinates: 6.252926°S 106.990076°E
- System: Jabodebek LRT station
- Owner: Ministry of Transportation via the Directorate General of Railways
- Manager: Kereta Api Indonesia
- Line: Bekasi Line
- Platforms: 2 side platforms
- Tracks: 2

Construction
- Structure type: Elevated
- Cycle facilities: Bicycle parking
- Accessible: Yes

Other information
- Station code: BEK

History
- Opened: 28 August 2023
- Electrified: 2019

Services
Preceding station		Following station
Cikunir 2 towards Dukuh Atas BNI	Bekasi Line	Jati Mulya Terminus
Route map
Location

Bekasi Barat LRT Station is a light rapid transit station located in Jalan Jend. Ahmad Yani, Pekayon Jaya, Bekasi Selatan, Bekasi, Indonesia. The station, which is located at an altitude of +38.57 meters, serves the Bekasi line of the Jabodebek LRT system.

== Station layout ==
2nd floor	Side platform, the doors are opened on the right side
2nd floor	Line 1	← (Jati Mulya)	Bekasi Line to Jati Mulya
2nd floor	Line 2		Bekasi Line to Dukuh Atas BNI	(Cikunir 2) →
2nd floor	Side platform, the doors are opened on the right side
1st floor	Concourse	Ticket counter, ticket vending machines, fare gates, retail kiosks
Ground level	Street	Entrance/Exit

== Services ==
Bekasi Line

== Supporting transportation ==
Type	Route	Destination
Transjakarta (Non-BRT)	B11	Summarecon Mall Bekasi–Cawang
BisKita Trans Bekasi Patriot	BK1	Summarecon Mall Bekasi–Pasar Alam Vida

== Gallery ==
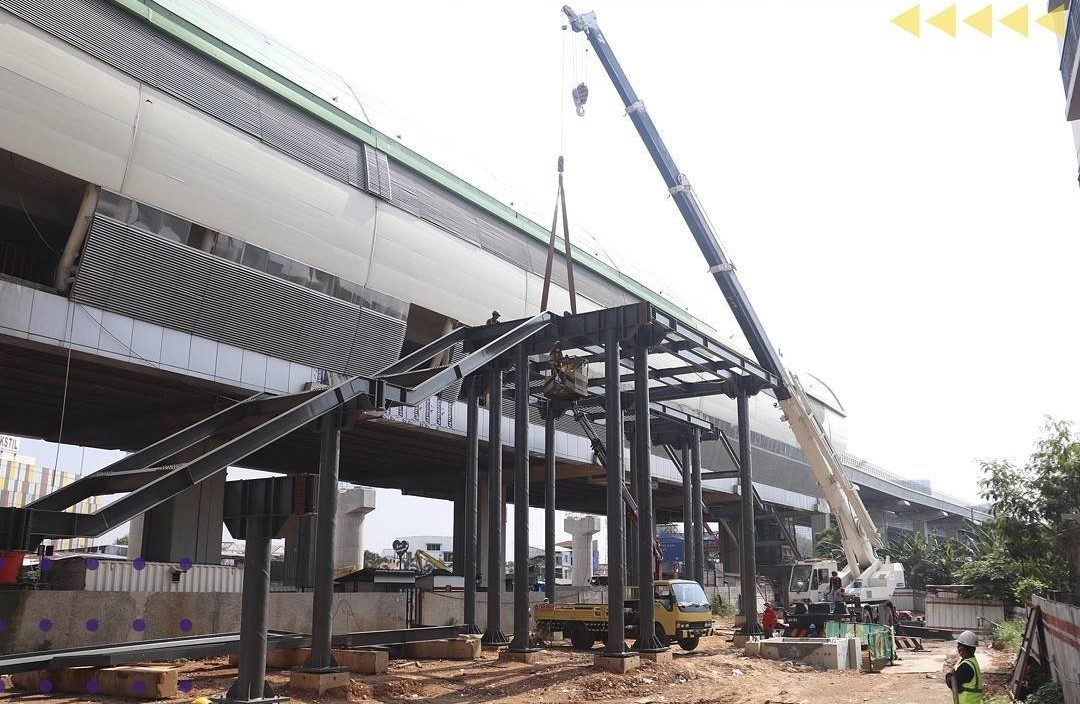
Bekasi Barat LRT Station under construction

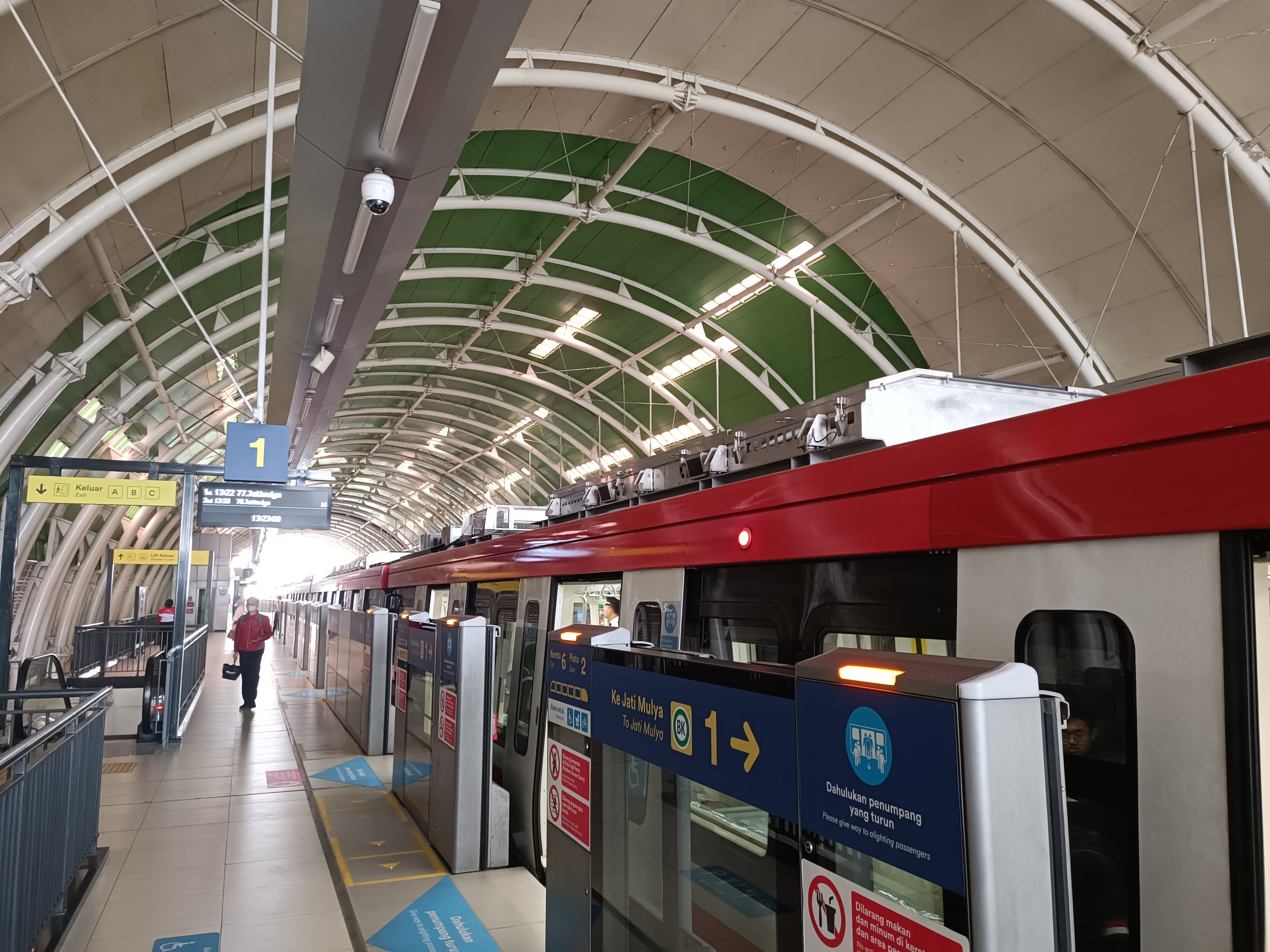
Station platform 1 towards Jati Mulya

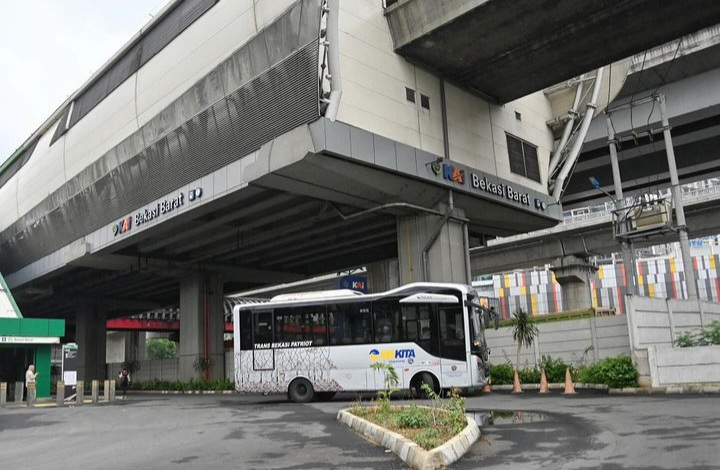
BisKita Trans Patriot stopping in front on Bekasi Barat LRT Station
