= Ck1 =

Ck1 or CK1 may refer to:

== Transportation ==
- AIDC F-CK-1 Ching-kuo, the Taiwanese fighter jet
- the F-16 variant, see F-16 Fighting Falcon variants
- Chang Kong CK-1, the radio-controlled target drone
- Cicaré CK.1, the Argentine helicopter
- the locomotive, see CK class
- Cikunir 1 LRT station, a light rail station in Jakarta, Indonesia

== Biochemistry ==
- Keratin 1
- the cytokeratin, see Type II keratin
- Casein kinase 1, a family of protein kinases

== Asteroids ==
- 1994 CK1, see 10146 Mukaitadashi
- 1993 CK1, see 20043 Ellenmacarthur
- 1989 CK1, see 4836 Medon
- 1986 CK1, see 3951 Zichichi
- 1983 CK1, see 4198 Panthera

== Other ==
- Crusader Kings I, a grand strategy computer game by Paradox Interactive
- the illicit drug cocktail, see cocaine and ketamine
- the Calvin Klein product, see Calvin Klein (company)
- Pentecost biogeographic region, see Interim Biogeographic Regionalisation for Australia
