= JBU =

JBU may refer to:

- Japan Federation of Basic Industry Workers' Unions, a Japanese trade union
- JetBlue, an American airline
- Jim Baen's Universe, an online magazine
- John Brown University
- Jati Bening Baru LRT station, a light rail station in Jakarta, Indonesia
- Jukun Takum language
- Jutland Football Association (Danish: Jydsk Boldspil-Union), now DBU Jutland
