= CK2 =

CK2 can refer to the following:

- Casein kinase 2, a term related to cell physiology
- Crusader Kings II, a grand strategy computer game by Paradox Interactive
- Cikunir 2 LRT station, a light rail station in Jakarta, Indonesia
