= Bekasi Line =

Light rapid transit line in Indonesia

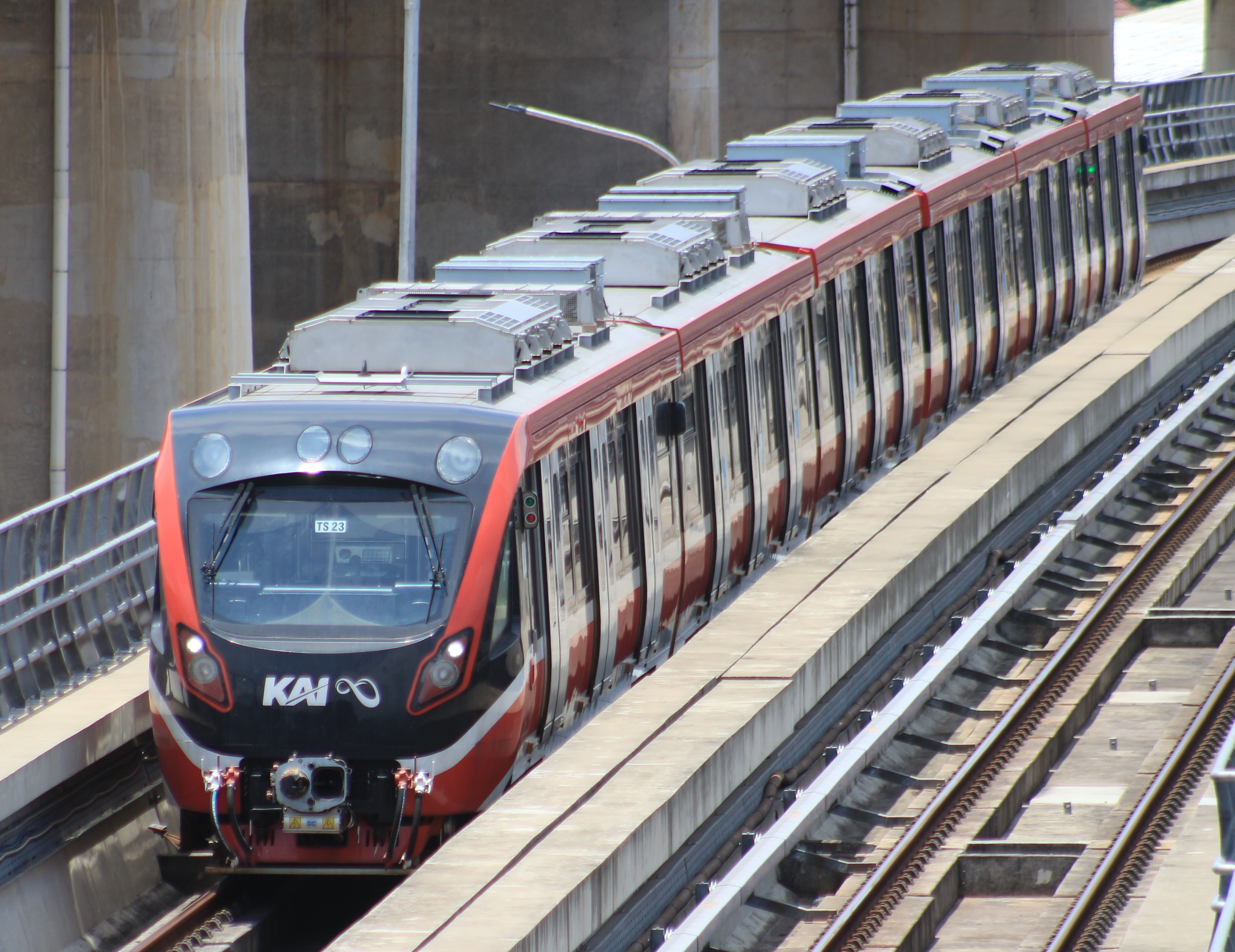
- One of the trainsets entering Halim Station

Overview
- Other name: Service line 3 of LRT Jabodebek (working name)
- Native name: Lin Bekasi
- Status: Operational
- Owner: Ministry of Transportation
- Locale: Jakarta, West Java
- Termini: Dukuh Atas BNI; Jati Mulya; Soekarno-Hatta (phase 3)
- Stations: 22 (14 operational, 8 planned)

Service
- Type: Light rapid transit
- System: Jabodebek LRT
- Services: 1
- Operator: Kereta Api Indonesia
- Depot: Jatimulya

History
- Opened: 28 August 2023; 2 years ago
- Completed: 2022

Technical
- Line length: 29.54 km (18.36 mi)
- Number of tracks: 2
- Character: Elevated
- Track gauge: 1,435 mm (4 ft 8 1/2 in) standard gauge
- Electrification: 750 V DC from third rail

The Jabodebek LRT Bekasi Line (Indonesian: LRT Jabodebek Lin Bekasi) is one of the two light rapid lines of the Jabodebek LRT which serves trips from Dukuh Atas Bank Syariah Indonesia station to Jati Mulya station. The distance traveled in this fully-elevated line is 29.54 km.

The Pancoran–Jatimulya section of the line runs along the Jakarta Inner Ring Road, Jakarta–Cikampek Toll Road, and the Jakarta–Cikampek Elevated Toll Road.

== History ==
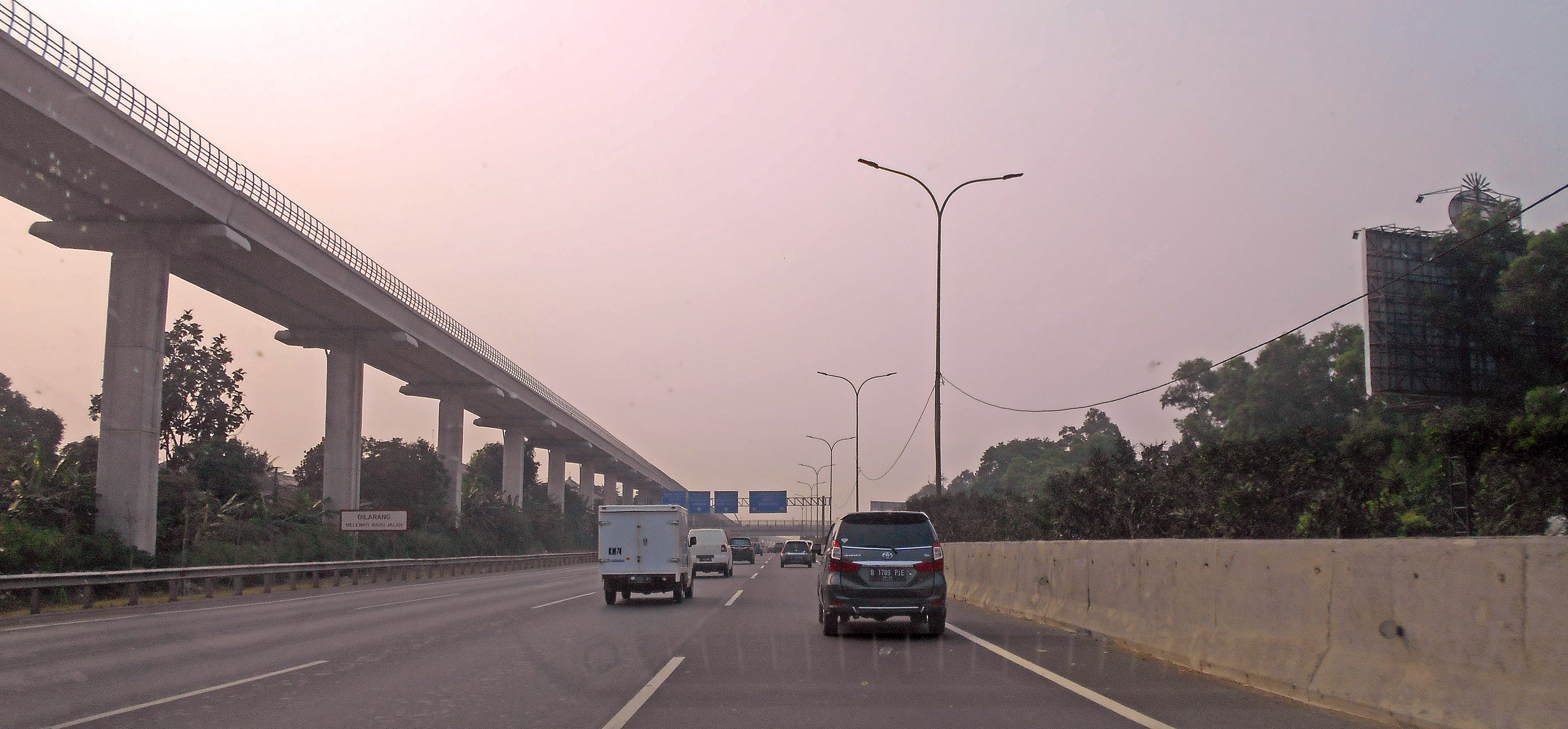
The elevated route is built parallel with the Jagorawi Toll Road.

Like other public transportation systems in Jabodetabek area, the Jabodebek LRT system was built to break down congestion. The construction of the Cawang–Bekasi LRT Line and other lines in the first phase of the Jabodebek LRT construction began with the groundbreaking on 9 September 2015 by President Joko Widodo.

Initially the phase 1 was targeted to be completed before the 2018 Asian Games. However, until the Asian Games were held, the overall progress was still 45%, thus it was unable to be commercially run as targeted.

On 11 October 2019, the first train of Jabodebek LRT arrived in Jakarta. The shipment was carried out by land directly from INKA factory in Madiun, East Java. For the time being, the train has been parked near Harjamukti station of the Cibubur Line; considering that the LRT depot construction in Jatimulya, which is this line's terminus, has not yet been completed.

In October 2020, the Jabodebek LRT trains began their trials.

== Network ==
=== Route ===
The Bekasi Line has a track length of 29.54 kilometers. Most of the trajectory of this route is using an elevated structure. From Dukuh Atas to Cawang, this line shares the route with Cibubur Line, goes along Jalan Rasuna Said then turns to the south side of the Jakarta Inner Ring Road (Cawang–Pluit section). In Cawang station, the two lines split and the line follows the Jakarta–Cikampek Toll Road alignment. The network's depot is located at the Jatimulya terminus, thus the tracks continue to Jatimulya depot after the Jatimulya station.

=== List of stations ===
Station		Transfer/Notes		Location	
Number	Name	Transfer/Notes		City/Regency	Province
Phase 1: Bekasi–Dukuh Atas
BK01 CB01	Dukuh Atas Bank Syariah Indonesia	LRT Line 1 (Greater Jakarta LRT)	Terminus station. Dukuh Atas BNI Sudirman BNI City Dukuh Atas (Planned) Dukuh Atas Galunggung	South Jakarta	Jakarta
BK02 CB02	Setiabudi	LRT Line 1 (Greater Jakarta LRT)	Setiabudi Integritas	South Jakarta	Jakarta
BK03 CB03	Rasuna Said	LRT Line 1 (Greater Jakarta LRT)	Rasuna Said	South Jakarta	Jakarta
BK04 CB04	Kuningan	LRT Line 1 (Greater Jakarta LRT)	Kuningan (PT) Kuningan (Planned)	South Jakarta	Jakarta
BK05 CB05	Pancoran	LRT Line 1 (Greater Jakarta LRT)	Pancoran	South Jakarta	Jakarta
BK06 CB06	Cikoko	LRT Line 1 (Greater Jakarta LRT)	Cawang Cikoko	South Jakarta	Jakarta
BK07 CB07	Ciliwung	LRT Line 1 (Greater Jakarta LRT)	Ciliwung	East Jakarta	Jakarta
BK08 CB08	Cawang	LRT Line 1 (Greater Jakarta LRT)	Interchange station to Cawang	East Jakarta	Jakarta
BK09	Halim		Halim Halim (Planned)	East Jakarta	Jakarta
BK10	Jati Bening Baru			Bekasi	West Java
BK11	Cikunir 1			Bekasi	West Java
BK12	Cikunir 2			Bekasi	West Java
BK13	Bekasi Barat		K1 Stasiun LRT Bekasi Barat K1 Lobby Revo Mall (BE) Bekasi Barat (Planned)	Bekasi	West Java
BK14	Jati Mulya		Terminus station.	Bekasi Regency	West Java
Phase 2: Jati Mulya–Cibatu (under feasibility study)
	Tambun Selatan			Bekasi Regency	West Java
	Lambangsari			Bekasi Regency	West Java
	Cibuntu			Bekasi Regency	West Java
	Danau Indah			Bekasi Regency	West Java
	Cikarang Barat		(LT) Cikarang Barat (Planned)	Bekasi Regency	West Java
	Cibatu			Bekasi Regency	West Java

== Future development ==
According to current JUTPI 3 proposal, Bekasi Line will be extended to South Cikarang in Bekasi Regency.
