= Dukuh Atas Bank Syariah Indonesia LRT station =

Light rapid transit station in Jakarta, Indonesia

CB01 BK01 Dukuh Atas Bank Syariah Indonesia
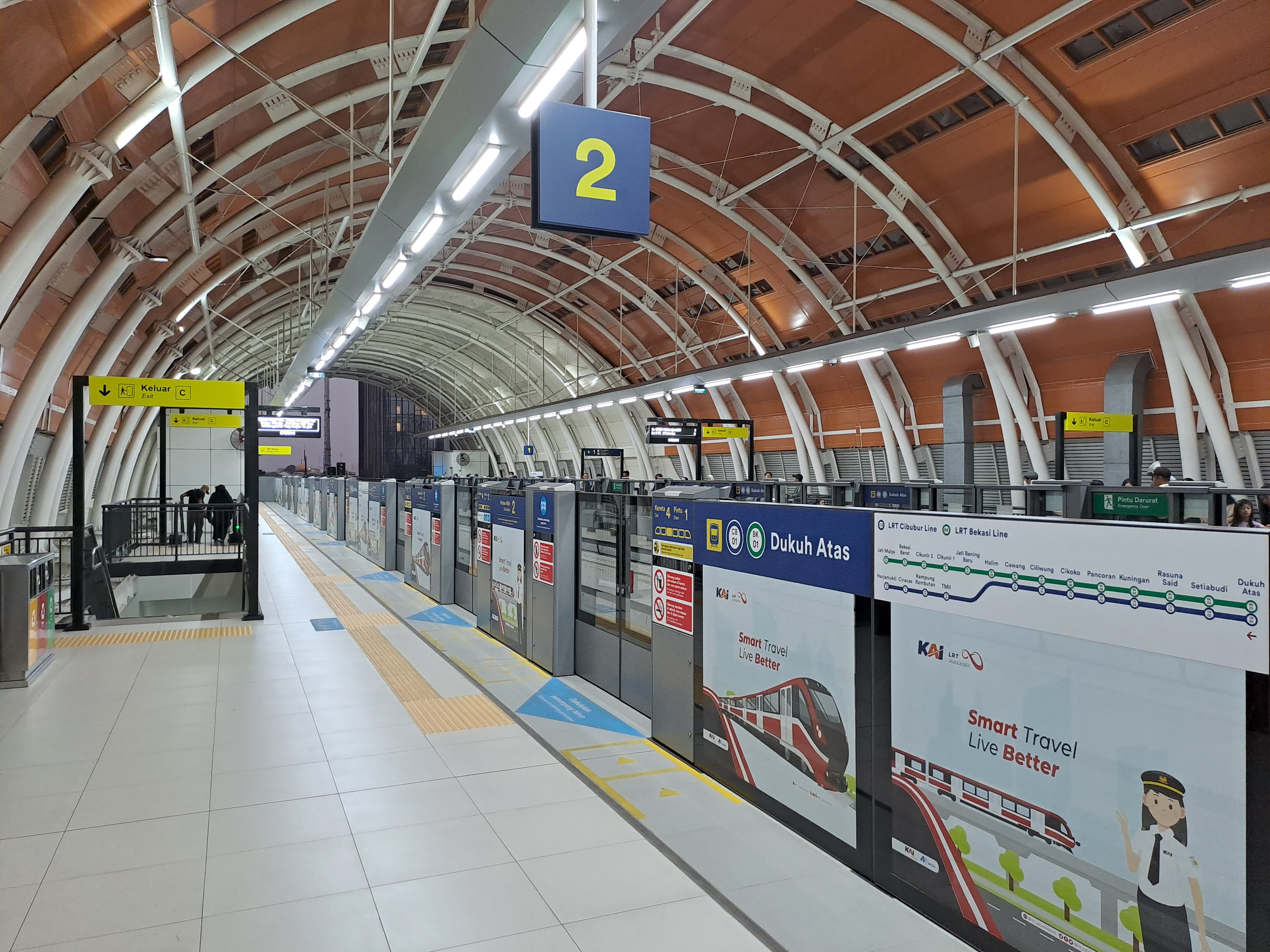
- The LRT Station platform in 2023

General information
- Location: Dukuh Atas TOD, Jalan Setia Budi Tengah, Kuningan Timur, Setiabudi, South Jakarta, Jakarta, Indonesia.
- Coordinates: 6.204706170877988°S 106.82564553830008°E
- System: Jabodebek LRT station
- Owner: Ministry of Transportation via the Directorate General of Railways
- Manager: Kereta Api Indonesia
- Lines: Cibubur Line; Bekasi Line
- Platforms: 2 side platforms
- Tracks: 2
- Connections: Dukuh Atas BNI; BNI City; Sudirman; Dukuh Atas; Galunggung

Construction
- Structure type: Elevated
- Cycle facilities: Bicycle parking
- Accessible: Yes

Other information
- Station code: DKA

History
- Opened: 28 August 2023
- Electrified: 2019

Services
Preceding station		Following station
Terminus	Cibubur Line	Setiabudi towards Harjamukti
Terminus	Bekasi Line	Setiabudi towards Jati Mulya
Route map
Location

Dukuh Atas LRT Station (or Dukuh Atas Bank Syariah Indonesia LRT Station, with Bank Syariah Indonesia granted for naming rights) is a light rapid transit station located within the Dukuh Atas TOD in Jalan Setia Budi Tengah, Kuningan Timur, Setiabudi, South Jakarta, Jakarta, Indonesia. The station, which is located at an altitude of +27.9 meters, serves the Cibubur and Bekasi lines of the Jabodebek LRT system.

== History ==
The station was constructed by the state-owned construction company PT Adhi Karya (Persero) Tbk, which was started in March 2019. The construction was expected to finish in June 2023, and the station was opened along with the rest of the route on 28 August 2023.

== Naming rights ==
On 20 November 2024, Bank Negara Indonesia officially bought the naming rights for Dukuh Atas LRT station, hence the official name Dukuh Atas BNI. Implementations of the naming right had done months before the official inauguration. After the one-year contract expired, the BNI brand was removed from the station's name on 23 December 2025.

On 22 May 2026, Bank Syariah Indonesia became the second right holder for Dukuh Atas LRT station, hence Dukuh Atas Bank Syariah Indonesia.

== Station layout ==
2nd floor	Side platform, the doors are opened on the right side
2nd floor	Line 1	← (Setiabudi)	Cibubur Line to Harjamukti, Bekasi Line to Jati Mulya
2nd floor	Line 2	← (Setiabudi)	Bekasi Line (arrivals only)
2nd floor	Side platform, the doors are opened on the right side
1st floor	Concourse	Ticket counter, ticket vending machines, fare gates, retail kiosks, and connection bridge to the Dukuh Atas TOD
Ground level	Street	Entrance/Exit

== Services ==
- Cibubur Line towards Harjamukti
- Bekasi Line towards Jati Mulya

== Supporting transportation ==
The station is located at the Dukuh Atas TOD, where the development includes Dukuh Atas BNI station of the Jakarta MRT, Sudirman station of the KRL Commuterline, BNI City of the Airport Rail Link and Transjakarta bus services. The Dukuh Atas LRT Station is connected with the Sudirman and BNI City railway stations, Dukuh Atas BNI MRT station, and Dukuh Atas TransJakarta bus stop via Dukuh Atas multipurpose crossing bridge. The three-story multipurpose crossing bridge (Indonesian: Jembatan Penyebrangan Multiguna / JPM) was built since 2021 and was opened along with the LRT station on 28 August 2023.

Type	Station	Route	Destination
Rail-based
Jakarta MRT	Dukuh Atas BNI	North–South Line	Lebak Bulus–Bundaran HI
KAI Commuter	Sudirman	Cikarang Loop Line	Cikarang-Jatinegara-Manggarai-Duri-Kampung Bandan-Pasar Senen-Jatinegara-Cikarang
KAI Commuter	BNI City	Cikarang Loop Line	Cikarang-Jatinegara-Manggarai-Duri-Kampung Bandan-Pasar Senen-Jatinegara-Cikarang
KAI Commuter	BNI City	Airport Rail Link	SHIA–Manggarai
Bus routes
Transjakarta	Dukuh Atas	List of Transjakarta corridors#Corridor 1	Blok M–Kota
Transjakarta	Dukuh Atas	List of TransJakarta corridors#Cross-corridor routes	Ragunan–Semanggi–Balai Kota
Transjakarta	Galunggung	List of Transjakarta corridors#Corridor 4	Galunggung–Pulo Gadung
Transjakarta	Galunggung	List of TransJakarta corridors#Corridor 6	Galunggung–Ragunan
Transjakarta	Galunggung	(non-BRT)	Galunggung–Bekasi
Transjakarta	Dukuh Atas	(non-BRT)	Palmerah Station–Dukuh Atas Transport Hub
Transjakarta			Senen–Blok M
Transjakarta			Senen–Dukuh Atas Transport Hub
Transjakarta			Dukuh Atas–Casablanca via Epicentrum
Transjakarta			Pasar Minggu– Tanah Abang
Transjakarta			Cibubur Junction–Balai Kota
