= Jati Mulya LRT station =

LRT station in Indonesia

BK14 Jati Mulya
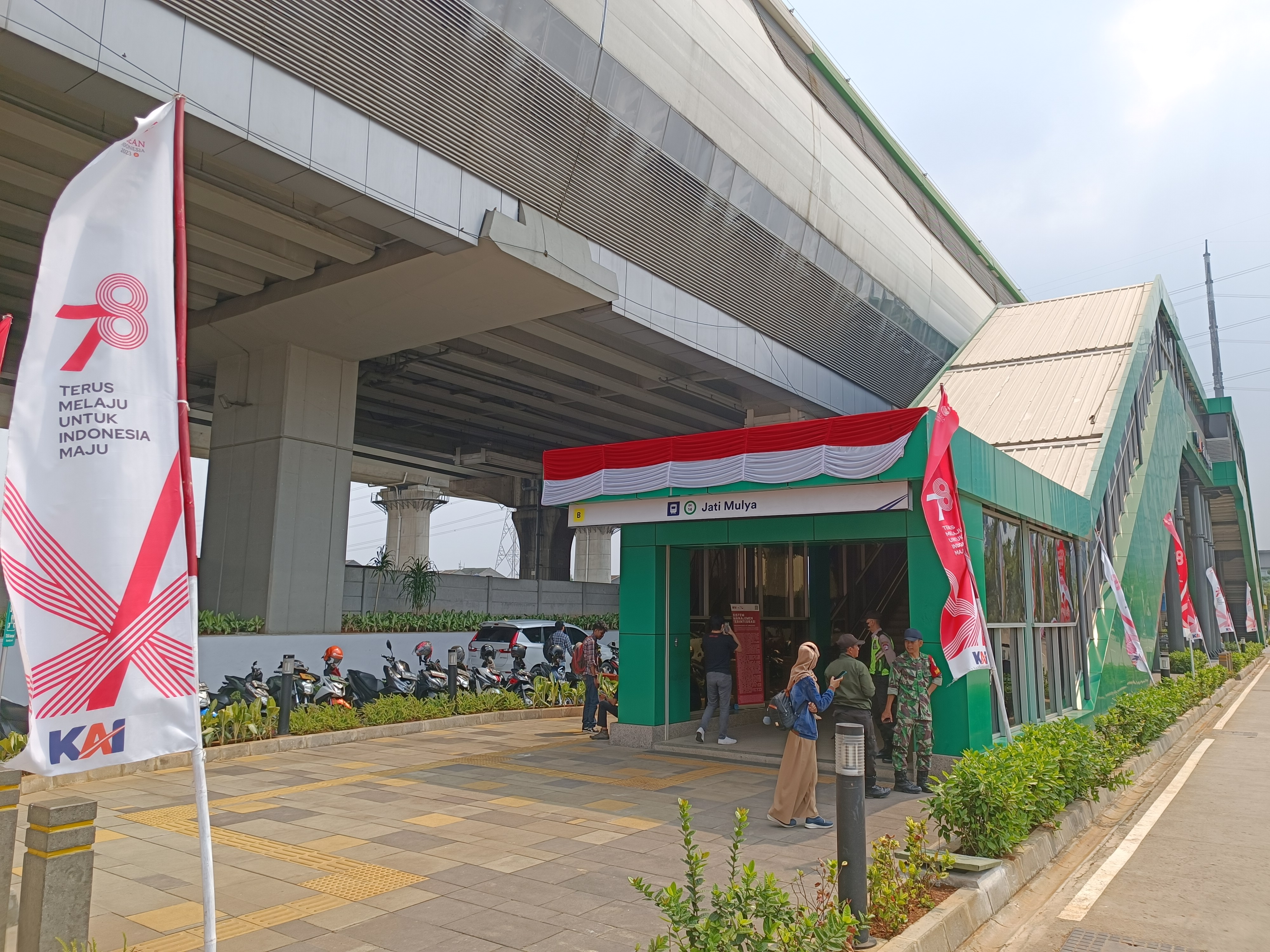
- Jati Mulya LRT Station entrance, 2023

General information
- Location: Jalan Cempaka-Margahayu, Jatimulya, South Tambun, Bekasi Regency, West Java, Indonesia
- Coordinates: 6.263952°S 107.021432°E
- System: Jabodebek LRT station
- Owner: Ministry of Transportation via the Directorate General of Railways
- Manager: Kereta Api Indonesia
- Line: Bekasi Line
- Platforms: 2 side platforms
- Tracks: 2

Construction
- Structure type: Elevated
- Cycle facilities: Bicycle parking
- Accessible: Yes

Other information
- Station code: JTM

History
- Opened: 28 August 2023
- Electrified: 2019

Services
Preceding station		Following station
Bekasi Barat towards Dukuh Atas BNI	Bekasi Line	Terminus
Route map
Location

Jati Mulya LRT Station is a light rapid transit station located in Jalan Cempaka-Margahayu, Jatimulya, South Tambun, Bekasi Regency, Indonesia. The station, which is located at an altitude of +37.780 meters, serves the Bekasi line of the Jabodebek LRT system as the eastern terminus. It is where the system's main train depot and headquarters are located.

== Station layout ==
2nd floor	Side platform, the doors are opened on the right side (arrivals, alighting passengers only)
2nd floor	Line 1	Bekasi Line to Dukuh Atas Bank Syariah Indonesia	(Bekasi Barat) →
2nd floor	Line 2	Bekasi Line to Dukuh Atas Bank Syariah Indonesia	(Bekasi Barat) →
2nd floor	Side platform, the doors are opened on the right side (departure)
1st floor	Concourse	Ticket counter, ticket vending machines, fare gates, retail kiosks
Ground level	Street	Entrance/Exit

== Services ==
Bekasi Line

== Gallery ==
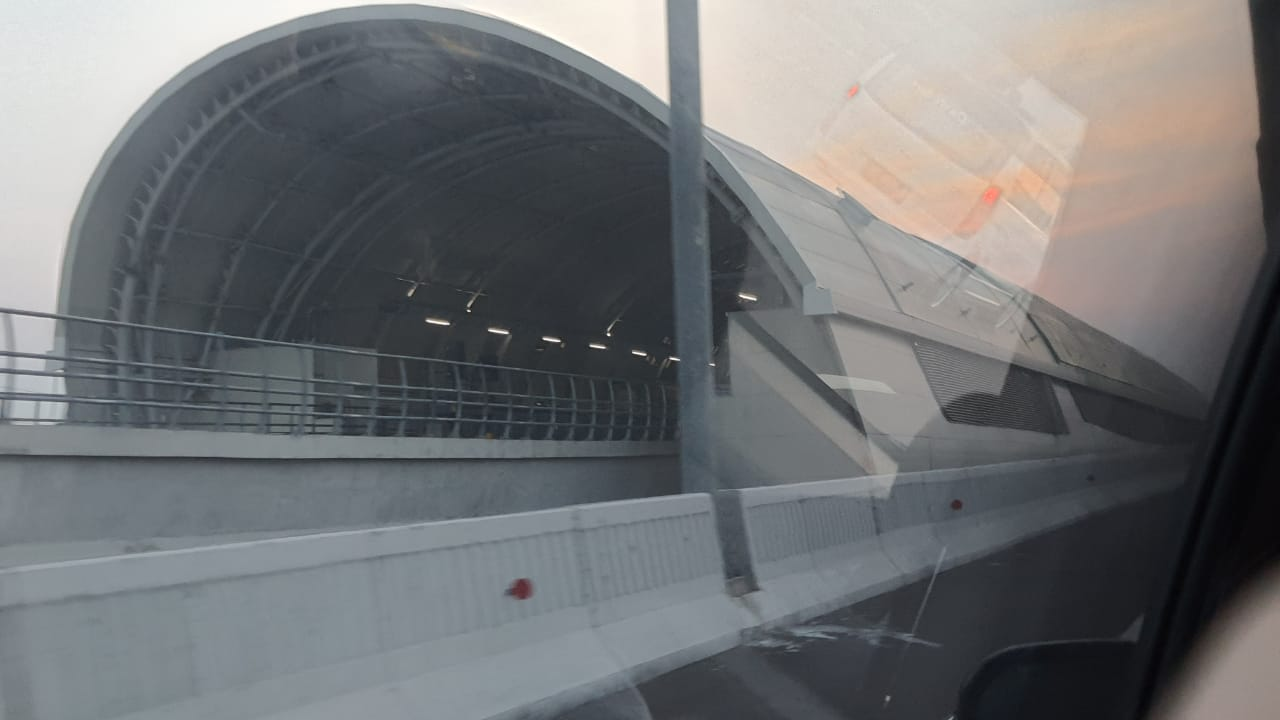
Jati Mulya LRT station under construction, 2021

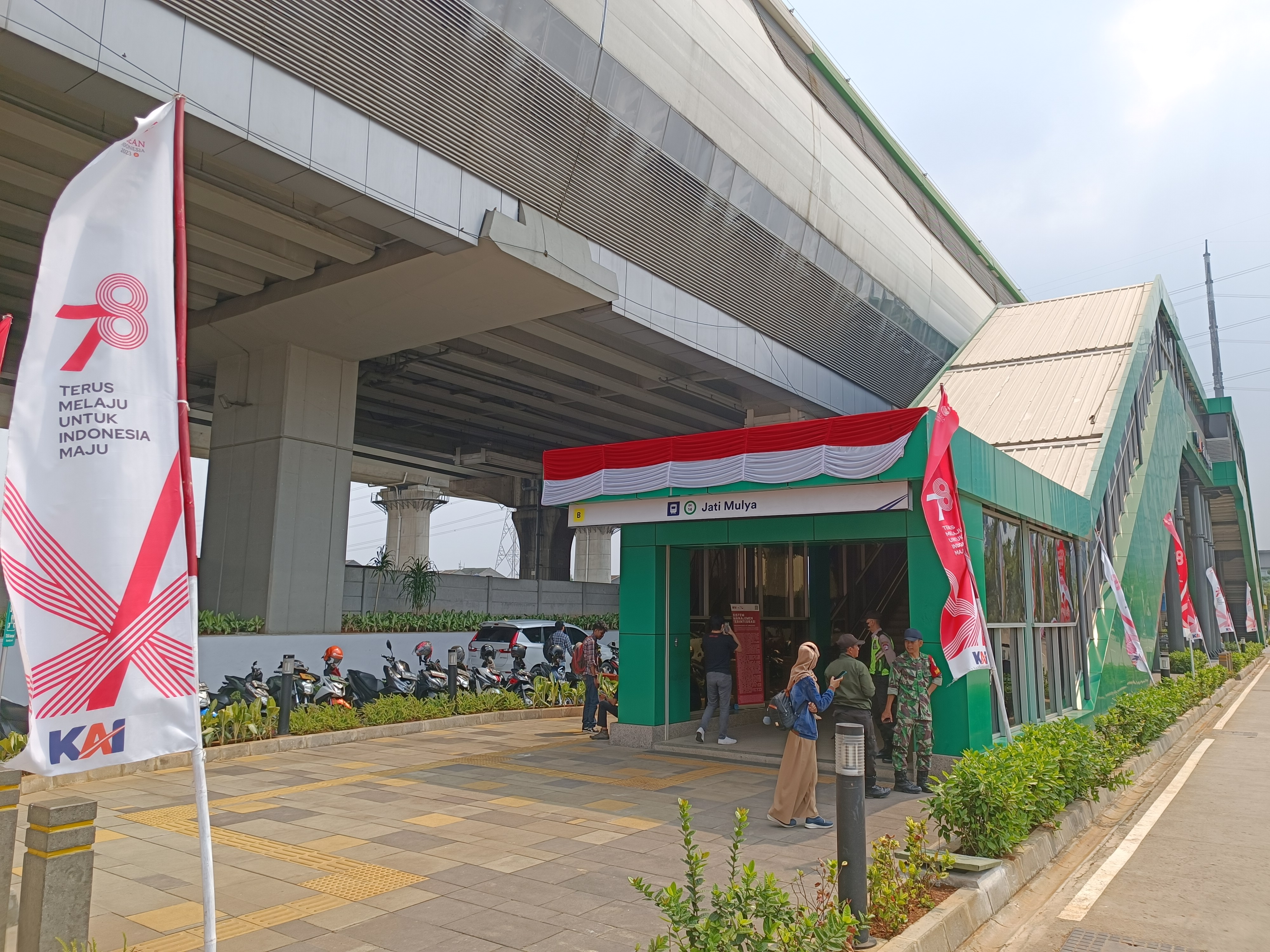
Jati Mulya LRT station Entrance B

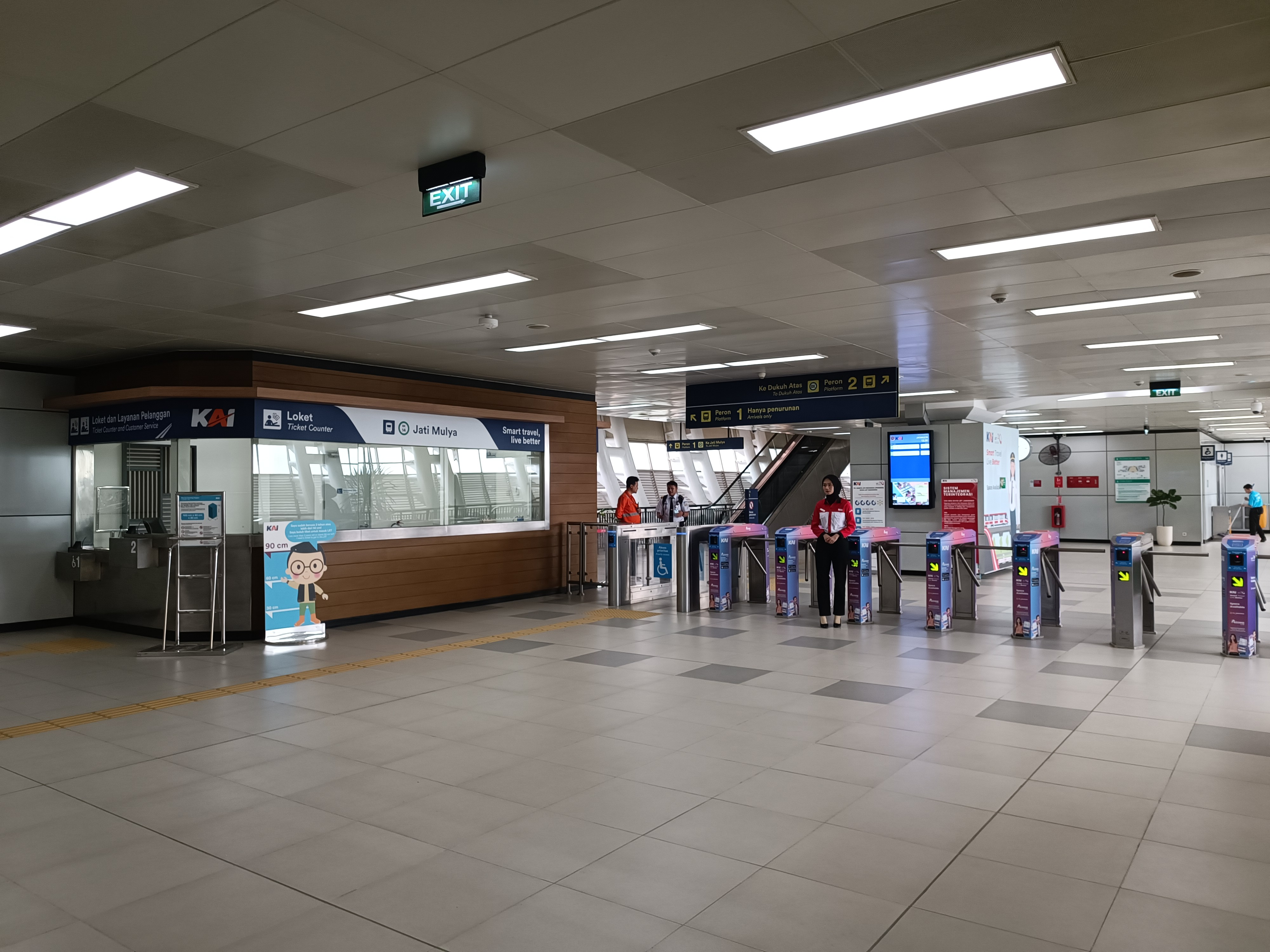
Concourse and ticket counter

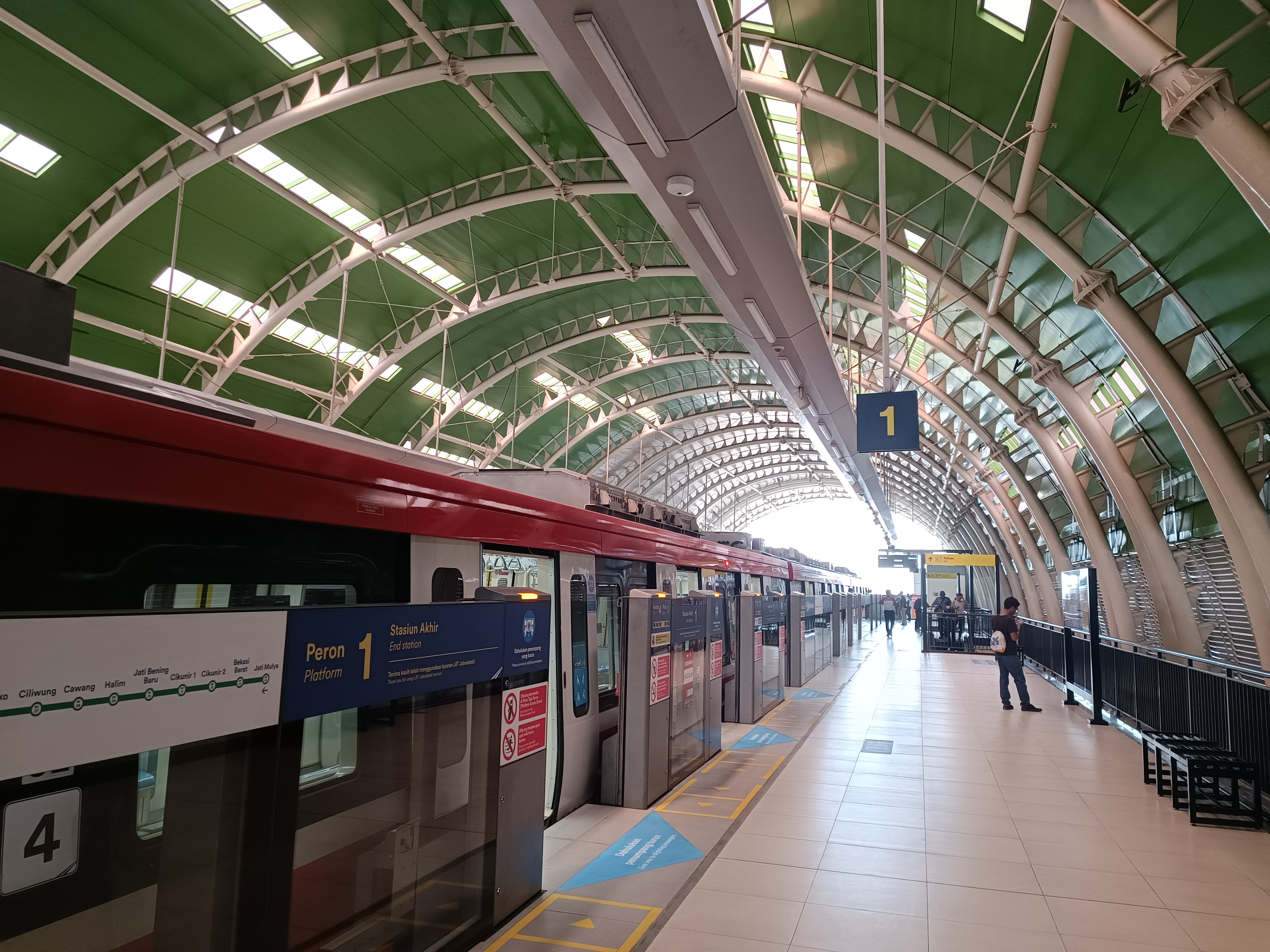
Platform 1 of Jati Mulya LRT station, 2023

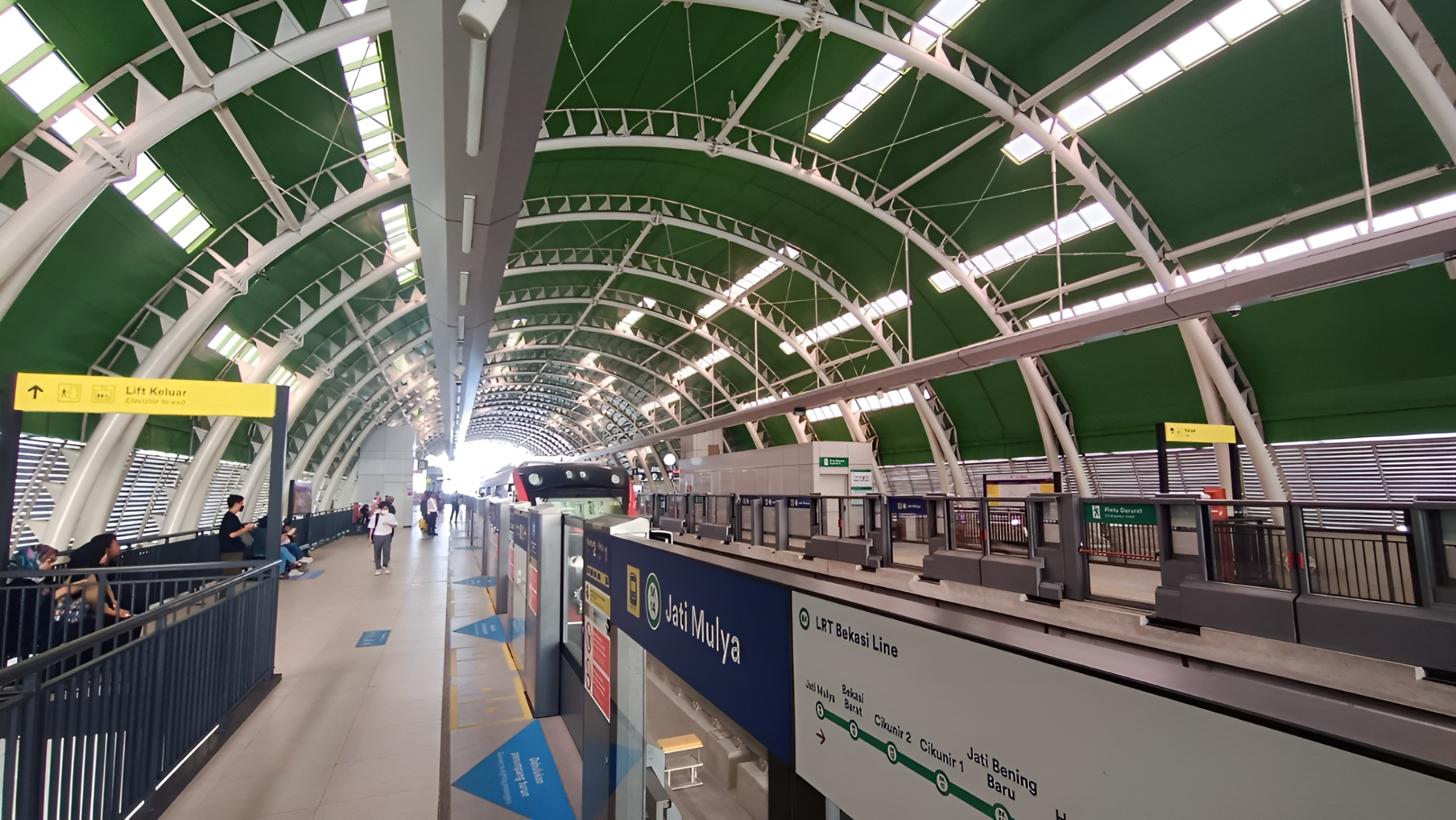
Platform 1 of Jati Mulya LRT station during trial, 2023
