= Jabodebek LRT =

Light rapid transit system in Greater Jakarta, Indonesia

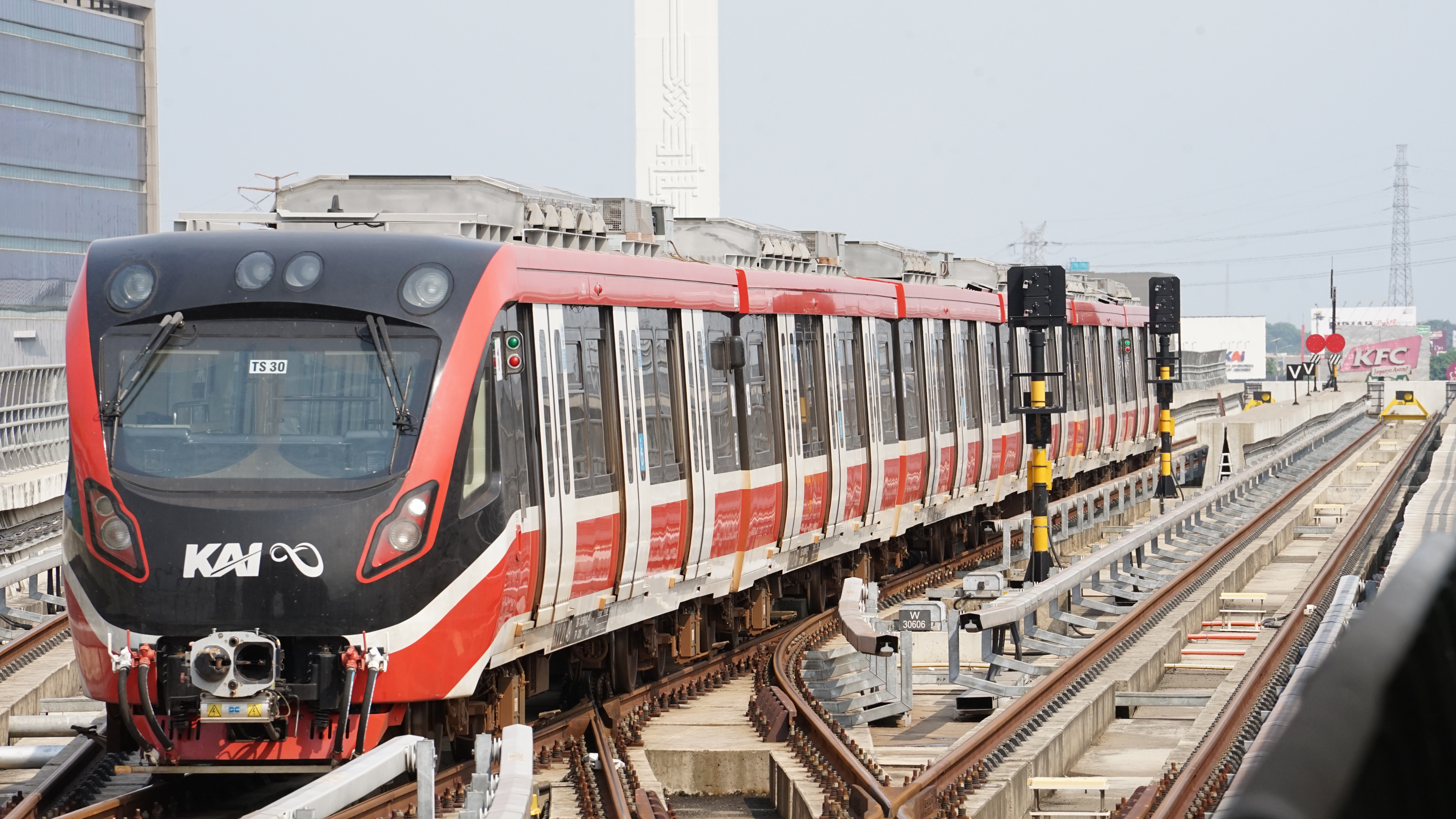
- Jabodebek LRT arriving to Jati Mulya station

Overview
- Owner: Directorate General of Railways (DJKA) of the Ministry of Transportation
- Area served: Greater Jakarta (Note: Greater Tangerang is excluded. However, plans exist to expand the system to the Soekarno–Hatta International Airport, which is in Tangerang City proper.)
- Locale: Jakarta, Indonesia
- Transit type: Light rapid transit
- Number of lines: 2
- Number of stations: 18 (first phase)
- Daily ridership: 118,114 (daily peak); 78,950 (2025 average)
- Annual ridership: 28.82 million (2025)
- Headquarters: Division of LRT Jabodebek Office, Jalan Kalimalang, Bekasi, 17510, Indonesia
- Website: lrtjabodebek.kai.id

Operation
- Began operation: 28 August 2023; 3 years ago
- Operator: Kereta Api Indonesia
- Character: Elevated
- Number of vehicles: 31 six-car INKA trainsets
- Headway: 10 minutes (peak); 20 minutes (off-peak)

Technical
- System length: 43.5 km (27.0 mi) (operational); 86.9 km (54.0 mi) (planned); 130.4 km (81.0 mi) (total)
- Track gauge: 1,435 mm (4 ft 8 1/2 in) standard gauge
- Electrification: 750 V DC from third rail
- Top speed: 90 km/h (55 mph)
System map
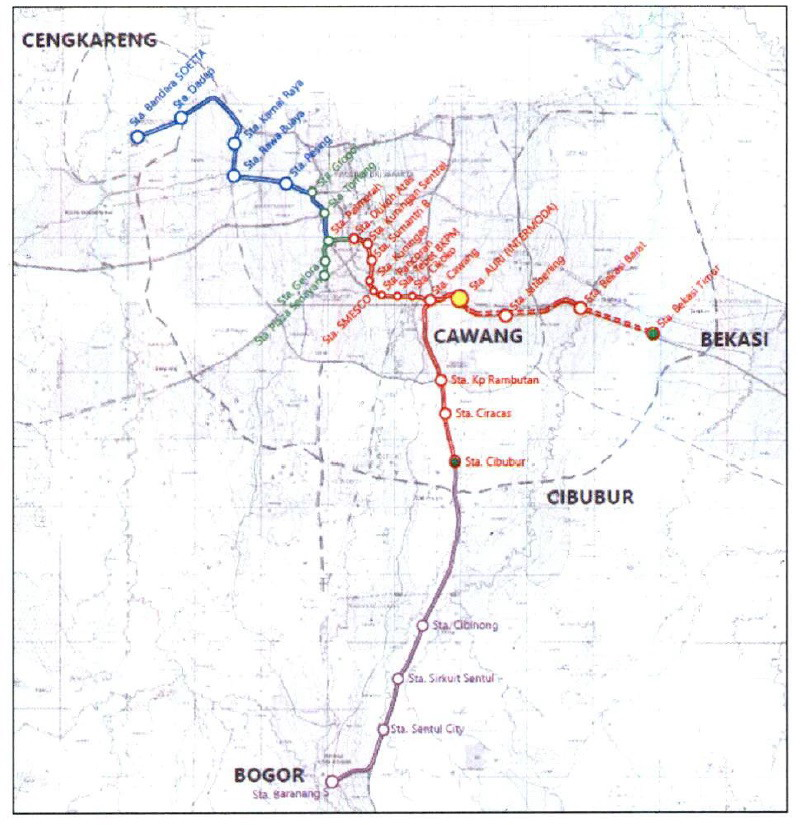

The Jabodebek Light Rapid Transit or Jabodebek LRT, formerly known as Greater Jakarta LRT is a fully automated light rapid transit system in Greater Jakarta, the capital city of Indonesia, as well as the adjacent areas of West Java, within the Jakarta Metropolitan area. It was implemented by the central government, and operated by Kereta Api Indonesia (KAI), the system connects the Jakarta city center with suburbs in Greater Jakarta such as Bogor, Depok and Bekasi, hence its acronym Jabodebek.

The operation of the Jabodebek LRT was initially targeted to begin in 2019, but the line was hampered by numerous delays due to the COVID-19 pandemic. It commenced official commercial operations on 28 August 2023.

== History ==
=== Background ===
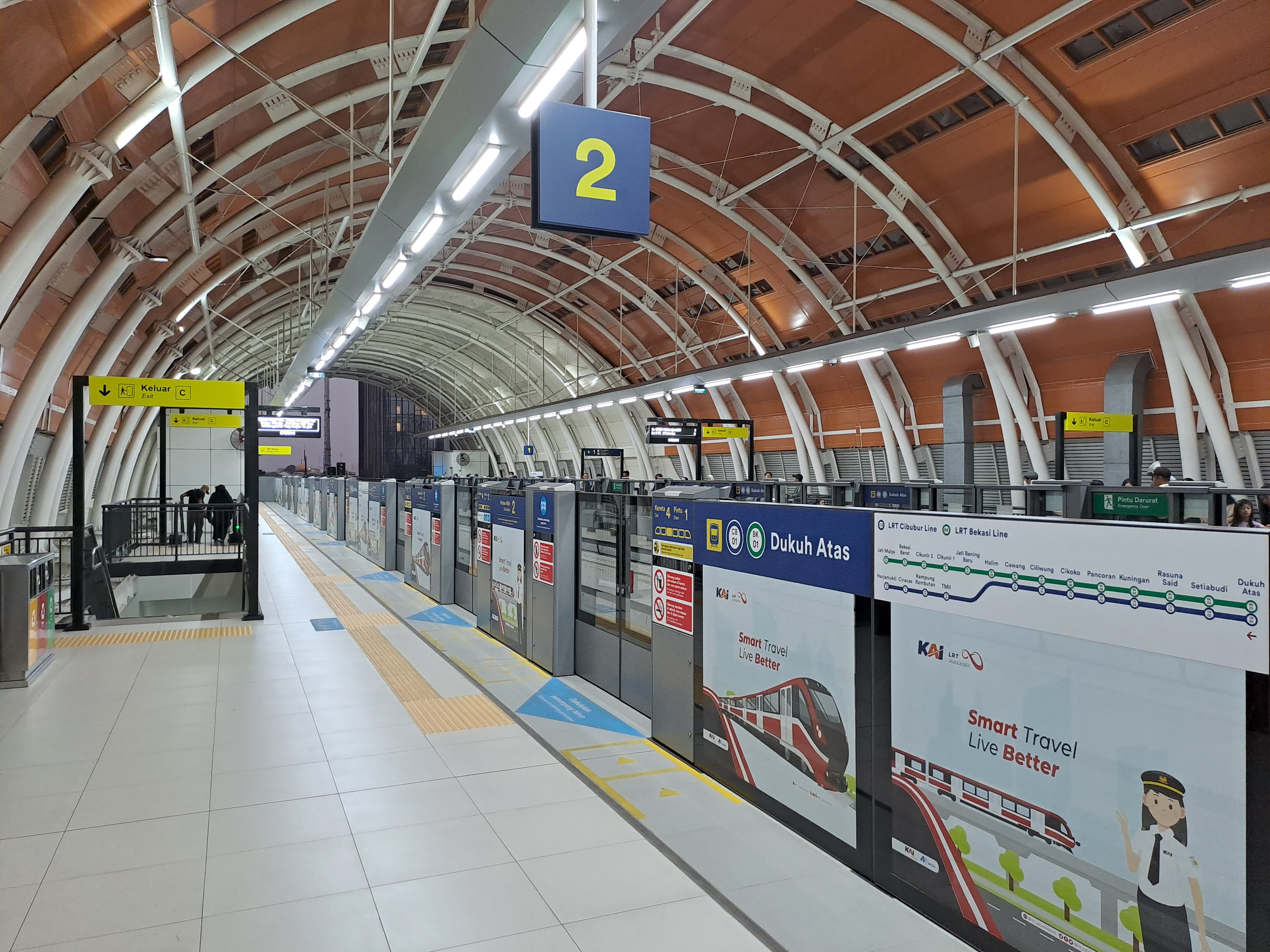
Dukuh Atas BNI Station Platform

The Jabodebek light rapid transit project aims to tackle Jakarta's high road traffic congestion. The northern section of the LRT project partly replaces the Jakarta Monorail project which has been cancelled.

The monorail project in Jakarta was planned since the early 2000s. Construction commenced in 2004 but immediately stalled due to insufficient funding. In 2005 the initial pylons were constructed. However, the project was abandoned altogether in 2008, leaving the unfinished pylons blocking the main roads. The monorail line design, including the Green loop line and Blue line gained criticism as it only connected shopping malls in Jakarta's city center and would not connect to Jakarta's suburbs, which desperately need transportation infrastructure, and thus would not be useful for Jakartan commuters. Transportation experts deemed that the city center monorail project would not address Jakarta's traffic problems, but would only serve as a novelty tourists' ride. To answer the need for commuter infrastructure, a consortium of five state owned enterprises, led by PT Adhi Karya (previously part of the Jakarta Monorail consortium), proposed the construction of a 39.036-kilometre (24.256-mile) monorail line connecting Cibubur-Cawang-Kuningan and Bekasi-Cawang across Greater Jakarta. The line will connect the 'Green' and 'Blue' lines originally planned by PT Jakarta Monorail to Jakarta's suburbs Cibubur and Bekasi.

=== Replaced to light rapid transit ===
In 2013, the Jakarta monorail project was revived and relaunched. In mid-2014, however, the project was stalled after a disagreement between PT Jakarta Monorel, the developer/operator, and the Jakarta Provincial Government over land acquisition for the depot as well as the station designs. Following the disagreements, by 2015 the Jakarta Provincial Government under Basuki Tjahaja Purnama terminated its contract with PT Jakarta Monorel; thus monorail project was disbanded altogether. The numerous stalled monorail support poles will be used by state-owned construction company PT Adhi Karya to develop Jakarta's light rapid transit instead.

=== Lines ===
In 2015, it was announced that the Indonesian Cabinet Secretary has endorsed the plan to build three light rail transit lines. Total investment cost of this project is estimated to reach 23.8 trillion rupiah (1.8 billion US dollars).

There are two service lines on the system:

- Cibubur Line (Dukuh Atas–Harjamukti) (initially Cawang–Harjamukti)
  - Station names: Dukuh Atas BNI – Setiabudi – Rasuna Said – Kuningan – Pancoran Bank BJB – Cikoko – Ciliwung – Cawang – TMII (Taman Mini Indonesia Indah) – Kampung Rambutan – Ciracas – Harjamukti
- Bekasi Line (Dukuh Atas–Jati Mulya) (initially Cawang–Jati Mulya)
  - Station names: Dukuh Atas BNI – Setiabudi – Rasuna Said – Kuningan – Pancoran Bank BJB – Cikoko – Ciliwung – Cawang – Halim – Jati Bening Baru – Cikunir 1 – Cikunir 2 – Bekasi Barat – Jati Mulya

Technically there are three line segments built: Dukuh Atas–Cawang, Cawang–Harjamukti, and Cawang–Jati Mulya, however the service only consist of two lines, with Dukuh Atas–Cawang segment shared between the two.

The construction phase of extension for the planned route Grogol–Pesing–Rawa Buaya–Kamal Raya–Dadap–Soekarno–Hatta International Airport was proposed, but was not mentioned in the Presidential Regulation No. 98 of 2015 which sets the legal framework for state funding.

=== Phase 1 ===
Phase 1 of the construction consists the entirety of Line 2 (Cawang–Bekasi Timur), part of Line 1 (Cibubur–Cawang–Baranangsiang) and Line 3 (Cawang-Dukuh Atas-Senayan). The first phase will cost 11.9 trillion rupiah (approx. USD 903.6 million). It will be 43.3 kilometres (26.9 miles) long, consisting of 18 stations.

- Phase 1A (Cibubur–Cawang–Dukuh Atas): 24.8 km (15.4 mi)
- Phase 1B (Cawang–Bekasi Timur): 18.5 km (11.5 mi)

Construction of Phase 1 began on 9 September 2015 and was initially predicted to be operational by early 2018, in time for the 2018 Asian Games. However, due to funding, restructuring and land acquisition issues, the project has failed to meet the deadline.

As of August 2021, construction progress had reached 86.57% (93.88% for Cibubur–Cawang, 86.87% for Cawang–Dukuh Atas and 91.58% for Cawang–Bekasi Timur).

The LRT's public free trial run, similar to the Jakarta MRT, was planned to start on 12 July 2023, with commercial operations slated to begin on 17 August 2023. The trial lasted until 17 July, before it was halted for a software upgrade.

=== Phase 2 ===
Phase 2 will extend Line 1 southwards, from Harjamukti to Bogor Baranangsiang, and also extending from the other end from Dukuh Atas to Palmerah and Senayan. It is currently in the planning stage.

== System network ==
The Jabodebek LRT is expected to stretch across over 130.4 kilometres (81.0 miles), including 24.8 kilometres (15.4 miles) for the Cibubur line (from Harjamukti to Dukuh Atas Bank Syariah Indonesia), 18.5 kilometres (11.5 miles) for the Bekasi line (from Cawang to Jati Mulya), and 85.9 kilometres (53.4 miles) for the Extended line (from Bogor to Soekarno Hatta).

Colour and Line Name	Phase	Service Commencement	Terminus	Stations	Length	Depot
Operational
Cibubur Line	1	28 August 2023	Dukuh Atas Bank Syariah Indonesia; Harjamukti	12	25.0 km (15.5 mi)	Jati Mulya
Bekasi Line	1	28 August 2023	Cawang; Jati Mulya	7	18.5 km (11.5 mi)	Jati Mulya
Under Preparation
Bogor Line	2	TBA	Harjamukti; Bogor Baranangsiang	TBA	25.0 km (15.5 mi)	TBA
Planned
Senayan Line	3	TBA	Dukuh Atas Bank Syariah Indonesia; Senayan	TBA	7.8 km (4.8 mi)	TBA
Grogol Line	3	TBA	Palmerah; Grogol	TBA	5.7 km (3.5 mi)	TBA
Soetta Line	3	TBA	Grogol; Soetta Airport	TBA	35.9 km (22.3 mi)	TBA

== Ridership ==
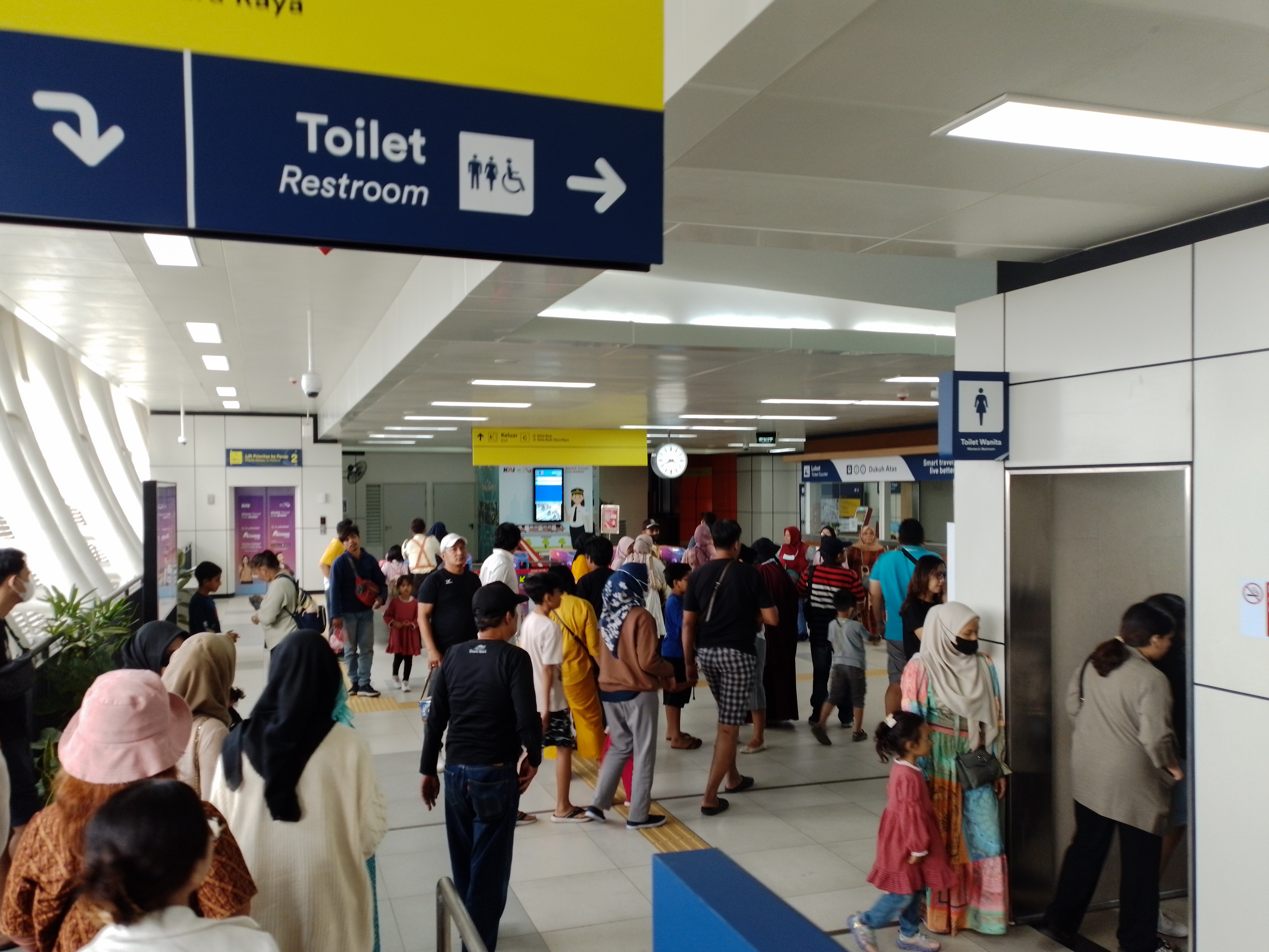
Passengers at the concourse of the Dukuh Atas BNI LRT station

The system carried 6,475 passengers on its opening day, 96,426 passengers within four days of opening, and over 620,000 passengers by 13 September. The Indonesian Ministry of Transport set a target of 120,000 daily passengers in the short term, and 500,000 within the medium term. On 16 September, the amount of daily trips was increased from 158 to 202, with extended operating hours. However, ridership keeps declining to 34,382 in mid-October due to the end of promotional fare of Rp 5,000 and decreased trips due to the maintenance process for 15 of the 31 available trainsets.

Greater Jakarta LRT gets more ridership in 2024 despite the end of the promotional fare. During weekdays it has a ridership of 45,287 people per day and during weekend its ridership is 29,592 people per day. Greater Jakarta LRT has already carried more than 10 million passengers in less than a year despite the problems during the early period of its operation that has limited the number of train sets in operation.

In July 2024, Greater Jakarta LRT monthly ridership made a new record and recorded as the biggest ridership since its operation at more than 2 million passengers within a month.

== Rolling stock ==
LRT Jabodebek LRV (iE203)
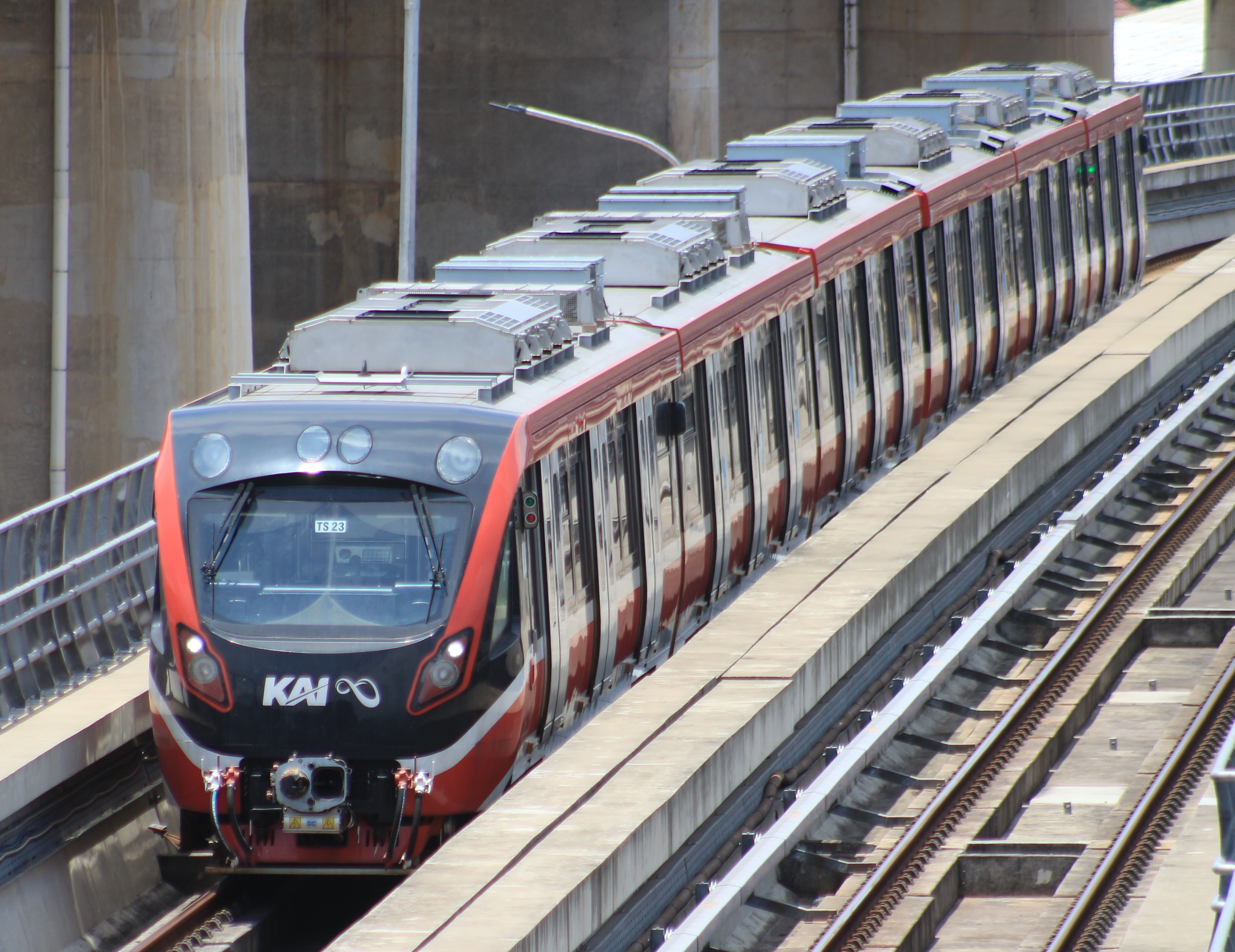
- An LRT Jabodebek LRV in Bekasi Line
- Stock type: Electric multiple unit
- In service: 2023–Present
- Manufacturer: INKA
- Built at: INKA Madiun
- Number built: 31 sets
- Number in service: 31 sets
- Formation: 6-car sets
- Fleet numbers: K1 1 19 01 - K1 1 19 42; K1 1 20 19 - K1 1 20 114; K1 1 21 01 - K1 1 21 60
- Capacity: 1,300-1,500
- Owner: PT Kereta Api Indonesia
- Operator: PT Kereta Api Indonesia LRT Jabodebek Division
- Lines served: Cibubur Line; Bekasi Line

Specifications
- Car length: 17.1 m (56 ft 1 in)
- Width: 2.65 m (8 ft 8 in)
- Height: 3,685 mm (12 ft 1.1 in) (including roof equipment)
- Floor height: 1 m (3 ft 3 in)
- Doors: 3 per side
- Wheel diameter: 780–700 mm (31–28 in) (new–worn)
- Maximum speed: 90 km/h (56 mph)
- Traction system: CAF Power IGBT–VVVF
- Traction motors: 16 × 100 kW (130 hp) asynchronous 3-phase AC
- Power output: 1,600 kW (2,100 hp)
- HVAC: INKA I-Cond ACI-3601
- Electric systems: 750 V DC (nominal) from third rail
- UIC classification: Bo′Bo′+Bo′Bo′+2′2′+2′2′+Bo′Bo′+Bo′Bo′
- Safety systems: Siemens Trainguard MT moving block CBTC with subsystems of ATC, ATO under GoA 3 (DTO), ATP, ATS and CBI
- Coupling system: Dellner
- Seating: Longitudinal
- Track gauge: 1,435 mm (4 ft 8 1/2 in) standard gauge

LRT Jabodebek uses EMU rolling stock manufactured by PT. INKA, also known as iE203 series. There are 31 LRT Jabodebek Trainsets which consist of 6 cars per set, with 186 traincars in total. LRT Jabodebek LRV's run on 1,435 mm (4 ft 8.5 in) Standard gauge as opposed to the Mainline's Cape gauge, along with using third rail power. Each 6-car Trainset can carry up to 1,300–1,500 passengers during rush hour. All trainsets have a red, black and white color scheme with the exception of those with advertisement wrappings.

The first LRT Jabodebek Light Rail Vehicle was sent on land from INKA's Madiun Factory on 8 October 2019 and arrived in Jakarta on 11 October 2019. On 13 October, the trainsets were lifted up onto the tracks at Harjamukti LRT Station.

The Jabodebek LRT trainsets come equipped with locally developed CBTC and GoA Level 3 ATO Train Control Systems and are operated without a train operator.

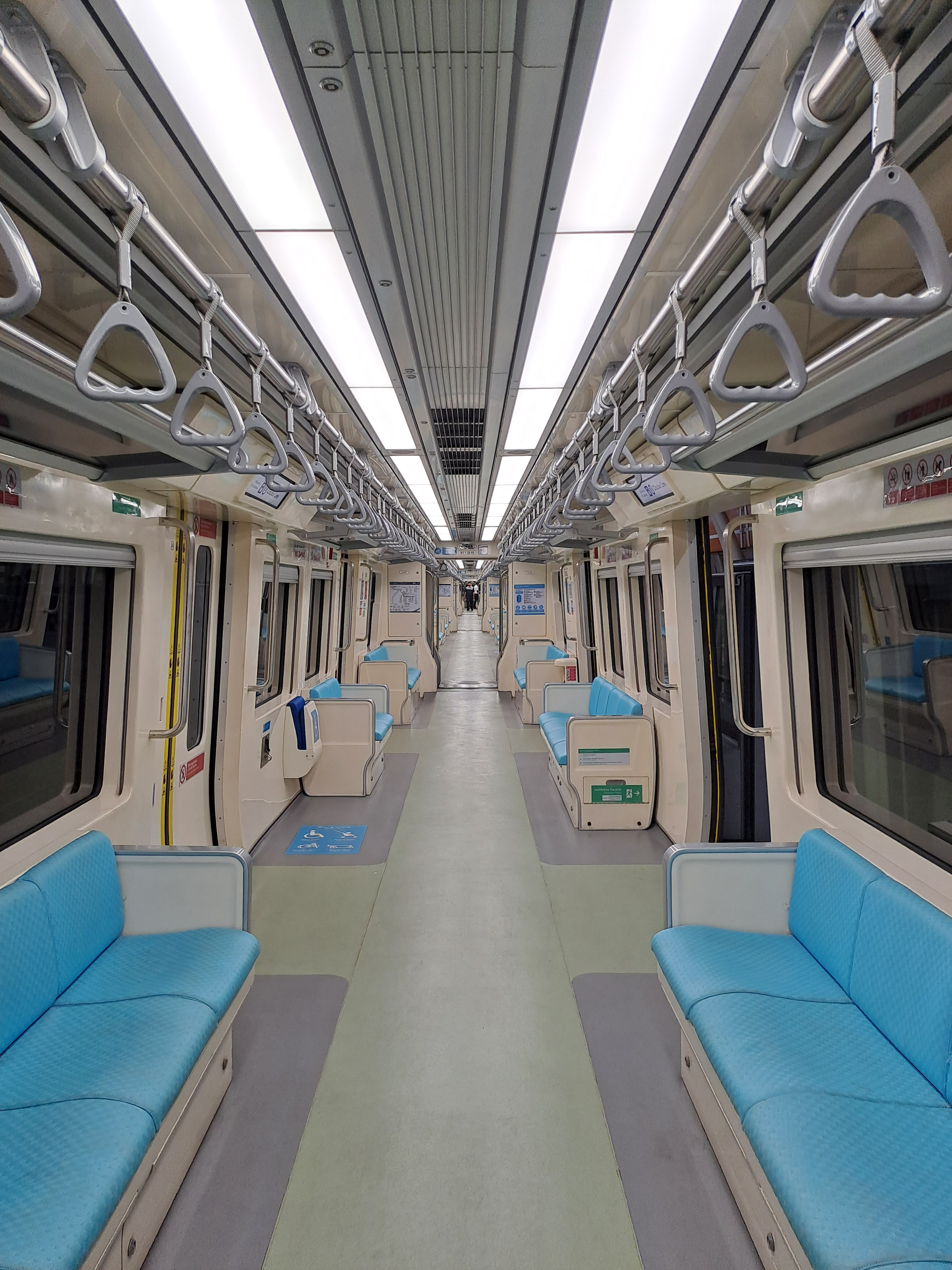
Interior of LRT Jabodebek LRV

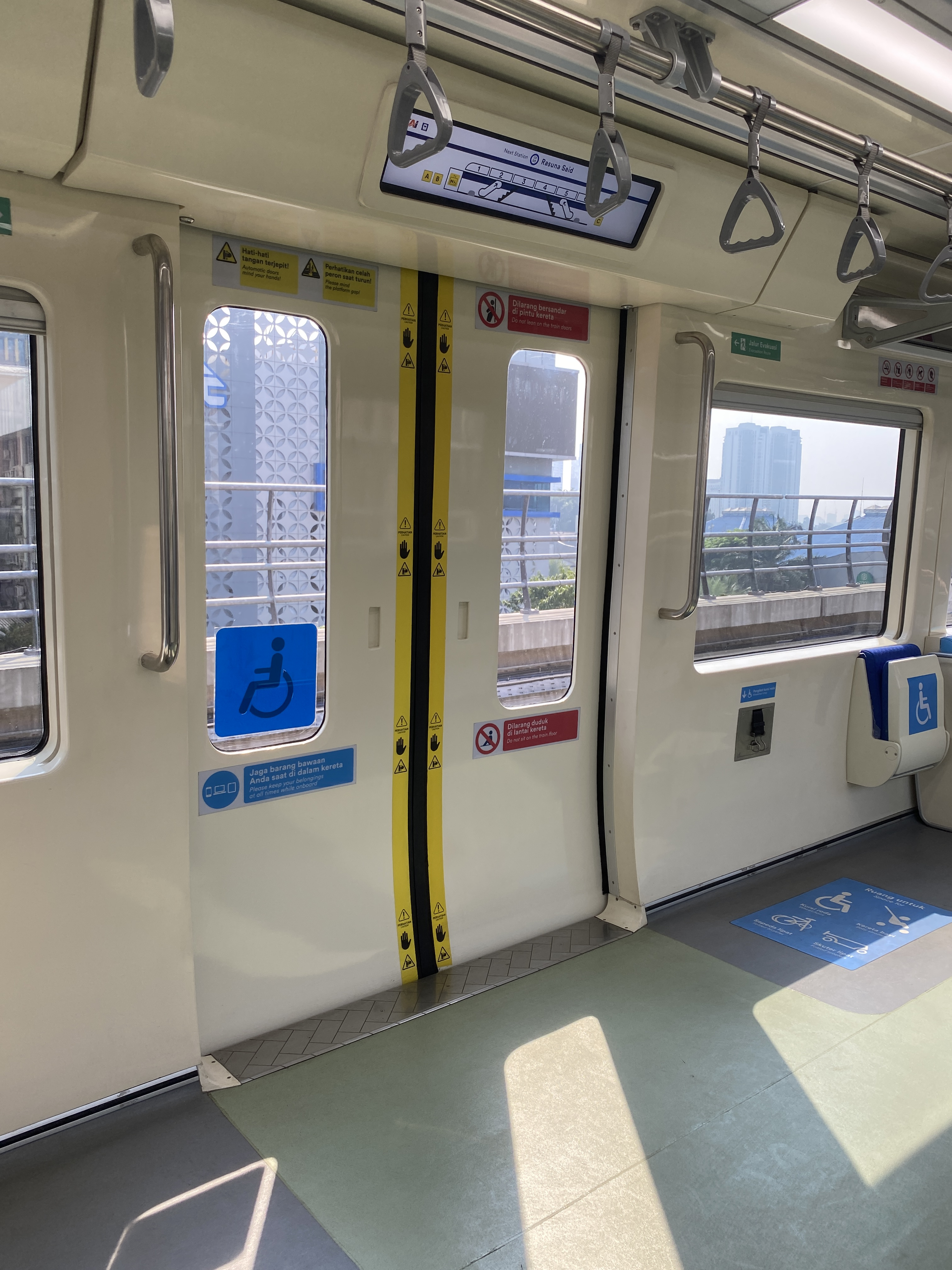
LRT Jabodebek Doors, Showing the PIDS Display

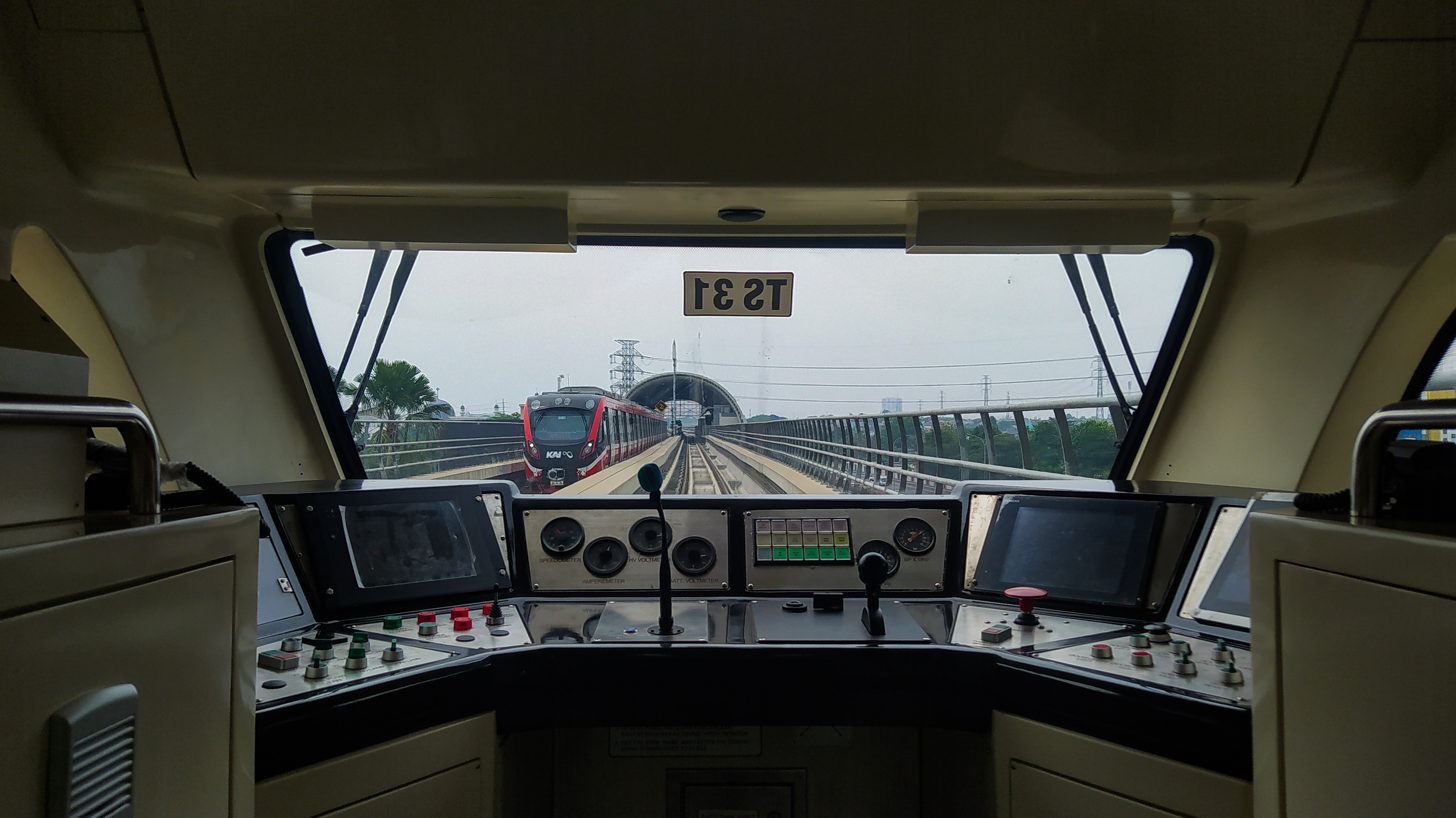
The cab of an LRT Jabodebek LRV

== Incidents ==
- A collision of two set of trains occurred during testing phase on 25 October 2021 between Harjamukti station and Ciracas station. Neither one of these trains were in service. As a result, the two trainsets involved in the collision were badly damaged, and the driver who was driving the train suffered minor injuries. The NTSC said that the cause of this incident was human error due to the engineer playing with their smartphone.
- On 30 August 2023, the system's third day of operations, several losses of power caused passengers to be trapped inside stopped trains with no air conditioning.

== See also ==
- Greater Jakarta Integrated Mass Transit System
- Transport in Jakarta
  - KRL Commuterline
  - Jakarta LRT
  - Jakarta MRT
  - TransJakarta
- Transport in Indonesia
- Rail transport in Indonesia
