= Karma (disambiguation) =

Karma, in several Eastern religions, is the concept of "action" or "deed", understood as that which causes the entire cycle of cause and effect.

Karma may also refer to:

== Computing ==
- KARMA attack, an attack capable of exploiting some WiFi systems
- Karma, a physics engine used in Unreal Engine 2
- Karma, a trust metric in online moderation or rating systems
  - Karma, the voting system on Reddit
- Karma spyware, an iPhone spyware tool used by Dark Matter

== Stage and screen ==
- Karma (1918 play), an English-language play
- Karma (1933 film), a Hindi- and English-language film
- Karma (1981 film), a Filipino drama film
- Karma (1986 film), an Indian Hindi film
- Karma (1995 film), a Malayalam film of 1995
- Karma (2008 Indian film), an English-language psychological thriller film
- Karma (2008 Indonesian film), a paranormal drama film
- Karma (2010 film), an Indian Telugu film
- Karma (2012 film), a Sinhala adult drama film
- Karma (2015 Thai film), a horror film
- Karma (2015 Tamil film), a murder mystery film
- Karma (2024 film), an Indian Odia-language action-thriller film
- Karma (2026 film), a French psychological thriller film
- Karma (American TV series), an American children's reality web series
- Karma (Hong Kong TV series), a Hong Kong horror television series
- Karma (Indian TV series), an Indian superhero television series
- Karma (South Korean TV series), a South Korean crime thriller television series
- "Karma" (How I Met Your Mother), a television episode
- "Karma" (Person of Interest), a television episode

== Music ==
- Karma (American band), a progressive rock/jazz band
- Karma Productions or Carvin & Ivan, a music production duo

=== Albums ===
- Karma (Delerium album) (1997)
- Karma (Robin Eubanks album) (1991)
- Karma (Fanatic Crisis album) (1994)
- Karma (Kamelot album) (2001)
- Karma (Mucc album) (2010)
- Karma (Myrath album) (2024)
- Karma (Pharoah Sanders album) (1969)
- Karma (Mike Singer album) (2017)
- Karma (Rick Springfield album) (1999)
- Karma (Stray Kids album) (2025)
- Karma (Tarkan album) (2001)
- Karma (Winger album) (2009)

=== Songs ===
- "Karma" (The Black Eyed Peas song), 1999
- "Karma" (Lloyd Banks song), 2004
- "Karma" (Alicia Keys song), 2004
- "Karma" (Bump of Chicken song), 2005
- "Karma" (Kokia song), 2009
- "Karma" (The Saturdays song), 2010
- "Karma" (Alma song), 2016
- "Karma" (AJR song), 2019
- "Karma" (Marina song), 2019
- "Karma" (Anxhela Peristeri song), 2021
- "Karma" (Taylor Swift song), 2022
- "Karma" (JoJo Siwa song), 2024
  - "Karma's a Bitch", Brit Smith's version of the song, 2024
- "Karma" (The Kolors song), 2024
- "Karma (What Goes Around)", by 1200 Techniques, 2002
- "Karma", by Opeth from My Arms, Your Hearse, 1998
- "Karma", by Diffuser from Mission: Impossible 2, 2000
- "Karma", by Jessica Andrews from Who I Am, 2001
- "Karma", by Kamelot from Karma, 2001
- "Karma", by deSol from deSol, 2005
- "Karma", by Darin from Flashback, 2008
- "Karma", by Faizal Tahir from Adrenalin, 2010
- "Karma", by Parkway Drive from Deep Blue, 2010
- "Karma", by Joss Stone from LP1, 2011
- "Karma", by Burhan G & L.O.C. from Din for Evigt, 2013
- "Karma", by Mike Singer from Karma, 2017
- "Karma", by Estelle from Lovers Rock, 2018
- "Karma", by Fear, and Loathing in Las Vegas from Hypertoughness, 2019
- "Karma", by The Reklaws from Sophomore Slump, 2020
- "Karma", by Ayra Starr from 19 & Dangerous, 2021
- "Karma", by Enhypen from Dark Blood, 2023
- "Karma", by Fairyland from The Story Remains, 2025
- "Karma", by Turmion Kätilöt from Resodance, 2026
- "Karma", by Wage War from It Calls Me by Name, 2026
- "Karma (Comes Back Around)", by Adam F from Kaos: The Anti-Acoustic Warfare, 2001

== People ==
=== Given name ===
- Karma (archer) (born 1990), Bhutanese archer
- Karma Chagme, 17th-century Tibetan lama
- Karma Phuntsho, Bhutanese scholar
- Karma Phuntsok (born 1952), Tibetan painter
- Karma Rigzin, Bhutanese police officer and UN peacekeeper
- Karma Thinley Rinpoche (born 1931), Tibetan lama resident in Canada
- Karma Thutob Namgyal (died 1610), prince of the Tsangpa dynasty that ruled parts of Central Tibet
- Karma Tsewang (born 1988), Indian footballer
- Karma Tshomo (born 1973), Bhutanese archer
- Karma Yonzon, Nepali musician and composer
- Karma-Ann Swanepoel, South African-born singer, as Karma

=== Nickname ===
- Karma (Call of Duty player) or Damon Barlow (born 1993)
- Karma (wrestler) (born 2001), Japanese professional wrestler

== Places ==
- Karma, Karma District, a village in Belarus
- Karma District, an administrative subdivision in Belarus
- Karma, Koderma, a census town in Koderma district, Jharkhand, Bihar
- Karma, Koderma, Jharkhand, India
- Karma, Niger
- Karma, Hebron, a Palestinian village
- Karma valley, a Himalayan valley, Tibet

== Vehicles ==
- Fisker Karma, a hybrid electric sportscar
  - Karma Revero, a hybrid electric sportscar that replaced the Fisker Karma
- GoPro Karma, an American camera drone
- Karma Automotive, an automaker

== Other uses ==
- Karma (character), a Marvel Comics superheroine
- Karma (telecom company), a WiFi-based ISP
- Karma Nightclub & Cabaret, a former gay nightclub in Lincoln, Nebraska
- Karma (novel), a 2014 novel by Karanam Pavan Prasad
- Karma (plant), a genus of flowering plants in the orchid family
- "Karma" (short story), a short story by Khushwant Singh
- Korg KARMA, a workstation, the first implementation of the KARMA music system
- Karma, a dog food brand of Procter & Gamble

== See also ==
- Karm (disambiguation)
- Karam (disambiguation)
- Karmah (disambiguation)
- Karra (disambiguation)
- Kamma (disambiguation), Pali form of karma
- Karma-Ann Swanepoel, lead singer of Henry Ate
- Karuma, a settlement in Uganda
- Kharma (wrestler) or Kia Stevens (born 1977), American professional wrestler and actress
- Kama, "desire, wish, longing" in Indian literature
