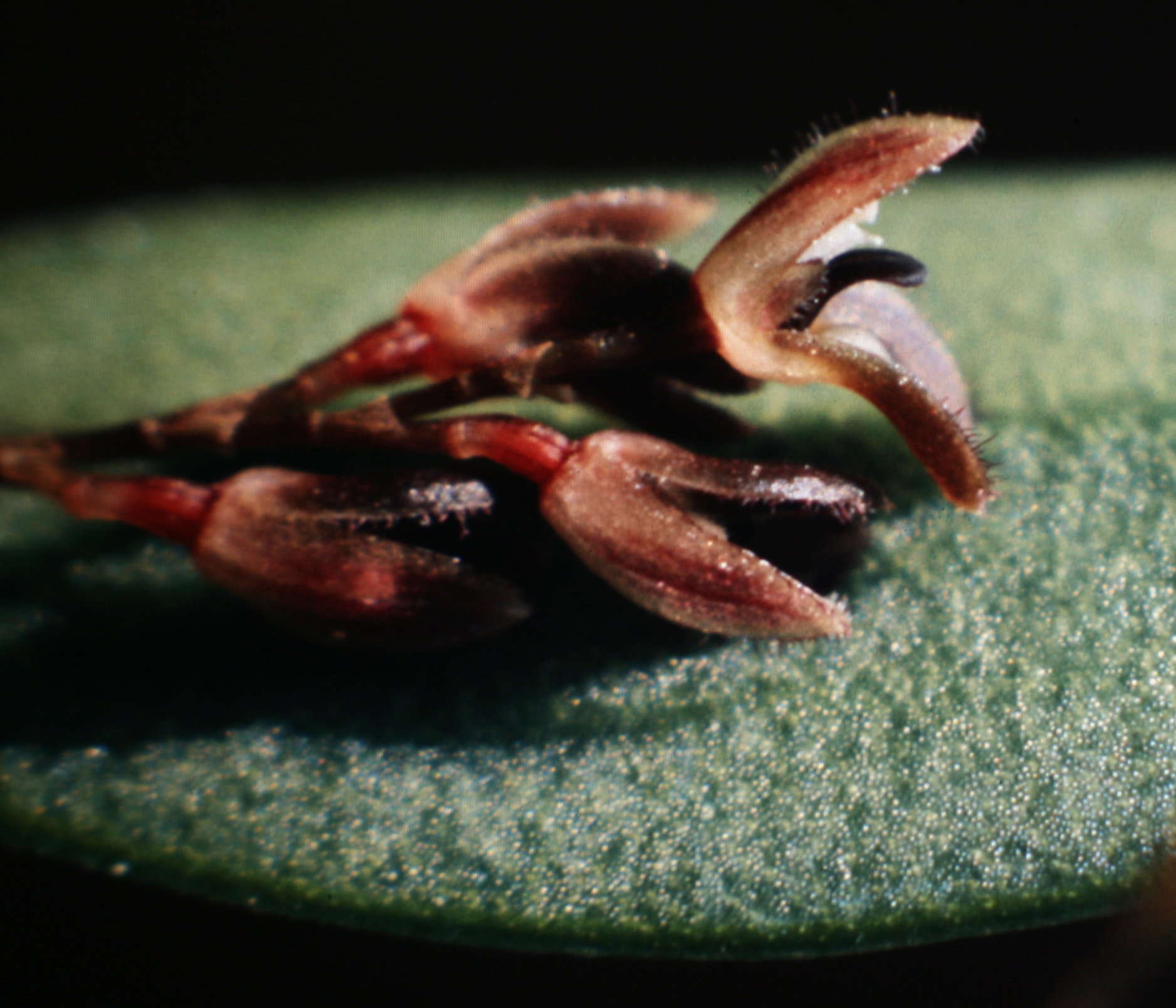
- Trichosalpinx ciliaris

Scientific classification
- Kingdom: Plantae
- Clade: Tracheophytes
- Clade: Angiosperms
- Clade: Monocots
- Order: Asparagales
- Family: Orchidaceae
- Subfamily: Epidendroideae
- Tribe: Epidendreae
- Subtribe: Pleurothallidinae
- Genus: Trichosalpinx; Luer (1983)

Species
- See text

Synonyms
- Pseudolepanthes (Luer) Archila (2000 publ. 2009)

= Trichosalpinx =

Bonnet orchid

Genus of orchids

Trichosalpinx, commonly known as the bonnet orchid, is a genus of neotropical orchids containing 38 species. The genus is widespread across most of Latin America from northern Mexico to Bolivia, as well as the West Indies.

Trichosalpinx is characterized by the presence of a ringed, ribbed sheath around the stem. The generic name means "trumpet with hair" and refers to this ring.

The genus formerly included over 100 species. Phylogenetic studies concluded that the genus as formerly circumscribed to be polyphyletic, and in 2023 many species were placed in the newly-described genus Karma.

== Species ==
Species accepted by the Plants of the World Online as of July 2024.

- Trichosalpinx acestrochila Luer
- Trichosalpinx blaisdellii (S.Watson) Luer
- Trichosalpinx bricenoensis Luer & R.Escobar
- Trichosalpinx calceolaris Luer & R.Escobar
- Trichosalpinx carinatus Rykacz., Szlach. & Kolan.
- Trichosalpinx caudata Luer & R.Escobar
- Trichosalpinx ciliaris (Lindl.) Luer
- Trichosalpinx cryptantha (Barb.Rodr.) Luer
- Trichosalpinx deceptrix Carnevali & I.Ramírez
- Trichosalpinx decorata Luer & R.Escobar
- Trichosalpinx dentialae D.E.Benn. & Christenson
- Trichosalpinx diazii Beutelsp. & Mor.-Mol.
- Trichosalpinx egleri (Pabst) Luer
- Trichosalpinx inquisiviensis (Luer & R.Vásquez) Luer
- Trichosalpinx memor (Rchb.f.) Luer
- Trichosalpinx minutipetala (Ames & C.Schweinf.) Luer
- Trichosalpinx navarrensis (Ames) Mora-Ret. & García Castro
- Trichosalpinx ollgaardiana Rykacz., Kolan. & Szlach.
- Trichosalpinx orbicularis (Lindl.) Luer
- Trichosalpinx pandurata D.E.Benn. & Christenson
- Trichosalpinx pringlei (Schltr.) Luer
- Trichosalpinx pseudolepanthes Luer & R.Escobar
- Trichosalpinx psilantha Luer
- Trichosalpinx ramosii Luer
- Trichosalpinx reflexa Mel.Fernández & Bogarín
- Trichosalpinx ringens Luer
- Trichosalpinx roraimensis (Rolfe) Luer
- Trichosalpinx rotundata (C.Schweinf.) Dressler
- Trichosalpinx sanctuarii Mel.Fernández & Bogarín
- Trichosalpinx semilunata (Luer) Luer
- Trichosalpinx silverstonei Luer
- Trichosalpinx spathulata Luer
- Trichosalpinx trachystoma (Schltr.) Luer
- Trichosalpinx triangulipetala (Ames & Correll) Luer
- Trichosalpinx uvaria Luer
- Trichosalpinx xiphochila (Rchb.f.) Luer
- Trichosalpinx zunagensis Luer & Hirtz

=== Formerly placed here ===
- Karma montana (Barb.Rodr.) Karremans (as Trichosalpinx montana (Barb.Rodr.) Luer)
