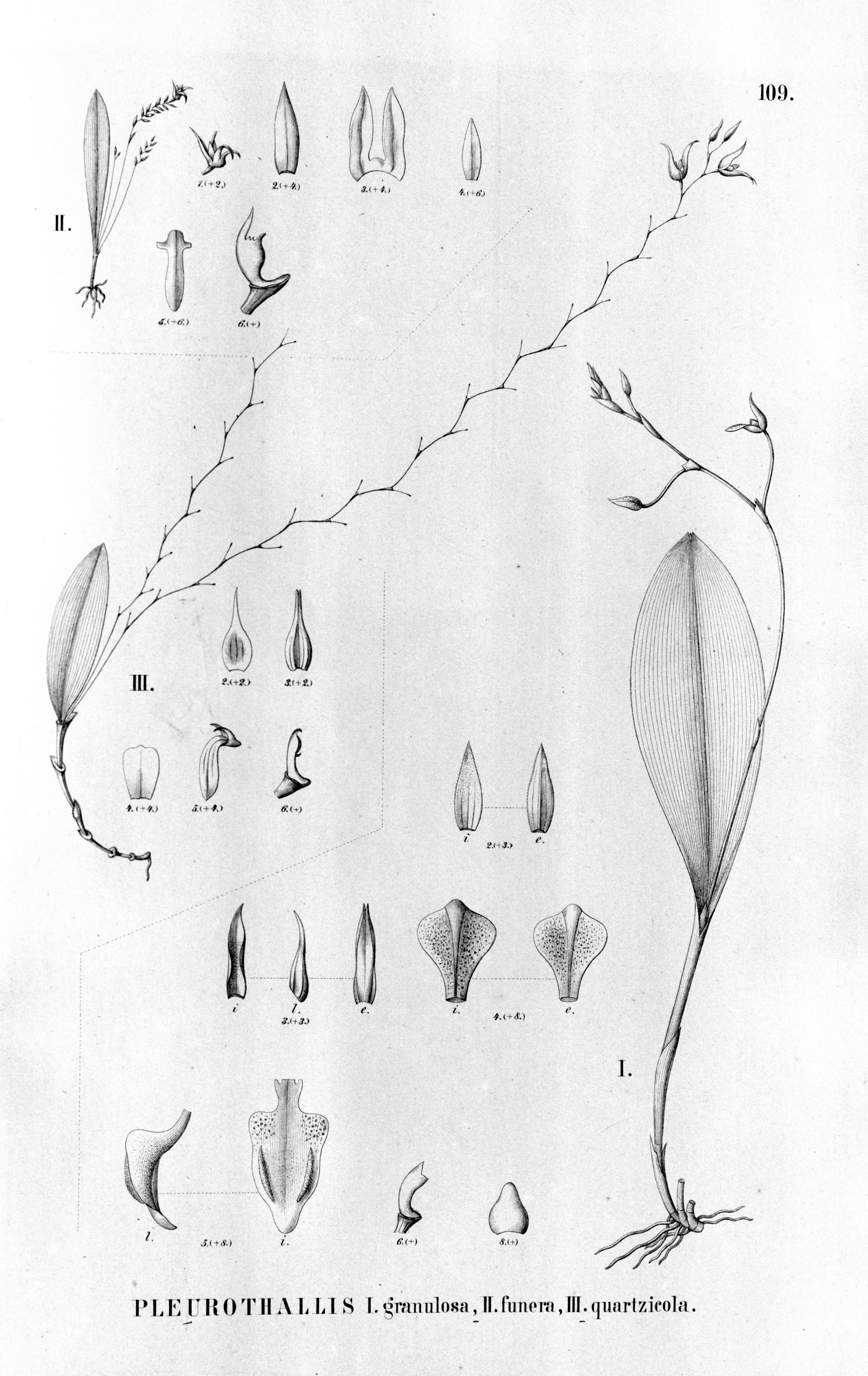
- Illustrations of Pabstiella granulosa, Anathallis funerea, and Karma montana in Flora Brasiliensis

Scientific classification
- Kingdom: Plantae
- Clade: Tracheophytes
- Clade: Angiosperms
- Clade: Monocots
- Order: Asparagales
- Family: Orchidaceae
- Subfamily: Epidendroideae
- Genus: Anathallis
- Species: A. funerea

Binomial name
- Anathallis funerea (Barb.Rodr.) Luer

Synonyms
- Anathallis breviscapa (C.Schweinf.) Pridgeon & M.W.Chase; Lepanthes funerea Barb.Rodr.; Panmorphia funerea (Barb.Rodr.) Luer; Pleurothallis breviscapa C.Schweinf.; Pleurothallis funerea (Barb.Rodr.) Cogn.; Pleurothallis praemorsa Luer; Specklinia breviscapa (C.Schweinf.) Luer; Specklinia funerea (Barb.Rodr.) Luer; Specklinia praemorsa (Luer) Luer

= Anathallis funerea =

Species of plant

Anathallis funerea is a species of orchid plant. It is an epiphyte native to tropical South America and Panama.
