= Slap in the Face =

Slap in the Face may refer to:

- Slap in the Face (film), a 1970 West German comedy film
- Slap in the Face (album), an album by Henry Ate
