= A. graveolens =

A. graveolens may refer to:

- Anathallis graveolens, an orchid species
- Anethum graveolens, the dill, a cultivated plant species
- Apium graveolens, the celery, a cultivated plant species
- Astronium graveolens, a flowering tree species native to Central America and South America
