= A. imbricata =

A. imbricata may refer to:

- Anathallis imbricata, an orchid species
- Araucaria imbricata, a synonym for Araucaria araucana, the monkey-puzzle, a conifer species native to south-central Chile and west central Argentina
- Arctostaphylos imbricata, the San Bruno Mountain manzanita, a plant species endemic to San Mateo County, California

== See also ==
- Imbricata
