= Kamma =

Kamma may refer to:

- Kamma (caste), a caste or social group found largely in Southern India.
- Kamma, India, village in Punjab, India
- The Pali and Ardhamagadhi term for karma
- Bava Kamma, a traditional Jewish civil law procedure (1st volume of Nezikin), dealing largely with damages and compensation
- The nickname of the Norwegian football club Hamarkameratene
- A locality near Cairns in the state of Queensland, Australia.
- A mountain range in Pershing County, Nevada, USA
- Name of a mountain creek in the province of British Columbia, Canada
- Kamma Rahbek, Danish artist, salonist and lady of letters

== See also ==
- Karma (disambiguation)
