= Karanam (surname) =

Karanam (also spelled as Karnam) is a surname native to the Indian states of Andhra Pradesh and Telangana.

== Notable people ==
Notable people with the surname include:

- Karanam Balaram Krishna Murthy - Indian politician from Andhra Pradesh.
- Karanam Pavan Prasad - Indian author, artist and playwright in Kannada language.
- Karnam Malleswari - Indian weightlifter.
