= Anathallis subnulla =

Scientific classification
- Kingdom: Plantae
- Clade: Tracheophytes
- Clade: Angiosperms
- Clade: Monocots
- Order: Asparagales
- Family: Orchidaceae
- Subfamily: Epidendroideae
- Genus: Anathallis
- Species: A. subnulla

Binomial name
- Anathallis subnulla (Luer & Toscano) F.Barros

Synonyms
- Pleurothallis subnulla Luer & Toscano

Species of plant

Anathallis subnulla is a species of orchid plant native to Brazil.
