= Anathallis fastigiata =

Scientific classification
- Kingdom: Plantae
- Clade: Tracheophytes
- Clade: Angiosperms
- Clade: Monocots
- Order: Asparagales
- Family: Orchidaceae
- Subfamily: Epidendroideae
- Genus: Anathallis
- Species: A. fastigiata

Binomial name
- Anathallis fastigiata (Luer & Toscano) Luer

Synonyms
- Pleurothallis fastigiata Luer & Toscano

Species of plant

Anathallis fastigiata is a species of orchid plant native to Costa Rica.
