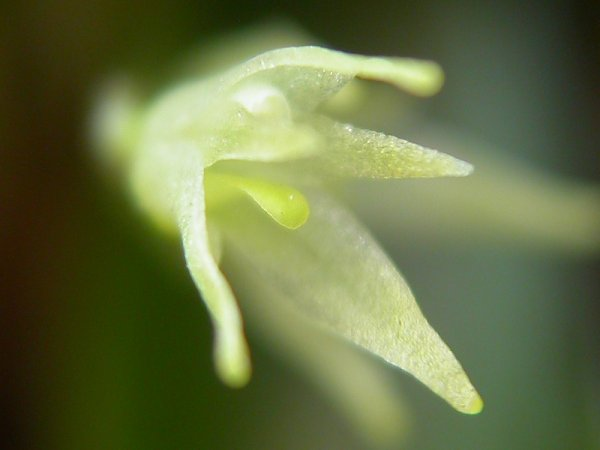

Scientific classification
- Kingdom: Plantae
- Clade: Tracheophytes
- Clade: Angiosperms
- Clade: Monocots
- Order: Asparagales
- Family: Orchidaceae
- Subfamily: Epidendroideae
- Genus: Anathallis
- Species: A. aristulata

Binomial name
- Anathallis aristulata (Lindl.) Luer(2007)

Synonyms
- Pleurothallis aristulata Lindl. (1859) (Basionym); Specklinia aristulata (Lindl.) Luer (2004)

= Anathallis aristulata =

Species of orchid

Anathallis aristulata is a species of orchid found in South America.
