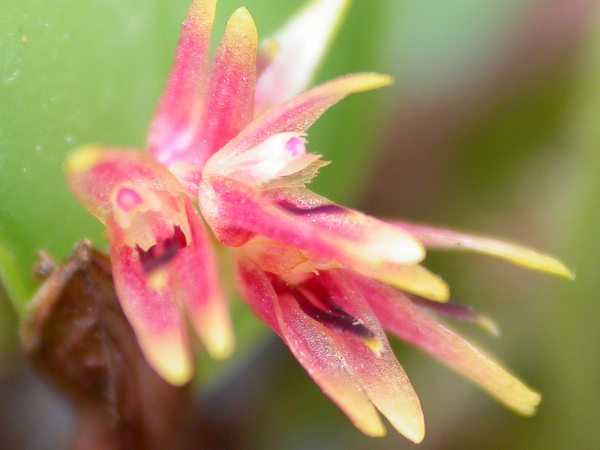
- Trichosalpinx orbicularis flower

Scientific classification
- Kingdom: Plantae
- Clade: Tracheophytes
- Clade: Angiosperms
- Clade: Monocots
- Order: Asparagales
- Family: Orchidaceae
- Subfamily: Epidendroideae
- Genus: Trichosalpinx
- Species: T. orbicularis

Binomial name
- Trichosalpinx orbicularis (Lindl.) Luer

Synonyms
- Specklinia orbicularis Lindl. (basionym); Pleurothallis orbicularis (Lindl.) Lindl.; Pleurothallis biflora H.Focke; Lepanthes orbiculata Lindl. ex Rchb.f.; Humboldtia biflora (H.Focke) Kuntze; Humboldtia orbicularis (Lindl.) Kuntze; Pleurothallis trachytheca F.Lehm. & Kraenzl.; Pleurothallis lancifera Schltr.; Trichosalpinx lancifera (Schltr.) Luer; Trichosalpinx oxychilos Carnevali & G.A.Romero

= Trichosalpinx orbicularis =

Species of orchid

Trichosalpinx orbicularis is a species of orchid found from the Lesser Antilles, Costa Rica, and Panama in the north into Peru and Brazil in the south.
