= On My Way (deSoL album) =

Studio album by deSoL
- Released: August 7, 2007
- Recorded: 2007
- Studios: Lakehouse Recording, Asbury Park, NJ
- Genre: Rock/Latin rock
- Length: 50:45
- Label: saZon Records
- Producer: Jon Leidersdorff/deSoL

DeSoL chronology
'LiVe/ViVo' (2006)	On My Way (2007)

On My Way is the second studio album release by New Jersey Latin rock band, deSoL.

The album had its start while the band took a month off from touring in January 2006. After the success of their AAA top 10 single, Karma and a lengthy tour, the band started 2006 with a trip to Texas. They spent a month at Sonic Ranch, a boutique recording studio in the middle of a Pecan farm outside El Paso. With the benefit of isolation and virtually no phone service, the band spent their days rehearsing and working on writing new material inspired by their travels of the previous 2–3 years. A collection of 20 songs arose out of these informal sessions and demos were recorded by the band. This album was created and financed independently after the band left their previous label, CURB Records. The band then set about recording the album back in New Jersey with producer Jon Leidersdorff at his Lakehouse Recording Studio in Asbury Park. The cover photo is a detail of a live photo taken by tour manager Jessica Erickson during a show in Boston.

== Track listing ==
1. "On My Way" 3:25 (Monterrosa/Guerrero/Letke/Leidersdorff)
2. "Letter From San Juan" 2:56 (Monterrosa/Apple)
3. "Sing It All Night" 3:24 (Monterrosa/Apple/Leidersdorff)
4. "Mona Lisa" 4:29 (Monterrosa/Guerrero/Leidersdorff)
5. "Every Little Love Song" 3:47 (Monterrosa/Leidersdorff)
6. "Good Night Love" 3:25 (Monterrosa/Leidersdorff)
7. "Ghost In The House of Texas" 4:09 (Monterrosa/Apple/Leidersdorff)
8. "Santos" 3:32 (Monterrosa/Apple/Guerrero/Leidersdorff)
9. "El Salvador" 3:14 (Monterrosa/Leidersdorff)
10. "Teardrops" 3:38 (Monterrosa/Leidersdorff/Greenberg)
11. "Lagrimas" 3:13 (Monterrosa/Guillen/Leidersdorff)
12. "Vivir en tu Aire" 4:27 (Monterrosa/Leidersdorff)
13. "Free Again" 3:14 (Monterrosa/Apple/Leidersdorff)
14. "Todo Mi Cancion (Sing It All Night, Spanish version)" 3:32 (Monterrosa/Apple/Leidersdorff_

== Personnel ==
deSoL

- Albie Monterrosa – acoustic and electric guitars, piano, lead vocals
- Andy Letke – piano, organ, banjo, vocals
- James Guerrero – percussion, vocals
- Chris Apple – bass guitar, vocals, trumpet

Additional personnel:

- Kevin Ansell – electric and acoustic, vocals
- Ray Turull – timbales, percussion
- Jon Leidersdorff – drums
- Eric Novad – drums on "On My Way" and "Santos"
- Carmireli – co-lead vocals on "Teardrops"
- Michael Ramos – accordion on "Free Again"
- Kevin Patrick – strings and additional keyboards

== Production ==
- Producer: Jon Leidersdorff
- Engineers: Rob Lebret
- Mastered by: Tom Ruff

== Charts ==
Singles

Year	Single	Chart	Position
2007	"Sing It All Night"	Triple A	6
2008	"On My Way"	Triple A
