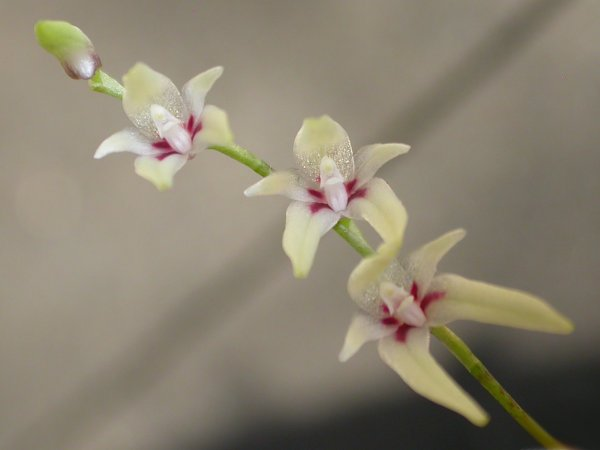

Scientific classification
- Kingdom: Plantae
- Clade: Tracheophytes
- Clade: Angiosperms
- Clade: Monocots
- Order: Asparagales
- Family: Orchidaceae
- Subfamily: Epidendroideae
- Genus: Anathallis
- Species: A. pubipetala

Binomial name
- Anathallis pubipetala (Hoehne) Pridgeon & M.W. Chase (2001)

Synonyms
- Pleurothallis pubipetala Hoehne (1930) (basionym); Specklinia pubipetala (Hoehne) Luer (2004)

= Anathallis pubipetala =

Species of orchid

Anathallis pubipetala is a species of orchid.
