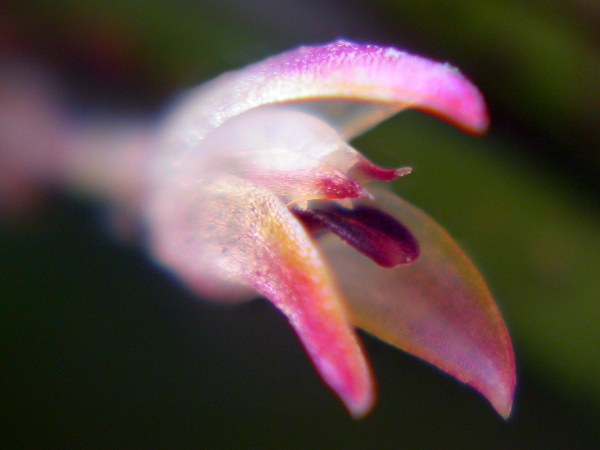

Scientific classification
- Kingdom: Plantae
- Clade: Tracheophytes
- Clade: Angiosperms
- Clade: Monocots
- Order: Asparagales
- Family: Orchidaceae
- Subfamily: Epidendroideae
- Genus: Anathallis
- Species: A. microphyta

Binomial name
- Anathallis microphyta (Barb.Rodr.) C.O. Azevedo & Van den Berg (2005)

Synonyms
- Lepanthes microphyta Barb.Rodr. (1881) (Basionym); Pleurothallis microphyta (Barb.Rodr.) Cogn. (1896); Specklinia microphyta (Barb.Rodr.) Luer (2004); Panmorphia microphyta (Barb.Rodr.) Luer (2006)

= Anathallis microphyta =

Species of orchid

Anathallis microphyta is a species of orchid.
