= Anathallis trullilabia =

Scientific classification
- Kingdom: Plantae
- Clade: Tracheophytes
- Clade: Angiosperms
- Clade: Monocots
- Order: Asparagales
- Family: Orchidaceae
- Subfamily: Epidendroideae
- Genus: Anathallis
- Species: A. trullilabia

Binomial name
- Anathallis trullilabia (Pabst) F.Barros

Synonyms
- Pleurothallis trullilabia Pabst

Species of plant

Anathallis trullilabia is a species of orchid plant native to Brazil.
