= Anathallis jordanensis =

Scientific classification
- Kingdom: Plantae
- Clade: Tracheophytes
- Clade: Angiosperms
- Clade: Monocots
- Order: Asparagales
- Family: Orchidaceae
- Subfamily: Epidendroideae
- Genus: Anathallis
- Species: A. jordanensis

Binomial name
- Anathallis jordanensis (Hoehne) F.Barros

Synonyms
- Pleurothallis jordanensis Hoehne

Species of plant

Anathallis jordanensis is a species of orchid plant native to Brazil.
