= Anathallis adrianae =

Scientific classification
- Kingdom: Plantae
- Clade: Tracheophytes
- Clade: Angiosperms
- Clade: Monocots
- Order: Asparagales
- Family: Orchidaceae
- Subfamily: Epidendroideae
- Genus: Anathallis
- Species: A. adrianae

Binomial name
- Anathallis adrianae (Luer & Sijm) Karremans

Synonyms
- Pleurothallis adrianae Luer & Sijm

Species of plant

Anathallis adrianae is a species of orchid plant native to Ecuador.
