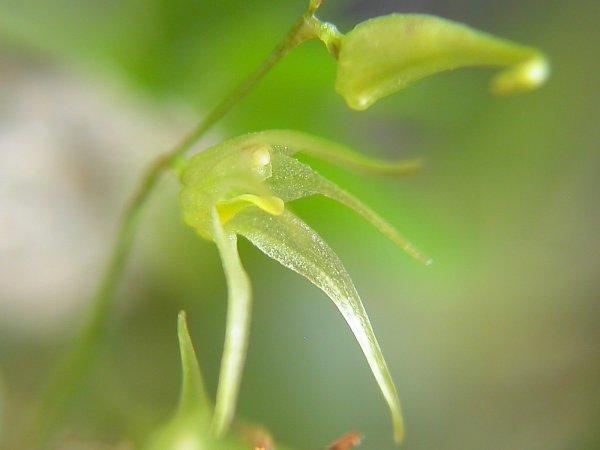

Scientific classification
- Kingdom: Plantae
- Clade: Tracheophytes
- Clade: Angiosperms
- Clade: Monocots
- Order: Asparagales
- Family: Orchidaceae
- Subfamily: Epidendroideae
- Genus: Anathallis
- Species: A. ferdinandiana

Binomial name
- Anathallis ferdinandiana (Barb.Rodr.) F. Barros (2003)

Synonyms
- Lepanthes ferdinandiana Barb.Rodr. (1881) (Basionym); Pleurothallis ferdinandiana (Barb.Rodr.) Cogn. (1896)

= Anathallis ferdinandiana =

Species of orchid

Anathallis ferdinandiana is a species of orchid.
