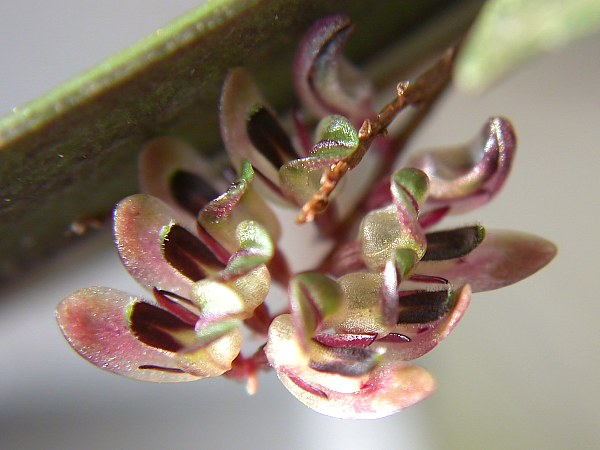
- Trichosalpinx egleri flowers

Scientific classification
- Kingdom: Plantae
- Clade: Tracheophytes
- Clade: Angiosperms
- Clade: Monocots
- Order: Asparagales
- Family: Orchidaceae
- Subfamily: Epidendroideae
- Genus: Trichosalpinx
- Species: T. egleri

Binomial name
- Trichosalpinx egleri (Pabst) Luer

Synonyms
- Pleurothallis egleri Pabst

= Trichosalpinx egleri =

Species of plant

Trichosalpinx egleri is a species of orchid native to southern tropical America (Venezuela, Peru, Brazil, Bolivia, Suriname, Guyana, French Guiana and the Caribbean).
