= Anathallis caudatipetala =

Scientific classification
- Kingdom: Plantae
- Clade: Tracheophytes
- Clade: Angiosperms
- Clade: Monocots
- Order: Asparagales
- Family: Orchidaceae
- Subfamily: Epidendroideae
- Genus: Anathallis
- Species: A. caudatipetala

Binomial name
- Anathallis caudatipetala (C.Schweinf.) Luer

Synonyms
- Pleurothallis caudatipetala C.Schweinf.

Species of plant

Anathallis caudatipetala is a species of orchid plant native to Peru.
