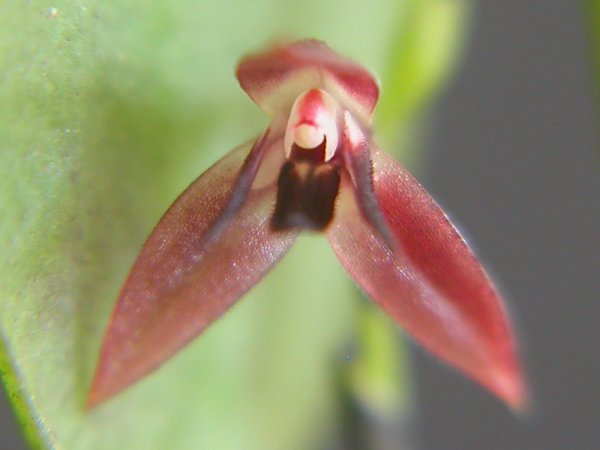

Scientific classification
- Kingdom: Plantae
- Clade: Tracheophytes
- Clade: Angiosperms
- Clade: Monocots
- Order: Asparagales
- Family: Orchidaceae
- Subfamily: Epidendroideae
- Genus: Anathallis
- Species: A. modesta

Binomial name
- Anathallis modesta (Barb.Rodr.) Pridgeon & M.W. Chase (2001)

Synonyms
- Lepanthes modesta Barb.Rodr. (1881) (Basionym); Pleurothallis modesta (Barb.Rodr.) Cogn. (1896); Specklinia modesta (Barb.Rodr.) Luer (2004)

= Anathallis modesta =

Species of orchid

Anathallis modesta is a species of orchid.
