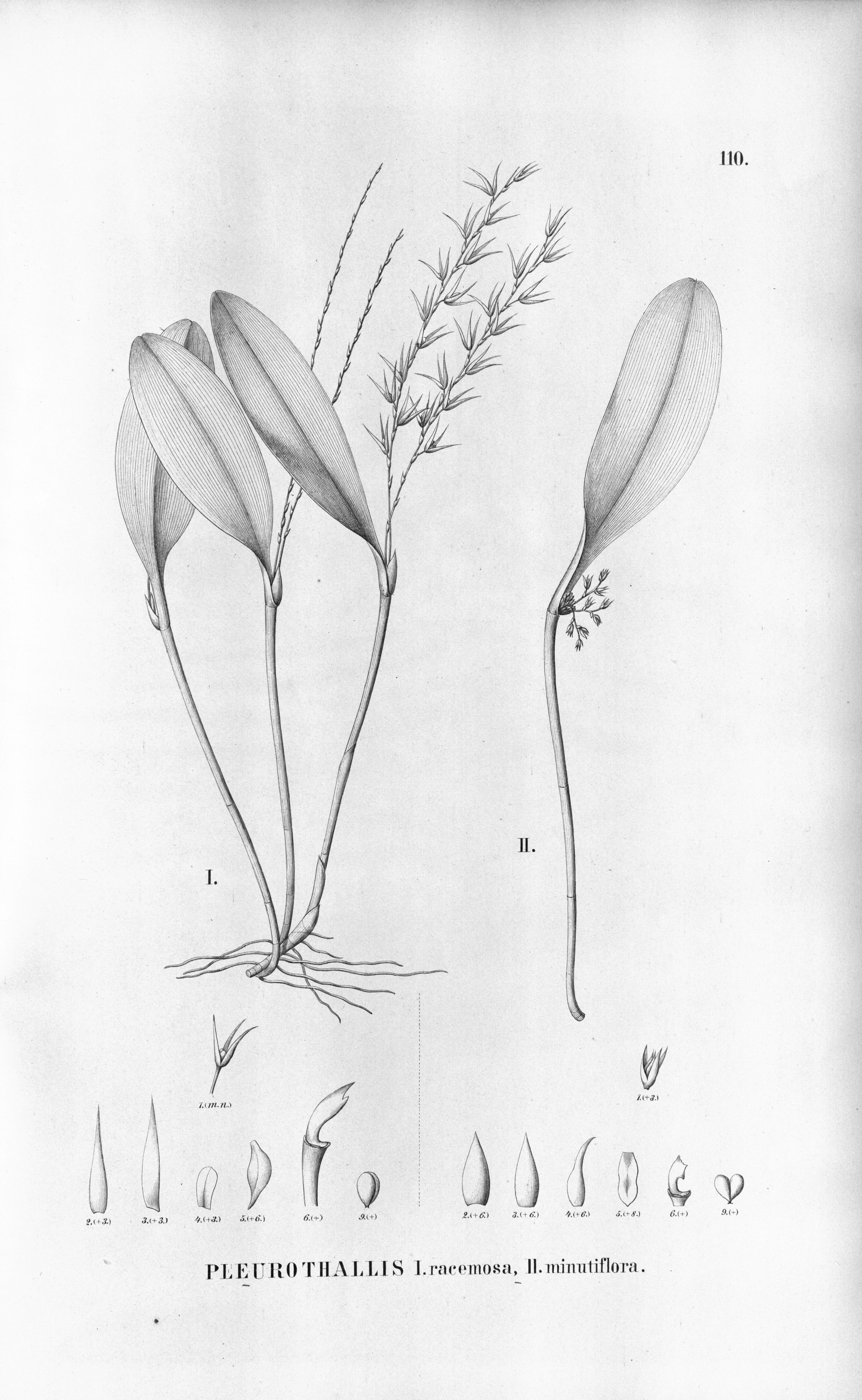
- Illustration by Alfred Cogniaux

Scientific classification
- Kingdom: Plantae
- Clade: Tracheophytes
- Clade: Angiosperms
- Clade: Monocots
- Order: Asparagales
- Family: Orchidaceae
- Subfamily: Epidendroideae
- Genus: Anathallis
- Species: A. acuminata

Binomial name
- Anathallis acuminata (Kunth) Pridgeon & M.W.Chase

Synonyms
- Pleurothallis asperilinguis Rchb.f. & Warsz.

= Anathallis acuminata =

Species of orchid

Anathallis acuminata is a species of orchid plant native to Peru.
