= Anathallis montipelladensis =

Scientific classification
- Kingdom: Plantae
- Clade: Tracheophytes
- Clade: Angiosperms
- Clade: Monocots
- Order: Asparagales
- Family: Orchidaceae
- Subfamily: Epidendroideae
- Genus: Anathallis
- Species: A. montipelladensis

Binomial name
- Anathallis montipelladensis (Hoehne) F.Barros

Synonyms
- Pleurothallis montipelladensis Hoehne; Specklinia montipelladensis (Hoehne) Luer

Species of orchid

Anathallis montipelladensis is a species of orchid from Brazil first described by Frederico Carlos Hoehne in 1929. Pleurothalis montipelladensis and Specklinia montipelladensis are synonyms.
