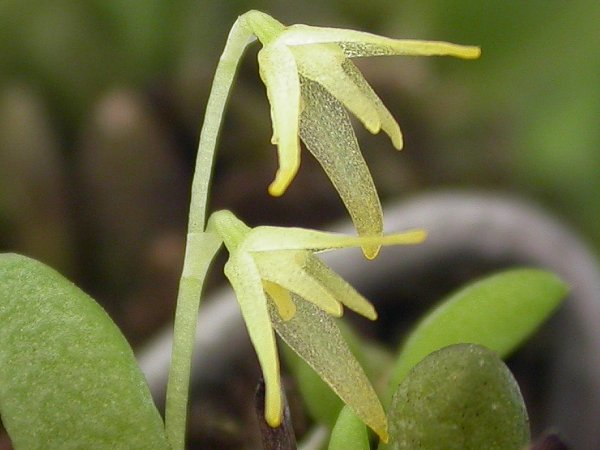

Scientific classification
- Kingdom: Plantae
- Clade: Tracheophytes
- Clade: Angiosperms
- Clade: Monocots
- Order: Asparagales
- Family: Orchidaceae
- Subfamily: Epidendroideae
- Genus: Anathallis
- Species: A. ourobranquensis

Binomial name
- Anathallis ourobranquensis Campacci & Menini (2005)

= Anathallis ourobranquensis =

Species of orchid

Anathallis ourobranquensis is a species of orchid.
