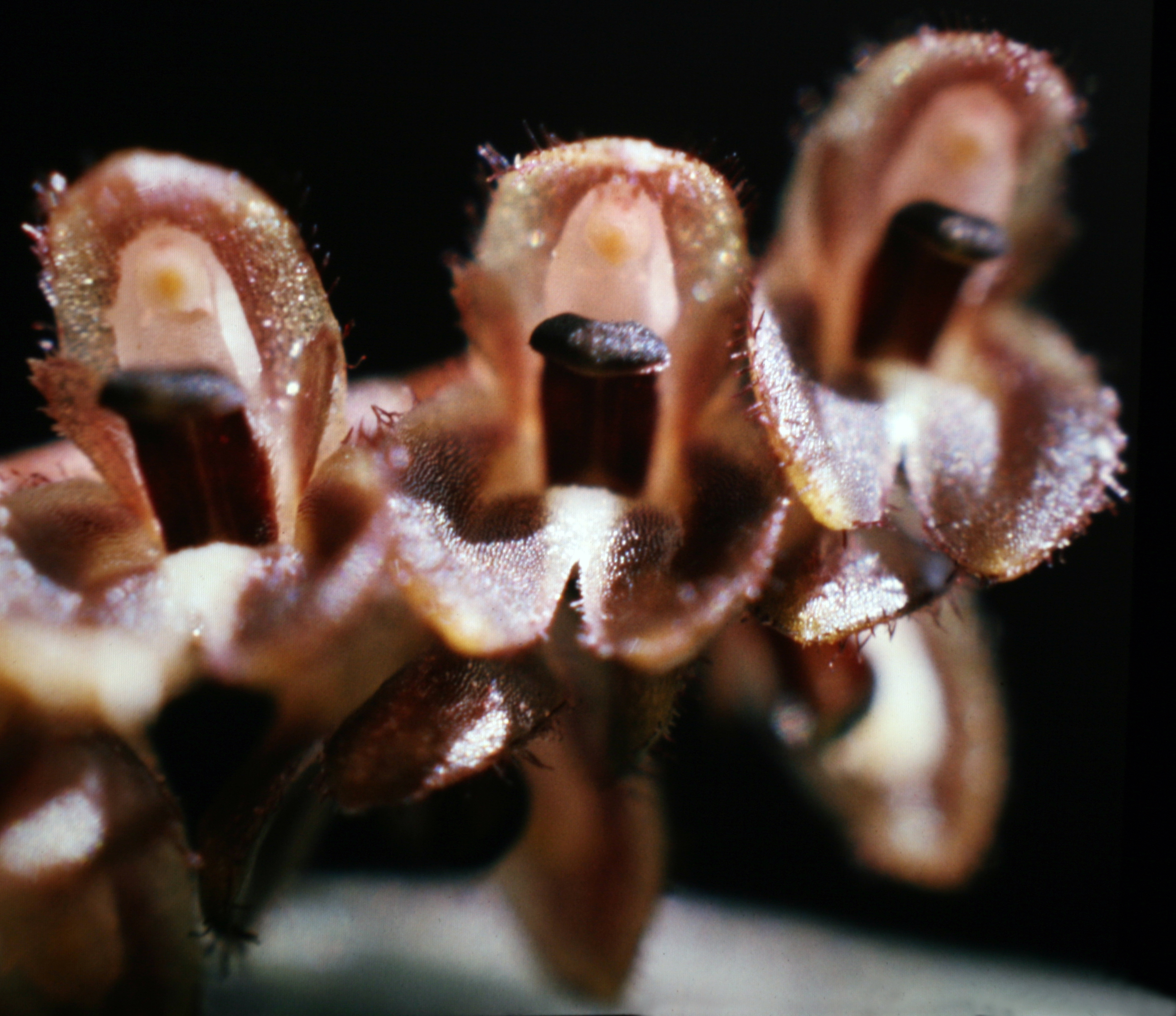

Scientific classification
- Kingdom: Plantae
- Clade: Tracheophytes
- Clade: Angiosperms
- Clade: Monocots
- Order: Asparagales
- Family: Orchidaceae
- Subfamily: Epidendroideae
- Genus: Trichosalpinx
- Species: T. ciliaris

Binomial name
- Trichosalpinx ciliaris (Lindl.) Luer

Synonyms
- Specklinia ciliaris Lindl.; Pleurothallis lepanthiformis Rchb.f.; Humboldtia lepanthiformis (Rchb.f.) Kuntze; Pleurothallis purpusii Schltr.; Pleurothallis ciliaris (Lindl.) L.O.Williams

= Trichosalpinx ciliaris =

Species of plant

Trichosalpinx ciliaris is a species of orchid found from Mexico, Belize, Central America and down to Brazil (Roraima).
