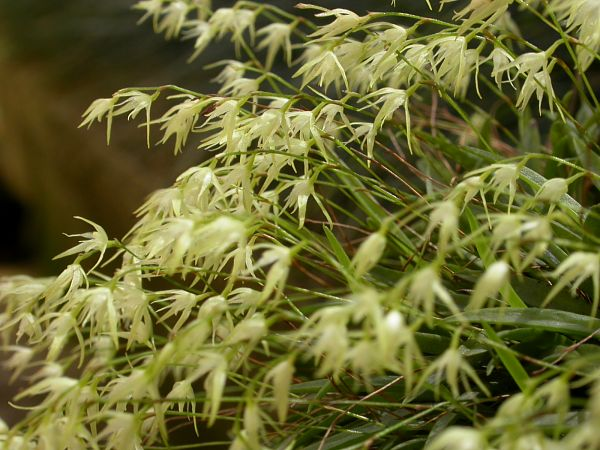

Scientific classification
- Kingdom: Plantae
- Clade: Tracheophytes
- Clade: Angiosperms
- Clade: Monocots
- Order: Asparagales
- Family: Orchidaceae
- Subfamily: Epidendroideae
- Genus: Anathallis
- Species: A. linearifolia

Binomial name
- Anathallis linearifolia (Cogn.) Pridgeon & M.W.Chase (2001)

Synonyms
- Pleurothallis linearifolia Cogn. (1896) (Basionym); Anathallis margaritifera (Schltr.) Pridgeon & M.W. Chase (2001); Pleurothallis bupleurifolia Porsch (1905); Pleurothallis convallium Kraenzl. (1921); Pleurothallis convergens R.C.J. Gerard (1900); Pleurothallis depauperata Cogn. (1896).; Pleurothallis eugenii Pabst (1956); Pleurothallis glossochila Kraenzl. (1921); Pleurothallis linearifolia Cogn. (1896); Pleurothallis margaritifera Schltr. (1918); Pleurothallis rigidula Cogn. (1896).; Specklinia bupleurifolia (Porsch) Luer (2004); Specklinia depauperata (Cogn.) F. Barros (1983); Specklinia eugenii (Pabst) Luer (2004); Specklinia linearifolia (Cogn.) Luer (2004); Specklinia rigidula (Cogn.) Luer (2004)

= Anathallis linearifolia =

Species of orchid

Anathallis linearifolia is a species of orchid.
