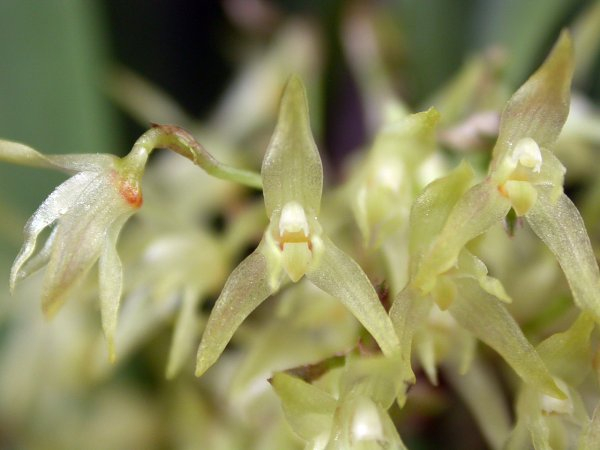

Scientific classification
- Kingdom: Plantae
- Clade: Tracheophytes
- Clade: Angiosperms
- Clade: Monocots
- Order: Asparagales
- Family: Orchidaceae
- Subfamily: Epidendroideae
- Genus: Anathallis
- Species: A. obovata

Binomial name
- Anathallis obovata (Lindl.) Pridgeon & M.W.Chase (2001)

Synonyms
- Pleurothallis obovata (Lindl.) Lindl. (1842) (Basionym); Anathallis citrina (Schltr.) Pridgeon & M.W.Chase (2001); Anathallis dendrophila (Rchb.f.) Pridgeon & M.W.Chase (2001); Anathallis densiflora Barb.Rodr.(1881); Anathallis fasciculata Barb.Rodr.(1877); Anathallis guentheri (Schltr.) Pridgeon & M.W.Chase (2001); Anathallis micrantha Barb.Rodr. (1881); Anathallis osmosperma Barb.Rodr.(1881); Humboldtia dendrophila (Rchb.f.) Kuntze (1891); Humboldtia obovata (Lindl.) Kuntze, (1891); Pleurothallis albida Lindl. (1858); Pleurothallis angustilabia Hoehne & Schltr. (1926); Pleurothallis brachyantha Schltr. (1924); Pleurothallis citrina Schltr. (1920); Pleurothallis dendrophila Rchb.f. (1850); Pleurothallis densiflora (Barb.Rodr.) Cogn.(1896); Pleurothallis densiflora var. parvifolia Garay, Arch.(1953); Pleurothallis fasciculata (Barb.Rodr.) Cogn. (1896); Pleurothallis guentheri Schltr., Repert.(1929); Pleurothallis minutiflora Cogn. (1896); Pleurothallis modestiflora Schltr.(1925); Pleurothallis obovata (1842); Pleurothallis octomeriiformis Rchb.f. (1854); Pleurothallis osmosperma (Barb.Rodr.) Cogn. (1896); Pleurothallis stenoglossa Pabst (1956); Specklinia citrina (Schltr.) Luer (2004); Specklinia obovata Lindl. (1839); Stelis fasciculiflora Regel(1871)

= Anathallis obovata =

Species of orchid

Anathallis obovata, the South American bonnet orchid, is a species of orchid.
