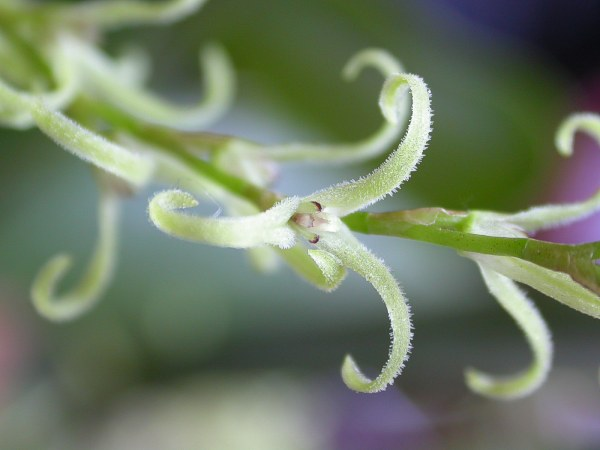

Scientific classification
- Kingdom: Plantae
- Clade: Tracheophytes
- Clade: Angiosperms
- Clade: Monocots
- Order: Asparagales
- Family: Orchidaceae
- Subfamily: Epidendroideae
- Genus: Anathallis
- Species: A. sclerophylla

Binomial name
- Anathallis sclerophylla (Lindl.) Pridgeon & M.W. Chase (2001)

Synonyms
- Pleurothallis sclerophylla Lindl. (1835) (Basionym); Pleurothallis stenopetala Lodd. ex Lindl. (1838); Pleurothallis listrostachys Rchb.f. (1855); Anathallis secunda Barb.Rodr. (1881); Humboldtia sclerophylla (Lindl.) Kuntze (1891); Humboldtia stenopetala (Lodd. ex Lindl.) Kuntze (1891); Pleurothallis urosepala F. Lehm. & Kraenzl. (1899); Pleurothallis tricora Schltr. (1916); Pleurothallis triura Schltr. (1916); Pleurothallis lamprophylla Schltr. (1918); Pleurothallis poasensis Ames (1922); Pleurothallis peregrina Ames (1923); Pleurothallis ottonis Schltr. (1929); Zosterophyllanthos stenopetalus (Lodd. ex Lindl.) Szlach. & Marg. (2001); Specklinia sclerophylla (Lindl.) Luer (2004)

= Anathallis sclerophylla =

Species of orchid

Anathallis sclerophylla is a species of orchid.
