= Anathallis burzlaffiana =

Scientific classification
- Kingdom: Plantae
- Clade: Tracheophytes
- Clade: Angiosperms
- Clade: Monocots
- Order: Asparagales
- Family: Orchidaceae
- Subfamily: Epidendroideae
- Genus: Anathallis
- Species: A. burzlaffiana

Binomial name
- Anathallis burzlaffiana (Luer & Sijm) Luer

Synonyms
- Pleurothallis burzlaffiana Luer & Sijm; Pleurothallis succuba Luer

Species of plant

Anathallis burzlaffiana is a species of orchid plant.
