= Karmah =

Karmah may refer to:

- Karmah, Iraq, a city in Iraq near Fallujah
- Kerma, an archaeological site in Sudan
- Karmah (band), an Italian duo

== See also ==
- Karma (disambiguation)
