= Anathallis clandestina =

Scientific classification
- Kingdom: Plantae
- Clade: Tracheophytes
- Clade: Angiosperms
- Clade: Monocots
- Order: Asparagales
- Family: Orchidaceae
- Subfamily: Epidendroideae
- Genus: Anathallis
- Species: A. clandestina

Binomial name
- Anathallis clandestina (Lindl.) Pridgeon & M.W.Chase

Synonyms
- Pleurothallis clandestina Lindl.

Species of plant

Anathallis clandestina is a species of orchid plant native to Venezuela.
