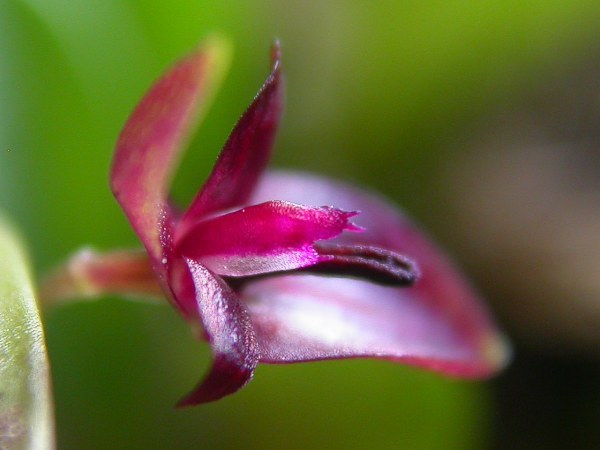

Scientific classification
- Kingdom: Plantae
- Clade: Tracheophytes
- Clade: Angiosperms
- Clade: Monocots
- Order: Asparagales
- Family: Orchidaceae
- Subfamily: Epidendroideae
- Genus: Anathallis
- Species: A. imberbis

Binomial name
- Anathallis imberbis (Luer & Hirtz) Luer

Synonyms
- Pleurothallis aondae Carnevali & G.A.Romero; Pleurothallis imberbis Luer & Hirtz

= Anathallis imberbis =

Species of orchid

Anathallis imberbis is a species of orchid plant native to Bolivia, Brazil, Ecuador, Venezuela.
