= Anathallis bleyensis =

Scientific classification
- Kingdom: Plantae
- Clade: Tracheophytes
- Clade: Angiosperms
- Clade: Monocots
- Order: Asparagales
- Family: Orchidaceae
- Subfamily: Epidendroideae
- Genus: Anathallis
- Species: A. bleyensis

Binomial name
- Anathallis bleyensis (Pabst) F.Barros

Synonyms
- Pleurothallis bleyensis Pabst

Species of orchid

Anathallis bleyensis is a species of orchid plant native to Brazil.
