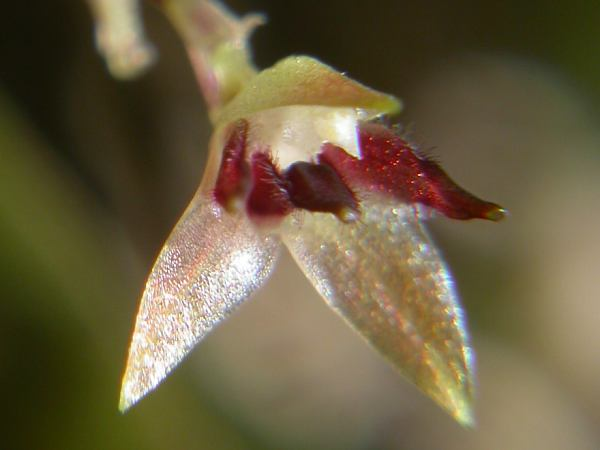

Scientific classification
- Kingdom: Plantae
- Clade: Tracheophytes
- Clade: Angiosperms
- Clade: Monocots
- Order: Asparagales
- Family: Orchidaceae
- Subfamily: Epidendroideae
- Genus: Anathallis
- Species: A. adenochila

Binomial name
- Anathallis adenochila (Loefgr.) F.Barros

Synonyms
- Pleurothallis adenochila Loefgr.

= Anathallis adenochila =

Species of plant

Anathallis adenochila is a species of orchid plant native to Brazil.
