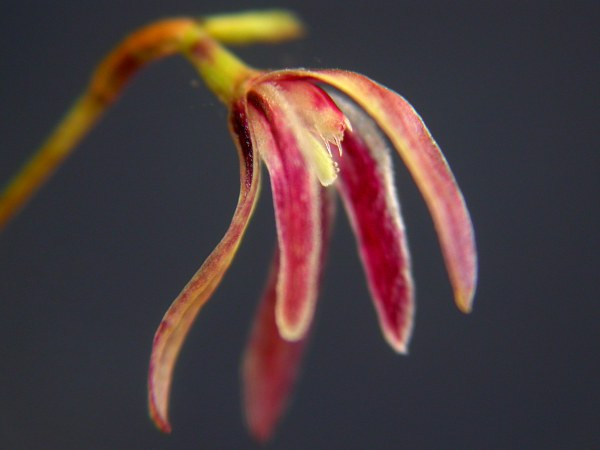

Scientific classification
- Kingdom: Plantae
- Clade: Tracheophytes
- Clade: Angiosperms
- Clade: Monocots
- Order: Asparagales
- Family: Orchidaceae
- Subfamily: Epidendroideae
- Genus: Anathallis
- Species: A. bocainensis

Binomial name
- Anathallis bocainensis (Porto & Brade) F.Barros & Barberena

Synonyms
- Pleurothallis bocainensis Porto & Brade

= Anathallis bocainensis =

Species of orchid

Anathallis bocainensis is a species of flowering plant in the orchid family, Orchidaceae. It is endemic to Southeast Brazil.
