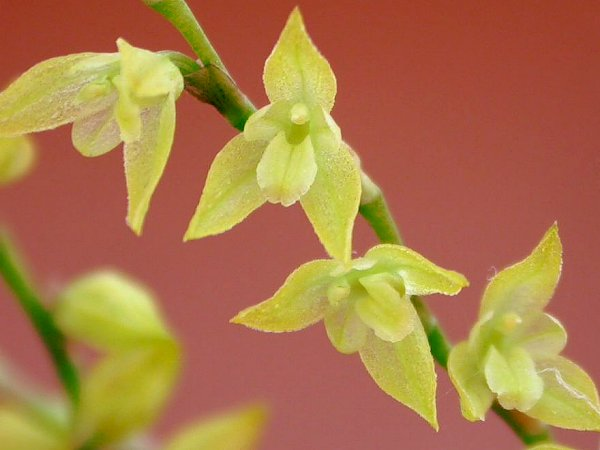

Scientific classification
- Kingdom: Plantae
- Clade: Tracheophytes
- Clade: Angiosperms
- Clade: Monocots
- Order: Asparagales
- Family: Orchidaceae
- Subfamily: Epidendroideae
- Genus: Anathallis
- Species: A. rubens

Binomial name
- Anathallis rubens (Lindl.) Pridgeon & M.W. Chase (2001)

Synonyms
- Pleurothallis rubens Lindl. (1835) (Basionym); Humboldtia rubens (Lindl.) Kuntze (1891); Specklinia rubens (Lindl.) F. Barros (1983); Pleurothallis rubens var. latifolia Cogn. (1896); Pleurothallis rubens var. longifolia Cogn. (1896); Pleurothallis montserratii Porsch (1905); Pleurothallis amblyopetala Schltr. (1913); Pleurothallis excisa C. Schweinf. (1953); Anathallis amblyopetala (Schltr.) Pridgeon & M.W. Chase (2001)

= Anathallis rubens =

Species of orchid

Anathallis rubens is a species of orchid.
