= Anathallis guarujaensis =

Scientific classification
- Kingdom: Plantae
- Clade: Tracheophytes
- Clade: Angiosperms
- Clade: Monocots
- Order: Asparagales
- Family: Orchidaceae
- Subfamily: Epidendroideae
- Genus: Anathallis
- Species: A. guarujaensis

Binomial name
- Anathallis guarujaensis (Hoehne) F.Barros

Synonyms
- Pleurothallis guarujaensis Hoehne

Species of plant

Anathallis guarujaensis is a species of orchid plant native to Brazil.
