= Anathallis angustilabia =

Scientific classification
- Kingdom: Plantae
- Clade: Tracheophytes
- Clade: Angiosperms
- Clade: Monocots
- Order: Asparagales
- Family: Orchidaceae
- Subfamily: Epidendroideae
- Genus: Anathallis
- Species: A. angustilabia

Binomial name
- Anathallis angustilabia Pridgeon & M.W.Chase

Species of plant

Anathallis angustilabia is a species of plant in the Orchidaceae family.

== Distribution ==
It is endemic to Colombia.

== Description ==
Anathallis angustilabia is found in forests at elevations of 800 to 2500 meters. It is an epiphyte that blooms in late winter to early spring.

== Taxonomy ==
It was named by Alec Melton Pridgeon, and Mark Wayne Chase in Lindleyana 16: 247 in 2001.
