= DeSoL =

American band

deSoL
- Origin: Asbury Park, New Jersey, U.S.
- Genres: Rock/Latin
- Years active: 2001–2024
- Labels: saZonRecords/Two22Music
- Website: http://www.desol-music.com/

deSol is an American band, based in Asbury Park, New Jersey. Described as "Rock & Roll with a Latin soul", the band's second full-length album, On My Way, was released on August 7, 2007.

== Formation and touring ==
In January 2001 deSoL was officially formed. Located in Asbury Park, the band started touring extensively on the east coast, which earned them a record deal with Curb Records. deSoL quickly became a mainstay in large tours as a supporting act, including an opening slot for R.E.M. at the Palacio de los Deportes in Mexico City. deSoL supported many acts including Blues Traveler, Los Lonely Boys, Ozomatli, Cypress Hill, Arrested Development and Widespread Panic. In 2005, deSoL toured extensively with the Legendary Wailers, playing to sold-out venues six nights a week for four months. This allowed the band to perfect its stage show and to gain national and international exposure. The band performed at all of the major festivals including Bonnaroo, Lollapalooza, Austin City Limits, All Good, South by Southwest, Langerado and Nashville River Stages.

During the latter half of 2006, the group embarked on an Armed Forces Entertainment tour. The group visited military bases in Kuwait, Qatar, Bahrain and Djibouti, performing for American service personnel.

deSoL released four albums during their career. The group received radio air play for their songs "Karma", "Blanco y Negro", "Sing it All Night" and "On My Way". In addition, deSoL got into the top 3 in the charts with their version of the Christmas song "Little Drummer Boy". The song continues to receive air play each December.

After years of personal change, the core group decided to step back for a few years to enjoy life and explore other interests.

== Members ==
- Albie Monterrosa (2001–2024) - acoustic guitar/electric guitar/vocals
- Andy Letke (2001–2024) - piano/organ/accordion/vocals
- James Guerrero (2001–2024) - congas/bongo drums/percussion/vocals
- Chris Guice (C6) (2001–2024) - bass guitar/vocals
- Ron Shields (2001–2007) - drums
- Chris Stone (2007–2020) - drums
- Soto (2001/2016-2020) - Electric Guitar/vocals

== Past members ==
- Armando Cabrera (2001–2005) - timbales/percussion
- George Saccal (2004–2005) - Drums
- Jeremy Hoenig (2005–2006) - Drums
- Ray Turull (2005–2006) - Percussion
- Ron Shields (2001-2003/ 2007) - Drums/timbales
- Kevin Ansell (2006–2008) - Electric Guitar, vocals
- Cliff Dill (2008) - Electric Guitar
- Jimmy Farkas (2008–2013) - Lead Guitar

== Discography ==
=== Albums ===
- Spanish Radio (2002, saZon Records)
- deSoL (2005, Curb Records)
- LiVe/ViVo EP (2006, saZon Records)
- On My Way (saZon Records 2007)

=== Singles ===
- "Karma" - 2005
- "Little Drummer Boy" - #6 Billboard - 2005
- "Blanco y Negro" - 2005
- "Sing it All Night" - 2007
- "On My Way" - 2008

== See also ==
- Music of New Jersey
