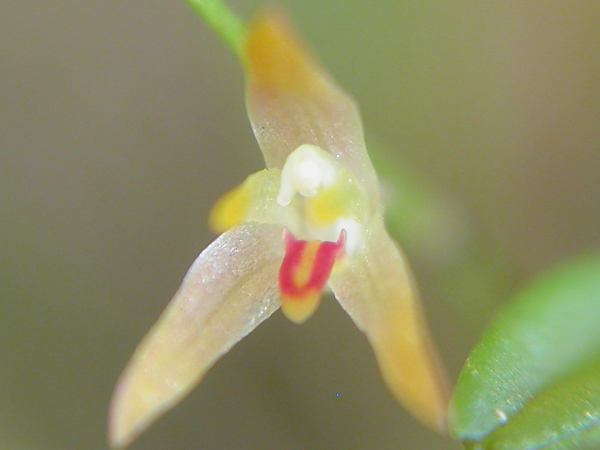

Scientific classification
- Kingdom: Plantae
- Clade: Tracheophytes
- Clade: Angiosperms
- Clade: Monocots
- Order: Asparagales
- Family: Orchidaceae
- Subfamily: Epidendroideae
- Genus: Anathallis
- Species: A. reedii

Binomial name
- Anathallis reedii (Luer) F. Barros (2006)

Synonyms
- Pleurothallis reedii Luer (Basionym); Specklinia reedii (Luer) Luer (2004); Panmorphia reedii (Luer) Luer (2006)

= Anathallis reedii =

Species of orchid

Anathallis reedii is a species of orchid.
