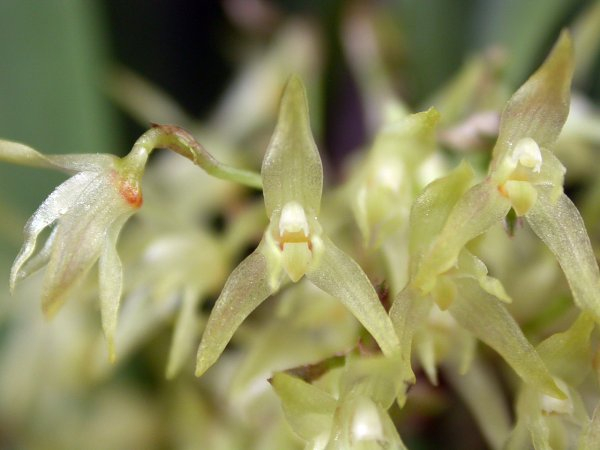
- Anathallis obovata

Scientific classification
- Kingdom: Plantae
- Clade: Tracheophytes
- Clade: Angiosperms
- Clade: Monocots
- Order: Asparagales
- Family: Orchidaceae
- Subfamily: Epidendroideae
- Tribe: Epidendreae
- Subtribe: Pleurothallidinae
- Genus: Anathallis; Barb. Rodr.

Type species
- Anathallis fasciculata Barb. Rodr.

Species
- See text

Synonyms
- Palmoglossum Klotzsch ex Rchb.f.; Panmorphia Luer

= Anathallis =

Genus of orchids

Anathallis is a genus of orchids, with 103 accepted species as of May 2025 native to Mexico, Central America, South America and the West Indies.

== Selected species ==
The genus includes the following species:

- Anathallis abbreviata
- Anathallis acuminata (Kunth) Pridgeon & M.W.Chase, Lindleyana 16: 247 (2001).
- Anathallis adenochila
- Anathallis adrianae
- Anathallis anderssonii (Luer) Pridgeon & M.W.Chase, Lindleyana 16: 247 (2001).
- Anathallis anfracta
- Anathallis angulosa
- Anathallis angustilabia (Schltr.) Pridgeon & M.W.Chase, Lindleyana 16: 247 (2001).
- Anathallis ariasii (Luer & Hirtz) Pridgeon & M.W.Chase, Lindleyana 16: 247 (2001).
- Anathallis aristulata (Lindl.) Luer, Monogr. Syst. Bot. Missouri Bot. Gard. 112: 118 (2007).
- Anathallis articulata
- Anathallis attenuata (Rolfe) Pridgeon & M.W.Chase, Lindleyana 16: 247 (2001).
- Anathallis barbulata
- Anathallis bertoniensis
- Anathallis bleyensis (Pabst) F.Barros, Hoehnea 30: 187 (2003).
- Anathallis bocainensis
- Anathallis brevipes
- Anathallis burzlaffiana
- Anathallis carnosifolia (C.Schweinf.) Pridgeon & M.W.Chase, Lindleyana 16: 248 (2001).
- Anathallis caudatipetala
- Anathallis carvalhoi (Luer & Toscano) Luer, Monogr. Syst. Bot. Missouri Bot. Gard. 112: 118 (2007).
- Anathallis clandestina
- Anathallis concinna (Luer & R.Vásquez) Pridgeon & M.W.Chase, Lindleyana 16: 248 (2001).
- Anathallis coripatae (Luer & R.Vásquez) Pridgeon & M.W.Chase, Lindleyana 16: 248 (2001).
- Anathallis crebrifolia (Barb.Rodr.) Luer, Monogr. Syst. Bot. Missouri Bot. Gard. 112: 118 (2007).
- Anathallis cuspidata
- Anathallis deborana
- Anathallis dimidia (Luer) Pridgeon & M.W.Chase, Lindleyana 16: 248 (2001).
- Anathallis dolichopus (Schltr.) Pridgeon & M.W.Chase, Lindleyana 16: 248 (2001).
- Anathallis dryadum (Schltr.) F.Barros, Orchid Memories: 10 (2004).
- Anathallis fastigiata
- Anathallis ferdinandiana (Barb.Rodr.) F.Barros, Hoehnea 30: 187 (2003).
- Anathallis fernandiana (Hoehne) F.Barros, Hoehnea 30: 187 (2003).
- Anathallis flammea (Barb.Rodr.) F.Barros, Hoehnea 30: 187 (2003).
- Anathallis funerea
- Anathallis gert-hatschbachii (Hoehne) Pridgeon & M.W.Chase, Lindleyana 16: 248 (2001).
- Anathallis gracilenta (Luer & R.Vásquez) Pridgeon & M.W.Chase, Lindleyana 16: 248 (2001).
- Anathallis graveolens (Pabst) F.Barros, Bradea 11: 30 (2006).
- Anathallis guarujaensis (Hoehne) F.Barros, Hoehnea 30: 187 (2003).
- Anathallis guimaraensii (Brade) Luer & Toscano
- Anathallis haberi
- Anathallis heterophylla Barb.Rodr., Gen. Spec. Orchid. 2: 74 (1881).
- Anathallis imberbis
- Anathallis imbricata (Barb.Rodr.) F.Barros & F.Pinheiro, Bradea 8: 329 (2002).
- Anathallis jamaicensis
- Anathallis jesupiorum (Luer & Hirtz) Pridgeon & M.W.Chase, Lindleyana 16: 249 (2001).
- Anathallis jordanensis (Hoehne) F.Barros, Hoehnea 30: 189 (2003).
- Anathallis lagarophyta (Luer) Pridgeon & M.W.Chase, Lindleyana 16: 249 (2001).
- Anathallis lichenophila (Porto & Brade) Luer, Monogr. Syst. Bot. Missouri Bot. Gard. 112: 118 (2007).
- Anathallis linearifolia (Cogn.) Pridgeon & M.W.Chase, Lindleyana 16: 249 (2001).
- Anathallis maguirei (Luer) Pridgeon & M.W.Chase, Lindleyana 16: 249 (2001).
- Anathallis malmeana (Dutra ex Pabst) Pridgeon & M.W.Chase, Lindleyana 16: 249 (2001).
- Anathallis mediocarinata (C.Schweinf.) Pridgeon & M.W.Chase, Lindleyana 16: 249 (2001).
- Anathallis meridana (Rchb.f.) Pridgeon & M.W.Chase, Lindleyana 16: 249 (2001).
- Anathallis microgemma (Schltr. ex Hoehne) Pridgeon & M.W.Chase, Lindleyana 16: 249 (2001).
- Anathallis microphyta (Barb.Rodr.) C.O.Azevedo & Van den Berg, Kew Bull. 60: 137 (2005).
- Anathallis miguelii (Schltr.) Pridgeon & M.W.Chase, Lindleyana 16: 249 (2001).
- Anathallis modesta (Barb.Rodr.) Pridgeon & M.W.Chase, Lindleyana 16: 249 (2001).
- Anathallis montipelladensis (Hoehne) F.Barros, Bradea 8: 295 (2002).
- Anathallis nectarifera Barb.Rodr., Gen. Spec. Orchid. 2: 74 (1881).
- Anathallis obovata (Lindl.) Pridgeon & M.W.Chase, Lindleyana 16: 250 (2001).
- Anathallis ourobranquensis Campacci & Menini, Bol. CAOB 60: 123 (2005 publ. 2006).
- Anathallis pabstii (Garay) Pridgeon & M.W.Chase, Lindleyana 16: 250 (2001).
- Anathallis papuligera (Schltr.) Pridgeon & M.W.Chase, Lindleyana 16: 250 (2001).
- Anathallis petersiana (Schltr.) Pridgeon & M.W.Chase, Lindleyana 16: 250 (2001).
- Anathallis piratiningana (Hoehne) F.Barros, Hoehnea 30: 190 (2003).
- Anathallis platystylis (Schltr.) Pridgeon & M.W.Chase, Lindleyana 16: 250 (2001).
- Anathallis polygonoides
- Anathallis pubipetala (Hoehne) Pridgeon & M.W.Chase, Lindleyana 16: 250 (2001).
- Anathallis pusilla (Barb.Rodr.) F.Barros, Hoehnea 30: 190 (2003).
- Anathallis puttemansii (Hoehne) F.Barros, Hoehnea 30: 190 (2003).
- Anathallis radialis (Porto & Brade) Pridgeon & M.W.Chase, Lindleyana 16: 250 (2001).
- Anathallis ramulosa (Lindl.) Pridgeon & M.W.Chase, Lindleyana 16: 250 (2001).
- Anathallis reedii (Luer) Luer, Monogr. Syst. Bot. Missouri Bot. Gard. 112: 118 (2007).
- Anathallis regalis (Luer) Pridgeon & M.W.Chase, Lindleyana 16: 250 (2001).
- Anathallis rubens (Lindl.) Pridgeon & M.W.Chase, Lindleyana 16: 250 (2001).
- Anathallis sanchezii
- Anathallis scariosa (Lex.) Pridgeon & M.W.Chase, Lindleyana 16: 250 (2001).
- Anathallis schlimii (Luer) Pridgeon & M.W.Chase, Lindleyana 16: 250 (2001).
- Anathallis sclerophylla (Lindl.) Pridgeon & M.W.Chase, Lindleyana 16: 250 (2001).
- Anathallis simpliciglossa (Loefgr.) Pridgeon & M.W.Chase, Lindleyana 16: 250 (2001).
- Anathallis smaragdina (Luer) Pridgeon & M.W.Chase, Lindleyana 16: 250 (2001).
- Anathallis soratana (Rchb.f.) Pridgeon & M.W.Chase, Lindleyana 16: 250 (2001).
- Anathallis sororcula (Schltr.) Luer, Monogr. Syst. Bot. Missouri Bot. Gard. 112: 118 (2007).
- Anathallis spannageliana (Hoehne) Pridgeon & M.W.Chase, Lindleyana 16: 250 (2001).
- Anathallis spathilabia (Schltr.) Pridgeon & M.W.Chase, Lindleyana 16: 251 (2001).
- Anathallis spathuliformis (Luer & R.Vásquez) Pridgeon & M.W.Chase, Lindleyana 16: 251 (2001).
- Anathallis stenophylla (F.Lehm. & Kraenzl.) Pridgeon & M.W.Chase, Lindleyana 16: 251 (2001).
- Anathallis subnulla (Luer & Toscano) F.Barros, Bradea 11: 31 (2006).
- Anathallis trullilabia (Pabst) F.Barros, Bradea 11: 31 (2006).
- Anathallis unduavica (Luer & R.Vásquez) Pridgeon & M.W.Chase, Lindleyana 16: 251 (2001).
- Anathallis vasquezii (Luer) Pridgeon & M.W.Chase, Lindleyana 16: 251 (2001).
- Anathallis vestita (Kraenzl.) Pridgeon & M.W.Chase, Lindleyana 16: 251 (2001).
- Anathallis vitorinoi
- Anathallis welteri
- Anathallis ypirangae (Kraenzl.) Pridgeon & M.W.Chase, Lindleyana 16: 251 (2001).
