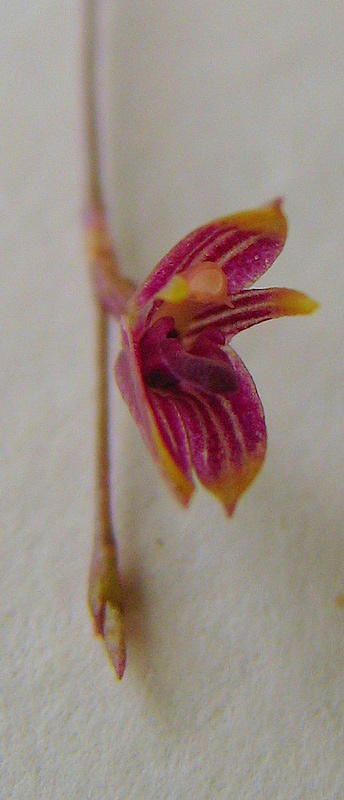

Scientific classification
- Kingdom: Plantae
- Clade: Tracheophytes
- Clade: Angiosperms
- Clade: Monocots
- Order: Asparagales
- Family: Orchidaceae
- Subfamily: Epidendroideae
- Genus: Anathallis
- Species: A. articulata

Binomial name
- Anathallis articulata (Lindl.) Luer & Toscano

Synonyms
- Pleurothallis articulata Lindl.

= Anathallis articulata =

Species of orchid

Anathallis articulata is a species of orchid plant.
