= Anathallis jesupiorum =

Scientific classification
- Kingdom: Plantae
- Clade: Tracheophytes
- Clade: Angiosperms
- Clade: Monocots
- Order: Asparagales
- Family: Orchidaceae
- Subfamily: Epidendroideae
- Genus: Anathallis
- Species: A. jesupiorum

Binomial name
- Anathallis jesupiorum (Luer & Hirtz) Pridgeon & M.W.Chase

Synonyms
- Pleurothallis jesupiorum Luer & Hirtz

Species of plant

Anathallis jesupiorum is a species of orchid plant native to Ecuador.
