= Anathallis deborana =

Scientific classification
- Kingdom: Plantae
- Clade: Tracheophytes
- Clade: Angiosperms
- Clade: Monocots
- Order: Asparagales
- Family: Orchidaceae
- Subfamily: Epidendroideae
- Genus: Anathallis
- Species: A. deborana

Binomial name
- Anathallis deborana (Carnevali & I.Ramírez) Carnevali & I.Ramírez

Synonyms
- Pleurothallis deborana Carnevali & I.Ramírez

Species of orchid

Anathallis deborana is a species of orchid plant native to Venezuela.
