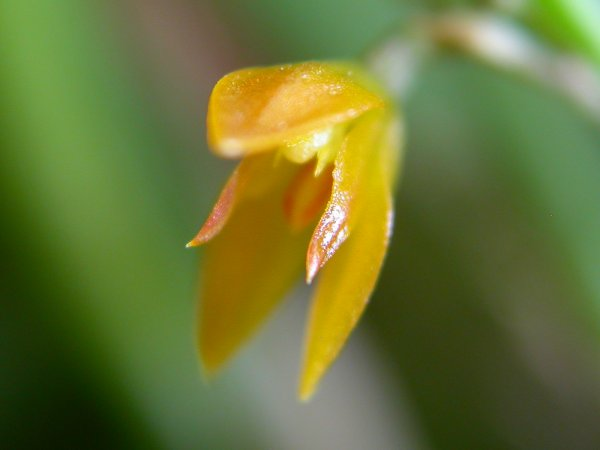

Scientific classification
- Kingdom: Plantae
- Clade: Tracheophytes
- Clade: Angiosperms
- Clade: Monocots
- Order: Asparagales
- Family: Orchidaceae
- Subfamily: Epidendroideae
- Genus: Anathallis
- Species: A. brevipes

Binomial name
- Anathallis brevipes (H.Focke) Pridgeon & M.W.Chase

Synonyms
- Pleurothallis brevipes H.Focke

= Anathallis brevipes =

Species of plant

Anathallis brevipes is a species of orchid plant native to Guyana.
