= Anathallis ariasii =

Scientific classification
- Kingdom: Plantae
- Clade: Tracheophytes
- Clade: Angiosperms
- Clade: Monocots
- Order: Asparagales
- Family: Orchidaceae
- Subfamily: Epidendroideae
- Genus: Anathallis
- Species: A. ariasii

Binomial name
- Anathallis ariasii (Luer & Hirtz) Pridgeon & M.W.Chase

Synonyms
- Pleurothallis ariasii Luer & Hirtz; Specklinia ariasii (Luer & Hirtz) Luer; Stelis ariasii (Luer & Hirtz) Karremans

Species of orchid

Anathallis ariasii is a species of orchid endemic to Peru.
