= Anathallis angulosa =

Scientific classification
- Kingdom: Plantae
- Clade: Tracheophytes
- Clade: Angiosperms
- Clade: Monocots
- Order: Asparagales
- Family: Orchidaceae
- Subfamily: Epidendroideae
- Genus: Anathallis
- Species: A. angulosa

Binomial name
- Anathallis angulosa (Luer & Hirtz) Luer

Synonyms
- Pleurothallis angulosa Luer & Hirtz

Species of plant

Anathallis angulosa is a species of orchid plant native to Ecuador.
