= Anathallis bertoniensis =

Scientific classification
- Kingdom: Plantae
- Clade: Tracheophytes
- Clade: Angiosperms
- Clade: Monocots
- Order: Asparagales
- Family: Orchidaceae
- Subfamily: Epidendroideae
- Genus: Anathallis
- Species: A. bertoniensis

Binomial name
- Anathallis bertoniensis (Hauman) Luer

Synonyms
- Pleurothallis bertoniensis Hauman

Species of orchid

Anathallis bertoniensis is a species of orchid plant native to Argentina.
