= Nunni =

2015 novel by Karanam Pavan Prasad

Nanni
- First edition
- Author: Karanam Pavan Prasad
- Original title: ನನ್ನಿ
- Language: Kannada
- Subject: Theology, Realism, Contemporary
- Genre: faction
- Published: 2015 Concave Media co., Bangalore
- Publication place: India
- Media type: Print (Paper Back)
- Pages: 182
- Preceded by: Karma

Nunni is a 2015 novel written by Karanam Pavan Prasad. Dealing with the truth seeking temperament of human creature. Novel revolves around female protagonist - who is basically a Nun. Story reveals the missionaries activities in prospect to the world by dragging our vision to the fundamental definitions about truth, service and harmony. 'Nunni' was released on 25 September 2015. It made a critical analysis of Christian missionaries Having Indian Nun as a protagonist. 'Mother Elisa' The character which resembles Mother Teresa, Eminently portrayed in this novel and also it propagated significant debates about truth, harmony and service Mother Teresa. The novel went out well with selling perspective as well as critical perspective. it is conceived as a classic work in recent times in Kannada literature as well as Indian literature.

== Characters ==
- Sister Rona
- Rayappa
- Mother elisa
- Milton Fàbregas
- Katherina
