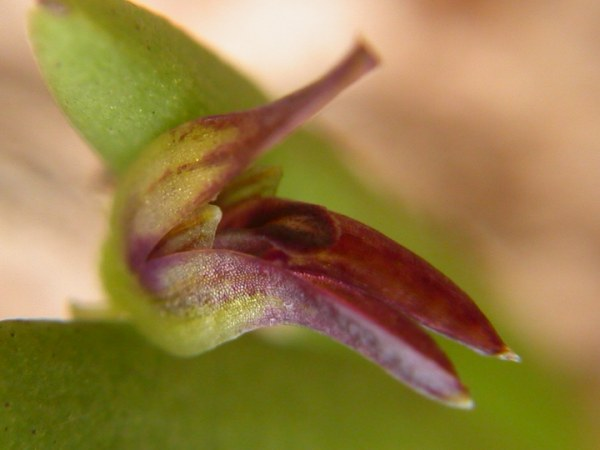

Conservation status
- Vulnerable (IUCN 3.1)

Scientific classification
- Kingdom: Plantae
- Clade: Tracheophytes
- Clade: Angiosperms
- Clade: Monocots
- Order: Asparagales
- Family: Orchidaceae
- Subfamily: Epidendroideae
- Genus: Anathallis
- Species: A. guimaraensii

Binomial name
- Anathallis guimaraensii (Brade) Luer & Toscano

Synonyms
- Homotypic Synonyms: Acianthera guimaraensii (Brade) F.Barros; Pleurothallis guimaraensii Brade; Specklinia guimaraensii (Brade) Luer

= Anathallis guimaraensii =

Species of orchid

Anathallis guimaraensii is a species of flowering plant in the orchid family, Orchidaceae. It is endemic to South Brazil.
