= Anathallis stenophylla =

Scientific classification
- Kingdom: Plantae
- Clade: Tracheophytes
- Clade: Angiosperms
- Clade: Monocots
- Order: Asparagales
- Family: Orchidaceae
- Subfamily: Epidendroideae
- Genus: Anathallis
- Species: A. stenophylla

Binomial name
- Anathallis stenophylla (F.Lehm. & Kraenzl.) Pridgeon & M.W.Chase

Synonyms
- Pleurothallis stenophylla F.Lehm. & Kraenzl.

Species of plant

Anathallis stenophylla is a species of orchid plant native to Colombia.
