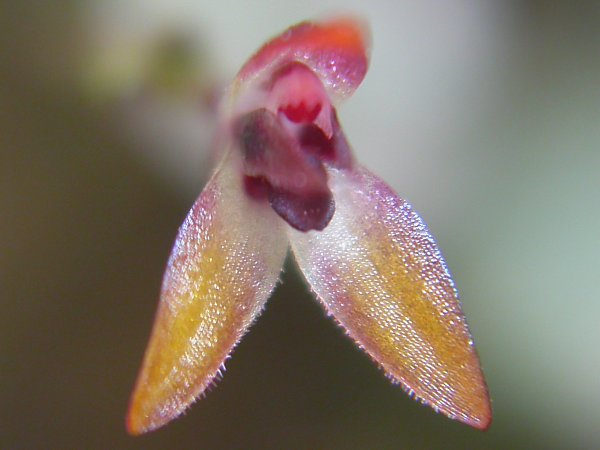

Scientific classification
- Kingdom: Plantae
- Clade: Tracheophytes
- Clade: Angiosperms
- Clade: Monocots
- Order: Asparagales
- Family: Orchidaceae
- Subfamily: Epidendroideae
- Genus: Anathallis
- Species: A. vitorinoi

Binomial name
- Anathallis vitorinoi (Luer & Toscano) Luer & Toscano

Synonyms
- Pleurothallis vitorinoi Luer & Toscano

= Anathallis vitorinoi =

Species of plant

Anathallis vitorinoi is a species of orchid plant native to Brazil.
