= Anathallis cuspidata =

Scientific classification
- Kingdom: Plantae
- Clade: Tracheophytes
- Clade: Angiosperms
- Clade: Monocots
- Order: Asparagales
- Family: Orchidaceae
- Subfamily: Epidendroideae
- Genus: Anathallis
- Species: A. cuspidata

Binomial name
- Anathallis cuspidata (Luer) Pridgeon & M.W.Chase

Synonyms
- Pleurothallis cuspidata Luer

Species of plant

Anathallis cuspidata is a species of orchid plant native to Panama.
