= Anathallis attenuata =

Scientific classification
- Kingdom: Plantae
- Clade: Tracheophytes
- Clade: Angiosperms
- Clade: Monocots
- Order: Asparagales
- Family: Orchidaceae
- Subfamily: Epidendroideae
- Genus: Anathallis
- Species: A. attenuata

Binomial name
- Anathallis attenuata (Rolfe) Pridgeon & M.W.Chase

Synonyms
- Pleurothallis attenuata Rolfe

Species of orchid

Anathallis attenuata is a species of orchid native to the Americas.
