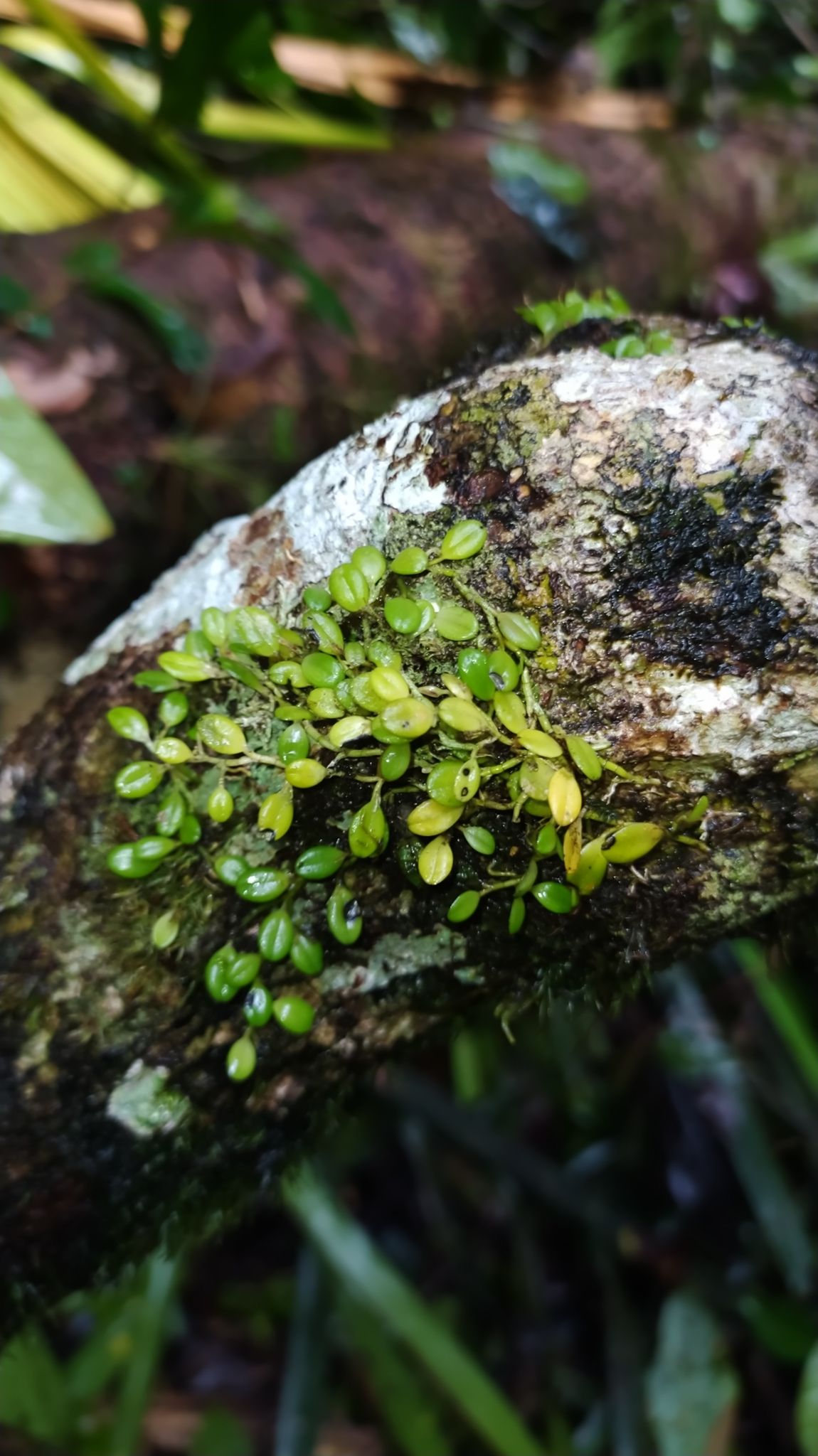

Scientific classification
- Kingdom: Plantae
- Clade: Tracheophytes
- Clade: Angiosperms
- Clade: Monocots
- Order: Asparagales
- Family: Orchidaceae
- Subfamily: Epidendroideae
- Genus: Anathallis
- Species: A. polygonoides

Binomial name
- Anathallis polygonoides (Griseb.) Pridgeon & M.W.Chase

Synonyms
- Humboltia polygonoides (Griseb.) Kuntze; Panmorphia polygonoides (Griseb.) Luer; Pleurothallis polygonoides Griseb.; Specklinia polygonoides (Griseb.) Luer

= Anathallis polygonoides =

Species of plant

Anathallis polygonoides is a species of flowering plant in the family Orchidaceae. It is native to Trinidad and Tobago.
