= Anathallis jamaicensis =

Scientific classification
- Kingdom: Plantae
- Clade: Tracheophytes
- Clade: Angiosperms
- Clade: Monocots
- Order: Asparagales
- Family: Orchidaceae
- Subfamily: Epidendroideae
- Genus: Anathallis
- Species: A. jamaicensis

Binomial name
- Anathallis jamaicensis (Rolfe) Luer

Synonyms
- Pleurothallis jamaicensis Rolfe

Species of plant

Anathallis jamaicensis is a species of orchid plant native to Jamaica.
