= Anathallis barbulata =

Scientific classification
- Kingdom: Plantae
- Clade: Tracheophytes
- Clade: Angiosperms
- Clade: Monocots
- Order: Asparagales
- Family: Orchidaceae
- Subfamily: Epidendroideae
- Genus: Anathallis
- Species: A. barbulata

Binomial name
- Anathallis barbulata (Lindl.) Pridgeon & M.W.Chase

Synonyms
- Pleurothallis barbulata Lindl.

Species of orchid

Anathallis barbulata is a species of orchid plant native to Guyana.
