= Anathallis haberi =

Scientific classification
- Kingdom: Plantae
- Clade: Tracheophytes
- Clade: Angiosperms
- Clade: Monocots
- Order: Asparagales
- Family: Orchidaceae
- Subfamily: Epidendroideae
- Genus: Anathallis
- Species: A. haberi

Binomial name
- Anathallis haberi (Luer) Solano & Soto Arenas

Synonyms
- Pleurothallis haberi Luer

Species of plant

Anathallis haberi is a species of orchid plant native to Costa Rica.
