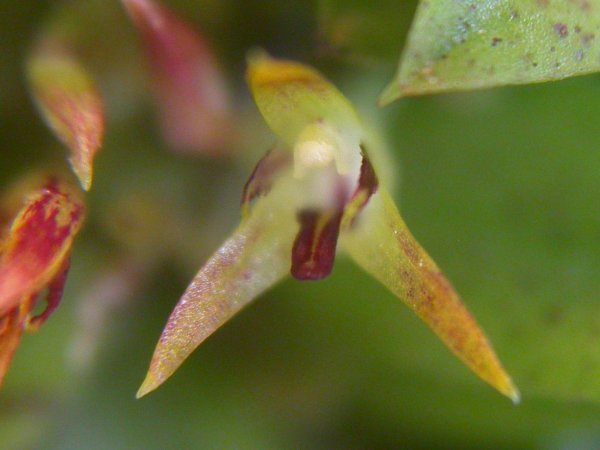

Scientific classification
- Kingdom: Plantae
- Clade: Tracheophytes
- Clade: Angiosperms
- Clade: Monocots
- Order: Asparagales
- Family: Orchidaceae
- Subfamily: Epidendroideae
- Genus: Anathallis
- Species: A. imbricata

Binomial name
- Anathallis imbricata (Barb.Rodr.) F. Barros & F. Pinheiro (2002)

Synonyms
- Pleurothallis imbricata Barb.Rodr. (1877) (basionym); Lepanthes imbricata (Barb.Rodr.) Barb.Rodr. (1881); Specklinia imbricata (Barb.Rodr.) Luer (2004)

= Anathallis imbricata =

Species of orchid

Anathallis imbricata is a species of orchid.
