= Karma (telecom company) =

Prepaid mobile provider

Karma Mobility, Inc.
- Website type: Private
- Founded: January 18, 2012; 14 years ago
- Headquarters: Irving, TX
- Creators: Robert Gaal, Stefan Borsje, Steven van Wel
- Products: Karma Go
- Services: Wireless internet
- Website: karmamobility.com
- Native clients on: iOS, Android

Karma Mobility, Inc. is a prepaid mobile provider that operates on Sprint's 4G LTE Network. The company provides hardware and data. The company is headquartered in Irving, Texas. The company was founded in 2012 through Techstars.

== Controversy ==
Karma became a center of controversy in January 2016, over changing their Neverstop plan and cutting customer's data multiple times. Some customers accused the company of using bait and switch tactics. Newer customers were offered a refund for their devices, based on Karma's standard 45–day return policy. However, customers who purchased Karma "Go" hotspots with Neverstop, outside of that standard return period, were explicitly told "no refunds".

Karma offered a program called "Neverstop" where users got unlimited data at up to 5 Mbit/s for US$50 a month. After two months, Karma blamed customers for "misuse" of the unlimited data service and began throttling users speeds from 5 Mbit/s to 1 Mbit/s. After over a week of throttled speeds, Karma decided to change the "Neverstop" program from unlimited to 15 GB for the same US$50 price. Karma's website stated that they would give users 30 days notice if any changes occur. However, their users were given no warning for the sudden change from unlimited 5 Mbit/s to throttled 1.5 Mbit/s and then to a data cap of 15 GB. After just one month, the "Neverstop" service changed again and this time Karma decided to use a new program called "Pulse". Neverstop ended and Pulse became the new service for Karma users.

== Network ==
Karma's first generation ran on Sprint's WiMax network which shut down in November 2015. Their second generation, Karma Go, runs on Sprint's 4G LTE network. Karma encountered some issues adapting to Sprint's LTE network. However, after a long waiting period, they were able to fully convert over to the Sprint network. As of 2016, Karma has had to change a lot of their services due to high data usage from customers. Karma buys mass bulk data from Sprint and thus, currently cannot support unlimited plans. Karma has updated its services to stay on the Sprint network, and Karma and Sprint still maintain a relationship as of 2016.
