= Karma Phuntsok =

Australian painter (born 1952-)

- ཀརྨ་ཕུན་ཚོགས་
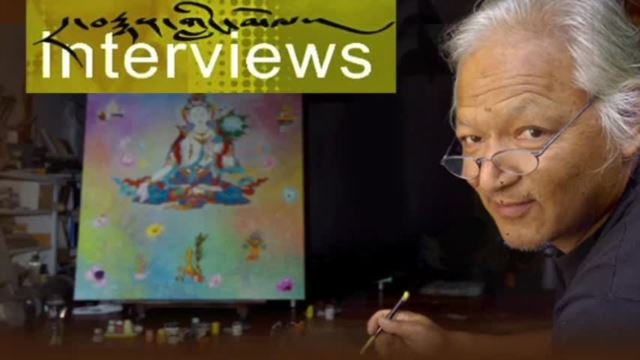
- Born: 1952 (age 73–74); Lhasa, Tibet

Karma Phuntsok (Tibetan: ཀརྨ་ཕུན་ཚོགས་, Wylie: karma phun tshogs; born 1952 in Lhasa, Tibet) is a Tibetan painter.

He fled Tibet with his family after the uprising against the Chinese in 1959, escaping into India as refugees. He studied drawing and painting through his school years in India. In 1973 Karma studied thanka painting with a master of traditional Tibetan thanka painting in Nepal. Since then he has been making paintings based on Tibetan Buddhist deities.

In 1981 Karma migrated to Australia, and now lives in the bush north of Kyogle with his wife and son.

Karma's paintings are collected worldwide, and published in various books and magazines. His recent paintings are mostly experiments, interweaving traditional techniques and symbols, with modern inspirations.

== Historical background and studies ==
In 1959, he became a refugee after the Chinese invasion of Tibet. Between 1960 and 1970, he attended school in Northern India. In 1973, he had an apprenticeship with a master of traditional Tibetan Thanka painting in Nepal. In1974, he became a full-time professional Thanka painter. In 1980, he migrated to Australia.

== Exhibitions ==
=== Individual exhibitions ===
- 2011 Transmitting Divinity Dharma Yoga Studio, Coconut Grove, Miami Florida USA (26/11-11/12).
- 2009 Magie du Tibet Galerie Metanoia, Paris, France (3/4-27/5)
- 2008 Light of Compassion Dharma Studio, Coconut Grove, Miami F. USA (24/5-17/6)
- 2007 Karma Phuntsok Art Exhibition The Gallery in Camberwell, Melbourne Australia (8/6-15/7)
- 2007 Lhasa to Kyogle Roxy Gallery, Kyogle Arts Council, Kyogle NSW Australia (16/1-10/2)
- 2006 Art Exhibition in "The Mystic Heart of Tibet" Cultural Festival Katoomba Civic Centre, Katoomba, Australia (3-8/10)
- 2006 Karma Phuntsok Art Exhibition Project Contemporary ArtSpace, Wollongong, Australia (15-26/2)
- 2004 Inner Space II Reyburn House, Whangarei, New Zealand (3-23 Feb)
- 2004 Inner Space Depot Artspace, Devonport, Auckland, New Zealand (17-30/1)
- 2003 Transmigration: Paintings of a Tibetan Artist Dharma Studio, Coconut Grove, Miami Fl.USA (29/3-26/4)
- 2002 Buddha Awakening Art Exhibition Namgyal Institute of Tibetology, Deorali Gantok Sikkim India (21-24/12)
- 2002 Paintings of Karma Phuntsok Tibetan Festival of Compassion, India Habitat Centre New Delhi, India (12-18/12)
- 2002 Transcendental Tibet Australian Catholic University Gallery, Fitzroy, Melbourne Australia (16/5-2/6)
- 2001 Karma Phuntsok Retrospective Roxy Gallery, Kyogle Arts Council, Kyogle NSW Australia (14/9-10/10)
- 2001 Tibet in Australia - Art for Awakening the Heart at Lismore Regional Art Gallery, Lismore NSW Australia (31/1-4/3)
- 2000 Mini Exhibition of Tibetan Art Bodhicitta Buddhist Centre, Cairns Qld Australia (1-15/7)
- 2000 Transcendent Realms Midori Gallery, Coconut Grove, Miami Fl. USA (18/3-14/4)
- 1999 Karma Phuntsok Exhibition Perc Tucker Regional Gallery, Townsville Qld. Australia (16/7-1/8).
- 1999 Awakening the Heart Exhibition at Port Douglas CWA Hall, (11/8-15/8)and at The Tanks, Cairns, Qld Australia (21-29/8)
- 1999 Continuum:the paintings of Karma Phuntsok, by AMI at Namgyal Monastery Dharamsala, India (March).
- 1996 Sacred Paintings -Michael Commerford Gallery - Rushcutters Bay, NSW Australia

=== Group exhibitions ===
- 2013 National Multicultural Festival Canberra Australia (8-10/2).
- 2013 Festival of Tibet Brisbane Powerhouse, Brisbane Australia (30/1-3/2).
- 2012 Dario Palermo Refugee Art Exhibition Uniting Church Sydney (1-5/2); Holroyd City Council Exhibition Space Sydney (1-31/8).
- 2012 Festival of Tibet Brisbane Powerhouse, Brisbane Australia (1-5/2).
- 2011 Nine Pillars. Contemporary Art Studio, Amsterdam Netherlands (opens 17/12)
- 2011 Jigyasa. International Centre Goa, Dona Paula, Goa India (5-10/11)
- 2011 Tibetan Contemporary Art: Tantric Vision in Modern Self-Expression. Tibet House US, New York NY USA (14/09-15/11)
- 2011 Festival of Tibet Brisbane Powerhouse, Brisbane Australia (3-5/2).
- 2010-11 Time Is With Us Roxy Gallery, Kyogle Arts Council, Kyogle NSW Australia (14/12-29/01)
- 2010 Festival of Tibet Brisbane Powerhouse, Brisbane (27-31/1); Sydney (19-21/2); Town Hall, Beaudesert Australia (12-14/5) .
- 2009 Tibet Art Now Tibet Art Gallery in the Temple, Amsterdam, Netherlands, (3/6-5/7)
- 2009 Tibet Art Now Okura Hotel, Amsterdam, Netherlands, (3/6-6/6)
- 2007 Classic Art and Sculpture Artspace, Bangalow NSW Australia (16-27/8).
- 2007 The Luminescent Ground Wollongong City Gallery, NSW Australia (22/6-5/8).
- 2007 Buddha 2550 Years The Exhibition Melbourne Town Hall, Melbourne, Australia (26/2-4/3).
- 2006 Mystical Art Brisbane Powerhouse, Brisbane, Australia (19-24/9), C & I Hall, Bangalow NSW Australia (25-30/9).
- 2006 Karma Phuntsok and Birgitte Hanson Dharma Studio, Coconut Grove, Miami Fl.USA (6/5-2/6+).
- 2006 Visions of Tibet Bendigo, Victoria Australia (April–June).
- 2006 Waves on the Turquoise Lake: Contemporary Expressions of Tibetan Art CU Art Museum, Boulder CO USA (14/9-20/10).
- 2005 Rethinking Tradition: Contemporary Tibetan Artists in the West Emory U. Visual Arts Gallery, Atlanta USA (28/10-3/12).
- 2005 Tibet Art Exhibition Queen's Hall, Parliament House, Melbourne Australia (14-16/6).
- 2005 Old Soul, New Art Tibet House, New York NY USA (25/2-6/5); ICT, Washington DC (12/5-12/7).
- 2004 Tibet in a Red Box Metro Arts, Main Gallery, Brisbane City, Australia (10-17/3).
- 2004 Breath of Tibet: Shangrila in Our Midst People of the World Gallery, Otago Museum, Dunedin SI New Zealand (March–May).
- 2003 Pathway to Enlightenment: Art of Tibet from Australian Collections Perc Tucker Regional Gallery, Townsville Qld Australia (5/9-2/11).
- 2003 Isle of Refuge Ivan Dougherty Gallery UNSW, Sydney, Australia (12/6-19/7)
- 2003 The Touring Blake Exhibition ACU National Gallery, Strathfield Campus, Sydney, Australia (29/5-21/6)
- 2002-03 Blake Prize Exhibition Casula Powerhouse Arts Centre, Sydney Australia 6/12-26/1)
- 2002 Towards a Free Tibet Span Galler, Melbourne Australia(30/4-4/5)
- 2001-02 Blake Prize Exhibition, S H Ervin Gallery, National Trust Centre, Observatory Hill, Sydney.
- 2001-02 The Natives Are Friendly Kyogle Arts Council, Roxy Gallery, Kyogle NSW Australia (23/11-16/1).
- 2001 Expressions of Faith by Shenpen Australia, Odiyana Centre, Melbourne Australia (16-25/11).
- 2001 Buddhas and Bodhisattvas Parkham Place Gallery Sydney Australia (9/11-?)2001-02 Buddha: Radiant Awakening Art Gallery of NSW Sydney Australia (10/11-24/2).
- 2001-02 My Le Thi & Tim Johnson Yab Yum AGNSW Contemporary projects, Art Gallery of NSW Sydney Australia (10/11-13/1).
- 2001 Three Views of Emptiness; Buddhism and the art of Tim Johnson, Lindy Lee and Peter Tyndall Monash University Museum of Art Melbourne Australia (9/10-24/11).
- 2001 10/4 Tibetan Freedom Festival: Survival of the Spirit at Boggo Rd Gaol, Brisbane Qld Australia
- 2000 27/10-22/11 Woghun by Kyogle Arts Council, Roxy Gallery, Kyogle NSW Australia
- 1999 27-28/11 Expressions of Faith by Dzogchen Shri senha Charitable Society, at Olevano, Vaucluse NSW.
- 1999 9/9-26/1/2000 The Third Asia-Pacific Triennial of Contemporary Art at Queensland Art Gallery, Brisbane Qld Australia
- 1999 7-15/5/99 Fine Arts Time in’99 Kyogle Arts Council, Kyogle NSW Australia.
- 1998 26/11-19/12/98 Members Exhibition - Gallery 4A, Sydney NSW.
- 1998 11-28 Nov. Tim Johnson & Karma Phuntsok at Bellas Gallery, Brisbane QLD.
- 1998-99 ways of being - Ivan Dougherty Gallery, University of NSW, Paddington Sydney NSW, touring 1999.
- 1997 21 June–October. Inside International Art Exhibition by Project Group Stoffwechsel, University of Kassel, Germany.
- 1997 23–31 May. Art Attack 97 Exhibition by Kyogle Arts Council, Kyogle NSW.
- 1995 Tibetan Fair - Powerhouse Museum, Sydney NSW Australia.
- 1995 Arts Alive in '95 - Kyogle Arts Council - Memorial Hall, Kyogle NSW Australia.
- 1994 Postcodes, Arts Council NSW, Sydney then rural circuit May to Dec.
- 1994 Kyogle Visual Arts Council Exhibition - The Chocolate Factory, Lismore NSW Australia.
- 1994 North Coast Art Show 1993-94 -The Epicentre, Byron Bay NSW Australia.
- 1993 St. Mary's Art Show - St. Mary's College, Toowoomba QLD Australia (Sept.).
- 1993 Australian Craft Show, Sydney NSW Australia.
- 1993 Tibetan Fair at Sydney University, Sydney NSW Australia.
- 1993 Orange Regional Gallery. Exhibited with Tim Johnson.
- 1993 Ninth Biennale of Sydney - Art Gallery of NSW, Sydney NSW Australia.
- 1993 Mori Gallery, Leichhardt (Sydney) NSW Australia.
- 1992 Fairy Mount Festival Exhibition, Memorial Hall, Kyogle NSW Australia.
- 1992 Tibetan Carnival- Sydney University, Sydney NSW Australia.
- 1992 The Living Mandala - Access Gallery, National Gallery of Victoria, Melbourne-Victoria-Australia.
- 1991 Art Works for Living - Memorial Hall, Kyogle NSW Australia.
- 1991 Tibetan Fair - Sydney University, Sydney NSW Australia.
- 1990 Exhibition Year of Tibet Exhibition - Sydney University, Sydney NSW Australia.
- 1989 Tibet Himalaya Festival - Melbourne, Victoria Australia.
- 1989 1989 Arts and Craft Exhibition - Memorial Hall, Kyogle NSW Australia.
- 1987-1989 Annual Fairy Mount Art Exhibition, Kyogle NSW Australia.
- 1989 Tibetan Carnivale - Ku-ring-gai Community Art Centre, Roseville, NSW Australia.
- 1987 Festival of Tibet - Melbourne, Victoria Australia.
- 1987 Bentleigh Art Exhibition - Bentleigh Hall, Bentleigh, NSW Australia.

== Public collections ==
Lowe Art Museum (Miami, USA), Perc Tucker Regional Gallery (Townsville, Australia), Queensland Art Gallery, Melbourne University, Art Gallery of New South Wales, Amnye Machen Institute (Dharamshala, India) Various Buddhist Centres worldwide

== Art prizes ==
- Mossman Art Prize (1999)
- SCEGGS Redlands Art Prize (1999)

== Selected bibliography ==
- Allica, Greer, Meditation Workbook, David Lovell Publishing, Victoria, Australia, 1990, cover.
- Amnye Machen Institute, Continuum, The Paintings of Karma Phuntsok, Amnye Machen Institute, Dharamshala India, 1999.
- Dondrup, Tsering, "A Show to Delight the Masses", Persimmon, vI, No.3, 2001 Contemporary Asian Culture, New York NY pp. 60–77.
- Drury, Nevill and Anna Voigt, Fire and Shadow: Spirituality in Contemporary Australian Art, Craftsman House, Roseville East, 1996, pp. 11, 113, 115.
- Drury, Nevill and Anna Voigt, Bringing It All Back Home, G+B Arts International, Singapore, #4, 1996, p. 38-43.
- Chee, Linda, Lauren Broos and Lisa Slade, In The Picture: Framing the Visual Arts, Oxford University Press, Melbourne, 1995, p. 45-47.
- Drury, Nevill, Images 2, Contemporary Australian Painting, Craftsman House, Roseville East, 1994. Plate 157.
- Green, Charles, "Tim Johnson", Art + Text - No. 46, Sept 1993, Art + Text Pty. Ltd, Paddington, NSW. p. 82.
- Guggenheim Foundation, Antipodean Currents: Ten contemporary Artists from Australia, New York NY, 1995, p. 59.
- "La creacion artistica de Karma", Planeta Humano , No.12, Feb 1999, Planeta Humano S.L., Madrid, Spain, p. 14.
- Lake, D., "Living Mandalas", Craft Arts International, No. 28, 1993, Craft-Art Pty Ltd, Sydney. pp. 55–57.
- Monash University Museum of art. Three Views of Emptiness; Buddhism and the art of Tim Johnson, Lindy Lee and Peter Tyndall Catalogue 10/2001 Edition 500 Monash University Museum of Art, Melbourne Australia pp. 12, 13, 23, 29, 30.
- New York Spirit, May 2005, cover.
- Park, A., Fox, S.O. and Clarke, S., Beyond Black and White, The many faces of Australia, Portside Ed., Melbourne, 1995. pp. 100–101.
- Steiner, M., "Tibetan Artist in Exile", Simply Living, Vol. 3, No. 10, Otter Publications, Terrey Hills NSW. pp. 48–52.
- "Thangka Artist Karma Phuntsok", TAASA Review: The Journal of the Asian Arts Society of Australia, vol. 8, no. 4, Dec 1999, ‘Special issue on Buddhism’, p. 23.
- "Ways of Being", Artreach, Summer 1998, Arts Council of New South Wales, p. 29.

== Professional activities ==
Tuition and courses have been given to many private individuals, communities and Commonwealth Youth Support Schemes, since coming to Australia. Collaborative works (mostly with Tim Johnson since 1992) have appeared in various exhibitions and publications (not listed here).
