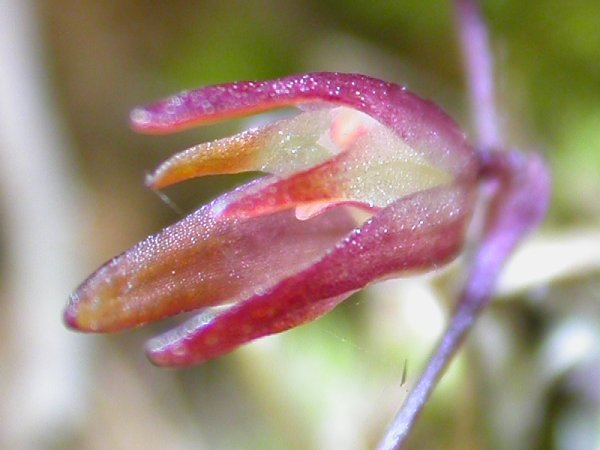

Scientific classification
- Kingdom: Plantae
- Clade: Tracheophytes
- Clade: Angiosperms
- Clade: Monocots
- Order: Asparagales
- Family: Orchidaceae
- Subfamily: Epidendroideae
- Genus: Anathallis
- Species: A. graveolens

Binomial name
- Anathallis graveolens (Pabst) F. Barros (2006)

Synonyms
- Pleurothallis graveolens Pabst (1975) (Basionym); Specklinia graveolens (Pabst) Luer (2004)

= Anathallis graveolens =

Species of orchid

Anathallis graveolens is a species of orchid.
