= DeSoL (album) =

deSoL

Studio album by deSoL
- Released: July 2005
- Recorded: 2003–2005
- Genre: Rock/Latin rock
- Length: 52:09
- Label: Curb Records
- Producer: Franke Previte & Michael Lloyd

DeSoL chronology
Spanish Radio (2001)	deSoL (2005)	LiVe/ViVo (2006)

Professional ratings
Review scores
Source	Rating
Allmusic	4/5 stars

deSoL is the first major album release by the Latin rock band, deSoL. This album was released twice, first in 2004 with a release party at the Mercury Lounge in New York City, and second in 2005 with a different track listing.

== Track listing ==
1. "Chango" (Cabrera, Guerrero, Guice, Letke, J.C. Monterrosa, Dominick Prevete, Soto) – 3:31
2. "Blanco y Negro" (Guice, Letke, Monterrosa) – 3:54
3. "Chica de Miami" (Cabrera, Guerrero, Guice, Letke, J.C. Monterrosa, Soto) – 3:59
4. "White Dove (Paloma)" (Cabrera, Dave Greenberg, Guerrero, J.C. Monterrosa, Previte, Soto) – 4:18
5. "Spanish Radio" (Cabrera, Monterrosa) – 3:37
6. "Band Leader" (Guice, Letke, Monterrosa) – 3:55
7. "Spin Around" (Addeo, Guerrero, Monterrosa) – 3:43
8. "Karma" (Cabrera, Guerrero, Guice, Letke, J.C. Monterrosa, Prevete, Soto) – 4:02
9. "La Musica" (Guerrero, Guice, J.C. Monterrosa, Previte, Soto) – 3:19
10. "Amazed" (Monterrosa, Soto) – 4:15
11. "Urgency" (Monterrosa, Romay) – 3:37
12. "My Affection" (Monterrosa) – 3:28
13. "See You Again Soon" (Cabrera, J.C. Monterrosa, Bill Withers) – 3:32
14. "Cumbia Raza" () – 3:34
15. "America, Mi Radio" () – 3:43

== Personnel ==
deSoL

- Albie Monterrosa - acoustic guitar, vocals
- Andy Letke - piano, organ, vocals
- Jamz Guerreo - percussion, vocals
- Chris Guice - bass guitar, vocals, trumpet

Additional personnel:

- Armando Cabrera - percussion
- Soto - Lead guitar, vocals
- Ron Shields - drums
- "TOP" Tim Perry - drums
- George Saccal - drums
- Franke Previte - backing vocals

== Production ==
- Producer: Franke Previte & Michael Lloyd
- Engineers: Steve Greenwell, Bob Kearney, James Delatacoma
- Production Coordination: Benita Brazier
- Art: Amy Johnson
- Photography: Danny Sanchez Photographer
- Accounting: Paul Fried

== Charts ==
Singles
Year	Single	Chart	Position
2006	"Karma"	Triple A	5
2006	"Blanco y Negro"	Triple A	26
