= Karma Nightclub & Cabaret =

Former gay nightclub in Lincoln, Nebraska

- Interactive map of Karma Nightclub & Cabaret
- Former names: The Q/Club Q
- Address: 226 S 9th St
- Location: Lincoln, Nebraska
- Coordinates: 40°48′42.9″N 96°42′28.9″W
- Type: Gay nightclub

Construction
- Groundbreaking: 1995
- Renovated: 2013–14
- Closed: 2015

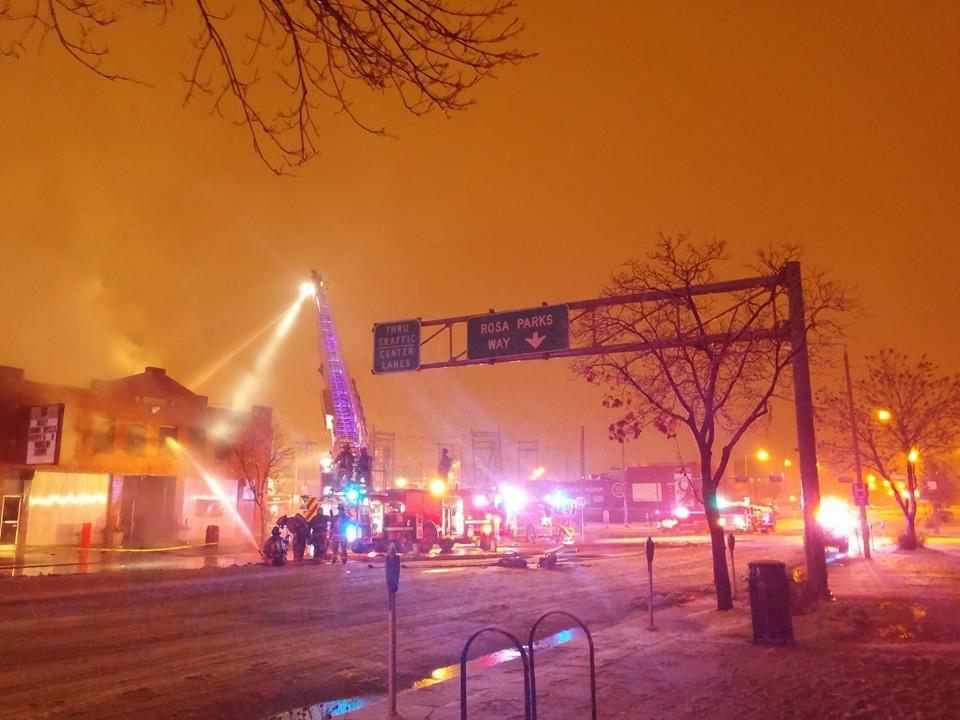
Later stages of the fire which gutted Karma nightclub in 2015

Karma Nightclub & Cabaret (formerly The Q/Club Q) was a gay nightclub in downtown Lincoln, Nebraska. Originally opened as The Q in April 1995, it closed abruptly following a Halloween event in 2013, and re-opened months later under new ownership as Karma. The building housing the club was destroyed in a fire on January 31, 2015.

The club existed in a nondescript building with spare outdoor lighting, in an area southwest of Lincoln's primary downtown bar district, and southeast of the Haymarket. It was by far Lincoln's largest and most prominent gay club, with a full theatrical stage, 15,000-watt sound system, and 6,000 sq ft surrounding the primary bar and dance floor.

== Re-branding ==
After The Q shut its doors on November 1, 2013, local news reported that the club was in arrears to the Internal Revenue Service, and in debt to private lenders—though this did not contribute directly to The Q's closing. The club said it could not sustain itself for the week after a deposit of $3,000 was stolen from the bar, asking patrons to return the following weekend, however the club remained closed.

Following a period of uncertainty, the nightclub re-opened under new ownership on January 24, 2014. $100,000 in remodeling brought a new central bar design and skylights to the main room, but no pivotal changes were made to the club's operation.

== Fire ==
On Saturday, January 31, 2015, the building housing Karma was destroyed in a four-alarm fire which began in the stage area about 7:15 pm, ahead of a planned night of performances. The fire gutted the building, causing a roof collapse and a power outage in surrounding areas.
