= Karma (novel) =

2014 novel by Karanam Pavan Prasad

- First edition
- Author: Karanam Pavan Prasad
- Original title: ಕರ್ಮ
- Language: Kannada
- Subject: Philosophy, Contemporary
- Genre: Philosophical fiction
- Published: 2014 Concave Media co., Bangalore
- Publication place: India
- Media type: Print (Paper Back)
- Pages: 162
- Preceded by: Purahara
- Followed by: Nunni

Karma is a 2014 novel written by Karanam Pavan Prasad. Karma is a contemporary novel dealing with inner conflicts such as identity, faith with respect to the ritual orthodoxy and customs of the society. It The novel thoroughly narrates the difference between Faith and Belief in such a way that each and every character, including the protagonist of the novel get penetrated by that derivation. Details documented about the Hindu death rituals within the story-line are absolute novel writing technique adopted by the writer. The novel got an immense response from the literature world. Within the year of its release Novel went on with third edition and reached worldwide Kannada readers.

== Characters ==
- Surendra
- Neha Jeevanthi
- Venkatesha Bhatta
- Narahari
- Purushottama
- Srikannta Joeesaru
