= Karma-Ann Swanepoel =

- Origin: South Africa
- Occupation: Singer
- Formerly of: Henry Ate
- Website: www.theofficialkarmasite.com

Karma-Ann Swanepoel was the lead singer of Henry Ate, a South African rock band. She subsequently went solo, releasing her first album Karma in 1998. The South African-born singer shot to fame in the mid-1990s with hit songs such as "Just" and "Henry Ate".

== Career ==
Swanepoel attained success in South Africa. Her song "Just" was counted as No. 1 in the 5FM 2001 countdown. Karma moved to the US in 2003.

Her musical style encompasses folk, acoustic, and South African harmony.

=== Civil litigation with Lil Wayne ===
Henry Ate's/Karma's song "Once" was sampled by Lil Wayne in the mixtape track, "I Feel Like Dying". The lawsuit accuses the recording artist of copyright infringement. Karma-Ann Swanepoel claimed Lil Wayne did not have permission to sample the song and is suing for compensatory damages. Lil Wayne did not profit directly from the song – it was leaked to the internet and passed via peer-to-peer websites and not sold on any retail album.

== Discography ==
- Slap in the Face [1996]
- One Day Soon (as Karma) [1998]
- Torn and Tattered [2000]
- 96 - 02 - The Singles [2002]
- Don't Walk Fly [2005]
- Working Title [2005]
- Even If She Tried [2008]
- Paper Cuts [2008]
