= Kamma, India =

Kamma
- village
- Location in Punjab, India Kamma (India)
- Coordinates: 30°41′26.85″N 76°7′4.07″E
- Country: India
- State: Punjab
- District: Ludhiana

Population (2011)
  - Total: 1,065

Languages
  - Official: Punjabi
  - Regional: Punjabi
- Time zone: UTC+5:30 (IST)

Kamma is a village located in Khanna tehsil, in the Ludhiana district of Punjab, India. The total population of the village is about 1,065.
