= Karma (play) =

Karma by Algernon Blackwood

- Written by: Algernon Blackwood
- Original language: English

Premiere
- Date premiered: 1918
- Place premiered: England

Karma is a play that was written by Algernon Blackwood with Violet Pearn and was published in 1918.

The play is arranged in five sections: a prologue, epilogue, and three acts. It is at once a romance, an expression of Blackwoods spirituality, and a work of wartime homefront propaganda. It contains many connections to Blackwood's corpus of writing.

== Plot ==
The plot concerns the romantic relationship between the central couple, one that has extended across multiple lifetimes. The prologue and epilogue are set in the present day—in London during the final year of the first world war. The chapters are set in Ancient Egypt, Ancient Greece, and Renaissance Italy, respectively.

In ancient Egypt, a young man bound for priesthood, Menophis, experiences a conflict between the duty of his calling to the god Aton and his love for the dancing girl, Nefertiti. At the Tear of Isis, the flooding of the Nile, the two make a lifetime commitment to each other, one that is to extend to all future lives. A shooting star divinely affirms their compact, the comet falling as Isis’s Tear falls, the oath is made, and the Nile floods. The pair are first reincarnated in late antiquity as the Athenian general Phocion and his wife Lydia in Athens, Greece where again Phocion’s love and duty conflict. They next appear as Paulo Salviati and his wife Lucia during the Renaissance in Venice Italy and experience similar conflict.

The pair are reincarnated yet a third time and we encounter them during the final year of the first world war as Phillip Lattin and his wife Mrs. Lattin. He is a British agent whose duty is to return to Egypt, a prospect that is intolerable to her, this state manifesting itself as illness. Though past life regression Dr. Ogilvie, who specializes in maladies of the soul, brings her to understand that the problem is rooted in the legacy of their past lives. Resolution is reached. The cycle is broken and duty fulfilled as they resume their plans to travel to Egypt. The Lattins appear in the Prologue and Epilogue while their prior lives are presented in Acts 1, 2, and 3.

== Characters ==
- Prologue / Epilogue
  - Phillip Lattin
  - Mrs. Lattin
  - The Doctor (Dr. Ogilvie)
  - Nurse
- Act 1
  - Menophis
  - Nefertiti
  - Sethos
  - Rames (High Priest of Aton)
- Act 2
  - Phocion
  - Lydia
  - Lysander (Phocion’s brother)
  - Alexander the Great
  - Athenians
- Act 3
  - Paulo Salviati
  - Lucia
  - Prince Damiano di Medici

== Reception ==
The book's release was widely noted and the book widely reviewed. Contemporary critical reviews were mixed.

The script was produced in hardcover, purchased at retail by readers, as well as used for performance. The announcement of a 1925 partial student production in Australia makes clear that the work was internationally known at that time.

== Relationship with other works ==
- John Silence: The character of The Doctor though called by another name in the text, is clearly Algernon Blackwood’s best known character, the “psychical doctor“ whose “cases are those involving the rescue of patients’ souls“ and indeed “is Algernon Blackwood himself“. Thus, this story is connected to the other John Silence stories: Ancient Sorceries, A Psychical Invasion, Secret Worship, The Camp of the Dog, The Nemesis of Fire, and A Victim of Higher Space.
- Isis: As the epitome of the mourning widow, the goddess’s tears equates with the flooding of the Nile, thus she is invoked by Menophis and Nefertiti as they exchange vows at the Tear of Isis, committing to share their present and future lives. The goddess is seen to bless their vow with a meteor that passes overhead. Isis’s own marriage to Osiris transcended life as their son Horus was conceived after his father’s death; a transcendence that she has now extended to this non-divine couple. Isis’s role as widow would have been trenchant for a war-time audience on the home-front and Egyptian themes including Isis were elements important to Theosophy, Rosicrucianism, and the Hermetic Order of the Golden Dawn: all movements that played a role in Blackwood’s spiritual thinking. Isis directly links this story to his earlier short story, The Wings of Horus. In addition to her role as widow and mother, Isis is also seen as a psychopomp, a guide for the dead to the afterlife. When Blackwood wrote his own psychopomp character in the 1907 story The Dance of Death, he invokes this role for Isis, using the cognate “Issidy” thus linking that story to this one.
