= Henry Ate =

Henry Ate is a South African band that came to fame in the mid-1990s, headed up at the time by lead singer Karma-Ann Swanepoel, who relocated to South Florida in 2003 and Julian Sun.

According to the band's Myspace page, "[t]he band formed in 1996, when guitarist Julian Sun was playing at a music festival with the band Urban Creep and invited Karma out of the audience to sing. The resulting impromptu performance encouraged them to create their own group".

In 2024, Henry Ate released their first new single in 22 years titled "You Were My First Everything".

== Discography ==
=== Slap in the Face (Tic Tic Bang, 1996) ===
1. "Jesus made me"
2. "Hey Mister"
3. "Mother Superior"
4. "Pandora's Child"
5. "Fashionably Large"
6. "Waves of Salt"
7. "Eudaimonia"
8. "Henry"
9. "Mr Blue"
10. "No Intrusion"
11. "So He Says"
12. "Station Bench"
13. "Just"

=== One Day Soon (as Karma) (Primedia Record Company, 1998) ===
1. "One Day Soon"
2. "Dr Pepper"
3. "X-Rated Fun"
4. "Indian Giver"
5. "Delorise' Point"
6. "Days Like These"
7. "Three Wishes"
8. "Tuesday Afternoon"
9. "I'm Tempted to Stay"
10. "Seconds Count"
11. "All the Same (Crazy)"
12. "Pachelbel"

=== Torn and Tattered (EMI, 2000) ===
1. "She's Alright"
2. "Madhatter"
3. "Two Seconds"
4. "I'll be Fine"
5. "You can Change"
6. "Sunshine"
7. "Isn't"
8. "#28"
9. "Prayer"
10. "Fat Lady"
11. "Seems Like"
12. "Saints and Sinners"
13. "I should've Known"
14. "The Whistle Song"
15. "Happy"

=== 96 - 02 - The Singles (2002) ===
1. "Jesus Made Me"
2. "Henry"
3. "Just"
4. "Hey Mister"
5. "Dr Pepper"
6. "Tuesday Afternoon"
7. "One Day Soon"
8. "Seconds Count"
9. "Madhatter"
10. "She's Alright"
11. "Prayer"
12. "Saints and Sinners"
13. "Outside"
14. "Life"
15. "Hey Boy"
16. "Finally"
