= Karanam Pavan Prasad =

Indian author, artist and playwright

- Born: Bangalore, Karnataka, India
- Education: Bangalore University
- Occupations: Novelist, Playwright
- Writing career
- Genres: Fiction, Drama
- Subjects: Philosophy, Contemporary, History
- Notable works: Karma; Nunni

Karanam Pavan Prasad is an Indian author, novelist and playwright in Kannada language. He gained notability with his first novel Karma. His second novel was Nunni. He is regarded as one of the most renowned and influential writers of the new generation of Kannada literature.

== Early life ==
Prasad was born in the Bangalore district in Karnataka. He graduated with a Bachelor of Science degree from Bangalore University.

== Career ==
He started his career as a theatre director and playwright. He is working as a User Interface Designer, simultaneously engaging himself in research, literature study and writing. His theatrical productions led him to Kannada literature. His second play Purahara was well-received by theatre enthusiasts, he acted in the role of Arab Adil Shaw. In 2013 he took a break from theatre to focus on Karma. Initially, he received accolades from S. L. Bhyrappa, while Karma garnered both appreciation and criticism for its bold craftsmanship and conservative undertones. Karma was later translated into English.

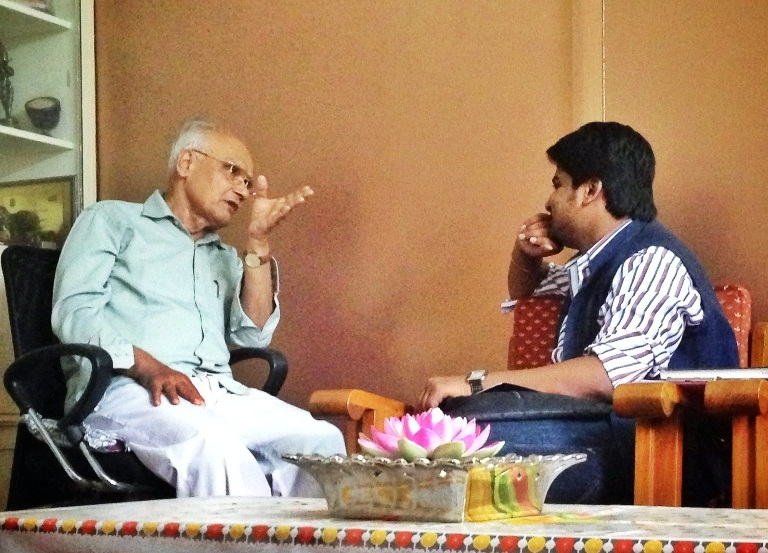
Karanam Pavan Prasad Discussing the novel Karma with Novelist SL Bhyrappa in 2013

His second novel Nunni was released on 25 September 2015. It made a critical analysis of Christian missionaries. Nun is the protagonist. Prasad was than listed as a prominent Kannada writer. His 'Mother Elisa' character resembles Mother Teresa, It raised significant debates about truth, harmony, and service. His novel Grastha considered science and philosophy based on Indian aesthetics. Subsequently, he authored a novel titled "Rayakonda" in the dark humor genre, which garnered varied responses and was subsequently hailed as a new direction in his writing style and intellectual journey He is a best-selling novelist. Sattu is his fifth novel, characterized by an intricate blend of philosophical and surreal themes.

== Bempura Margam ==
Released on October 11, 2026, Bempura Margam, by Karanam, is a Kannada literary revivalist epic in prose. Set against the historical backdrop of the Kannada kingdoms during the transitional era of the 7th century, the work stands as a meticulously researched and imaginatively realised historical epic. It introduces an entirely new literary genre, seamlessly weaving together the grandeur of epic poetry and the psychological depth and narrative subtlety of the modern novel. Hailed by Prof. Hampanā as a magnum opus.

First edtion cover of Bempura Margam

== Epic ==
1. Bempura Margam (ಬೆಂಪೂರ ಮಾರ್ಗಂ) 2026

== Plays ==
1. Beedi Bimba Rangada Tumba (ಬೀದಿ ಬಿಂಬ ರಂಗದ ತುಂಬ) 2011
2. Purahara (ಪುರಹರ) 2012
3. Bhava Enage Hingitu (ಭವ ಎನಗೆ ಹಿಂಗಿತು) 2017
4. Cleopatrala Kone Maga (ಕ್ಲಿಯೋಪಾತ್ರಾಳ ಕೊನೇ ಮಗ) 2025

== Novels ==
1. Karma (ಕರ್ಮ) 2014
2. Nunni (ನನ್ನಿ) 2015
3. Grastha (ಗ್ರಸ್ತ) 2017
4. Rayakonda (ರಾಯಕೊಂಡ) 2020
5. Sattu (ಸತ್ತು) 2022

== Translations ==
1. Karma (English) 2015

== Seminar Paper ==
1. 'Parva'da Krishna : Rajatantra mattu Rajakarana (ಪರ್ವದ ಕೃಷ್ಣ : ರಾಜತಂತ್ರ ಮತ್ತು ರಾಜಕಾರಣ)
2. Hosa Odugana Jagattu (ಹೊಸ ಓದುಗನ ಜಗತ್ತು)
