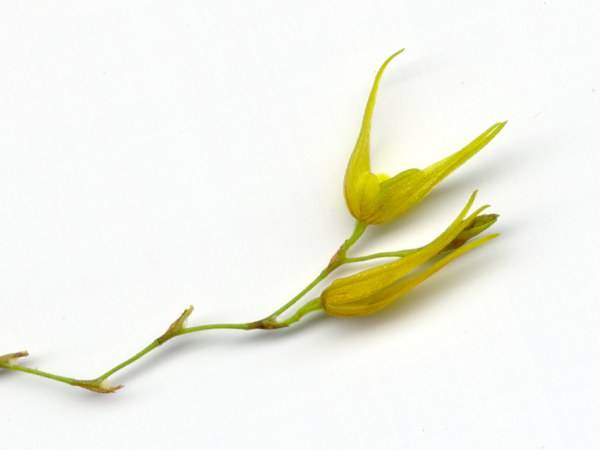
- Karma montana flowers

Scientific classification
- Kingdom: Plantae
- Clade: Tracheophytes
- Clade: Angiosperms
- Clade: Monocots
- Order: Asparagales
- Family: Orchidaceae
- Subfamily: Epidendroideae
- Tribe: Epidendreae
- Subtribe: Pleurothallidinae
- Genus: Karma
- Species: K. montana

Binomial name
- Karma montana (Barb.Rodr.) Karremans

Synonyms
- Lepanthes montana Barb.Rodr. (basionym); Lepanthes quartzicola Barb.Rodr.; Pleurothallis collina Cogn.; Pleurothallis collina var. minor Cogn.; Pleurothallis quartzicola (Barb.Rodr.) Cogn.; Pleurothallis lepanthipoda Hoehne & Schltr.; Trichosalpinx montana (Barb.Rodr.) Luer; Trichosalpinx quartzicola (Barb.Rodr.) Luer; Tubella montana (Barb.Rodr.) Archila

= Karma montana =

Species of orchid

Karma montana is a species of orchid native to eastern and southern Brazil. The Latin specific epithet montana refers to mountains or coming from mountains.
