= Karma (plant) =

Scientific classification
- Kingdom: Plantae
- Clade: Tracheophytes
- Clade: Angiosperms
- Clade: Monocots
- Order: Asparagales
- Family: Orchidaceae
- Subfamily: Epidendroideae
- Tribe: Epidendreae
- Subtribe: Pleurothallidinae
- Genus: Karma; Karremans (2023)

Type species
- Karma arbuscula (Lindl.) Karremans

Species
- 74; see text

Synonyms
- Tubella (Luer) Archila (2000 publ. 2009), nom. illeg.

Genus of flowering plants

Karma is a genus of flowering plants in the orchid family, Orchidaceae. It includes 74 species native to the tropical Americas, ranging from southern Mexico through Central America, the Caribbean, and tropical South America to Bolivia and southern Brazil.

== Species ==
74 species are accepted.

- Karma acremona (Luer) Karremans
- Karma adnata (I.Jiménez) Karremans
- Karma alabastra (Luer & R.Escobar) Karremans
- Karma amygdalodora (Kraenzl.) Karremans
- Karma arbuscula (Lindl.) Karremans
- Karma atropurpurea (Luer & Hirtz) Karremans
- Karma ballatrix (Luer & R.Escobar) Karremans
- Karma barbelifera (Luer & R.Vásquez) Karremans
- Karma carinilabia (Luer) Karremans
- Karma carmeniae (Luer) Karremans
- Karma carvii (Archila) Karremans
- Karma cedralensis (Ames) Karremans
- Karma chaetoglossa (Luer) Karremans
- Karma costata (Luer & R.Vásquez) Karremans
- Karma crucilabia (Ames & Correll) Karremans
- Karma cunorensis (Archila) Karremans
- Karma dalstroemii (Luer) Karremans
- Karma dirhamphis (Luer) Karremans
- Karma dressleri (Luer) Karremans
- Karma drosoides (Carnevali & I.Ramírez) Karremans
- Karma dunstervillei (Luer) Karremans
- Karma dura (Lindl.) Karremans
- Karma escobarii (Luer) Karremans
- Karma fasciculata (Luer & Hirtz) Karremans
- Karma fissa (Luer) Karremans
- Karma fruticosa (Luer) Karremans
- Karma gabi-villegasiae (I.Jiménez) Karremans
- Karma gentryi (Luer) Karremans
- Karma giovi-mendietae (I.Jiménez) Karremans
- Karma hamiltonii (Luer) Karremans
- Karma hirtzii (Luer) Karremans
- Karma hypocrita (Garay & Dunst.) Karremans
- Karma inaequisepala (C.Schweinf.) Karremans
- Karma intricata (Lindl.) Karremans
- Karma jimburae (Luer & Hirtz) Karremans
- Karma jostii (Luer & Dalström) Karremans
- Karma lamellata (Luer) Karremans
- Karma lenticularis (Luer) Karremans
- Karma ligulata (Luer & Hirtz) Karremans
- Karma lilliputalis (Luer & Hirtz) Karremans
- Karma macphersonii (Luer) Karremans
- Karma membraniflora (C.Schweinf.) Karremans
- Karma metamorpha (Luer & Hirtz) Karremans
- Karma montana (Barb.Rodr.) Karremans
- Karma multicuspidata (Rchb.f.) Karremans
- Karma nana (Ames & C.Schweinf.) Karremans
- Karma notosibirica (T.Hashim.) Karremans
- Karma nymphalis (Luer) Karremans
- Karma otarion (Luer) Karremans
- Karma parsonsii (Luer & Dod) Karremans
- Karma pumila (Luer) Karremans
- Karma pusilla (Kunth) Karremans
- Karma quitensis (Rchb.f.) Karremans
- Karma reticulata (Thoerle & C.Soto) Karremans
- Karma robledorum (Luer & R.Escobar) Karremans
- Karma scabridula (Rolfe) Karremans
- Karma sipapoensis (G.A.Romero & Luer) Karremans
- Karma solomonii (Luer) Karremans
- Karma steyermarkii (Luer) Karremans
- Karma strumifera (Luer) Karremans
- Karma systremmata (Luer) Karremans
- Karma tantilla (Luer) Karremans
- Karma teaguei (Luer) Karremans
- Karma tenuiflora (Schltr.) Karremans
- Karma tenuis (C.Schweinf.) Karremans
- Karma teres (Luer) Karremans
- Karma todziae (Luer) Karremans
- Karma trilobata (Fawc. & Rendle) Karremans
- Karma tropida (Luer) Karremans
- Karma vagans (Garay & Dunst.) Karremans
- Karma webbiae (Luer & R.Escobar) Karremans
- Karma werneri (Luer) Karremans
- Karma wilhelmii (Luer) Karremans
- Karma yanganensis (Luer) Karremans
