= Kam (disambiguation) =

Kam or Kaam (from Sanskrit: kama) means deep extensive desire, often sexual, and is counted among the cardinal sins in Sikhism.

Kam or KAM may also refer to:

== People and language ==
- Kam (name), a list of people with either the given name, nickname or surname
- Kam people, a Kadai people in China
  - Kam language, spoken in China
- K. A. Manoharan (born 1951), nicknamed K.A.M., Indian politician
- Kam (rapper), born Craig A. Miller in 1969
- Kam language (Nigeria) or Nyingwom, spoken in eastern Nigeria
- Kams or the Kok people, a Nuristani tribe in Afghanistan and Pakistan
- Kam (folklore), a spiritual practitioner or shaman in the traditional cultures of the Turkic, Altai, and Mongolian peoples

== Businesses ==
- Kam Air, an airline headquartered in Kabul, Afghanistan
- KAM Manufacturing, a handbag manufacturer in Ohio, United States

== Places ==
- Kám, Hungary, a village
- Kam, Mazandaran, Iran, a village
- Kam, West Azerbaijan, Iran, a village
- Kam Group, Northwest Territories, Canada, a volcanic group
- Kam River, a nickname for the Kaministiquia River in Ontario, Canada
- Kampung Rambutan LRT station, a light rail station in Jakarta, Indonesia

== KAM ==
- Kentucky Active Militia, a state defense force active during World War II
- Key account management, the idea of looking after large and important accounts that are critical to a business
- Knowledge Assessment Methodology, an interactive benchmarking tool to help countries make the transition to a knowledge-based economy
- Kolmogorov–Arnold–Moser theorem
- Komite-ye Amniyat-e Melli (National Security Committee), the forerunner of KHAD, the secret police of the Democratic Republic of Afghanistan
- Krannert Art Museum, on the campus of the University of Illinois
- KAM, a post-nominal awarded to recipients of the King's Ambulance Service Medal

== Other uses ==
- Kam (pastry), a Danish pastry known in the United States as a bear claw
- King's Ambulance Service Medal, a British award with the post-nominal letters KAM

== See also ==
- Kama (disambiguation)
- Cam (disambiguation)
