= Khama =

Khama is the name of the royal family of the Bamangwato people of Botswana. As such, it may refer to:

- Khama III (1837? – 1923), kgosi (chief/king) of the Bamangwato people of Bechuanaland (now Botswana)
- Semane Setlhoko Khama (1881 – 1937), mohumagadi (queen) of the Bamangwato people of Bechuanaland, fourth wife of Khama III
- Tshekedi Khama (1905 – 1959), regent of the Bamangwato tribe in 1926 after the death of Sekgoma II
- Seretse Khama (1921 – 1980), the first President of Botswana, in office from 1966 to 1980
  - Sir Seretse Khama International Airport, named after the above
- Ruth Williams Khama (1923 – 2002), wife of Seretse Khama, First Lady of Botswana from 1966 to 1980
- Ian Khama (1953), first-born son of Seretse and Ruth Williams Khama and President of Botswana from 2008 to 2018
- Tshekedi Khama II (1958), son of Seretse and Ruth Williams Khama and a former Botswana MP

Other people with this name:

- Khama Billiat, a Zimbabwean professional footballer

In astronomy, 1357 Khama is a main-belt asteroid discovered on July 2, 1935, by Cyril Jackson.

Khama can also be a transliteration of Hebrew חַמָּה (chammah), meaning "heat"/"rage". When used as a proper noun, it can refer to both Mercury as well as the Sun.

== See also ==
- Karma, called "kamma" in Pali
- Kama, another concept from Indian religious thought
- Kamma (disambiguation)
- Cama (disambiguation)
- Qama, a short Persian sword
- Kahma, an Indian village
- Pentti Kahma, a retired discus thrower from Finland
- Kham, a historical region of Tibet
- Khamag Mongol, a major Mongolic tribal confederation in the 12th century
- Khamaj, a parent scale in Hindustani music
- Khamal (disambiguation)
- Khaman, an Indian dish
- Khamar, a village in Yemen
- Khamar Monastery, a Buddhist center in Mongolia
- Khamas, Khuzestan, an Iranian village
- Khamas (raga), a Carnatic music scale
- Birkat Hakhama, a Jewish blessing thanking God for creating the sun
- Khame Mi, the first chief queen consort of King Swa Saw Ke of the Ava Kingdom
- Khami, the now-ruined capital of the pre-colonial Kingdom of Butua
- Khamir (disambiguation)
- Khamis (disambiguation)
- Khamo, a village in Myanmar
- Khamachon, an Indian village
- Khamaneh, an Iranian city
- Khammam, an Indian city
- Khammu/Khmu, an ethnic group of Southeast Asia
- Ayya Khema, a Buddhist teacher
- Khoma, a progressive/alternative metal musical group from Sweden
- Khamsa (disambiguation)
- Kshama Sawant, an American socialist politician
- Khanna (disambiguation)
