= Kama (name) =

Kama is a given name and surname found among many cultures, developed independently from one another, throughout the world. The name is common among the Serer people in West Africa.

Notable people with the name include:

== Surname ==
- Ali ibn Kama (c.10th-cent.–976), Iranian royal, viceroy, and general
- Aliyu Kama (born 1949), Nigerian general and politician
- Kaido Kama (born 1957), Estonian politician, conservationist, and teacher
- Laity Kama (1939–2001), Senegalese barrister and judge
- Mesuli Kama (born ?), South African politician
- Moustapha Kama (born 1992), Senegalese taekwondo practitioner
- Nripa Kama II (fl.c.1026–c.1046), Indian monarch
- Steven Pirika Kama (1962/63–2016), Papua New Guinean politician

== Given name ==
- Kama Chinen (1895–2010), Japanese supercentenarian; among the longest-lived people in recorded history
- Kama Ginkas (born 1941), Russian theater director
- Kama Massampu (born 1991), French footballer
- Kama Mustafa (a.k.a. The Godfather (wrestler) or Charles Wright; born 1961), American wrestler and actor
- Kama Rathod (born ?), Indian politician
- Kama Steliga (born 1967), US-born Canadian civil rights activist
- Kama Sywor Kamanda (born 1952), Congolese poet, novelist, playwright, essayist, journalist, public speaker, and storyteller
- Kama Tarkhan (legendary), Altyn Obaic ancestral king

== See also ==
- Monduone N'Kama (born 1960), Congolese footballer
- Kama (disambiguation)
- Kama (name)
- Kamas (disambiguation)
- Kaja (name)
