= TMII LRT station =

Light rapid transit station in Indonesia

CB09 TMII
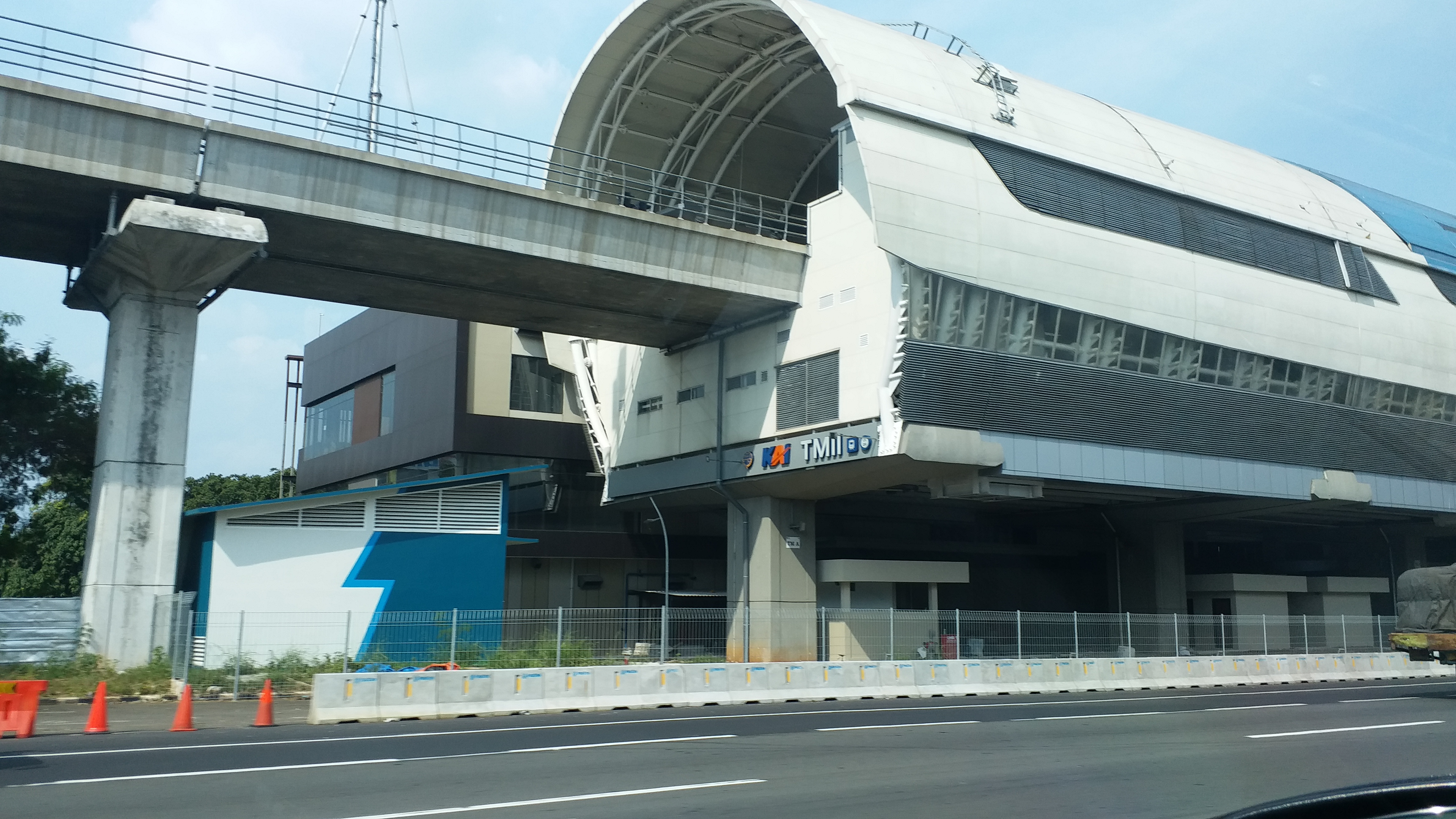
- TMII LRT Station seen from Toll Road, 2023

General information
- Location: Jalan Mabes Hankam, Pinang Ranti, Makasar, East Jakarta, Jakarta, Indonesia
- Coordinates: 6.292874°S 106.880535°E
- System: Jabodebek LRT station
- Owner: Ministry of Transportation via the Directorate General of Railways
- Manager: Kereta Api Indonesia
- Line: Cibubur Line
- Platforms: 2 side platforms
- Tracks: 2
- Connections: Makasar

Construction
- Structure type: Elevated
- Cycle facilities: Bicycle parking
- Accessible: Yes

Other information
- Station code: TMI

History
- Opened: 28 August 2023
- Electrified: 2019

Services
Preceding station		Following station
Cawang towards Dukuh Atas BNI	Cibubur Line	Kampung Rambutan towards Harjamukti
Route map
Location

TMII LRT Station, often referred to as Taman Mini LRT Station is a light rapid transit station located in Jalan Mabes Hankam, Pinang Ranti, Makasar, East Jakarta, Indonesia. The station serves the Cibubur line of the Jabodebek LRT system. The name is derived from Taman Mini Indonesia Indah (TMII) theme park located near the station, although access between is connected by Travoy Hub.

== Station layout ==
2nd floor	Side platform, the doors are opened on the right side
2nd floor	Line 1	← (Kampung Rambutan)	Cibubur Line to Harjamukti
2nd floor	Line 2		Cibubur Line to Dukuh Atas BNI	(Cawang) →
2nd floor	Side platform, the doors are opened on the right side
1st floor	Concourse	Ticket counter, ticket vending machines, fare gates, retail kiosks
Ground level	Street	Entrance/Exit and access to Makasar BRT Station

== Services ==
Cibubur Line

== Supporting transportation ==
Type	Station	Route	Destination
Transjakarta	Makasar (BRT Station)	List of TransJakarta corridors#Corridor 9	Pinang Ranti–Pluit
Transjakarta	Makasar (BRT Station)	List of TransJakarta corridors#Cross-corridor routes	Pinang Ranti–Bundaran Senayan
Transjakarta	Makasar (BRT Station)	List of TransJakarta corridors#Cross-corridor routes	Pinang Ranti–Simpang Cawang
Transjakarta (Non-BRT)	Tamini Square 1 and Tamini Square 2 (Bus stops)		TMII–Pancoran
Mikrotrans	Tamini Square 1 and Tamini Square 2 (Bus stops)	JAK36	Cilangkap–Cililitan
Mikrotrans	Garuda Taman Mini 1 and Pondok Gede Raya (Bus stops)	JAK71	Kampung Rambutan–Pinang Ranti
Mikrotrans	Tamini Square 1 and Tamini Square 2 (Bus stops)	JAK108	Kramat Jati-Bambu Apus
