= Kam, Iran =

Kam (Persian: كام or كم) in Iran may refer to:

- Kam, Mazandaran (كام - Kām)
- Kam, West Azerbaijan (كم - Kam)
