= Kampung Rambutan LRT station =

Light rapid transit station in Indonesia

CB10 Kampung Rambutan
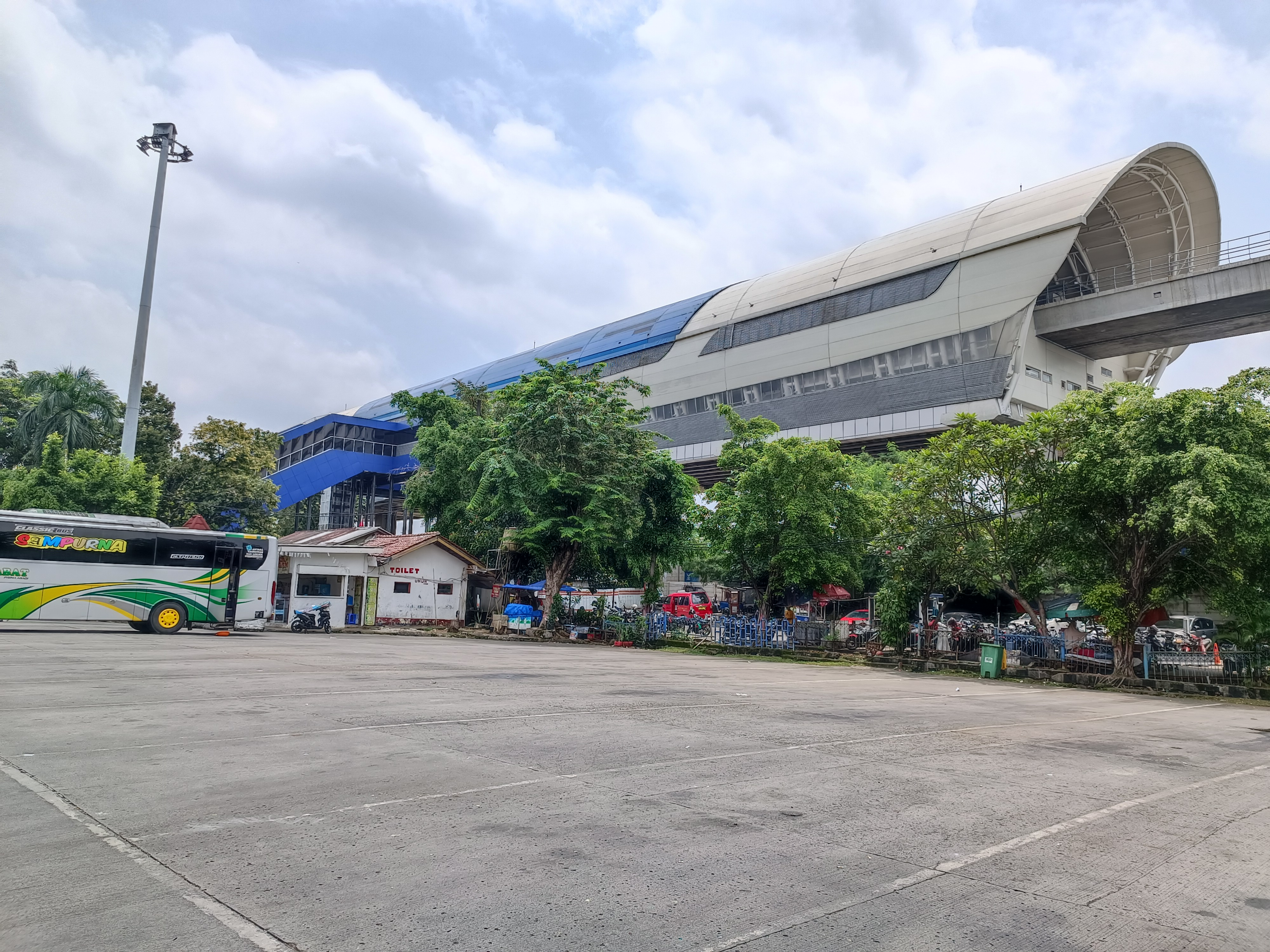
- Kampung Rambutan LRT Station outside view, 2023

General information
- Location: Jalan Bungur, Rambutan, Ciracas, East Jakarta, Jakarta, Indonesia
- Coordinates: 6.309541°S 106.884325°E
- System: Jabodebek LRT station
- Owner: Ministry of Transportation via the Directorate General of Railways
- Manager: Kereta Api Indonesia
- Line: Cibubur Line
- Platforms: 2 side platforms
- Tracks: 2
- Connections: Kampung Rambutan

Construction
- Structure type: Elevated
- Cycle facilities: Bicycle parking
- Accessible: Yes

Other information
- Station code: KAM

History
- Opened: 28 August 2023
- Electrified: 2019

Services
Preceding station		Following station
TMII towards Dukuh Atas BNI	Cibubur Line	Ciracas towards Harjamukti
Route map
Location

Kampung Rambutan LRT Station is a light rapid transit station located in Jalan Bungur, Rambutan, Ciracas, East Jakarta. The station serves the Cibubur line of the Jabodebek LRT system. The station is located inside the Kampung Rambutan Bus Terminal itself, hence the station name.

== Station layout ==
2nd floor	Side platform, the doors are opened on the right side
2nd floor	Line 1	← (Ciracas)	Cibubur Line to Harjamukti
2nd floor	Line 2		Cibubur Line to Dukuh Atas BNI	(TMII) →
2nd floor	Side platform, the doors are opened on the right side
1st floor	Concourse	Ticket counter, ticket vending machines, fare gates, retail kiosks
Ground level	Street	Entrance/Exit and access to Kampung Rambutan BRT Station and Bus Terminal

== Services ==
Cibubur Line

== Supporting transportation ==
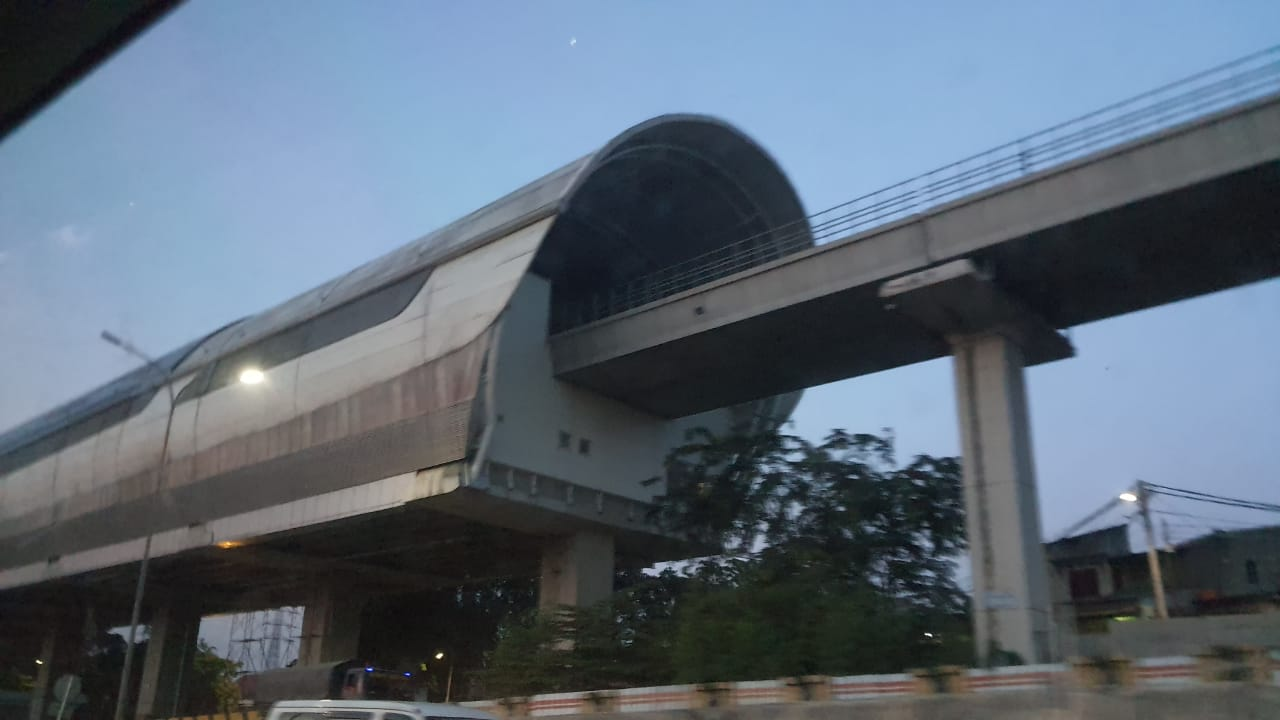
Kampung Rambutan LRT Station viewed from Jagorawi Toll Road, 2021

Type	Station	Route	Destination
Transjakarta	Kampung Rambutan (BRT Station)	List of TransJakarta corridors#Corridor 7	Kampung Rambutan-Kampung Melayu
Transjakarta	Kampung Rambutan (BRT Station)	List of TransJakarta corridors#Cross-corridor routes	Kampung Rambutan-Juanda via Cempaka Putih
Transjakarta	Kampung Rambutan (BRT Station)	List of TransJakarta corridors#Cross-corridor routes	Kampung Rambutan-Tanjung Priok
Transjakarta (Non-BRT)	Kampung Rambutan (BRT Station)		Kampung Rambutan-Blok M
Transjakarta (Non-BRT)	Kampung Rambutan (BRT Station)		Kampung Rambutan-Ciputat
Transjakarta (Non-BRT)	Kampung Rambutan Bus Terminal (Bus stop)		Kampung Rambutan-Lebak Bulus
Transjakarta (Non-BRT)	Kampung Rambutan Bus Terminal (Bus stop)		Kampung Rambutan-Ragunan
Mikrotrans	Kampung Rambutan Bus Terminal (Bus stop)	JAK.06	Kampung Rambutan-Pondok Gede
Mikrotrans	Kampung Rambutan Bus Terminal (Bus stop)	JAK.19	Kampung Rambutan-Pinang Ranti
Mikrotrans	Kampung Rambutan Bus Terminal (Bus stop)	JAK.25	Kampung Rambutan-Kalisari
Mikrotrans	Kampung Rambutan Bus Terminal (Bus stop)	JAK.28	Kampung Rambutan-Taman Wiladatika
Mikrotrans	Kampung Rambutan Bus Terminal (Bus stop)	JAK.38	Kampung Rambutan-Bulak Ringin
Mikrotrans	Kampung Rambutan Bus Terminal (Bus stop)	JAK.71	Kampung Rambutan-Pinang Ranti
Mikrotrans	Kampung Rambutan Bus Terminal (Bus stop)	JAK.72	Kampung Rambutan-Pasar Rebo
Mikrotrans	Kampung Rambutan Bus Terminal (Bus stop)	JAK.98	Kampung Rambutan-Munjul
