= Ciliwung LRT station =

Light rapid transit station in Indonesia

CB07 BK07 Ciliwung
- Ciliwung LRT Station seen from the Jakarta Inner Ring Road

General information
- Location: Jalan Letjen M.T. Haryono, Cawang, Kramat Jati, East Jakarta, Jakarta, Indonesia
- Coordinates: 6.243477°S 106.864131°E
- System: Jabodebek LRT station
- Owner: Ministry of Transportation via the Directorate General of Railways
- Manager: Kereta Api Indonesia
- Lines: Cibubur Line; Bekasi Line
- Platforms: 2 side platforms
- Tracks: 2
- Connections: Ciliwung

Construction
- Structure type: Elevated
- Cycle facilities: Bicycle parking
- Accessible: Yes

Other information
- Station code: CIL

History
- Opened: 28 August 2023
- Electrified: 2019

Services
Preceding station		Following station
Cikoko towards Dukuh Atas	Cibubur Line	Cawang towards Harjamukti
Cikoko towards Dukuh Atas	Bekasi Line	Cawang towards Jati Mulya
Route map
Location

Ciliwung LRT Station is a light rapid transit station located in Jalan Letjen M.T. Haryono, Cawang, Kramat Jati, East Jakarta, Indonesia. It is located at an altitude of +36.34 meters and serves the Cibubur and Bekasi lines of the Jabodebek LRT system. The station is named after the nearby Ciliwung River to the west.

== Station layout ==
2nd floor
Side platform, the doors are opened on the right side
Line 1
← (Cawang)
Cibubur Line to Harjamukti,

Bekasi Line to Jati Mulya

Line 2

Cibubur Line to Dukuh Atas BNI,

Bekasi Line to Dukuh Atas BNI

(Cikoko) →
Side platform, the doors are opened on the right side
1st floor
Concourse
Ticket counter, ticket vending machines, fare gates, retail kiosks
Ground level
Street
Entrance/Exit and access to Ciliwung BRT Station

== Services ==
- Cibubur Line
- Bekasi Line

== Supporting transportation ==
Type	Station	Route	Destination
Transjakarta	Ciliwung (BRT Station)	List of TransJakarta corridors#Corridor 9	Pinang Ranti–Pluit
Transjakarta	Ciliwung (BRT Station)	List of TransJakarta corridors#Cross-corridor routes	Cililitan–Grogol Reformasi
Transjakarta	Ciliwung (BRT Station)	List of TransJakarta corridors#Cross-corridor routes	Pinang Ranti–Bundaran Senayan
Transjakarta (Non-BRT)	Ciliwung (BRT Station)		TMII–Pancoran
Transjakarta (Non-BRT)	Ciliwung (BRT Station)		Cibubur Junction–Pluit

== Gallery ==
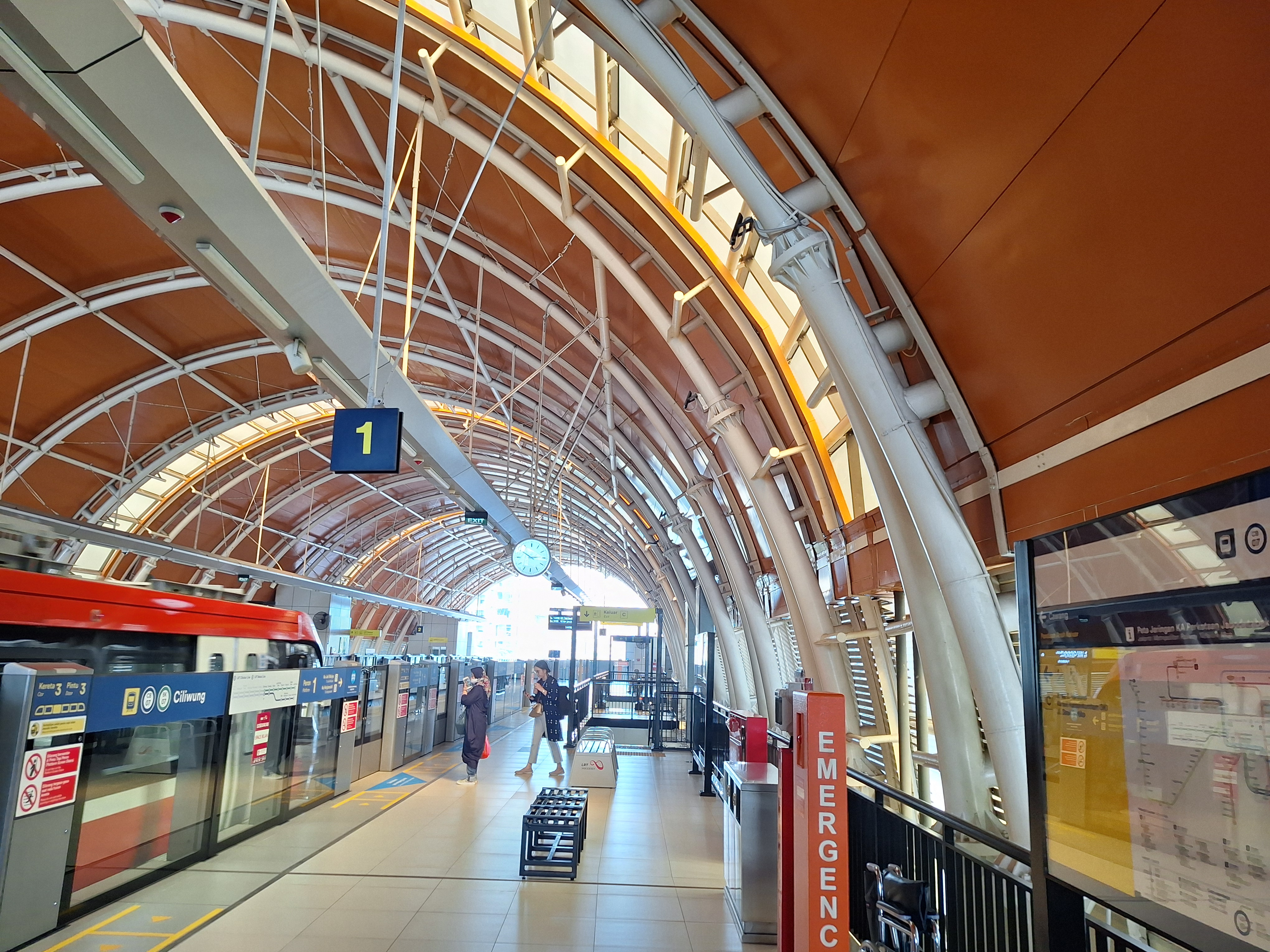
Ciliwung LRT Station rail yard, December 2023

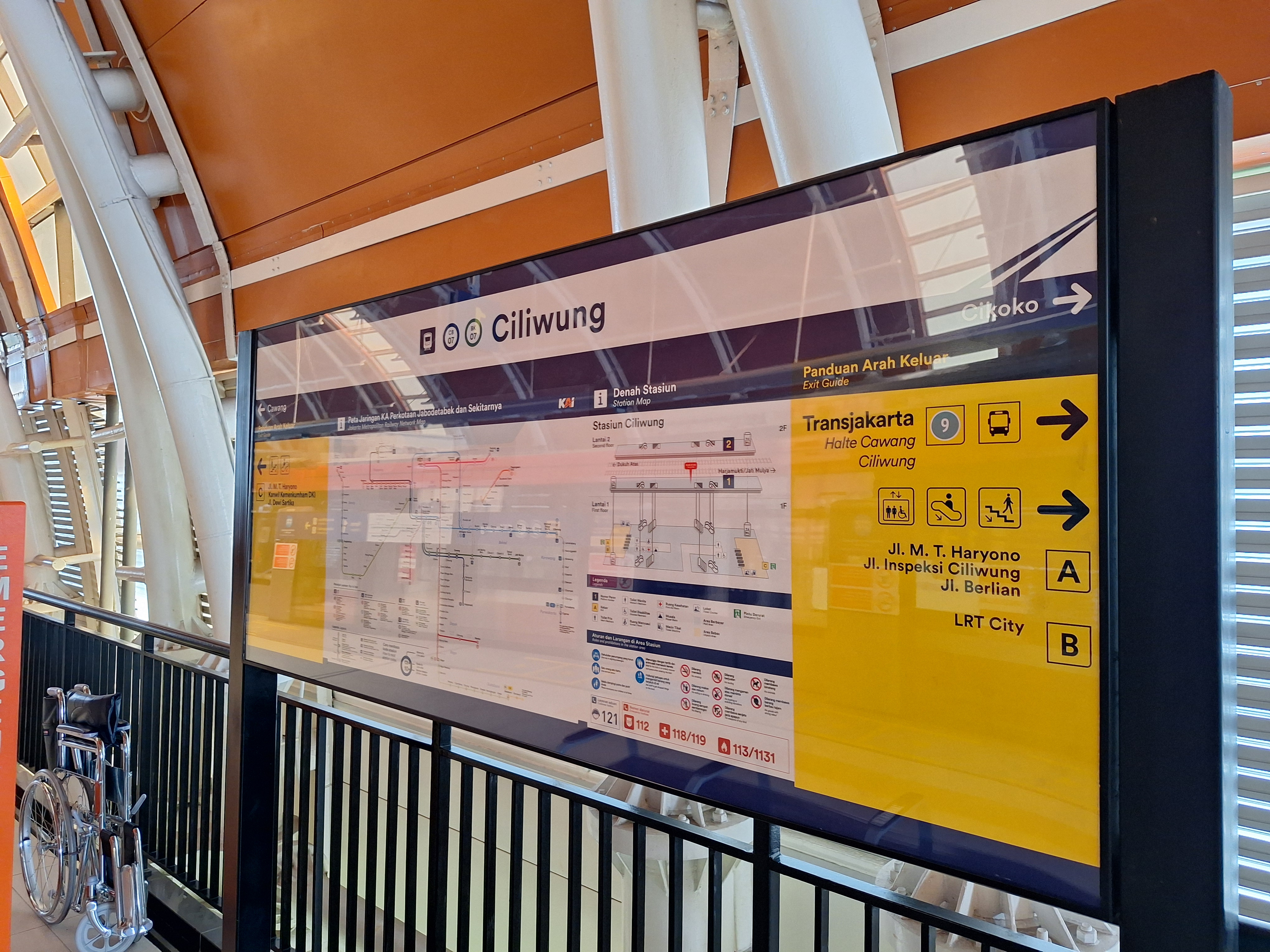
Public information board in Ciliwung LRT Station, December 2023

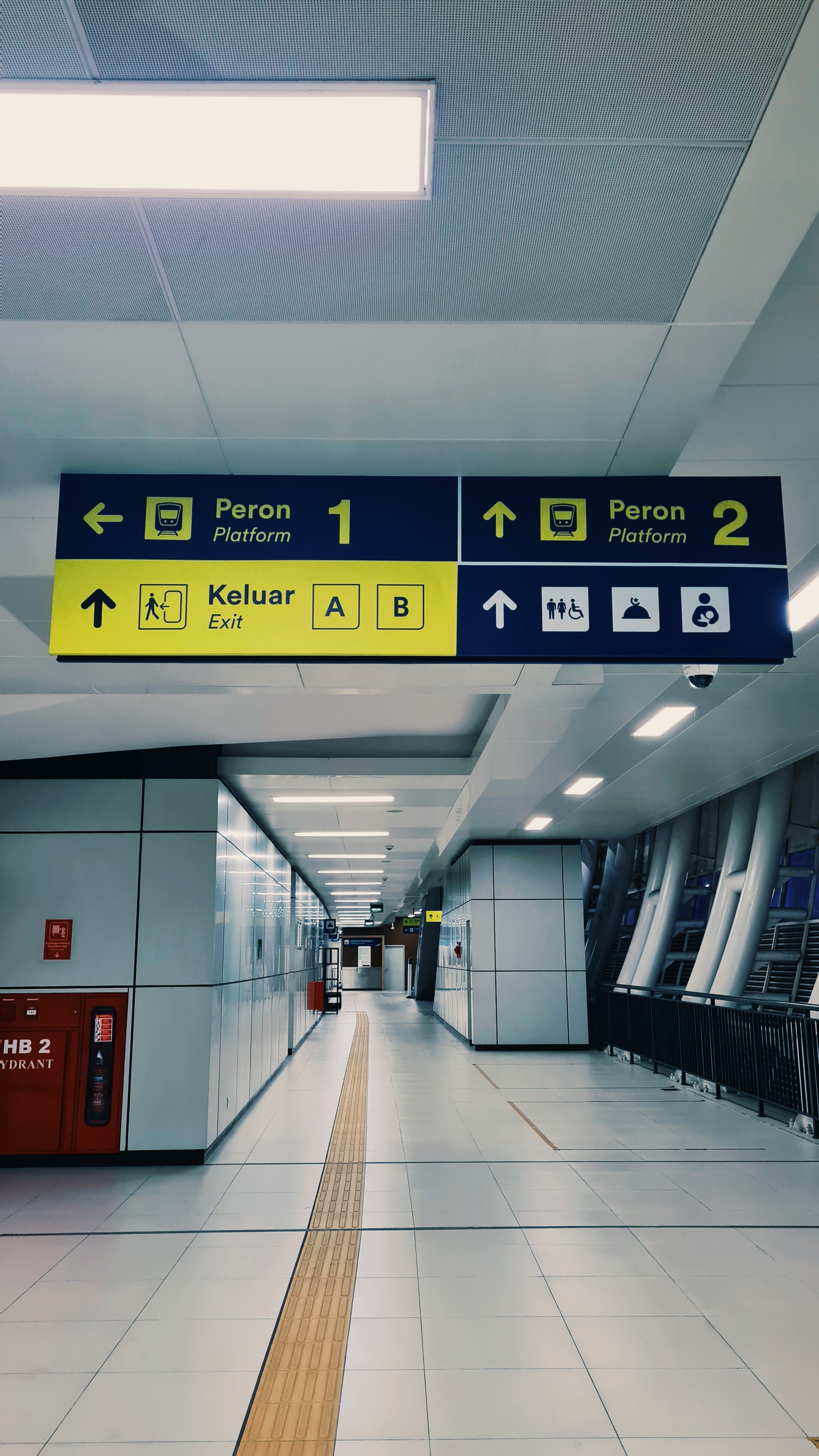
Wayfindings in station in March 2023
