= Ciracas LRT station =

Light rapid transit station in Indonesia

CB11 Ciracas
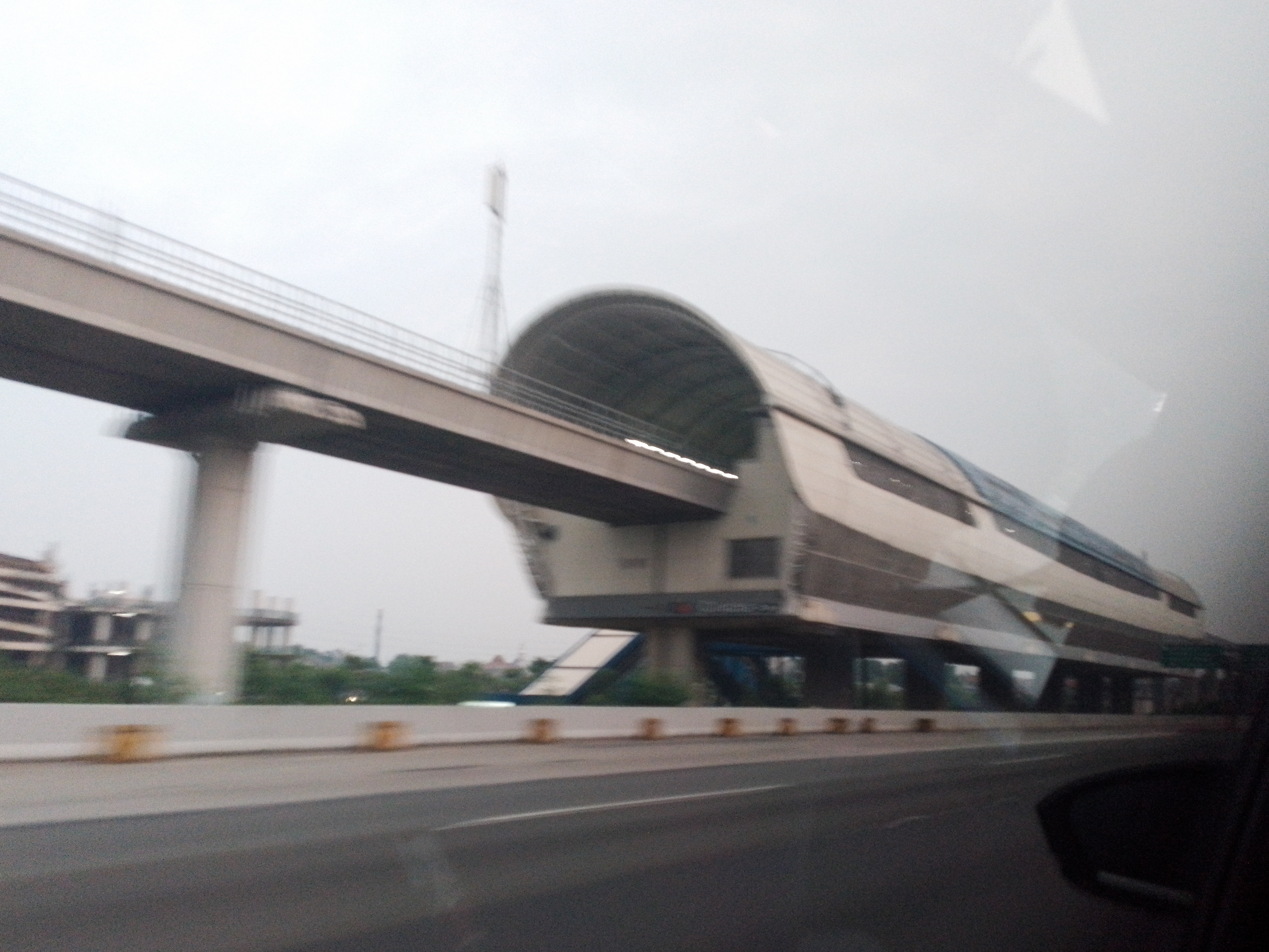
- The station seen from the Jagorawi Toll Road

General information
- Location: Jalan Cikago, Ciracas, Ciracas, East Jakarta, Jakarta, Indonesia
- Coordinates: 6.3237°S 106.8867°E
- System: Jabodebek LRT station
- Owner: Ministry of Transportation via the Directorate General of Railways
- Manager: Kereta Api Indonesia
- Line: Cibubur Line
- Platforms: 2 side platforms
- Tracks: 2

Construction
- Structure type: Elevated
- Cycle facilities: Bicycle parking
- Accessible: Yes

Other information
- Station code: CRC

History
- Opened: 28 August 2023
- Electrified: 2019

Services
Preceding station		Following station
Kampung Rambutan towards Dukuh Atas BNI	Cibubur Line	Harjamukti Terminus
Route map
Location

Ciracas LRT Station is a light rapid transit station located in Jalan Cikago, Ciracas, Ciracas, East Jakarta, Indonesia. The station serves the Cibubur line of the Jabodebek LRT system.

== Station layout ==
2nd floor	Side platform, the doors are opened on the right side
2nd floor	Line 1	← (Harjamukti)	Cibubur Line to Harjamukti
2nd floor	Line 2		Cibubur Line to Dukuh Atas BNI	(Kampung Rambutan) →
2nd floor	Side platform, the doors are opened on the right side
1st floor	Concourse	Ticket counter, ticket vending machines, fare gates, retail kiosks
Ground level	Street	Entrance/Exit

== Services ==
Cibubur Line

== Supporting transportation ==
Type	Route	Destination
Mikrotrans	JAK 72	Kampung Rambutan-Pasar Rebo
Mikrotrans	JAK 38	Kampung Rambutan-Bulak Ringin
