= Cawang LRT station =

Light rapid transit station in Jakarta, Indonesia

CB08 BK08 Cawang
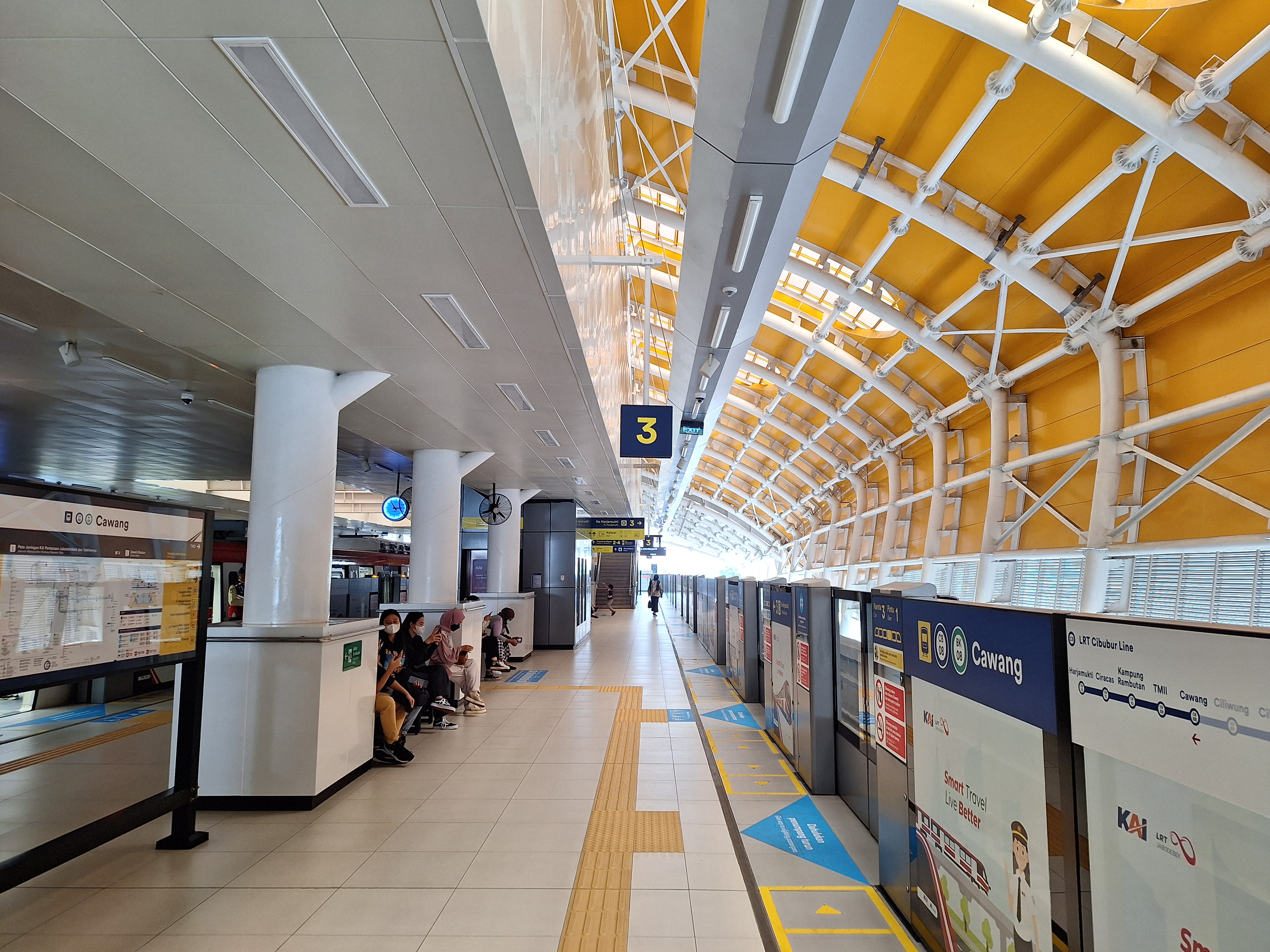
- Cawang LRT Station island platform 1 and 3 (eastwards), December 2023

General information
- Location: Jalan Letjen M.T. Haryono, Cawang, Kramat Jati, East Jakarta, Jakarta, Indonesia
- Coordinates: 6.246225°S 106.872386°E
- System: Jabodebek LRT station
- Owner: Ministry of Transportation via the Directorate General of Railways
- Manager: Kereta Api Indonesia
- Lines: Cibubur Line; Bekasi Line
- Platforms: 2 island platforms
- Tracks: 4
- Connections: Cawang

Construction
- Structure type: Elevated
- Cycle facilities: Bicycle parking
- Accessible: Yes

Other information
- Station code: CWG

History
- Opened: 28 August 2023
- Electrified: 2019

Services
| Preceding station | | Following station |
|---|---|---|
| Ciliwung towards Dukuh Atas BNI | Cibubur Line | TMII towards Harjamukti |
| Ciliwung towards Dukuh Atas BNI | Bekasi Line | Halim towards Jati Mulya |
Route map
Location

Cawang LRT Station is a light rapid transit station located in Jalan Letjen M.T. Haryono, Cawang, Kramat Jati, East Jakarta. The station, which is located at an altitude of +39 meters, serves the Cibubur and Bekasi lines of the Jabodebek LRT system. It is the main interchange station between the two lines of the system where the two lines meet and split. Despite sharing the same name, this station is not to be confused with the unrelated Cawang railway station served by the KRL Commuterline on the Bogor Line. Instead, Cawang KRL station is interchanged by the Cikoko LRT station.

== Station layout ==
Cawang LRT station is the only station in the system with two island platforms instead of two side platforms, hence the only one with four tracks.

| 3rd floor (mezzanine) | Concourse | Crossing area between platforms and retail kiosks |
| 2nd floor | Line 3 | ← (TMII) | Cibubur Line to Harjamukti |
| 2nd floor | Island platform, the doors are opened on the right or left side |
| 2nd floor | Line 1 | ← (Halim) | Bekasi Line to Jati Mulya |
| 2nd floor | Line 2 | | Bekasi Line to Dukuh Atas BNI | (Ciliwung) → |
| 2nd floor | Island platform, the doors are opened on the right or left side |
| 2nd floor | Line 4 | | Cibubur Line to Dukuh Atas BNI | (Ciliwung) → |
| 1st floor | Concourse | Ticket counter, ticket vending machines, fare gates, retail kiosks |
| Ground level | Street | Entrance/Exit and access to Cawang BRT Station |

== Services ==
- Cibubur Line
- Bekasi Line

== Supporting transportation ==
| Type | Station | Route | Destination |
|---|---|---|---|
| Transjakarta | Cawang (BRT Station) | List of Transjakarta corridors#Cross-corridor routes | Cililitan–Juanda |
| Transjakarta | Cawang (BRT Station) | List of TransJakarta corridors#Corridor 7 | Kampung Rambutan–Kampung Melayu |
| Transjakarta | Cawang (BRT Station) | List of TransJakarta corridors#Corridor 9 | Pinang Ranti–Pluit |
| Transjakarta | Cawang (BRT Station) | List of TransJakarta corridors#Cross-corridor routes | Cililitan–Grogol Reformasi |
| Transjakarta | Cawang (BRT Station) | List of TransJakarta corridors#Cross-corridor routes | Pinang Ranti–Bundaran Senayan |
| Transjakarta | Cawang (BRT Station) | List of TransJakarta corridors#Cross-corridor routes | Pinang Ranti–Simpang Cawang |
| Transjakarta (Non-BRT) | Cawang (BRT Station) | | Tebet Station–Bidara Cina |
| Transjakarta (Non-BRT) | Cawang (BRT Station) | | TMII–Pancoran |
| Transjakarta (Non-BRT) | Cawang (BRT Station) | | Cibubur Junction–Pluit |
| Transjakarta (Non-BRT) | Cawang (BRT Station) | | Cibubur Junction–Ancol |
| Transjakarta (Non-BRT) | Cawang (Bus stop) | | Cawang–Halim railway station |
| Transjakarta (Non-BRT) | Cawang (Bus stop) | | Cawang LRT station–Summarecon Mal Bekasi |
| Transjakarta (Non-BRT) | Cawang (Bus stop) | | Cawang LRT station– Bekasi Timur |

== Gallery ==
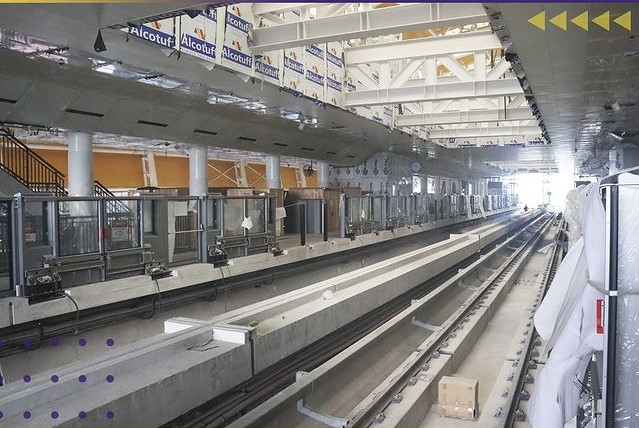
Cawang LRT Station under construction

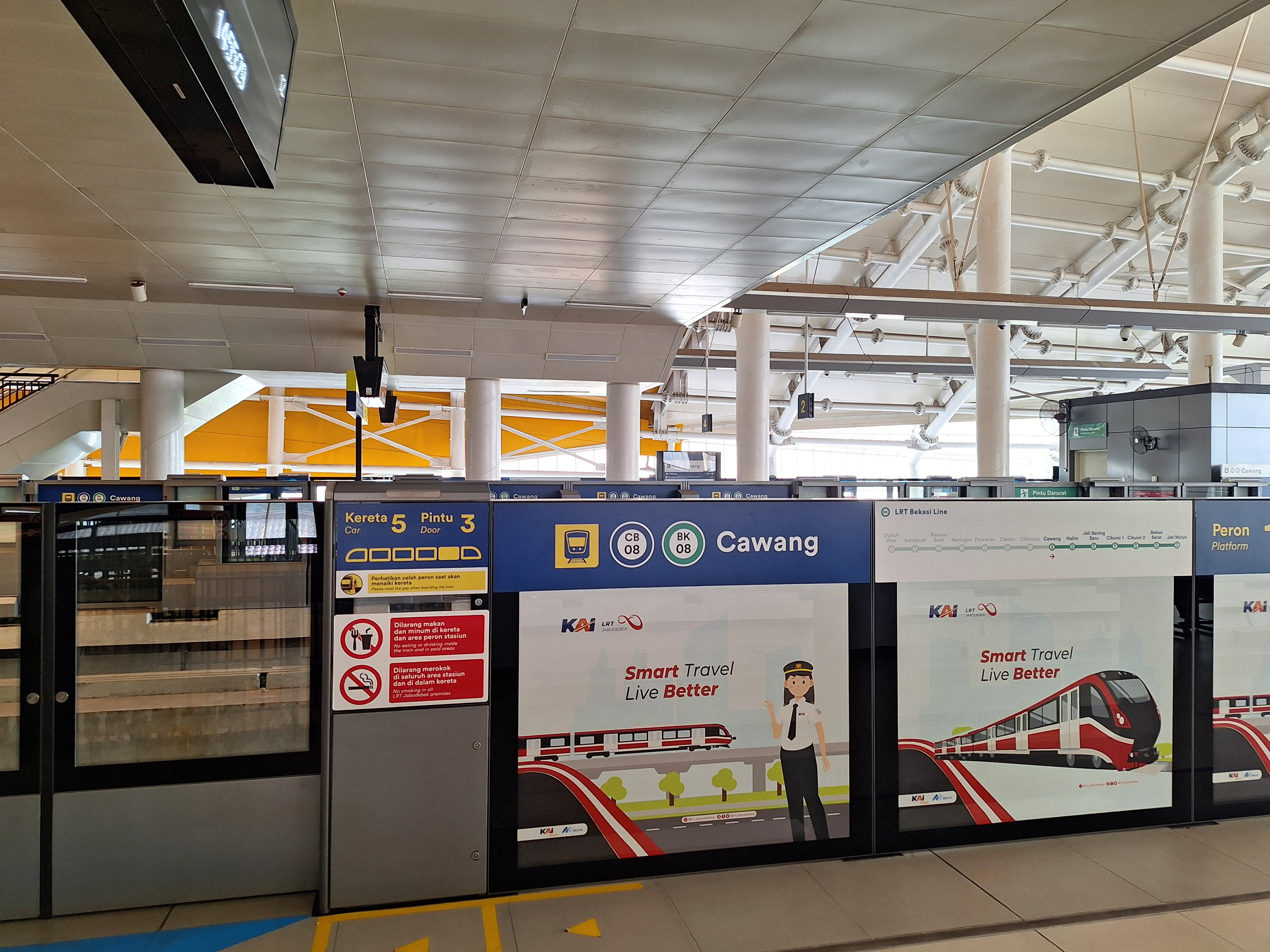
Cawang LRT Station name, December 2023

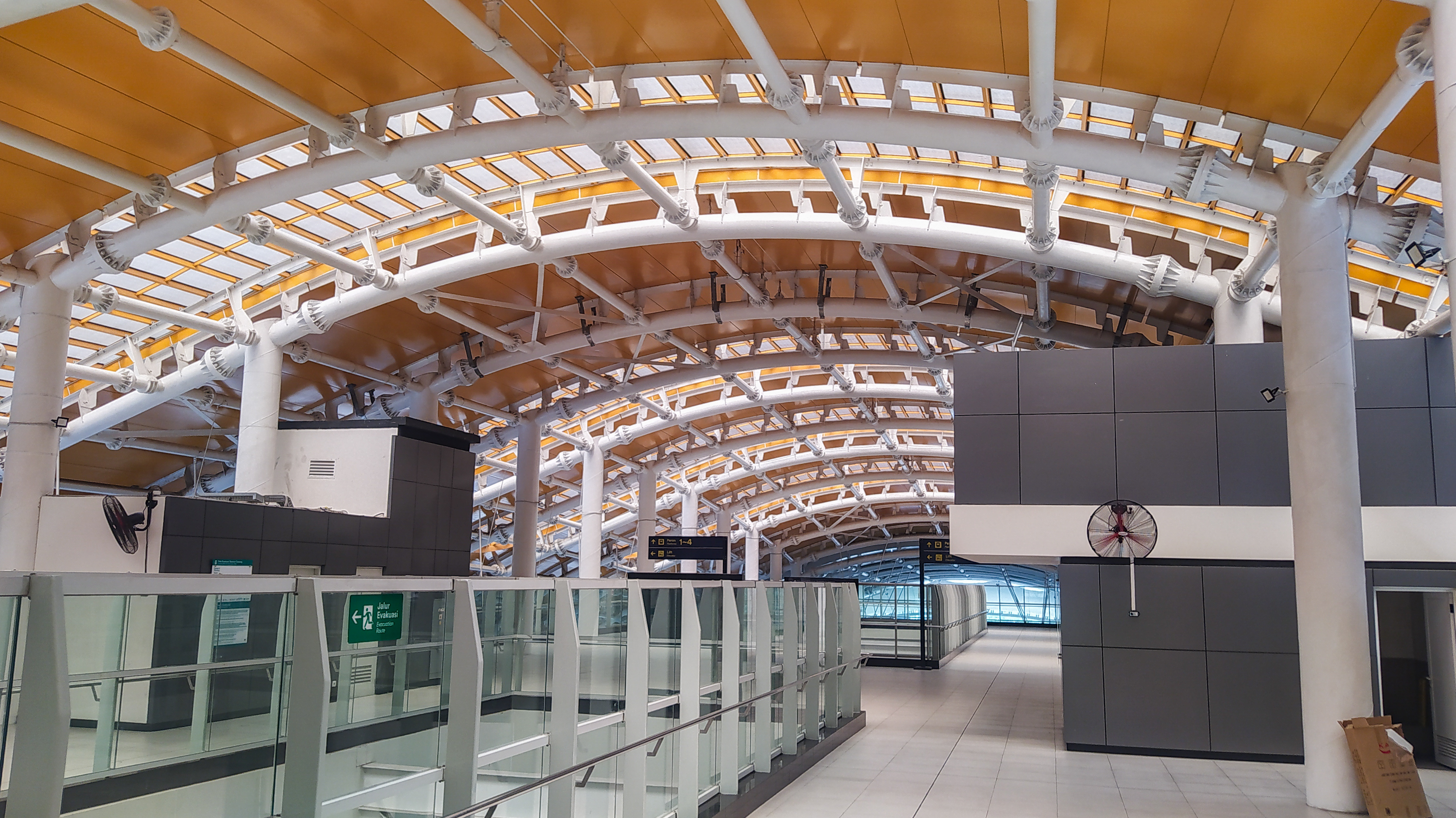
The upper floor area

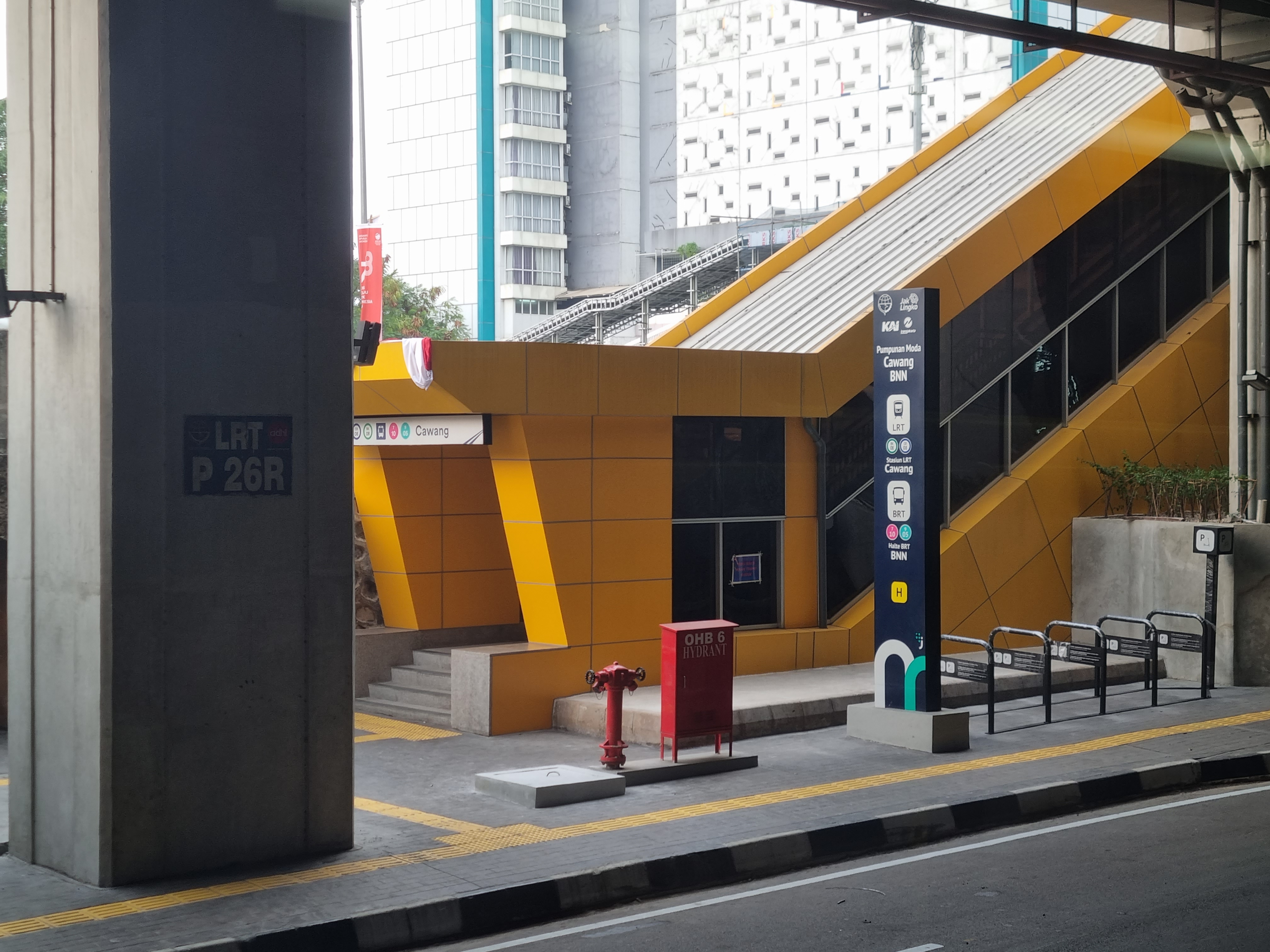
The north entrance to the station

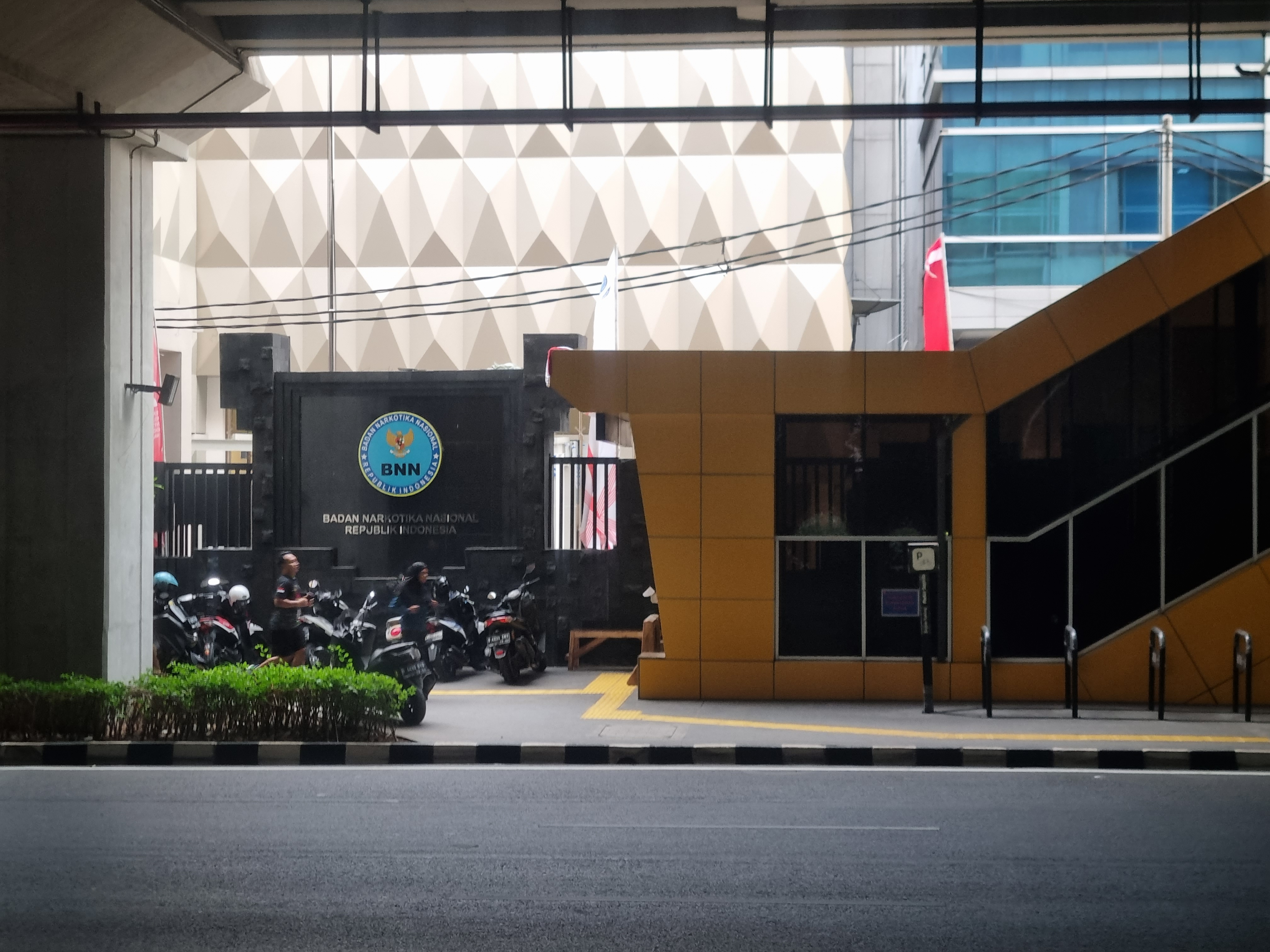
The south entrance adjacent with the National Narcotics Board headquarters
