= State Elementary School Cipinang Melayu 04 Pagi =

SD Negeri Cipinang Melayu 04 Pagi
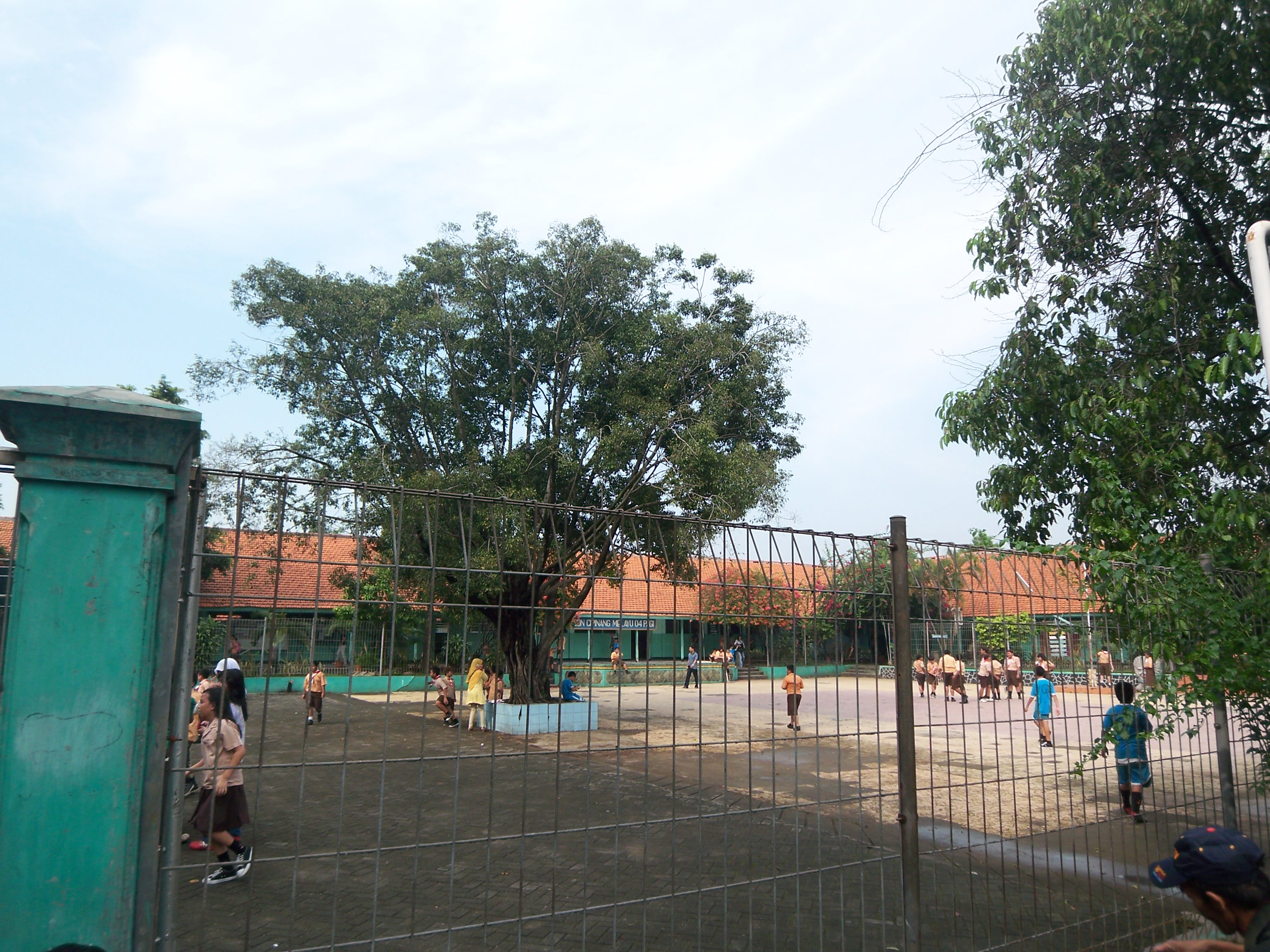

Location
- Jakarta; Indonesia
- Coordinates: 6°15′06″S 106°55′02″E

Information
- Type: Public
- Principal Vice Principal Deputy Headmaster: Siti Subarti, MMPd.
- Enrollment: 630

State Elementary School Cipinang Melayu 04 Pagi (Indonesian: Sekolah Dasar Negeri (SDN) Cipinang Melayu 04 Pagi) is an Indonesian public school in jalan Kartika Eka Paksi, RT.010 RW 06, KPAD Jatiwaringin, Kelurahan Cipinang Melayu, Kecamatan Makasar, Jakarta Timur, Jakarta, Indonesia.

== History ==
This school is sharing the same main gate into the area.

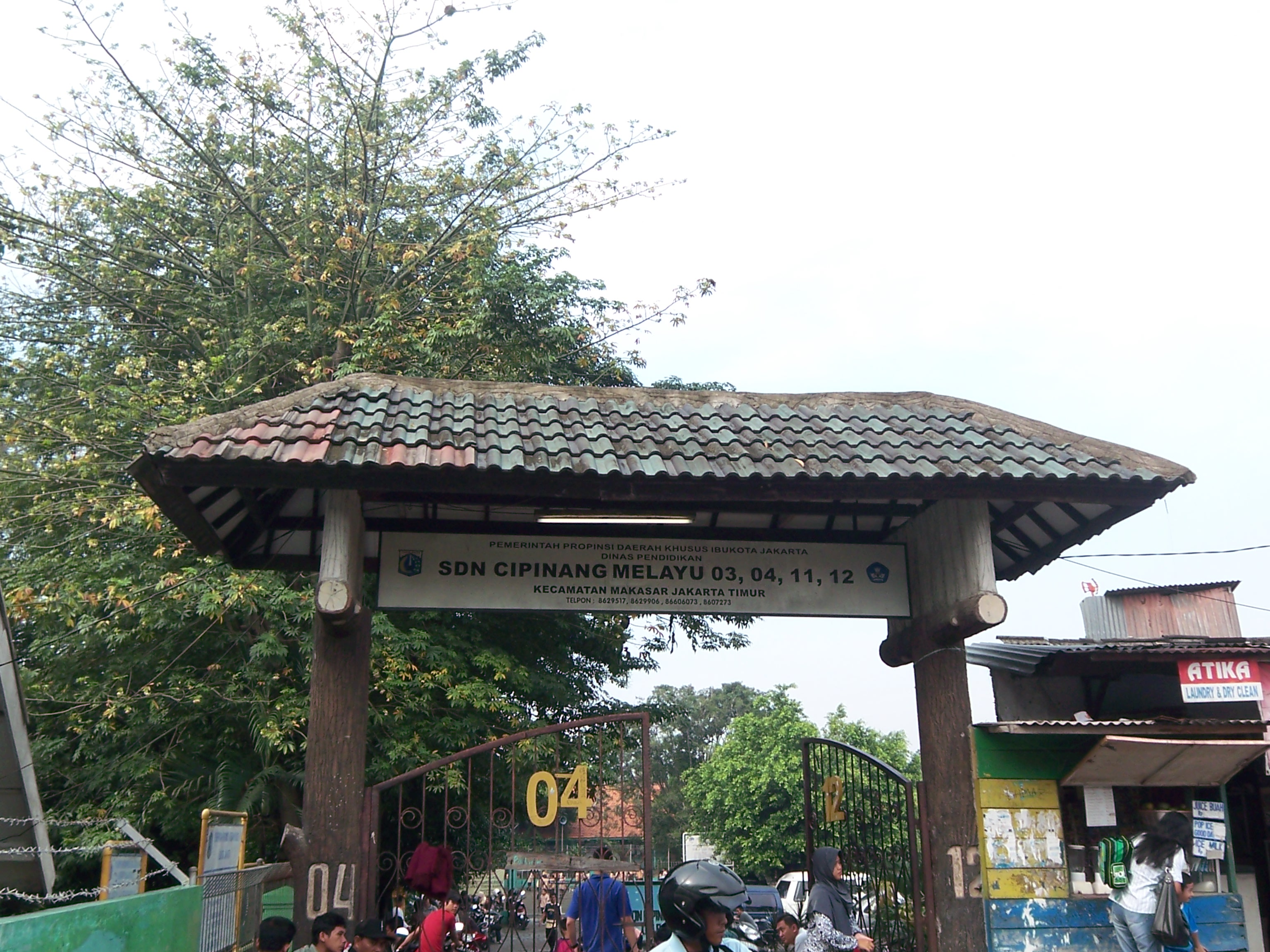
The sharing main entrance into State Elementary School 03 Pagi, 11 Petang, 04 Pagi and 12 Petang

Other schools within the area are:

- State Elementary School Cipinang Melayu 03 Pagi
- State Elementary School Cipinang Melayu 11 Petang
- State Elementary School Cipinang Melayu 12 Petang
- SMAN 81 Jakarta
