= State Elementary School Cipinang Melayu 11 Petang =

SD Negeri Cipinang Melayu 11 Petang
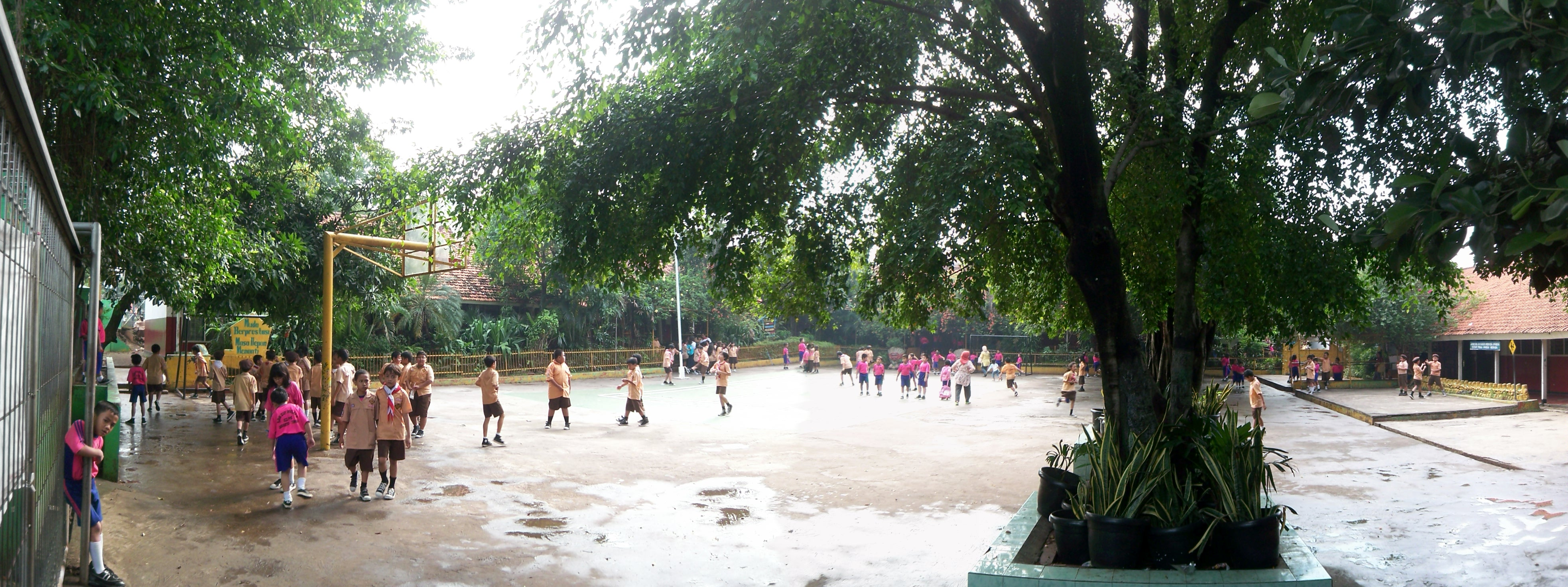

Location
- Jakarta; Indonesia
- Coordinates: 6°15′05″S 106°55′04″E

Information
- Type: Public
- Established: 1980
- Enrollment: 330

'State Elementary School Cipinang Melayu 11 Petang (Indonesian: Sekolah Dasar Negeri (SDN) Cipinang Melayu 11 Petang) is an Indonesian public school in jalan Kartika Eka Paksi, RT.010 RW 06, KPAD Jatiwaringin, Kelurahan Cipinang Melayu, Kecamatan Makasar, Jakarta Timur, Jakarta, Indonesia.

== History ==
The school was founded in 1980 as public school by the DKI Jakarta government with an area of 6.800 m^{2} and started to be used in 1982/1983. The school identity is Indonesian: Identitas Nomor Statistik Sekolah : 10.13.16.40.81.03 and Indonesian: Nomor Identitas Sekoah : 100030

Another school within the area are:

- State Elementary School Cipinang Melayu 04 Pagi
- State Elementary School Cipinang Melayu 03 Pagi
- State Elementary School Cipinang Melayu 12 Petang dan
- SMAN 81 Jakarta
