= Cibubur Line =

Light rapid transit line in Indonesia

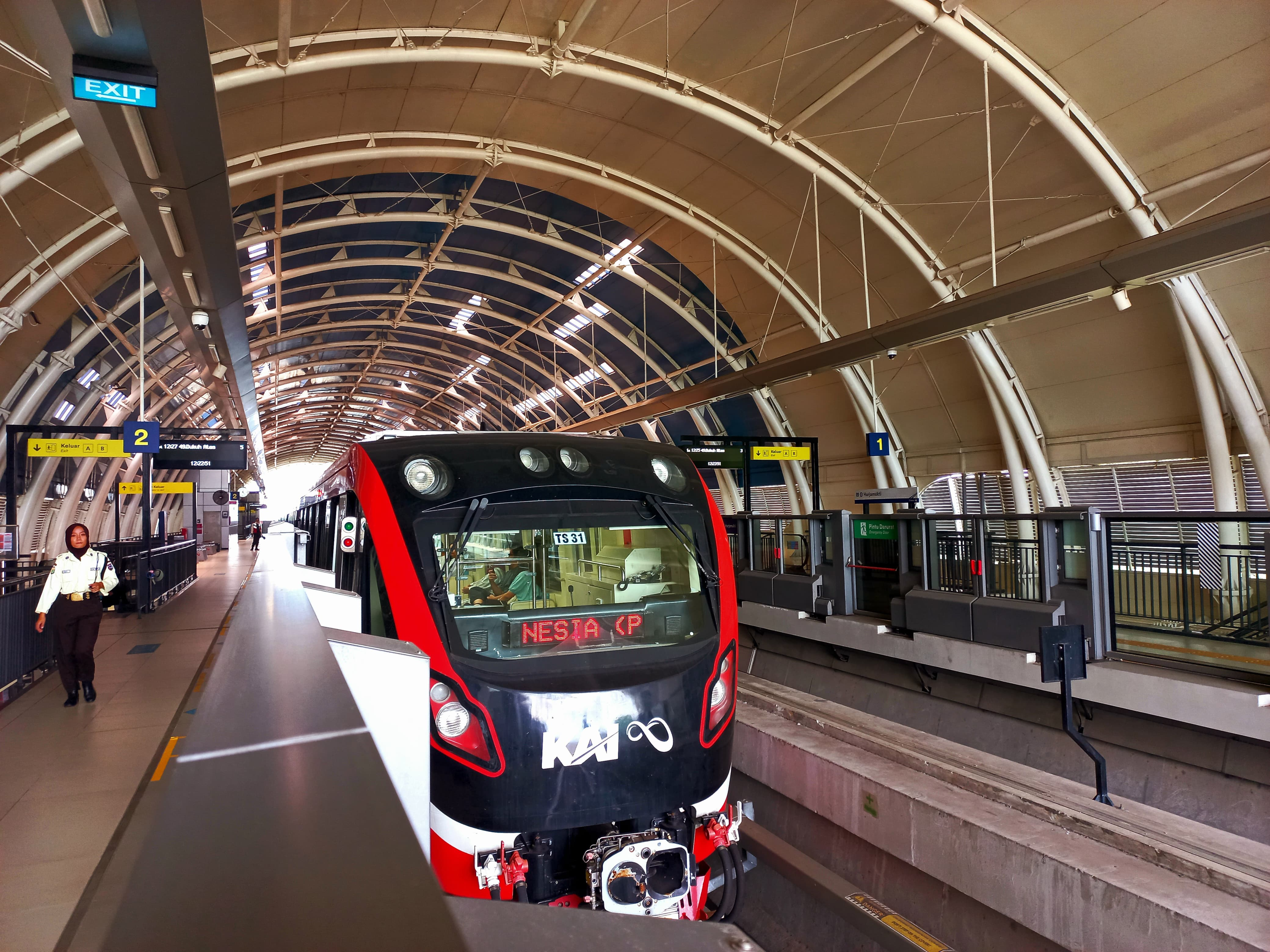
- One of the trainsets at Harjamukti Station

Overview
- Other name: Service line 1 of LRT Jabodebek (working name)
- Native name: Lin Cibubur
- Status: Operational
- Owner: Ministry of Transportation
- Locale: Jakarta, West Java
- Termini: Dukuh Atas BNI; Harjamukti; Baranangsiang (phase 2); Senayan (phase 3)
- Stations: 19 (12 operational, 7 planned)

Service
- Type: Light rapid transit
- System: Jabodebek LRT
- Services: 1
- Operator: Kereta Api Indonesia
- Depot: Jatimulya

History
- Opened: 28 August 2023; 2 years ago
- Completed: 2022

Technical
- Line length: 25.94 km (16.12 mi)
- Number of tracks: 2
- Character: Elevated
- Track gauge: 1,435 mm (4 ft 8 1/2 in) standard gauge
- Electrification: 750 V DC from third rail

The Jabodebek LRT Cibubur Line (Indonesian: LRT Jabodebek Lin Cibubur) is one of the two light rapid lines of the Jabodebek LRT which connect Dukuh Atas BNI to Harjamukti station, which is about 25.94 km in length. The line adopts elevated construction and stops at twelve stations.

Its Pancoran–Harjamukti section runs along the Jakarta Inner Ring Road and Jagorawi Toll Road. The planned next phase would extend the line to Bogor.

== History ==
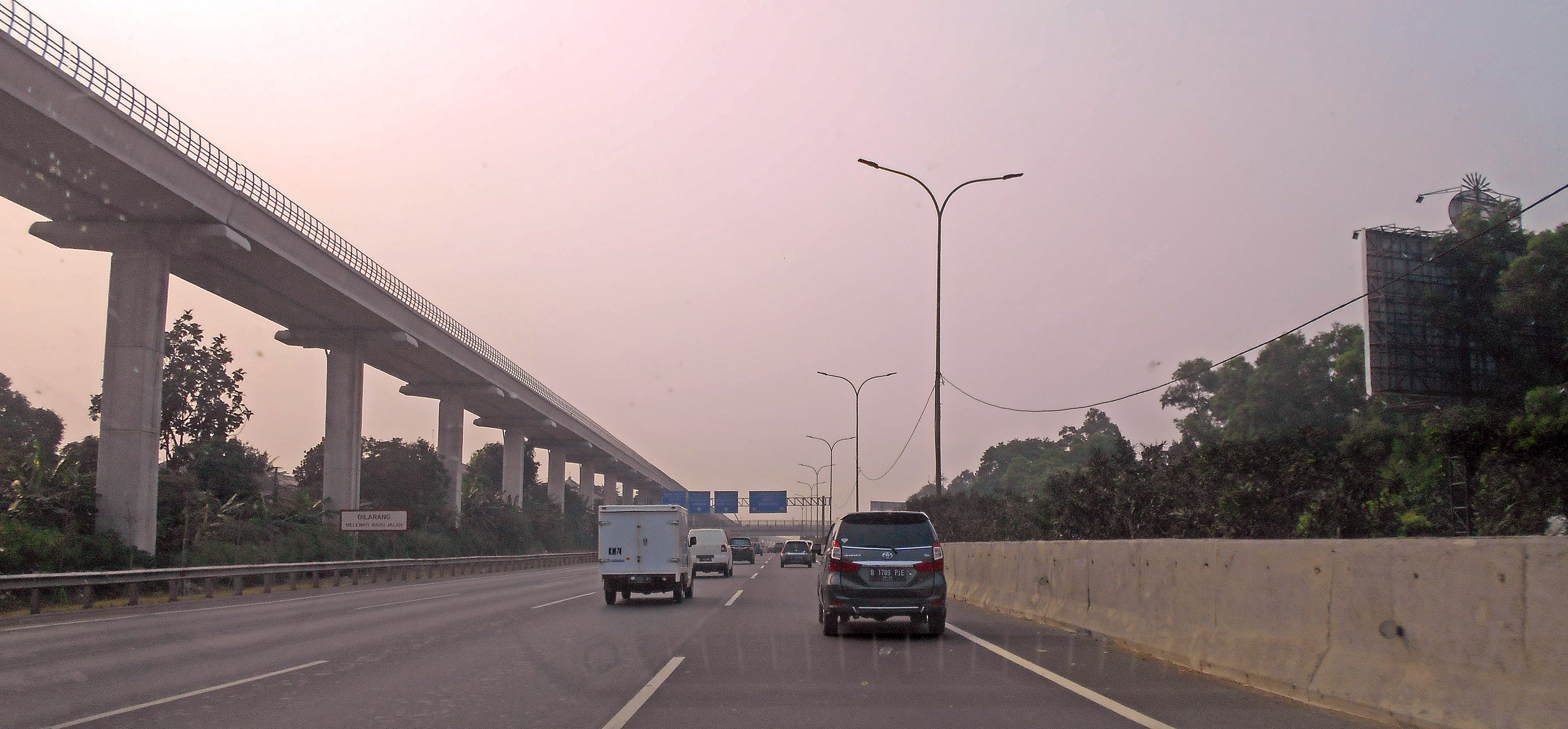
The elevated route is built parallel with the Jagorawi Toll Road.

Like other public transportation systems in Jabodetabek area, the Jabodebek LRT system was built to break down congestion. The construction of the Cawang–Cibubur LRT Line and other lines in the first phase of the Jabodebek LRT construction began with the groundbreaking on 9 September 2015 by President Joko Widodo. It was carried out near the planned TMII Station which is a part of this route.

Initially the phase 1 was targeted to be completed before the 2018 Asian Games. However, until the Asian Games were held, the overall progress was still 45%. Even so, at the time the Cawang–Cibubur route had already begun to be installed with rails.

In March 2019, the entire track has been connected. All elevated construction work has been completed and continued with signaling and station construction. Therefore, the line is estimated to be ready for the trial run considering that the other lines have not yet completed their track construction.

On 11 October 2019, the first train of Jabodebek LRT arrived in Jakarta. The shipment was carried out by land directly from INKA factory in Madiun, East Java. For the time being, the train has been parked near Harjamukti Station; considering that the LRT depot construction in Jatimulya, Bekasi has not yet been completed.

In October 2020, the Jabodebek LRT trains began their trials. The trial was carried out on the Cawang–Cibubur route from TMII Station to Harjamukti Station. It was conducted to check signal and track readiness.

== Network ==
=== Route ===
The Cibubur Line has a track length of 25.94 kilometers. Most of the trajectory of this route is using an elevated structure. From Dukuh Atas BNI to Cawang, this line shares the route with Bekasi Line, goes along Jalan Rasuna Said then turns to the south side of the Jakarta Inner Ring Road (Cawang–Pluit section). In Cawang Station, the two lines split and the line follows the Jagorawi Toll Road alignment. In a section from Cawang Station to TMII Station, the route follows the east side of the toll road; tracks are made at grade because it is close to the approach zone of Halim Perdanakusuma Airport. After TMII Station, the route moves to the west side until its terminus at Harjamukti Station. The track ends at Harjamukti as a pit stop, although all trains of the system have their depot in Jatimulya, part of the Bekasi Line.

=== List of stations ===
Station		Transfer/Notes		Location	
Number	Name	Transfer/Notes		City/Regency	Province
Phase 1: Cibubur–Dukuh Atas
CB01 BK01	Dukuh Atas Bank Syariah Indonesia	LRT Line 3 (Greater Jakarta LRT)	Terminus station. Dukuh Atas BNI Sudirman BNI City Dukuh Atas (Planned) Dukuh Atas Galunggung	South Jakarta	Jakarta
CB02 BK02	Setiabudi	LRT Line 3 (Greater Jakarta LRT)	Setiabudi Integritas	South Jakarta	Jakarta
CB03 BK03	Rasuna Said	LRT Line 3 (Greater Jakarta LRT)	Rasuna Said	South Jakarta	Jakarta
CB04 BK04	Kuningan	LRT Line 3 (Greater Jakarta LRT)	Kuningan (PT) Kuningan (Planned)	South Jakarta	Jakarta
CB05 BK05	Pancoran	LRT Line 3 (Greater Jakarta LRT)	Pancoran	South Jakarta	Jakarta
CB06 BK06	Cikoko	LRT Line 3 (Greater Jakarta LRT)	Cawang Cikoko	South Jakarta	Jakarta
CB07 BK07	Ciliwung	LRT Line 3 (Greater Jakarta LRT)	Ciliwung	East Jakarta	Jakarta
CB08 BK08	Cawang	LRT Line 3 (Greater Jakarta LRT)	Interchange station to Cawang	East Jakarta	Jakarta
CB09	TMII		Makasar Shuttle bus to Taman Mini Indonesia Indah.	East Jakarta	Jakarta
CB10	Kampung Rambutan		Kampung Rambutan Kampung Rambutan Bus Terminal. Kampung Rambutan (planned)	East Jakarta	Jakarta
CB11	Ciracas			East Jakarta	Jakarta
CB12	Harjamukti		Terminus station (phase 1). F01 F02 Stasiun LRT Harjamukti K1 Stasiun LRT Harjamukti (DC) Harjamukti (planned)	Depok	West Java
Phase 2: Cibubur–Bogor (under feasibility study)
	Bojong Nangka			Depok	West Java
	Gunung Putri			Bogor Regency	West Java
	Sirkuit Internasional Sentul			Bogor Regency	West Java
	Sentul			Bogor Regency	West Java
	Sukaraja		(BG) Sukaraja (Planned)	Bogor	West Java
	Bogor		(BG) Baranangsiang (Planned)	Bogor	West Java

== Future development ==
In the phase 2 plan, the Cibubur Line is to be extended to Bogor and Senayan. The Cibubur-Bogor route is planned to be built at grade, instead of elevated like the Cawang–Cibubur route. This aims to save construction costs by up to 50%. Until recently, it is still in the design planning process.

== Incidents ==
- On 25 October 2021, two LRT trains had an accident while undergoing trials on Cibubur Line, parallel to the Jagorawi Toll Road.
