= Cibubur =

- Urban village
- Map of Ciracas district, and Cibubur within it

- Location in Java
- Coordinates: 6°21′25″S 106°52′55″E
- Country: Indonesia
- Province: DKI Jakarta
- Administrative city: East Jakarta
- District: Ciracas

Government
  - Lurah (Village Head): Agus Pramono, S.E

Area
  - Total: 4.50 km^{2} (1.74 sq mi)
- Elevation: 75 m (246 ft)
- Highest elevation: 91 m (299 ft)
- Lowest elevation: 54 m (177 ft)

Population (2017)
  - Total: 74,412
  - Density: 16,536/km^{2} (42,830/sq mi)
- Time zone: +7

Cibubur is one of the five administrative villages (kelurahan) in Ciracas district (kecamatan) in East Jakarta, Jakarta, the capital of Indonesia. Cibubur is located in a strategic location, situated in between Jalan Raya Bogor and the Jonggol area. Cibubur is the site of an SOS Children's Village.

== Recreational Places ==
- Bumi Perkemahan dan Graha Wisata Pramuka (Buperta), a national Scouting center composed of camping grounds and other various recreational sites intended for activities ranging from elementary school level to nationwide Jamborees.
- Hutan Kota Cibubur
- Taman Bunga Widya Mandala Krida Bakti (Wiladatika), an interesting destination, perfect for family gatherings and recreational activities from swimming, Football, and other kinds of sports. It is also often visited by filmmakers to shoot movie scenes.
- Telaga Arwana, a fun family spot with a lot of activities from educational activities, Swimming Pool, and a fishing spot that occasionally held tournaments to catch Arwana Fish.
