= Cama =

Cama may refer to:

- Cama, a Parsi name
- Cama (animal), a cross between a camel and a llama
- Cama, Switzerland, a municipality in the Graubünden
- Cama Hospital in Mumbai, India
- Cama (surname)

CAMA is an abbreviation for:

- California-Arizona Maneuver Area, formerly known as the Desert Training Center, or DTC
- Centralized Automatic Message Accounting
- Christian and Missionary Alliance, an Evangelical Protestant denomination
- Community Arts Music Association, Santa Barbara, California
- Computer-Assisted Mass Appraisal, software used to establish real estate appraisals for property tax calculations

== See also ==
- Camael
- Kama (disambiguation)
- Karma (disambiguation)
- Khama (disambiguation)
