= State Elementary School Cipinang Melayu 12 Petang =

SD Negeri Cipinang Melayu 12 Petang
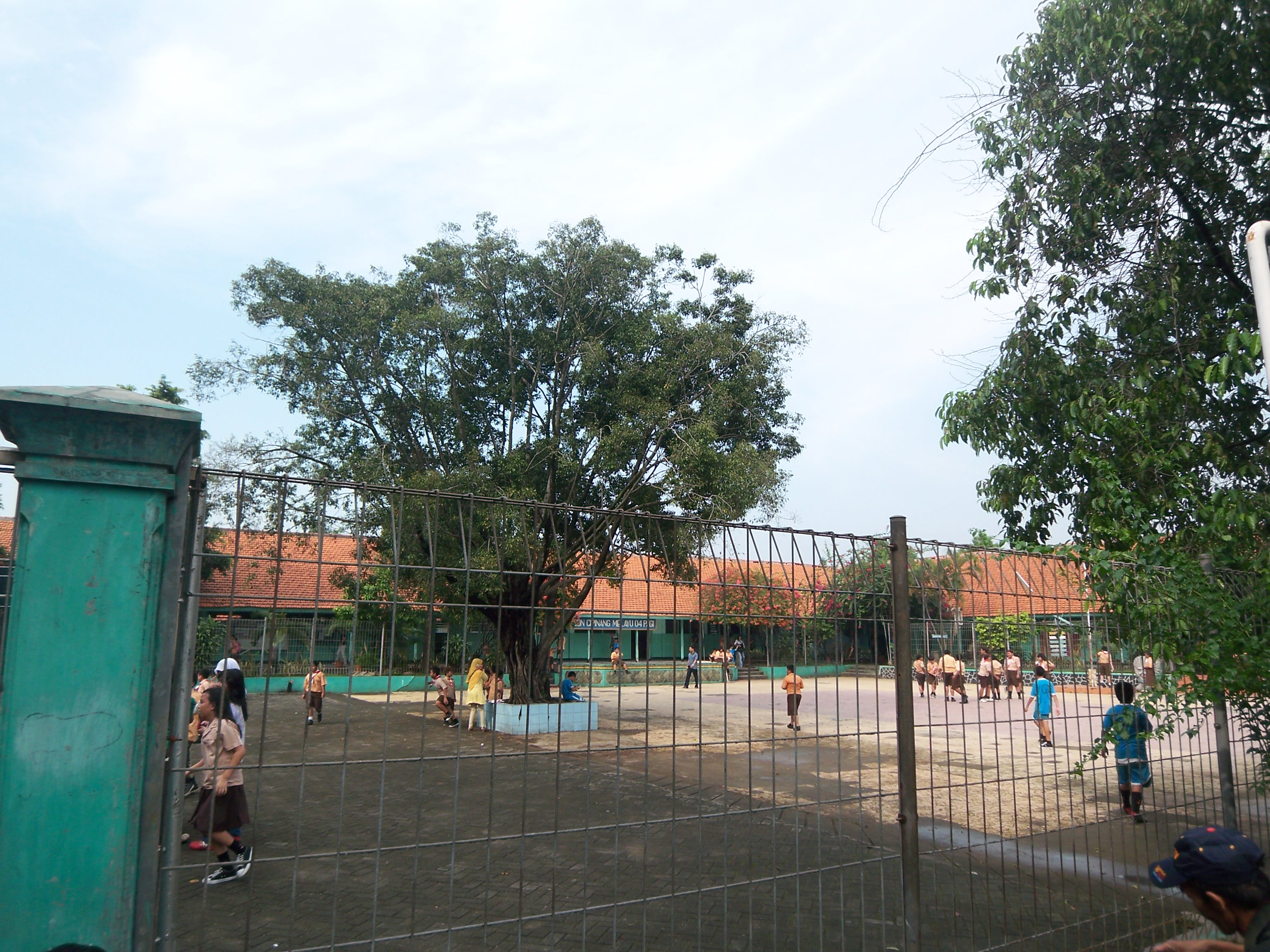

Location
- Jakarta; Indonesia
- Coordinates: 6°15′06″S 106°55′02″E

Information
- Type: Public
- Principal Vice Principal Deputy Headmaster: Hj. Retno Hariatiningsih.
- Enrollment: 421

State Elementary School Cipinang Melayu 12 Petang (Indonesian: Sekolah Dasar Negeri (SDN) Cipinang Melayu 12 Petang) is an Indonesian public school in jalan Kartika Eka Paksi, RT.010 RW 06, KPAD Jatiwaringin, Kelurahan Cipinang Melayu, Kecamatan Makasar, Jakarta Timur, Jakarta, Indonesia.

== History ==
This school is sharing the same main gate into the area.

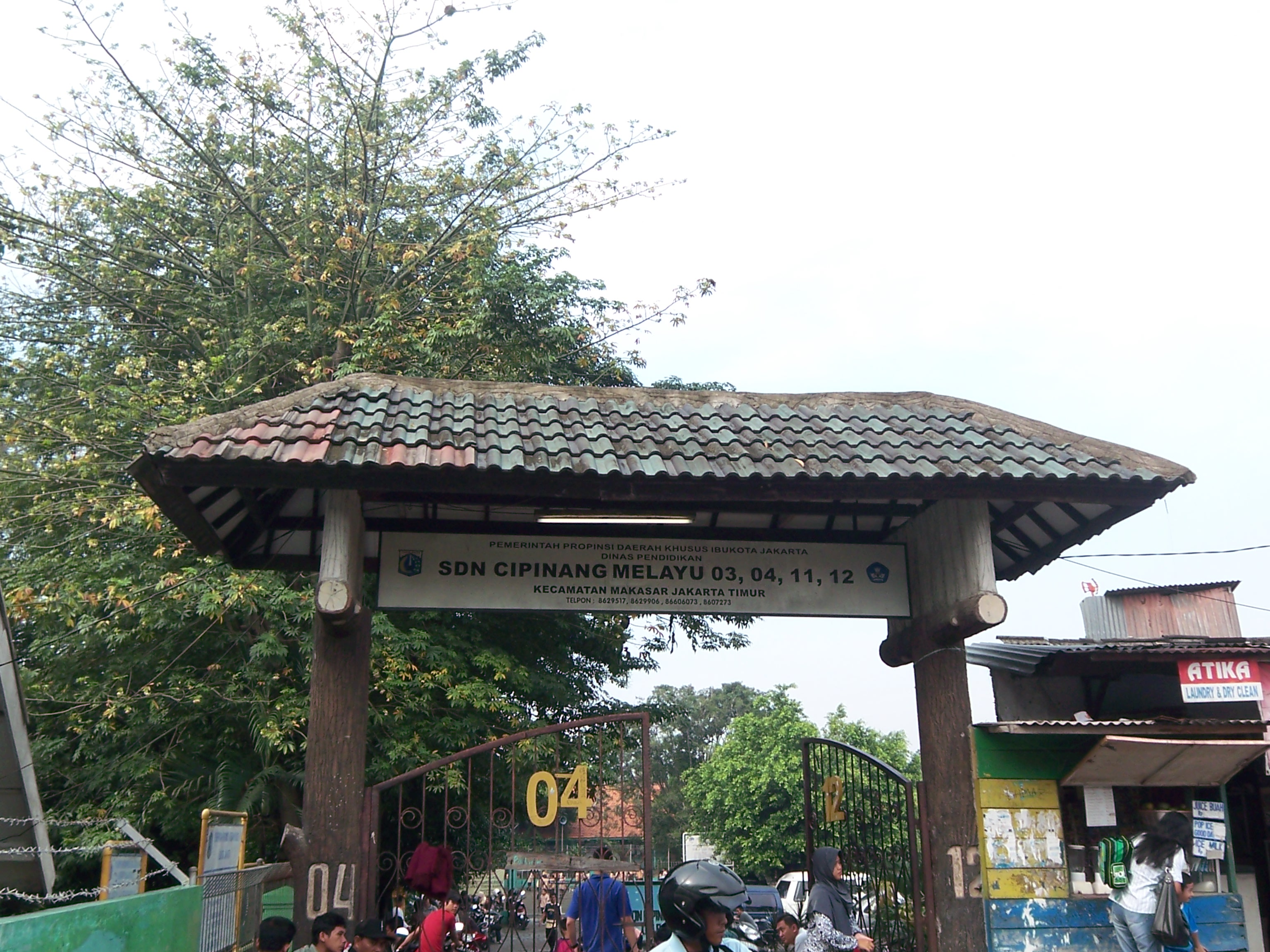
The sharing main entrance into State Elementary School 03 Pagi, 11 Petang, 04 Pagi and 12 Petang

Another school within the area are:

- State Elementary School Cipinang Melayu 03 Pagi
- State Elementary School Cipinang Melayu 11 Petang
- State Elementary School Cipinang Melayu 04 Pagi and
- SMAN 81 Jakarta
