= Kamas =

Kamas may mean

- Kamas, Utah
- Kamas (raga), a ragam in Carnatic music
- KAMAS (program), an acronym for Knowledge and Mind Amplification System, an outline processor
- Kamasins, a Samoyedic people
- Kamassian language, an extinct Samoyedic language spoken by the Kamasins before the 20th century
- Kamas, a Japanese sickle and weapon.

== See also ==
- Kama
- Kama (disambiguation)
