= Kama (disambiguation) =

Kama is a concept translated from Sanskrit as pleasure, sensual gratification, sexual fulfilment or the aesthetic enjoyment of life.

Kama or KAMA may also refer to:

== Places ==
- Kama District, a district of Ningarhar province in Afghanistan
- Kama, Fukuoka, a city in Japan
- Kama, Iran, a village in Gilan Provine, Iran
- Kama (river), a tributary of the Volga in Russia
- Kama valley, Tibet, a Himalayan valley, just east of Mount Everest

== People ==
- Kama (name), a given name and surname
- Charles Wright (wrestler), who performed as Kama

== Military ==
- Kama tank school (German: Panzerschule Kama), a secret training school for tank commanders operated by the German Reichswehr near Kazan, Soviet Union
- 23rd Waffen Mountain Division of the SS Kama (2nd Croatian), a German military unit of World War II

== Other ==
- Kama (tool), Japanese sickle
- Kama (Japanese tea ceremony), iron pots used to heat water in Japanese tea ceremonies
- KAMA, the ICAO code for Rick Husband Amarillo International Airport
- Kamadeva, a Hindu god
- Nyko Kama, a wireless nunchuk for the Wii
- Kama (food), Estonian food
- Kama Automobile Company, a Chinese auto manufacturer

== See also ==
- Kam (disambiguation)
- Karma (disambiguation)
- Kama Sutra (disambiguation)
- Cama (disambiguation)
- Manmadhan (disambiguation), another name for Kamadeva
- Kaama, 1999 Indian film
