= Kama Steliga =

Canadian activist

- Born: 1967 (age 58–59); Kennewick, Washington, U.S.
- Occupation: Activist

Kama Steliga (born 1967 in Kennewick, Washington, United States) is a Canadian activist and serves as the executive director of Lillooet Friendship Centre Society. It is an organization with the main focus of empowering Indigenous peoples in Canada through individual, family, and community programs and services.

== Biography ==
Steliga's work focuses on the small town of Lillooet in Canada. The project initially started as a project for women victims of trauma. After that further funding was acquired to continue the work and extend the support to other parts of the community. She is advocating against the cut of government support for homeless people in her hometown. Over 300 people rely on assistance of the food bank on a monthly basis, which is up to ten percent of the population of the whole town. The town suffers from a poor economy, racial tensions and lack of government support. Steliga and her organization are trying to address these issues by bringing together people of different ethnicities and shining a light on the issues striking the poorest, like HIV/AIDS. The center includes an employment centre, a food bank, a thrift store, addiction counseling and other related services, a homelessness initiative, information and support related to violence against women, efforts to raise awareness of HIV/AIDS and cross-cultural bridge-building events. Steliga sees her work in raising HIV/AIDS awareness as very important as her husband is HIV positive and one of the longest-living survivors of the Canadian Red Cross tainted blood scandal after receiving a transfusion with tainted blood from the Red Cross.

Steliga was nominated for the Nobel Peace Prize in 2005 along with 1000 other women from 150 countries. She was initially nominated by Sarah Chandler. The 1000 women nominated were all part of a list submitted by the 1000 Women Association. The Nobel Prize committee officially accepted the nomination at the end of June 2005.
