= Nyko Kama =

Third-party Nunchuk accessory

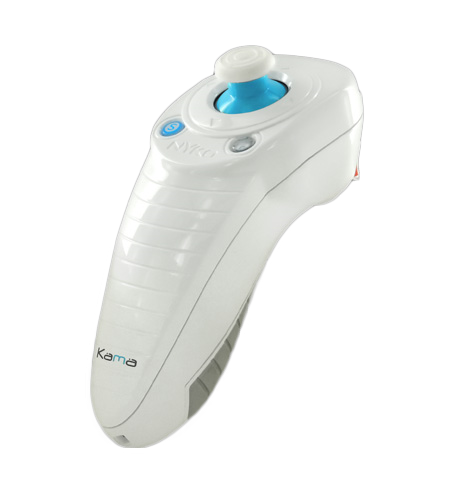
- Manufacturer: Nyko
- Type: Video game controller
- Generation: Seventh generation
- Lifespan: May 27, 2008

The Nyko Kama is a third-party Nunchuk accessory created for the Wii video game console by Nyko, available in wireless or wired versions. In contrast to Nintendo's device, the controller takes its name from the traditional Japanese kama; a stealthy, curved weapon. Like the original Nunchuk, the Kama features an analog control stick, and "Z" and "C" buttons. With the use of 2 AAA batteries and an adapter dongle that plugs into the Wii Remote's expansion port, the wireless Kama is able to connect wirelessly. The wired version instead features a rumble motor, which allows it to offer force feedback when used with Nyko's Wand Wii Remote alternative.

== History ==
When first announced in late 2007, the Kama was simply dubbed the "Wireless Nunchuk". It was given its final name shortly before its release, upon which IGN observed that Nyko had "molded the Kama body very much along the lines of the Nunchuk's curves and ergonomics, and at first grasp the two feel nearly identical." Likewise, CNET said that "the only real difference between the Kama and original are the C and Z trigger buttons, which have gotten a nice transparent makeover. The joystick, however, is nearly identical."

In mid-2008, Nyko were sued by Nintendo over the controller, who asserted that the Kama "wholly appropriate[d] the novel shape, design, overall appearance and even the color and materials used in the Nintendo Nunchuk controller." A spokesman for Nyko said at the time that they "[had] not knowingly violated anyone's intellectual property". The case was ultimately settled, with Nyko pledging to continue selling a redesigned version of the Kama. No further terms of the settlement were disclosed, but Gizmodo speculated Nyko had paid a "sizable" amount to Nintendo.

According to a Nyko spokesman, the redesign of the Kama entailed a wider shape, curved Z button, a grooved handle, rubber battery cover and a new color scheme. Alongside the redesigned wireless Kama, Nyko unveiled a wired version which added a rumble motor, a feature not included in previous Nunchuks, first-party or otherwise. This requires the use of Nyko's Wand controllers, due to its reliance on their proprietary "Trans-Port Technology".
