= Khamir =

Khamir may refer to:

- Khamir, sometimes called Bandar Khamir, a city in Iran
  - Khamir County, an administrative subdivision of Iran
  - Khamir Rural District, an administrative subdivision of Iran
- Khamir, Yemen, a small city in Yemen
  - Khamir District, an administrative subdivision of Yemen
