= Kama Tarkhan =

Kama Tarkhan was a legendary ancestor-king of the Altyn Oba Horde located on the steppes to the north of the Black Sea.

When Jin Zhun overthrew Liu Can, many of the Hunnish tribes around Pingyang (平陽, in modern Linfen, Shanxi) fled west along the Silk Road appearing in Transoxiana as the Chionites around 320 AD. However, there is no one in the Liu family whose name sounds like "Kama Tarkhan". If Kama Tarkhan was of this same group, then he would have been related to Kidara of the Ki clan (of Yuezhi ethnicity), who led a Bactrian portion of Chionites to overthrow the Kushans in India. In this case he might have been the Chionite king Grumbat mentioned by Ammianus Marcellinus and included in the Kidara dynastic list of the Chionite Ki clan. The journey of the Ki clan from Bactria to the Ukrainian and Danubian plains is recorded in various myths about the origins of the European Huns recorded in the Kiev Chronicles, and by Bar Hebraeus, as well as in the Chronicle of the late 12th-century Jacobite patriarch of Antioch Michael the Syrian. However, this is two centuries later than the alleged date for Kama Tarkhan.

If they were related to the Chionites, Kidarites, Alchon, and Hunas, Kama Tarkhan's "Huns" would have had to have gone west, to the Black Desert and ultimately to the Black Sea Steppes. However the so-called "Huns" remaining in the Red Desert eventually united with the Uar in 460 AD and established the Hephthalite empire under which they flourished until the mid 6th century AD.

An alternative identification would be that he was the chief who led the Huns to appear in the west near the Caspian Sea, according to Tacitus at the turn of the 1st century AD, in retreat from the mad campaign of Ban Chao (班超) against the Xiongnu.

== Sources ==
- V.Zlatarski, Izvestieto na Mihail Sirijski za preselenieto na bylgarite. – V: Izbrani proizvedenija, I., S., 1972, s.52
