= Khamachon =

- Village
- Location in Punjab, India Khamachon (India)
- Coordinates: 31.1872517°N 76.014937°E
- Country: India
- State: Punjab
- District: Shaheed Bhagat Singh Nagar

Government
  - Type: Panchayat raj
  - Body: Gram panchayat
- Elevation: 251 m (823 ft)

Population (2011)
  - Total: 1,468
- Sex ratio 760/708 ♂/♀

Languages
  - Official: Punjabi
- Time zone: UTC+5:30 (IST)
- PIN: 144505
- Telephone code: 01884
- ISO 3166 code: IN-PB
- Post office: Banga
- Website: nawanshahr.nic.in

Khamachon is a village in Shaheed Bhagat Singh Nagar district of Punjab State, India. It is located 2.8 kilometres (1.7 mi) away from postal head office Banga, 13.5 kilometres (8.4 mi) from Nawanshahr, 12 kilometres (7.5 mi) from district headquarter Shaheed Bhagat Singh Nagar and 103 kilometres (64 mi) from state capital Chandigarh. The village is administrated by Sarpanch an elected representative of the village.

== Demography ==
As of 2011, Khamachon has a total number of 310 houses and population of 1468 of which 760 include are males while 708 are females according to the report published by Census India in 2011. The literacy rate of Khamachon is 72.79% lower than the state average of 75.84%. The population of children under the age of 6 years is 178 which is 12.13% of total population of Khamachon, and child sex ratio is approximately 894 as compared to Punjab state average of 846.

Most of the people are from Schedule Caste which constitutes 76.91% of total population in Khamachon. The town does not have any Schedule Tribe population so far.

As per the report published by Census India in 2011, 466 people were engaged in work activities out of the total population of Khamachon which includes 408 males and 58 females. According to census survey report 2011, 74.68% workers describe their work as main work and 25.32% workers are involved in Marginal activity providing livelihood for less than 6 months.

== Education ==
The village has a Punjabi medium, co-ed primary school established in 1961. The school provide mid-day meal as per Indian Midday Meal Scheme. As per Right of Children to Free and Compulsory Education Act the school provide free education to children between the ages of 6 and 14.

Amardeep Singh Shergill Memorial college Mukandpur and Sikh National College Banga are the nearest colleges. Industrial Training Institute for women (ITI Nawanshahr) is 16 kilometres (9.9 mi) The village is 60 kilometres (37 mi) from Indian Institute of Technology and 34 kilometres (21 mi) away from Lovely Professional University.

== Transport ==
Banga railway station is the nearest train station however, Garhshankar Junction railway station is 14 kilometres (8.7 mi) away from the village. Sahnewal Airport is the nearest domestic airport which located 62 kilometres (39 mi) away in Ludhiana and the nearest international airport is located in Chandigarh also Sri Guru Ram Dass Jee International Airport is the second nearest airport which is 142 kilometres (88 mi) away in Amritsar.

== See also ==
- List of villages in India
