= Kam (folklore) =

Kam is a spiritual practitioner and religious figure in the traditional cultures of the Turkic and Mongolic speaking peoples, commonly associated with shamanism. The term is also rendered as Gam or Ham. A kam is a religious figure believed to communicate with supernatural forces within their community.

== Etymology ==
The word is derived from the root (Kam/Gam). It is associated with the meaning of brilliance or dazzling brightness and is related to the Turkish word kamaşmak (to be dazzled). The verb kamamak means to close or lock something, which may be connected to the idea of capturing spirits. Kamanmak, meanwhile, means to feel overwhelmed or distressed.

In Mongolian, hamah means to gather, and shamanic ceremonies often involve bringing people together. The root Kam/Kama in Mongolian, Turkish, and Tungusic languages is also associated with words conveying the meanings of community, gathering, coming together, and being together. In Old Tungusic, Kum means spirit. In Mongolian, Keme/Heme refers to divination. In Old Altaic, the term is associated with the meaning of walking.

Gumilev argued that the words kam and kamlık cannot be attested before the 7th century AD and that they emerged among the Altai Turks between the 7th and 12th centuries. He therefore maintained that shamanism was subsequently adopted into Turkic culture. Özhan Öztürk, meanwhile, claimed that the word was related to the Japanese word kami, meaning "god".

== Ancient religious beliefs of the Turkic peoples ==
According to Alâ’ed-Dîn Jüwaynī, the ancient Turks called their religious leaders "Tuyuk", while their religion was called "Nom", a term also associated with the Arabic words "Namus" and "En-Nevâmis-i İlâhiye". This word, which entered Greek as "Numus–Havus", was used in the sense of "eternal will and sacred things". In Sanskrit, it was also used as a word meaning "God".

The Turks called their spiritual leaders "Tüyun/Tuyon", and their diviners and magicians "Kam". They also referred to their religious books as "Nom" and their Tüyuns as "Nomiler". Following the adoption of Islam, the Oghuz called their kams "Ozan". The word "Shaman", meanwhile, was described as a distorted form of this term introduced by Europeans.

Shamans performed three different roles within society: those of physician, magician, and diviner. The Turkist writer Ziya Gökalp argued that the original name of the ancient religion of the Turks, incorrectly referred to by Europeans as "Shamanism", should instead be "Tuyonism".

According to another of Ziya Gökalp's arguments, although the religion of the Turks was initially perceived as "Naturalism", it was actually a form of "Symbolism" consisting of various symbols and the veneration of representations. If religion and magic are distinguished within this belief system, which spread among communities living under different conditions, two distinct traditions can be identified: a form of Animism consisting of a kind of Shamanism, and a separate "Tuyonism" characterized by its own deities and cosmological system.

=== Kamhan ===
Kamhan is a legendary khan in Turkic and Altai mythology. He is also known as Kamgan or Gamhan. He is an ancestor of Bayındır Khan and is also a powerful kam. In ancient Turkic society, khans also served as kams who stood at the head of their communities. The word kam means shaman in Turkish.

=== Porhan ===
According to Abdülkadir İnan, the word Porhan is a variant pronunciation of Burhan (shamanic spirit), and evolved into Perihan under the influence of Persian culture.
