= Khamas, Khuzestan =

Khamas خماس
- Village
- Location within Iran
- Coordinates: 31°51′23″N 48°39′29″E
- Country: Iran
- Province: Khuzestan
- County: Shushtar
- Bakhsh: Shadravan
- Rural District: Shoaybiyeh-ye Gharbi

Population (2006)
  - Total: 326
- Time zone: UTC+3:30 (IRST)
  - Summer (DST): UTC+4:30 (IRDT)

Khamas (Persian: خماس, also Romanized as Khamās and Khammās) is a village in Shoaybiyeh-ye Gharbi Rural District, Shadravan District, Shushtar County, Khuzestan Province, Iran. At the 2006 census, its population was 326, in 56 families.
