= Khamis =

Khamis (Arabic: خميس) is the 5th day of the week (Thursday) in Arabic. It may also refer to:

- Khamis (name)
- Khamis, Bahrain, a place in Bahrain
- Khamis Brigade, special forces brigade of the military of Libya
- Khamis Mushait, a city in Saudi Arabia
