= Makasar, Jakarta =

District in East Jakarta, Indonesia

Coordinates: 6°16′S 106°53′E

Makasar is a district (kecamatan) of East Jakarta, Indonesia. It had an area of 21.85 km^{2} and population of 185,830 at the 2010 Census; the latest official estimate (for mid 2019) is 204,595.

The boundaries of Makasar District are Kali Malang channel to the north, Sunter River to the east, Jagorawi Toll Road to the west, and Taman Mini 2 – Pondok Gede Raya Road to the south. The Taman Mini Indonesia Indah area is located in Cipayung District (Setu Administrative Village), but the museum complex of Purna Bhakti Pertiwi, a museum also located in Taman Mini Indonesia Indah, is located in Makasar District (Pinang Ranti Administrative Village).

== Kampung Makasar ==
Kampung Makasar is an area that is located in Makasar Administrative Village and part of Kebon Pala Administrative Village (Kramat Jati District). The area is known as "Kampung Makasar" (Makasar Village) because it was used as a settlement for people from Makasar, under the leadership of Captain Daeng Matara in 1686. These people are former war prisoners that was brought to Batavia after the Gowa Sultanate, under the sultanate of Sultan Hasanuddin, was defeated by the Dutch Empire.

== Kelurahan (administrative village) ==
The district of Makasar is divided into five administrative villages (kelurahan):

- Pinang Ranti – area code 13560
- Makasar – area code 13570
- Halim Perdanakusuma – area code 13610
- Cipinang Melayu – area code 13620
- Kebon Pala – area code 13650

== List of important places ==
- Taman Mini Indonesia Indah (TMII) where includes Purna Bhakti Pertiwi Museum and At-Tin Mosque
- Halim Perdanakusuma International Airport
