= Cama (surname) =

Cama is a surname. Notable people with this surname include:

- Alba Rojo Cama (1961–2016), Mexican sculptor
- Alice Cama (born 1987), Italian footballer
- Bhikaiji Cama (1861–1936), Indian independence activist
- Concepció Veray Cama (born 1976), Spanish politician
- Cyrus Cama (born 1971), Indian Olympic sailor
- Fereimi Cama (1955–2021), Fijian Anglican bishop
- Fernanda Cama Lima (born 1977), Brazilian television presenter
- James Cama (1957–2014), American martial artist
- Jioji Cama, Fijian rugby footballer
- Junior Tomasi Cama (born 1980), New Zealand rugby footballer, son of Tomasi
- Kharshedji Rustomji Cama (1831–1909), Indian Parsi scholar and reformer
- Marcel Cama i Marquès (born 1935), Spanish motorcyclist
- Martí Cama i Prats (1864–1914), Spanish cork manufacturer
- Tomasi Cama (born 1961), Fijian rugby footballer, father of Junior
