= KAM Manufacturing =

Handbag manufacturer in Ohio, United States

KAM Manufacturing is a handbag manufacturer located in Van Wert, Ohio, USA. Founded in 1988 by Kim Adams, the company has been in business for more than 25 years. The company's factory was destroyed by a tornado in 2002. The company produced handbags for Vera Bradley until ending its relationship with Vera Bradley Designs in 2008, when the company announced it would lay off 140 employees and possibly discontinue operations by the end of the year. The company instead established the Stephanie Dawn brand that year. KAM was named small business of the year in Van Wert County in 2006 and was awarded a Blue Ribbon by the U.S. Chamber of Commerce.

Retailers carrying Stephanie Dawn include the Artists’ Colony in Northeast Ohio and Kristina's Gifts in Waynesburg, Ohio. as well as Karen's Gifts in New Port Richey, Florida. Stephanie Dawn sponsored "The Art of Fiber" exhibition at the Wassenberg Art Center in January 2011.

KAM Manufacturing Inc discontinued the Stephanie Dawn brand at the end of 2021 due to their contract cut and sew business outpacing the production needs of Stephanie Dawn. No employees were laid off due to this and as of 2024 they have doubled their workforce size. They now produce non apparel consumer, commercial and military products for many different private label customers.
