= Ciracas =

- District
- Map of Ciracas District

- Location in Java
- Coordinates: 6°19′37″S 106°52′30″E
- Country: Indonesia
- Province: DKI Jakarta
- Administrative city: East Jakarta
- Established: 1991

Government
  - Camat (Subdistrict Mayor): Musa Syafrudin

Area
  - Total: 16.08 km^{2} (6.21 sq mi)
- Elevation: 61 m (200 ft)

Population
  - Estimate (2018): 279,628
  - Density: 17,597/km^{2} (45,580/sq mi)
- Time zone: +7

Ciracas is a district (kecamatan) of East Jakarta, one of the five administrative cities of Jakarta, Indonesia. Ciracas is the southernmost district in Jakarta. The boundaries of Ciracas District are: Cipinang River to the west, Cipinang River - Jambore Road to the south, Jagorawi Tollroad to the east, and Kelapa Dua Wetan Road to the north.

== History ==
During the Dutch East Indies period, Ciracas was a part of Meester Cornelis. In 1976, Ciracas was incorporated into Pasar Rebo subdistrict, East Jakarta. Subsequently, in 1991 Pasar Rebo was split into two districts, Pasar Rebo itself and Ciracas as a new district.

== Kelurahan (Administrative/Urban Villages) ==
The district of Ciracas is divided into 5 administrative villages (kelurahan):

- Cibubur - postal code 13720
- Kelapa Dua Wetan - postal code 13730
- Ciracas - postal code 13740
- Susukan - postal code 13750
- Rambutan - postal code 13830

== List of important places ==
- Kampung Rambutan Bus Terminal
- Cibubur Market
- Cibubur Junction
- Ciracas Market
- Gelanggang Remaja (Youth Court)
- Religious Court of East Jakarta
- Sports Court of Ciracas

== Toll Road Access ==
Toll Road	Toll Gate	KM
Jagorawi Toll Road	Cibubur	13
Jakarta Outer Ring Road	Kampung Rambutan	31
Jakarta Outer Ring Road	Bambu Apus	34
TMII-Bogor Toll Road (planned)	Ciracas	7

== Public Transportation ==
=== Rail-Based Transportation ===
- LRT Jabodebek Ciracas Station (Cibubur Line)
- LRT Jabodebek Kampung Rambutan Station (Cibubur Line)
- MRT Jakarta Raya Bogor Station (Planned)
- MRT Jakarta Tanah Merdeka Station (Planned)
- MRT Jakarta Kampung Rambutan Station (Planned)

=== Road-Based Transportation ===
- Transjakarta Route 1K (Cibubur – Blok M)
- Transjakarta Route 1T (Cibubur – Balai Kota)
- Transjakarta Route 6P (Cibubur – Kuningan)
- Transjakarta Corridor 7 (Kampung Rambutan – Kampung Melayu)
- Transjakarta Route 7A (Kampung Rambutan – Lebak Bulus)
- Transjakarta Route 7B (Kampung Rambutan – Blok M)
- Transjakarta Route 7C (Cibubur – Cawang Cililitan)
- Transjakarta Route 7E (Kampung Rambutan – Ragunan)
- Transjakarta Route 7F (Kampung Rambutan – Juanda via Cempaka Putih)
- Transjakarta Route 7R (Cibubur – Pluit)
- Transjakarta Route 7T (Cibubur – Tanjung Priok)
- Transjakarta Route 7U (Cibubur – Ancol)
- Transjakarta Route 7V (Cibubur – Kampung Rambutan)
- Transjakarta Route 10D (Tanjung Priok – Kampung Rambutan)
- Transjakarta Route M7 (Kampung Rambutan – Kampung Melayu) Night Bus Service
- Transjakarta Route S22 (Ciputat – Kampung Rambutan)
- Mikrotrans JAK 06 (Kampung Rambutan – Pondok Gede)
- Mikrotrans JAK 19 (Pinang Ranti – Kampung Rambutan)
- Mikrotrans JAK 25 (Kampung Rambutan – Kalisari)
- Mikrotrans JAK 28 (Pasar Rebo – St. LRT Harjamukti)
- Mikrotrans JAK 38 (Bulak Ringin – Kampung Rambutan)
- Mikrotrans JAK 71 (Kampung Rambutan – Pinang Ranti)
- Mikrotrans JAK 72 (Kampung Rambutan – Pasar Rebo via Poncol)
- Mikrotrans Jak 98 (Term. Kampung Rambutan – Munjul)
