= Harjamukti LRT station =

Light rapid transit station in West Java, Indonesia

CB12 Harjamukti
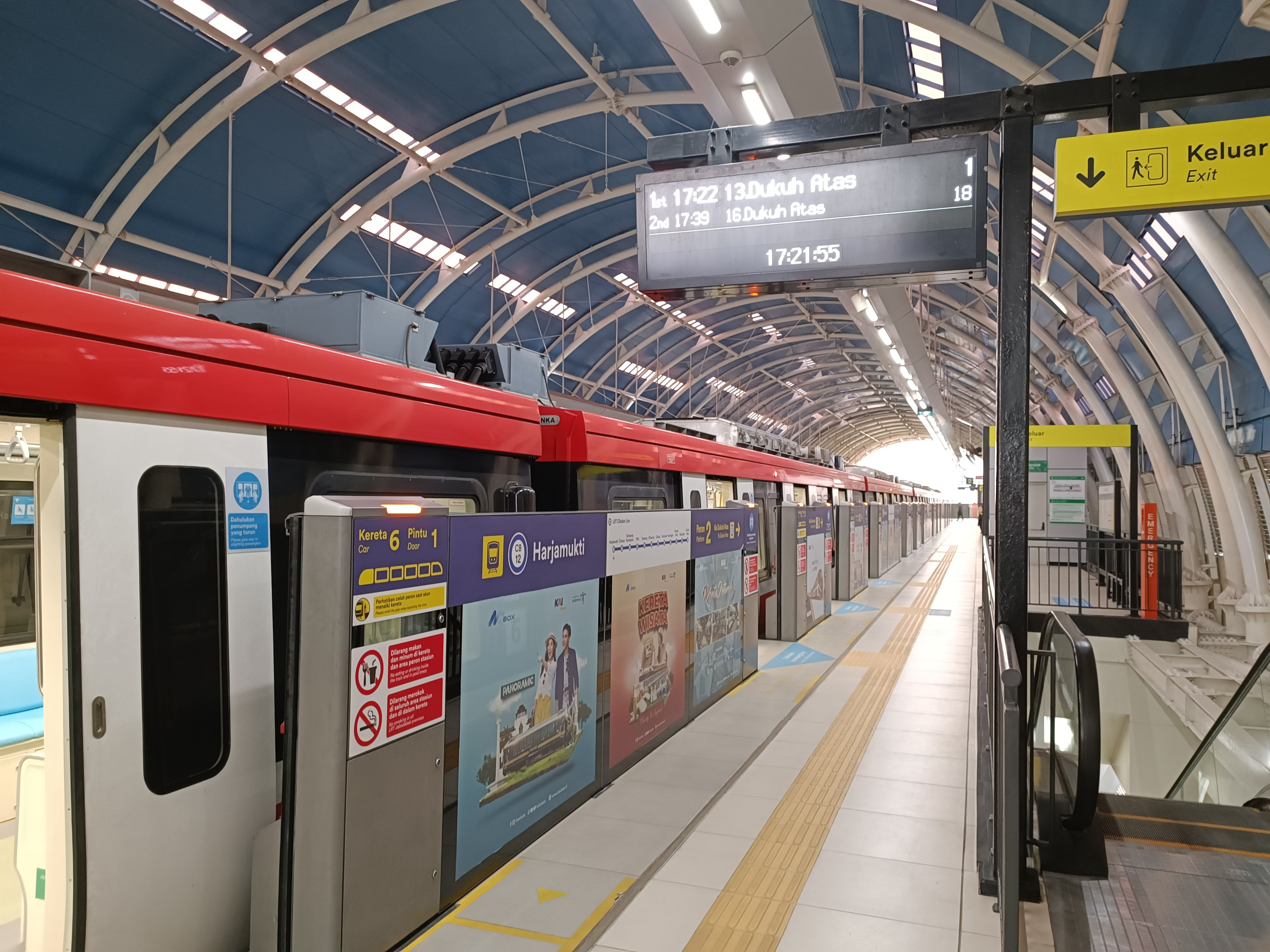
- Harjamukti LRT Station platform, 2023

General information
- Location: Jalan Taman Bunga Wiladatika, Harjamukti, Cimanggis, Depok, West Java, Indonesia
- Coordinates: 6.373988°S 106.895623°E
- System: Jabodebek LRT station
- Owner: Ministry of Transportation via the Directorate General of Railways
- Manager: Kereta Api Indonesia
- Line: Cibubur Line
- Platforms: 2 side platforms
- Tracks: 2

Construction
- Structure type: Elevated
- Cycle facilities: Bicycle parking
- Accessible: Yes

Other information
- Station code: HAR

History
- Opened: 28 August 2023
- Electrified: 2019

Services
Preceding station		Following station
Ciracas towards Dukuh Atas	Cibubur Line	Terminus
Route map
Location

Harjamukti LRT Station (HAR) is a light rapid transit station located in Harjamukti, Cimanggis, Depok, West Java. This station, which is operated by PT Kereta Api Indonesia (Persero), is the terminus station of the Cibubur Line, which is part of LRT Jabodebek. Commuters along The Transyogi Road (which is a major road) are also served by this LRT station. The station is also located and connected to a TOD (Transit Oriented Development) project. The development is currently under construction. In the future a planned extension of the Cibubur Line will extend the line to Bogor.

== Station layout ==
2nd Floor	Side platform, the doors are opened on the right side
2nd Floor	Line 1	Cibubur Line to Dukuh Atas Bank Syariah Indonesia	(Ciracas) →
2nd Floor	Line 2	Cibubur Line to Dukuh Atas Bank Syariah Indonesia	(Ciracas) →
2nd Floor	Side platform, the doors are opened on the right side
1st Floor	Concourse	Ticket counter, ticket vending machines, fare gates, and retail kiosks
Ground Floor	Street	Entrance and exit

== Services ==
Line	Line Terminus	
Cibubur Line	Dukuh Atas Bank Syariah Indonesia	Harjamukti

== Supporting transportation ==
Type	Line	Destination
Transjakarta		Cawang Sentral 2–Harjamukti LRT station–Depok Terimal (transfer to)
Mikrotrans Transjakarta	JAK-28	Stasiun LRT Harjamukti–Susukan (via Bulak Sereh)
Mikrotrans Transjakarta	JAK-73	Stasiun LRT Harjamukti–Susukan (via Lapangan Tembak)
Trans Pakuan	FE-01	Botani Square–Harjamukti LRT station
Trans Pakuan	FE-02	Bubulak Terminal–Harjamukti LRT station
JR Connexion	Ciputra Development	Citra Indah Jonggol–Citraland Cibubur–Harjamukti LRT station
JR Connexion	Sinar Jaya (Sinar Mas Land)	Living World Kota Wisata–Harjamukti LRT station
