= East Jakarta =

Administrative city in Jakarta, Indonesia

Coordinates: 6°14′43″S 106°54′02″E

East Jakarta Jakarta Timur
- Administrative city
- Administrative City of East Jakarta; Kota Administrasi Jakarta Timur

Other transcription(s)
  - Betawi: Jakartè Belah Wètan
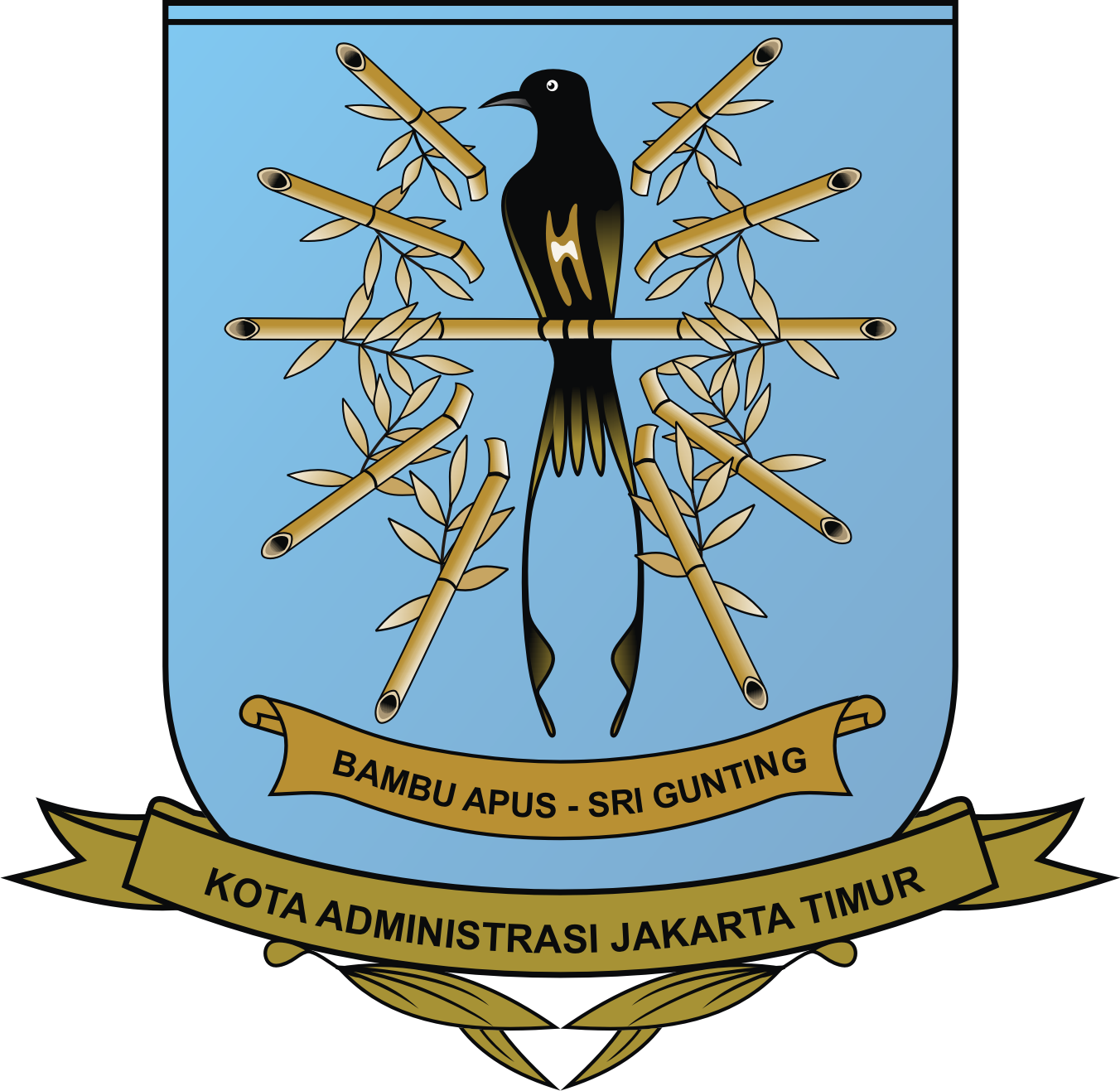
- Seal
- Interactive map of East Jakarta
- Country: Indonesia
- Special Region: Jakarta

Government
  - Mayor: Munjirin
  - Vice Mayor: Kusmanto

Area
  - Total: 188.03 km^{2} (72.60 sq mi)

Population (mid 2025 estimate)
  - Total: 3,225,299
  - Density: 17,153/km^{2} (44,426/sq mi)
- Time zone: UTC+7 (WIB)
- Vehicle registration: B xxxx Txx
- HDI (2024): ▲0.846 (8th) very high
- Website: timur.jakarta.go.id

East Jakarta (Indonesian: Jakarta Timur; Betawi: Jakarté Bèlétan), abbreviated as Jaktim, is the largest of the five administrative cities (kota administrasi) which form the Special Capital Region of Jakarta, Indonesia, with a land area of 188.03 km^{2} (72.6 sq.miles). It had a population of 2,693,896 at the 2010 Census and 3,037,139 at the 2020 Census; the official estimate as at mid 2025 was 3,225,299, making it the most populous of the five administrative cities within Jakarta. East Jakarta is not self-governed and does not have a city council, hence it is not classified as a proper municipality.

East Jakarta is bounded by North Jakarta to the north, Bekasi to the east, Depok to the south, and South Jakarta and Central Jakarta to the west.

The mayor's office is located in the Administrative Village (Kelurahan) of Pulo Gebang, in Cakung District.

== Administrative districts ==
East Jakarta Administrative City (Kota Administrasi Jakarta Timur) is subdivided into ten districts (kecamatan), listed below with their areas and their populations at the 2010 Census and 2020 Census, together with their official estimates as at mid 2025. The table also includes the locations of the district administrative centres, the number of administrative villages ( all classed as urban kelurahan) in each district, and their names (with their post codes).

Kode Wilayah	Name of District (kecamatan)	Area in km^{2})	Pop'n 2010 Census	Pop'n 2020 Census	Pop'n mid 2025 Estimate	Pop'n density 2025 (/km^{2})	Admin centre	No. of kelurahan	Kelurahan with their Post codes
31.75.05	Pasar Rebo	12.98	189,232	220,583	235,851	18,170	Pekayon	5	Pekayon (13710), Gedong (13760), Cijantung (13770), Baru (13780), Kalisari (13790)
31.75.09	Ciracas	16.08	251,757	296,316	319,431	19,865	Ciracas	5	Cibubur (13720), Kelapa Dua Wetan (13730), Ciracas (13740), Susukan (13750), Rambutan (13750)
31.75.10	Cipayung	28.45	228,536	285,650	306,380	10,769	Cipayung	8	Lubang Buaya (13810), Ceger (13820), Cipayung (13840), Munjul (13850), Pondok Ranggon (13860), Cilangkap (13870), Setu (13880), Bambu Apus (13890)
31.75.08	Makasar	21.85	185,830	207,293	221,067	10,117	Makasar	5	Pinang Ranti (13560), Makasar (13570), Halim Perdana Kusumah (13610), Cipinang Melayu (13620), Kebon Pala (13650)
31.75.04	Kramat Jati	13.00	272,479	298,437	317,017	24,386	Kramat Jati	7	Kramat Jati (13510), Batu Ampar (13520), Balekambang (13530), Kampung Tengah (13540), Dukuh (13550), Cawang (13640), Cililitan (13640)
31.75.03	Jatinegara	10.25	266,734	301,717	318,580	31,081	Cipinang Cempedak	8	Bali Mester (13310), Kampung Melayu (13320), Bidaracina (13330), Cipinang Cempedak (13340), Rawa Bunga (13350), Cipinang Besar Selatan (13410), Cipinang Besar Utara (13410), Cipinang Muara (13420)
31.75.07	Duren Sawit	22.65	384,748	414,604	444,385	19,620	Duren Sawit	7	Pondok Bambu (13430), Duren Sawit (13440), Pondok Kelapa (13450), Pondok Kopi (13460), Malaka Jaya (13460), Malaka Sari (13460), Klender (13470)
31.75.06	Cakung	42.28	503,846	559,040	582,775	13,784	Cakung Barat	7	Cakung Barat (13910), Cakung Timur (13910), Rawa Terate (13920), Jatinegara (13930), Penggilingan (13940), Pulo Gebang (13950), Ujung Menteng (13960)
31.75.02	Pulo Gadung	15.61	262,328	281,319	296,972	19,024	Jatinegara	7	Kayu Putih (13210), Jati (13220), Rawamangun (13220), Pisangan Timur (13230), Cipinang (13240), Jatinegara Kaum (13250), Pulo Gadung (13260)
31.75.01	Matraman	4.88	148,406	172,180	182,841	37,467	Utan Kayu Utara	6	Pisangan Baru (13110), Utan Kayu Selatan (13120), Utan Kayu Utara (13120), Kayu Manis (13130), Pal Meriam (13140), Kebon Manggis (13150)
	Totals	188.03	2,693,896	3,037,139	3,225,299	17,153	Cakung	65	

== Economy ==
Aviastar Mandiri has its head office in East Jakarta.

In the past, in East Jakarta, there are 23 Sugar mills such as Setu, Jatiwarna, Ceger, Kalijereng, Pedongkelan (Cimanggis), Palsigunung, Klender, Pondokjati and Cibubur is open in 1914 and is closed due to the 1997 Asian financial crisis.

The sugar mills were first open in Klender ((in Dutch): Suikerfabriek Klender) in 1905.

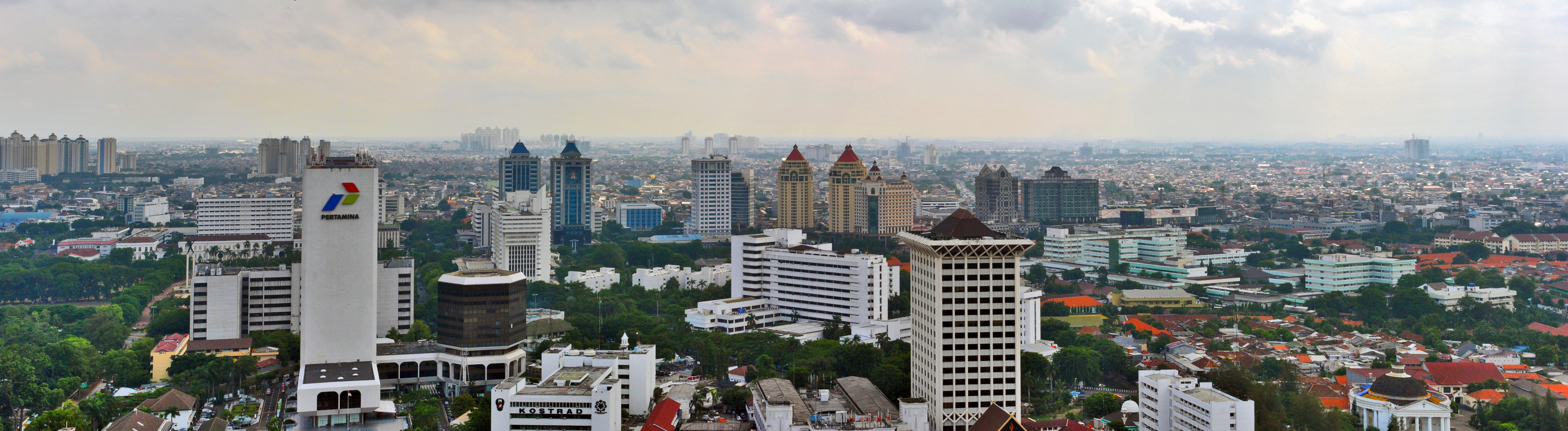
Skyline view of East Jakarta

== Transportation ==
- Halim Perdanakusuma International Airport serves a limited customer base; typically within an hour flight of the airport.
- Kampung Rambutan Bus Terminal mainly provides service to inter-provincial, inter-city buses.
- Pulogebang inter-city and inter-province bus terminal, opened on June 23, 2012.
