= Tangut =

Tangut may refer to:

- Tangut people, an ancient ethnic group in Northwest China
- Tangut language, the extinct language spoken by the Tangut people
- Tangut script, the writing system used to write the Tangut language
- Tangut (Unicode block)
- Western Xia (1038–1227), also known as the Tangut Empire, a state founded by the Tangut people

In 18th and 19th century works, the term 'Tangut' is often used as a synonym for Tibet or Tibetan, and may refer to:

- Tibet
- Tibetan people
- Tibetan language
- Tibetan script

A number of plants found in the region of Tibet have been given the specific epithet tangutica or tanguticus:

- Anisodus tanguticus
- Caragana tangutica
- Caryopteris tangutica
- Clematis tangutica
- Daphne tangutica
- Lonicera tangutica
- Prunus tangutica
- Saussurea tangutica
- Scopolia tangutica
- Sinacalia tangutica
