= Crore =

Indian numbering system name for ten million

A crore (/krɔːr/; abbreviated cr) is a quantity of ten million (10,000,000 or 10^{7}) in the Indian numbering system, equal to 100 lakh. In the Indian convention of digit grouping, it is formatted 1,00,00,000. The crore is widely used both in official and other contexts in Bangladesh, Bhutan, India, Myanmar, Nepal, and Pakistan. The next named numbers after it are arab (a billion), and kharab (a hundred billion), although they are not widely used in the modern-day Indian subcontinent.

== Etymology and regional variants ==
The word crore derives from the Prakrit word kroḍi, which in turn comes from the Sanskrit word कोटि (koṭi), denoting ten million in the Indian numbering system, which has separate terms for most powers of ten from 10^{0} up to 10^{19}.

=== By language ===
==== South Asia ====
- Assamese: কোটি (kōṭi)
- Bengali: কোটি (kōṭi), though some also use ক্রোড় (krōṛ)
- Hindustani: Hindi करोड़ (karōṛ); Urdu کروڑ (karoṛ)
- Gujarati: કરોડ (karōḍ)
- Kannada: ಕೋಟಿ (kōṭi)
- Kashmiri: کۄرور (kọrōr)
- Malayalam: കോടി (kōṭi)
- Marathi: कोटी (kōṭī)
- Nepali: करोड (karōḍ)
- Odia: କୋଟି (kōṭi)
- Pali (historical): koṭi
- Punjabi: Gurmukhi ਕਰੋੜ (karōṛ); Shahmukhi کروڑ (karoṛ)
- Sanskrit: कोटि (koṭi)
- Sindhi: ڪروڙ (karoṛ)
- Sinhala: කෝටිය (kōṭiya)
- Tamil: கோடி (kōṭi)
- Telugu: కోటి (kōṭi)

==== Outside South Asia ====
In several languages outside South Asia, Sanskrit koṭi was borrowed or translated, mainly through Buddhist texts. The terms below are largely archaic, literary or religious.

- Burmese: ကုဋေ (ku.te), from Pali
- Chinese: 俱胝 (jūzhī, Mid. Ch.: kju trij) or 俱致 (jūzhì), transcriptions of koṭi used in Buddhist texts. Transferred into:
  - Japanese: 倶胝 (kutei)
  - Korean: 구지 (俱胝; guji)
- Khmer: កោដិ (kaot)
- Malay (including modern Malaysian and Indonesian variants): کتي keti, found in classical literature, where it denotes 100,000 (one lakh) rather than 10,000,000
- Thai: โกฏิ (kot), rarely used as a numeral and now mostly meaning "very many"
- Tibetan: བྱེ་བ་ (bye ba), the traditional Tibetan word for 10^{7}, used to translate Sanskrit koṭi

== Money ==
Large amounts of money in India, Bangladesh and Pakistan are often written in terms of crore. For example 150,000,000 (one hundred and fifty million) rupees is written as "fifteen crore rupees", "₹ 15 crore". In the abbreviated form, usage such as "₹ 15 cr" is common.

Trillions (in the short scale) of money are often written or spoken of in terms of lakh crore. For example, one trillion rupees is equivalent to:

- ₹1 lakh crore
- ₹10^{12}
- ₹10,00,00,00,00,000 in Indian notation
- ₹1,000,000,000,000 in metric notation

== See also ==
- English numerals
- Hebdo-
- Myriad (10,000)
- Names of large numbers

== Sources ==
- Chisholm, Hugh, ed. (1911). "Crore" . Encyclopædia Britannica (11th ed.). Cambridge University Press.
- "Crore". Merriam-Webster.com Dictionary. Merriam-Webster. OCLC 1032680871.
