= Cikoko (Transjakarta) =

Bus rapid transit station in Jakarta, Indonesia

9 06 Cikoko
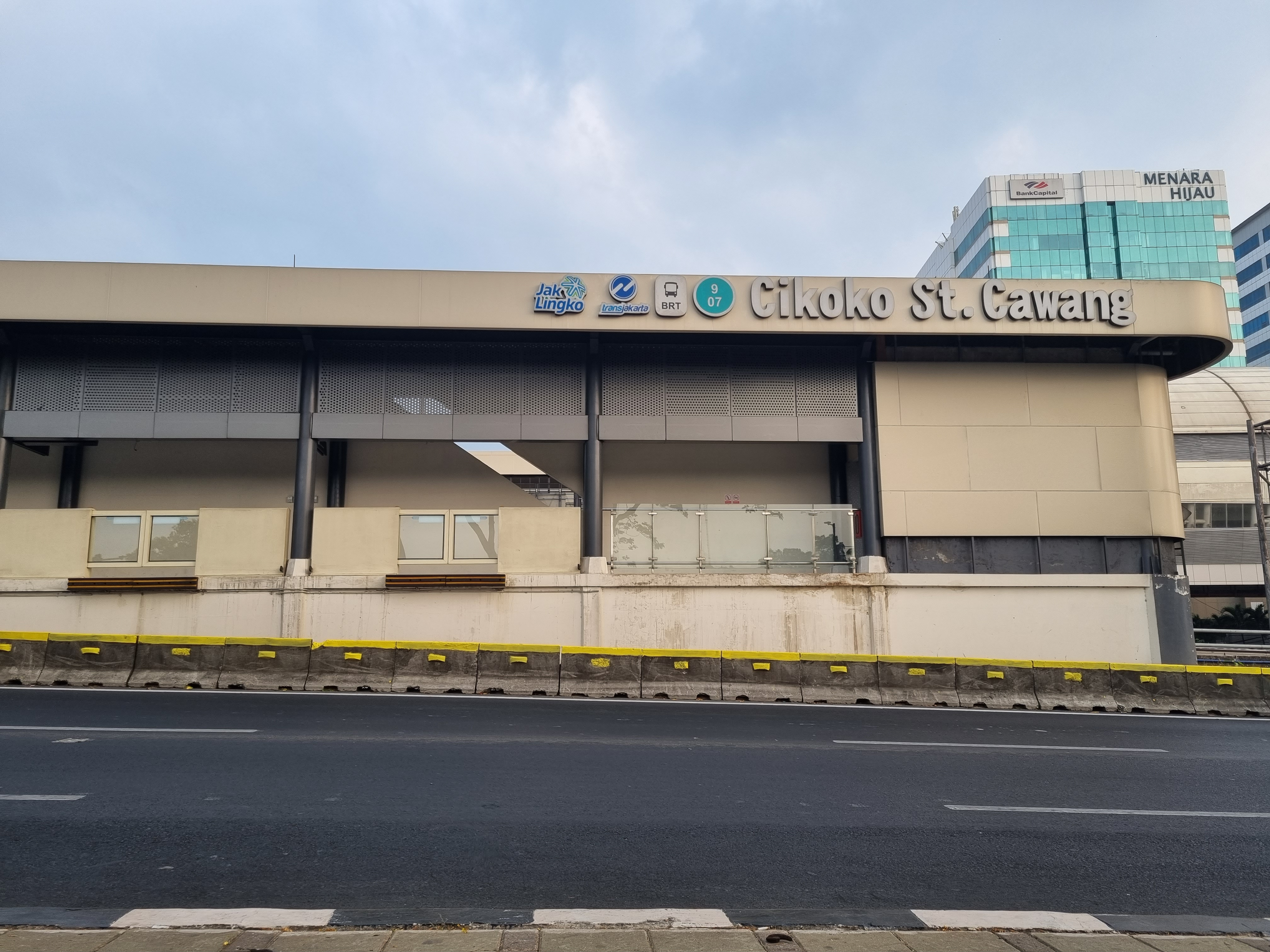
- The north building that serves eastbound buses

General information
- Location: Letjen M.T. Haryono Street, Cikoko, Pancoran, South Jakarta 12770, Indonesia
- Coordinates: 6.2433161°S 106.8578875°E
- System: Transjakarta bus rapid transit station
- Owner: Transjakarta
- Operator: Transjakarta
- Lines: List of TransJakarta corridors#Corridor 9 List of TransJakarta corridors#Cross-corridor routes
- Platforms: Two side platforms connected with a linkway with separate paid area each platform
- Connections: Cawang; Cikoko

Construction
- Structure type: At-grade

Other information
- Status: In service

History
- Opened: 31 December 2010
- Rebuilt: 17 February 2023; 3 years ago
- Former names: Cikoko Stasiun Cawang

Services
Preceding		Following
Ciliwung towards Pinang Ranti	Corridor 9	Tebet Eco Park towards Pluit
Ciliwung towards Cililitan	Corridor 9 Route 9A	Tebet Eco Park towards Grogol Reformasi
Ciliwung towards Pinang Ranti	Corridor 9 Route 9C	Tebet Eco Park towards Bundaran Senayan
Location

Cikoko is a Transjakarta bus rapid transit station located at Jalan Letjen M.T. Haryono in Cikoko, Pancoran, South Jakarta, Indonesia, which primarily serves corridor 9. It is built over a viaduct and located adjacent with Cawang railway station to the north.

== Building and layout ==
The station underwent a revitalization from 15 April 2022 to 17 February 2023, in order to form an integrated transit-oriented development zone between Cawang railway station and Cikoko LRT station. The building is divided between the north and south sides by the Jakarta Inner Ring Road, interconnected by a footbridge.

Prior to revitalization, both buildings were disconnected each other, as the bridges were only built to pass over the regular M.T. Haryono street to access each buildings. Thus, passengers whom wanted to change direction had to pass through a street below the viaduct. A wide interconnection bridge between north and south buildings was eventually built over the toll road during the revitalization process. However, passengers still have to exit paid area to change direction, due to the lack of a separated paid area in the bridge.

The new buildings of Cikoko BRT station have two floors; the upper is the concourse and the lower for the platform area. Each buildings have six platform bays.

North	to Pinang Ranti and to Cililitan (Ciliwung) →
	Side platform, the doors are opened on the right side of the direction of travel
	Jakarta Inner Ring Road →	(To Bekasi/Bogor) →
← (To Soekarno–Hatta Airport/Tangerang)	← Jakarta Inner Ring Road
	Side platform, the doors are opened on the right side of the direction of travel
South	← (Tebet Eco Park) to Pluit, to Grogol Reformasi and to Bundaran Senayan

== Non-BRT bus services ==
Type	Route	Destination	Notes
Transjakarta city bus		Pulo Gadung–Kejaksaan Agung	Inside the station
Transjakarta city bus		TMII–Tegal Parang	Inside the station
Transjakarta city bus		Cibubur → Pluit	Inside the station
Mikrotrans Jak Lingko	JAK-43B	Cililitan–Tongtek via Tebet Eco Park	Outside the station
Mikrotrans Jak Lingko	JAK-43C	Cawang Station–Sarana Jaya via Tebet Eco Park	Outside the station

== Places nearby ==
- Menara Hijau
- Jakarta Regional Office of the Audit Board of Indonesia

== Incidents ==
- Cikoko BRT station have experienced two glass wall shooting incidents by unknown persons:
  - On 9 August 2013, glass walls of both station buildings, as well as the adjacent Cawang Ciliwung (now Ciliwung) station, were crannied by being shot. The culprits were seen driving a car and shot the glass walls around 00:20 local time.
  - On 22 October 2016, a second shooting occurred. This time, the glass walls of the south building for westbound buses were shot, and the culprits were seen driving a motorcycle. The north building was also being shot in the next day at 02:20.
- On 23 February 2016, a police officer from Jakarta's Police Department died after falling from the motorcycle while trespassing the restricted BRT lane near Cikoko BRT station. The victim suffered serious wound in the front head.

== Gallery ==
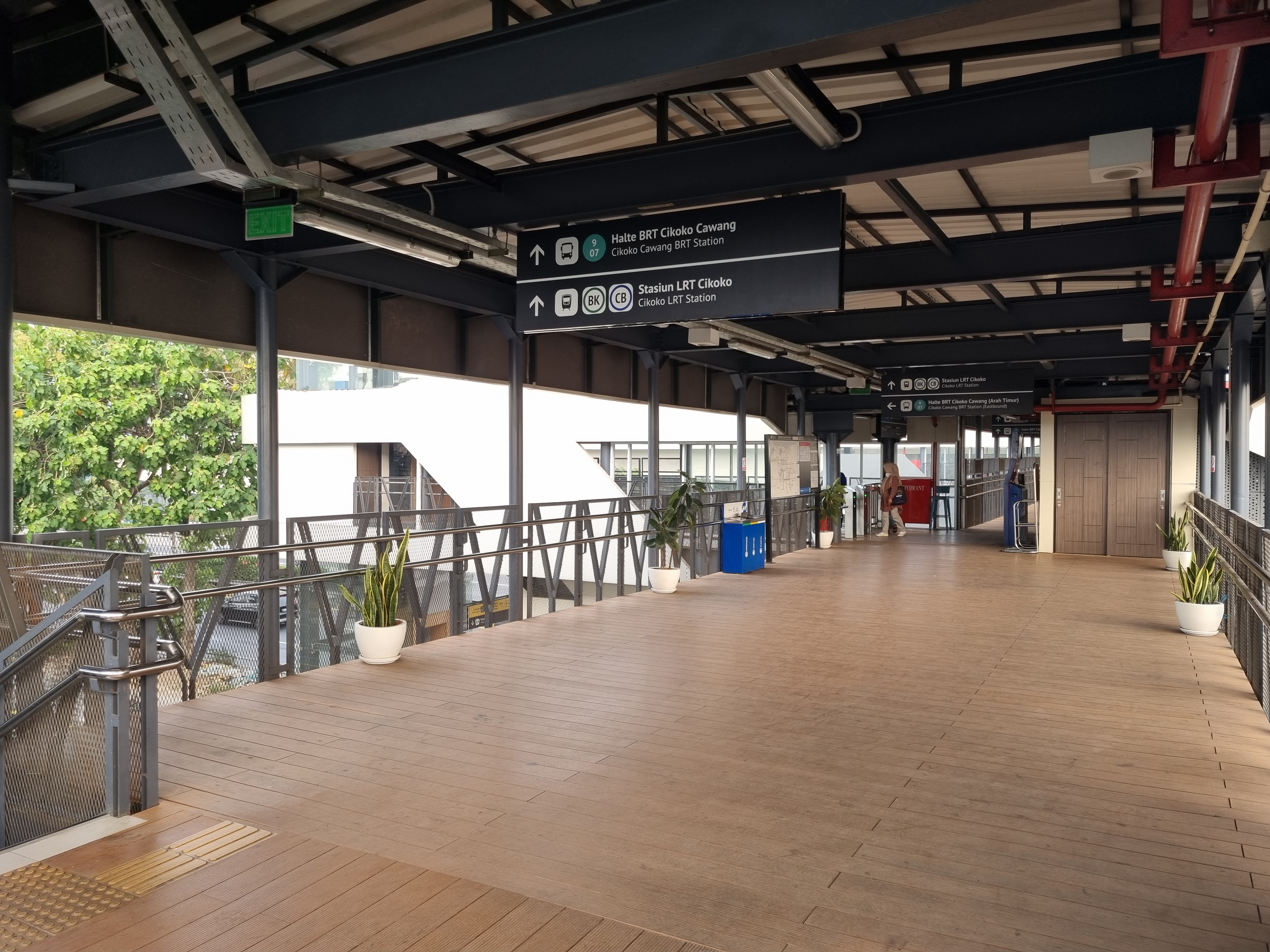
The footbridge that connects both sides of the station building, passing over the Jakarta Inner Ring Road

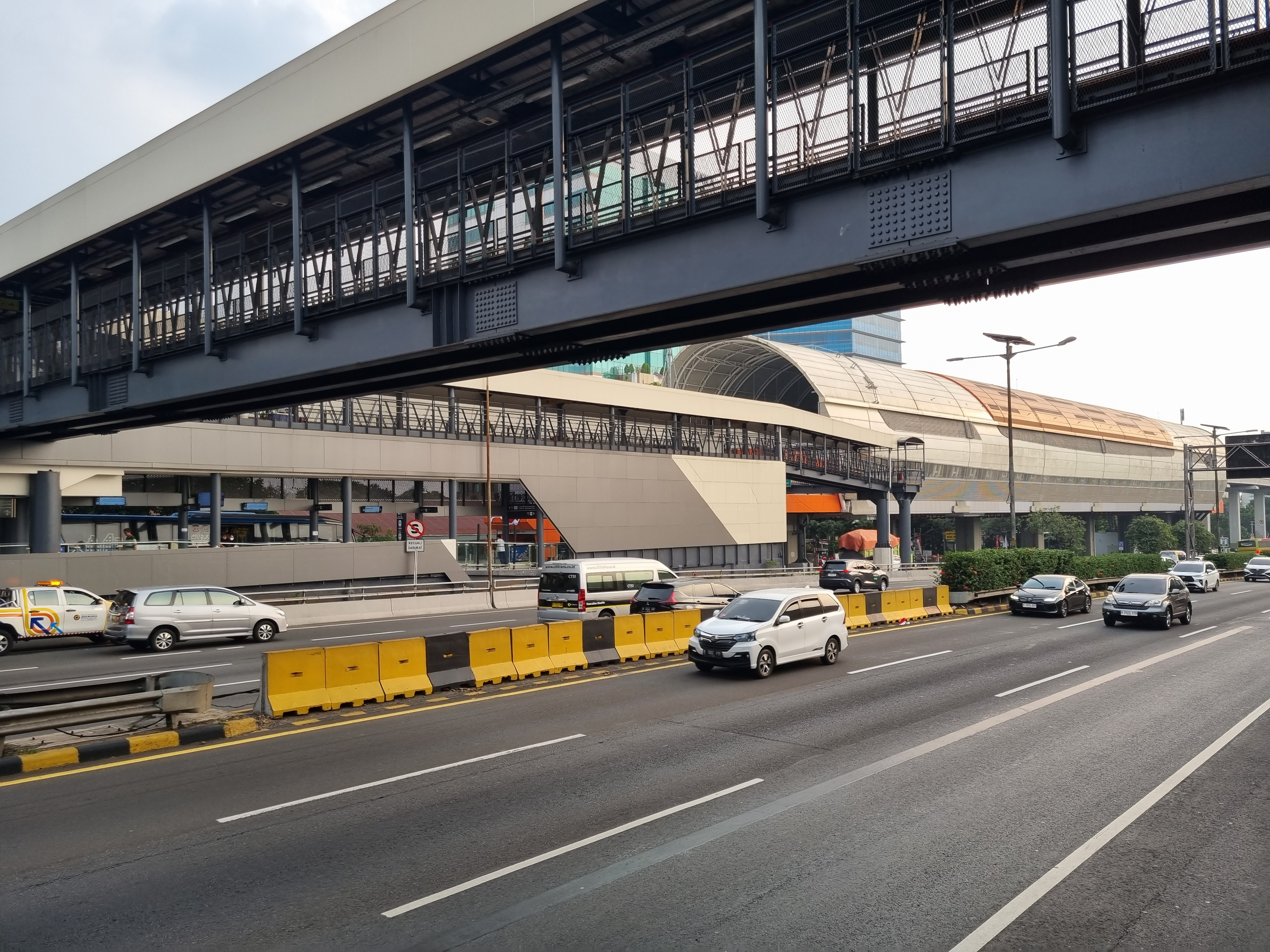
The south building, with the Cikoko LRT station on the background

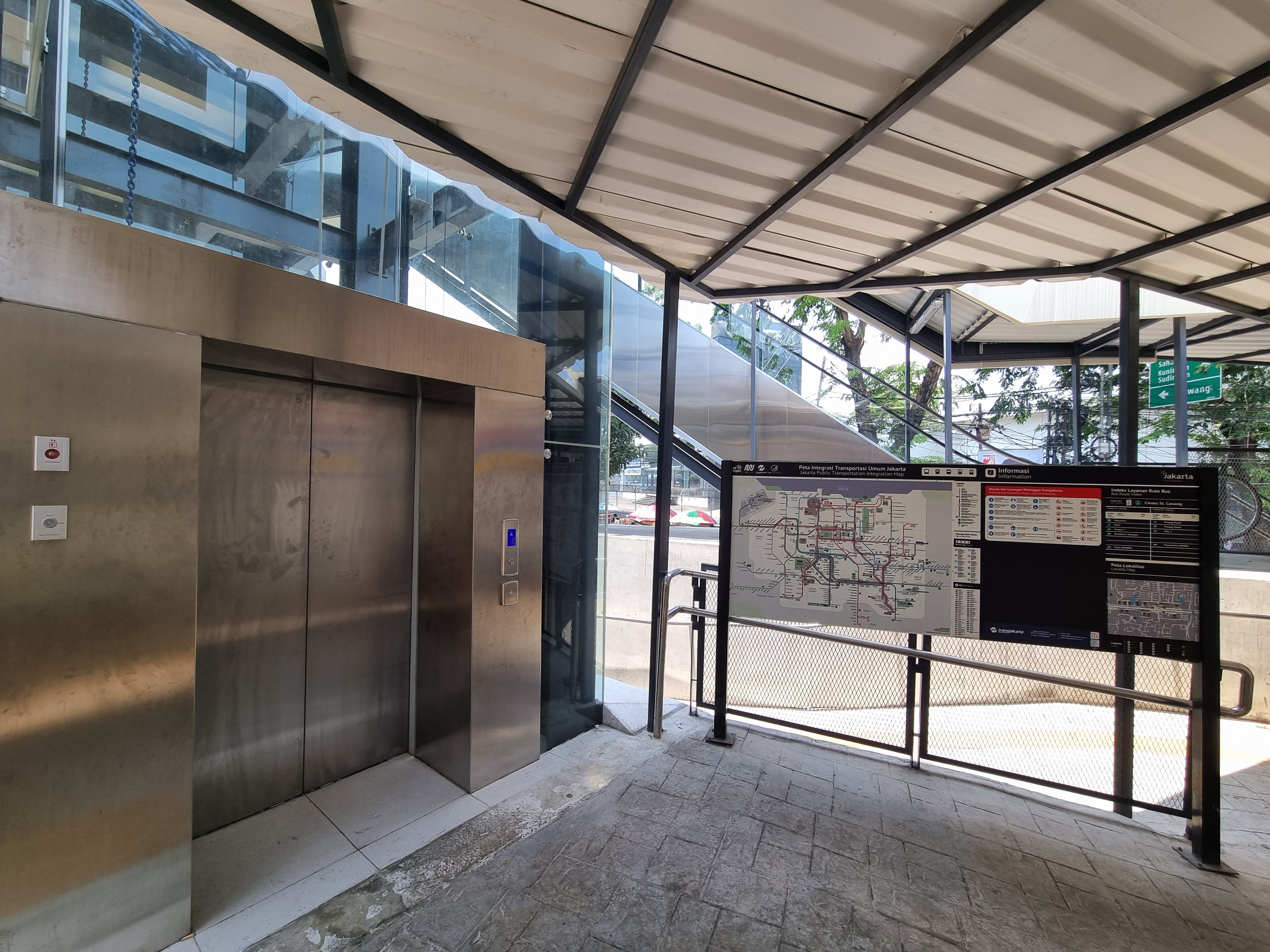
An elevator on the sidewalk to access the station

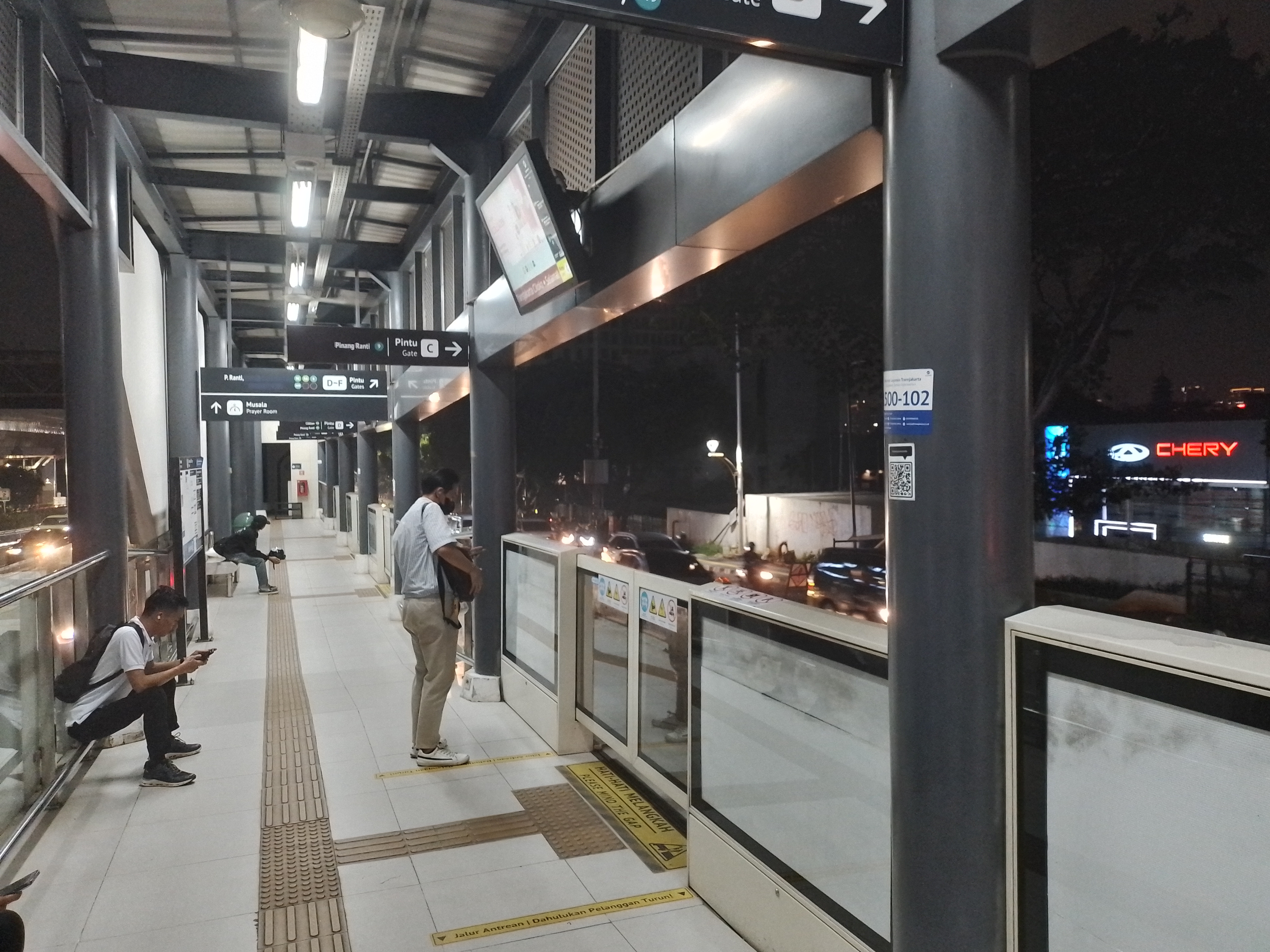
Platform of the north building towards Pinang Ranti
