= Tebet =

Tebet may refer to:

- Ṭebet, a month in the Hebrew calendar
- Tebet, South Jakarta in Indonesia
- David Tebet (1913–2005), American theater publicist, network executive, and press agent
- Ramez Tebet (1936–2006), Brazilian politician
- Simone Tebet (born 1970), Brazilian politician

== See also ==
- Tibet (disambiguation)
