= Tebet railway station =

Railway station in Indonesia

B10 Tebet Station Stasiun Tebet
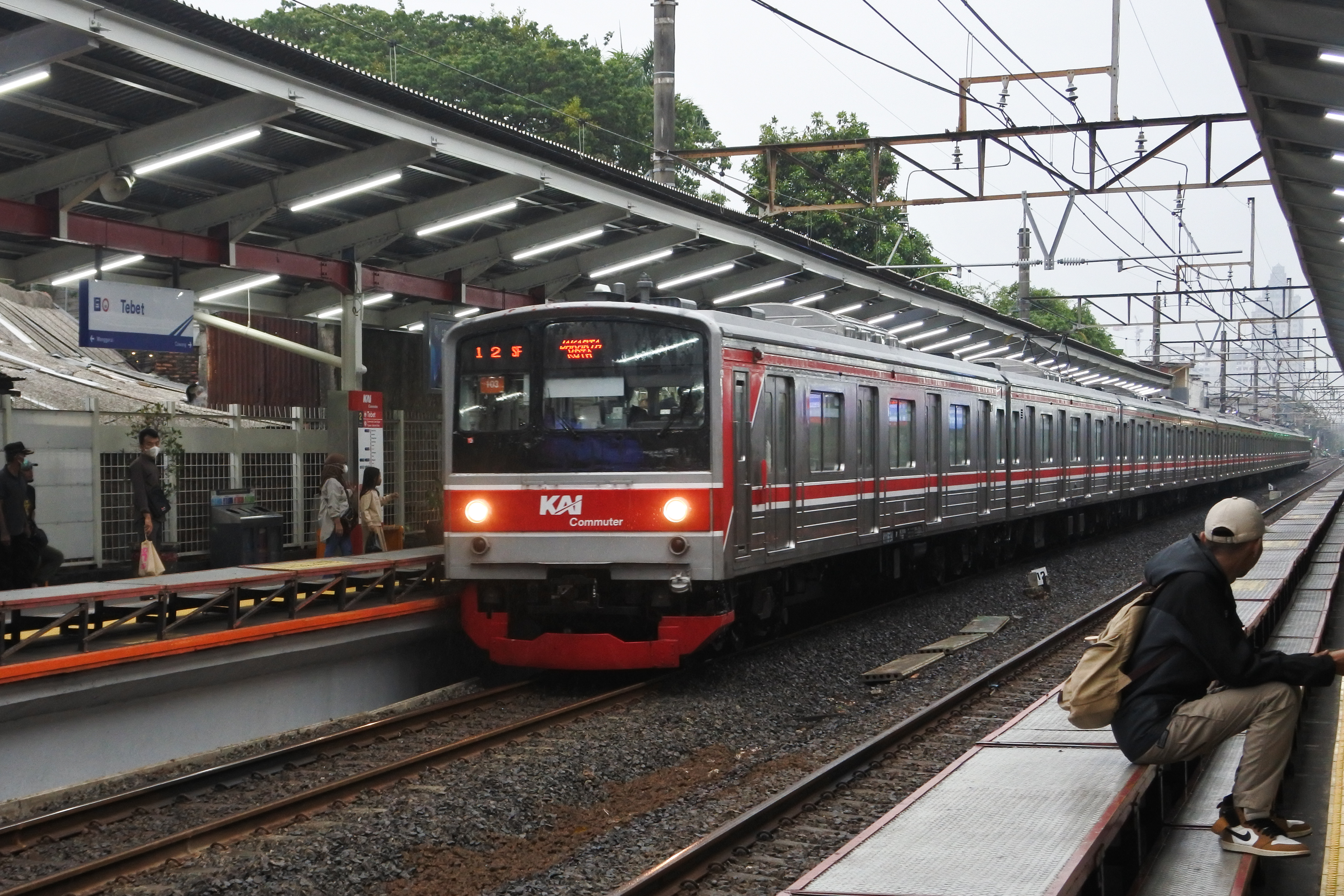
- KRL Commuterline train arriving at Tebet Station, 2024

General information
- Location: Jalan Tebet Raya, Tebet Timur, Tebet, South Jakarta 12820, Jakarta, Indonesia
- Elevation: +17m
- Owner: Kereta Api Indonesia
- Operator: KAI Commuter
- Manager: Kereta Api Indonesia; KAI Commuter
- Line: Bogor Line
- Platforms: 2 side platforms
- Tracks: 2

Construction
- Cycle facilities: Bicycle parking
- Accessible: Available

Other information
- Station code: TEB
- Classification: II

Services
Preceding station		Following station
Manggarai towards Jakarta Kota	Commuter Line Bogor	Cawang towards Bogor or Nambo
Location

Tebet Station (TEB) is a class II railway station located at the Tebet Raya street on the borderline between Kebon Baru and Tebet Timur administrative villages (kelurahan), Tebet, South Jakarta, Jakarta, Indonesia. The station, which is located +17m only serves KRL Commuterline services. It is in a strategic location, because it becomes the feeder station for workers in Casablanca, Kuningan, Kampung Melayu, and the surrounding area that makes the station as one of the busiest stations in Jakarta.

Tebet Station is considered to be crowded in the morning and evening when people leave and return from work. In the past, many hawkers take the passenger area to wait for the train. Since the station is crowded, this area is prone to crime though there is a police station to the south of the station. The front side of the station is a source of traffic jams, because mikrolets, Kopaja buses, bajaj, and motorcycle taxis (ojek) scramble to get passengers when the KRL stops to pick up and drop off passengers.

The current atmosphere of the station is more orderly, as there has been restoration at the front of the station counter and the closure of the Abdullah Syafii road on the north side of the station.

Further arrangements were made in 2020-2021 to strengthen intermodal integration (with Transjakarta and other modes such as mikrolet and motorcycle taxis) and facilitate pedestrian access. Inaugurated on 29 September 2021, this arrangement was carried out by PT Moda Integrasi Transportasi Jakarta, a joint venture between Jakarta MRT and KAI.

== Station layout ==
This station has two railway tracks.

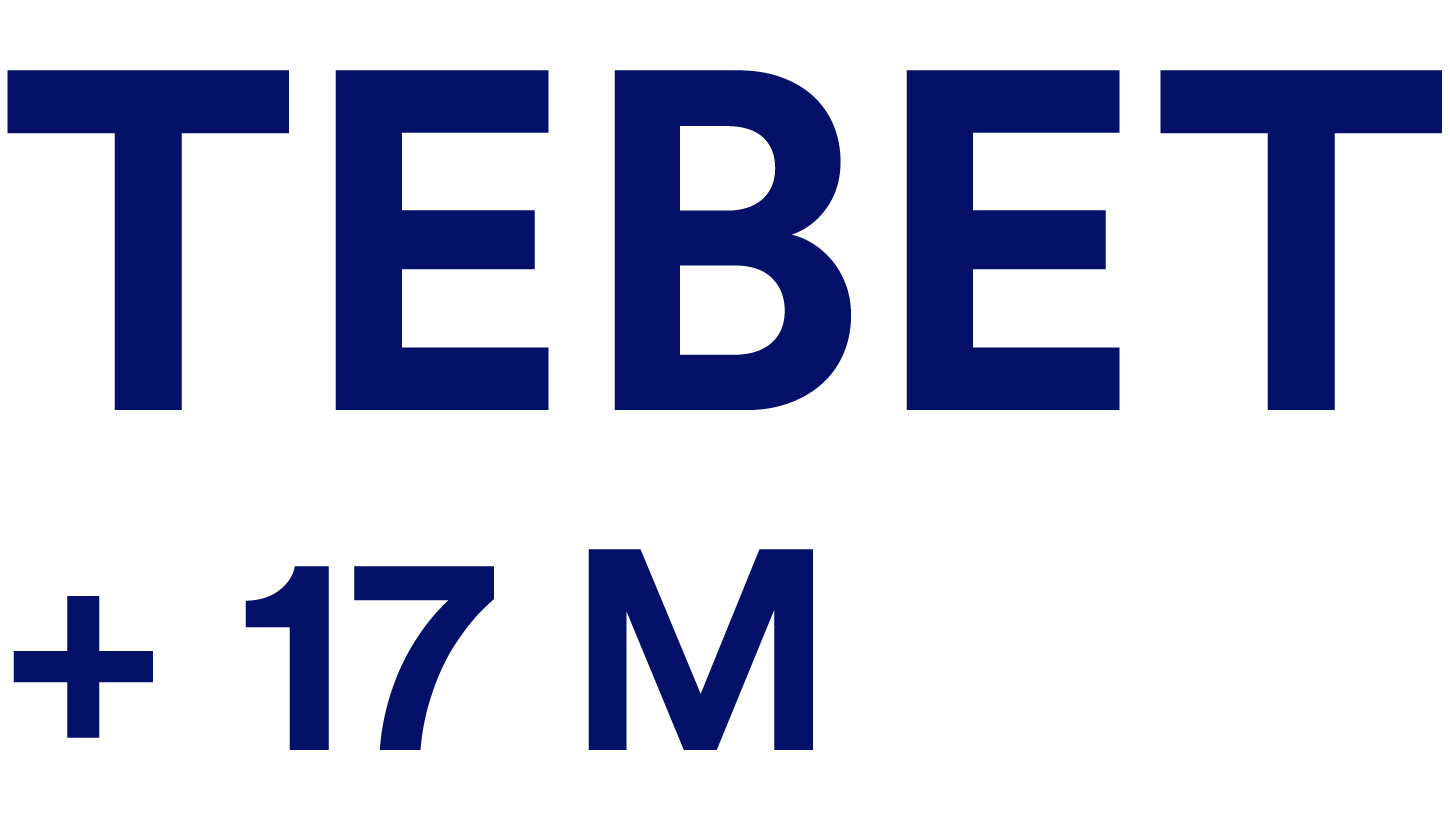
B10
Platform floor	Side platform, the doors are opened on the right side	
Platform floor	Line 2	← (Manggarai) Bogor Line to Jakarta Kota
Platform floor	Line 1	Bogor Line to Bogor or Nambo (Cawang) →
Platform floor	Side platform, the doors are opened on the right side	
G	Main building	

== Services ==
=== Passenger services ===
==== KRL Commuterline ====
Train line name	Destination	Notes
Bogor Line	Jakarta Kota	-
Bogor Line	Bogor	-
Bogor Line	Nambo	Only a few trips

== Supporting transportation ==
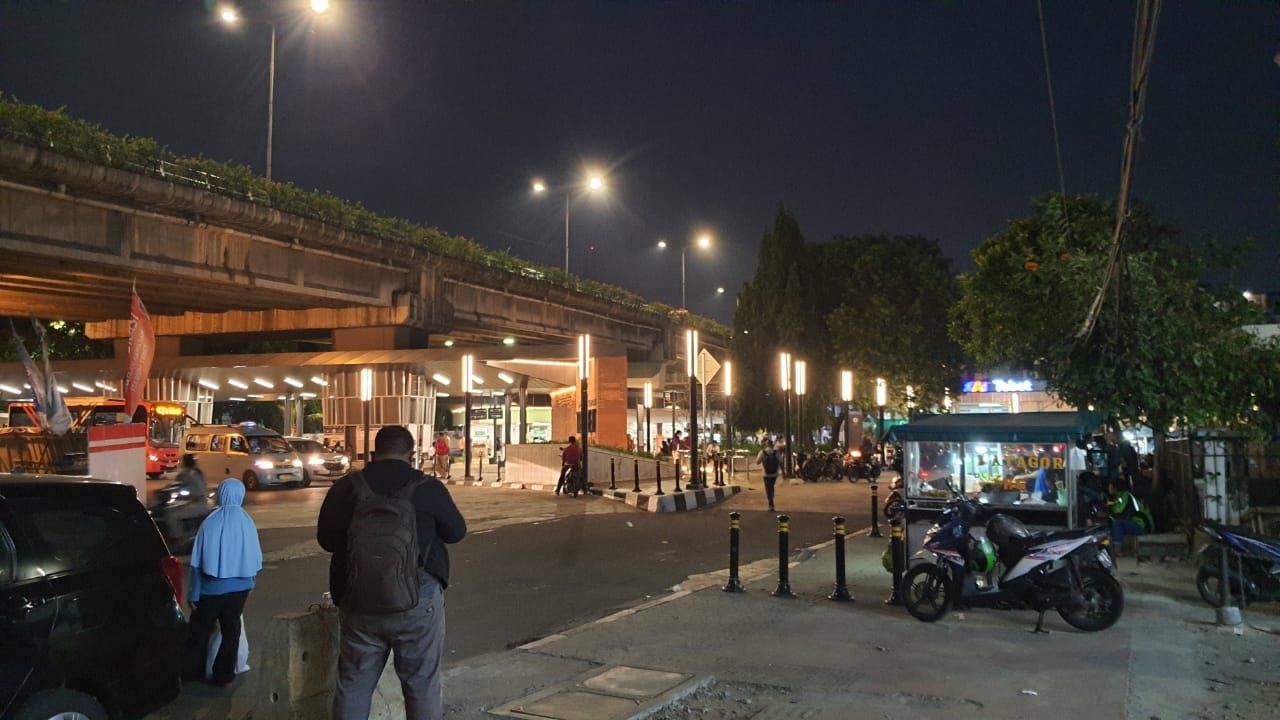
The integration shelter (halte integrasi) on the west gate of the station

The west entrance of Tebet Station has been rearranged and overhauled in order to redevelop the station and its surrounding area into an integrated transit-oriented development. An integration shelter (halte integrasi) is built on the west gate of the station to create a public transportation intermodal integration, such as TransJakarta, Mikrolet, auto-rickshaws (bajaj), and motorcycle taxis (ojek).

Type	Route	Destination
TransJakarta	5B (non-BRT)	Tebet Station–BNN
TransJakarta	5F (non-BRT)	Kampung Melayu–Tanah Abang Station
TransJakarta	6C (non-BRT)	Tebet Station–Departemen Kesehatan via Rasuna Said
TransJakarta	6D (MetroTrans EV)	Tebet Station–Bundaran Senayan via Prof. Dr. Satrio
TransJakarta	JAK-18 (MikroTrans Jak Lingko)	Duren Kalibata Station–Guntur
TransJakarta	JAK-43B (MikroTrans Jak Lingko)	PGC– Tongtek Bidara Cina via Tebet Eco Park
JR Connexion (Perum DAMRI)	x9	Tebet Station–Bogor Station
Mikrolet	JS02A	Kampung Melayu–Duren Kalibata Station
Mikrolet	JS03	Duren Kalibata Station–Bukit Duri
Mikrolet	M44	Kampung Melayu–Karet Tengsin

== Incidents ==
- On 9 February 2008 at 17:00, a tree fell at Tebet Station due to a rainstorm that flushed parts of Jakarta. As a result of this incident, several KRL trains could not pass the station until 19.00.

Preceding station	Kereta Api Indonesia	Following station
Manggarai; Terminus	Manggarai–Padalarang	Cawang towards Padalarang
