= Tibet Area =

Tibet Area may refer to:

- Tibet, an ethno-cultural region in Asia
- The Tibetan Plateau, a geographical region in Asia
- The Tibet Area (administrative division) (Chinese:西藏地方), a former administrative area of the Republic of China and the People's Republic of China
- The Tibet Autonomous Region of the People's Republic of China

== See also ==
- Tibet (disambiguation)
