= Tibetan =

Tibetan may mean:

- of, from, or related to Tibet
- Tibetan people, an ethnic group
- Tibetan language:
  - Classical Tibetan, the classical language used also as a contemporary written standard
  - Standard Tibetan, the most widely used spoken dialect
  - Tibetan pinyin, a method of writing Standard Tibetan in Latin script
  - Tibetan script
  - any other of the Tibetic languages

Tibetan may additionally refer to:

== Culture ==
- Old Tibetan, an era of Tibetan history
- Tibetan art
- Music of Tibet
- Tibetan rug
- Tibetan culture
- Tibetan cuisine

== Religion ==
- Tibetan Buddhism
- Tibetan Muslims

== Other uses ==
- Tibetan alphabet
- Tibetan (Unicode block)
- Tibetan name
- Tibetan calendar
- Tibetan Spaniel, a breed of dog
- Tibetan Mastiff, a breed of dog

== See also ==
- Tibet (disambiguation)
- Tibetan Bells (disambiguation)
- Traditional Tibetan medicine
- Tibetan language (disambiguation)
