= Cawang railway station =

Railway station in Indonesia

B11 Cawang Station Stasiun Cawang
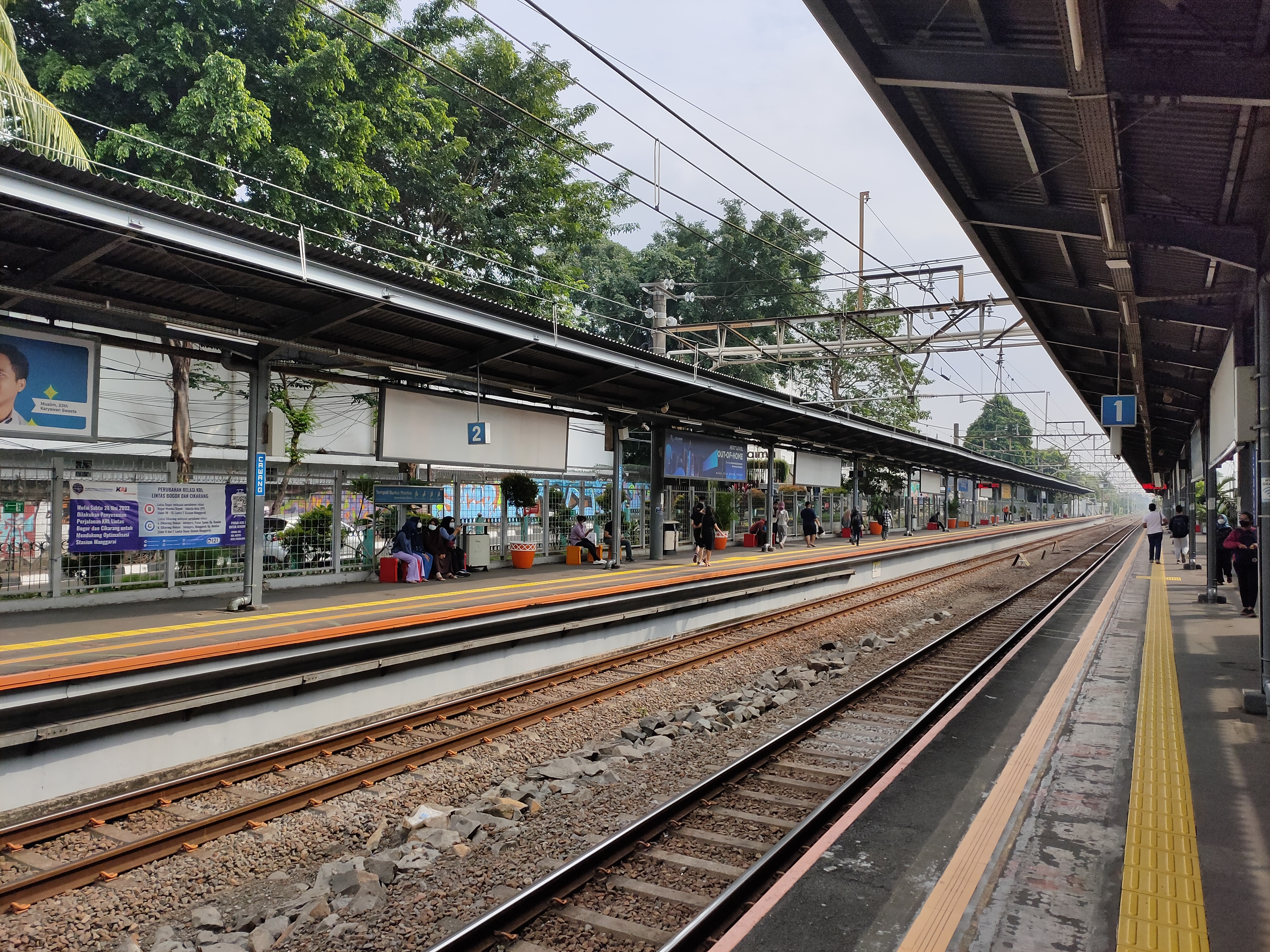
- Cawang Station platform, 2022

General information
- Location: Jl. Tebet Timur Dalam 11, East Tebet, Tebet, South Jakarta; Jakarta; Indonesia
- Coordinates: 6°14′31″S 106°51′29″E
- Elevation: +26 m (85 ft)
- System: Commuter line station
- Owner: Kereta Api Indonesia
- Operator: KAI Commuter
- Lines: Manggarai–Padalarang railway; Bogor Line
- Platforms: 2 side platforms
- Tracks: 2
- Connections: Cikoko; Cikoko

Construction
- Parking: Unavailable
- Accessible: Available

Other information
- Station code: CW
- Classification: Class II

Services
Preceding station		Following station
Tebet towards Jakarta Kota	Commuter Line Bogor	Duren Kalibata towards Bogor or Nambo
Location
- Location within Jakarta

Cawang Station (CW) is a class II railway station located at Jl. Tebet Timur Dalam 11, East Tebet, Tebet, South Jakarta, Indonesia. The station, which is located at the altitude of +26 meters, is included in Operational Area I Jakarta of Kereta Api Indonesia and only serves the KRL Commuterline route. Part of the station is located below Jakarta Inner Ring Road and M.T. Haryono street.

Although named as Cawang, administratively the station is not located in Cawang, Kramat Jati, East Jakarta, but is located some distance to the west of the subdistrict, and borders with Kebon Baru, Tebet, South Jakarta at its east. Despite sharing the same name, the KRL station is not to be confused with the unrelated Cawang LRT station on the Jabodebek LRT, which is actually located in Cawang District. Instead, this station interchanges with the Jabodebek LRT at Cikoko LRT station.

== Building and layout ==
This station has two railway tracks, where both tracks are straight tracks. Cawang Station has connection with Cikoko Transjakarta bus station which serves corridor 9 and Cikoko LRT station of the Jabodebek LRT via short walk.

B11
G	Main building	
Platform floor	Side platform, the doors are opened on the right side	
Platform floor	Line 1	← (Tebet) Bogor Line to Jakarta Kota
Platform floor	Line 2	Bogor Line to Bogor or Nambo (Duren Kalibata) →
Platform floor	Side platform, the doors are opened on the right side	
G	Main building	

== Services ==
The following is a list of train services at Cawang Station.

=== Passenger services ===
- KAI Commuter
  - Bogor Line, to Jakarta Kota and Bogor
  - Bogor Line (Nambo branch), to Jakarta Kota and Nambo

== Supporting transportation ==
Public transport type	Station	Line	Destination
Jabodebek LRT	Cikoko	LRT Line 1 (Greater Jakarta LRT)	Dukuh Atas BNI–Harjamukti
Jabodebek LRT	Cikoko	LRT Line 3 (Greater Jakarta LRT)	Dukuh Atas BNI–Jati Mulya
Transjakarta	Cikoko	List of TransJakarta corridors#Corridor 9	Pinang Ranti–Pluit
Transjakarta	Cikoko	List of TransJakarta corridors#Cross-corridor routes	PGC–Kali Grogol
Transjakarta	Cikoko	List of TransJakarta corridors#Cross-corridor routes	Pinang Ranti–Bundaran Senayan
Transjakarta	N/A	JAK 43B (Mikrotrans Jak Lingko)	Pusat Grosir Cililitan–Tongtek Bidara Cina via Tebet Eco Park
Transjabodetabek	N/A	AC119	Kampung Melayu Terminal-Poris Plawad Terminal
Mikrolet	N/A	JS02A	Kampung Melayu-Duren Kalibata Station

== Gallery ==
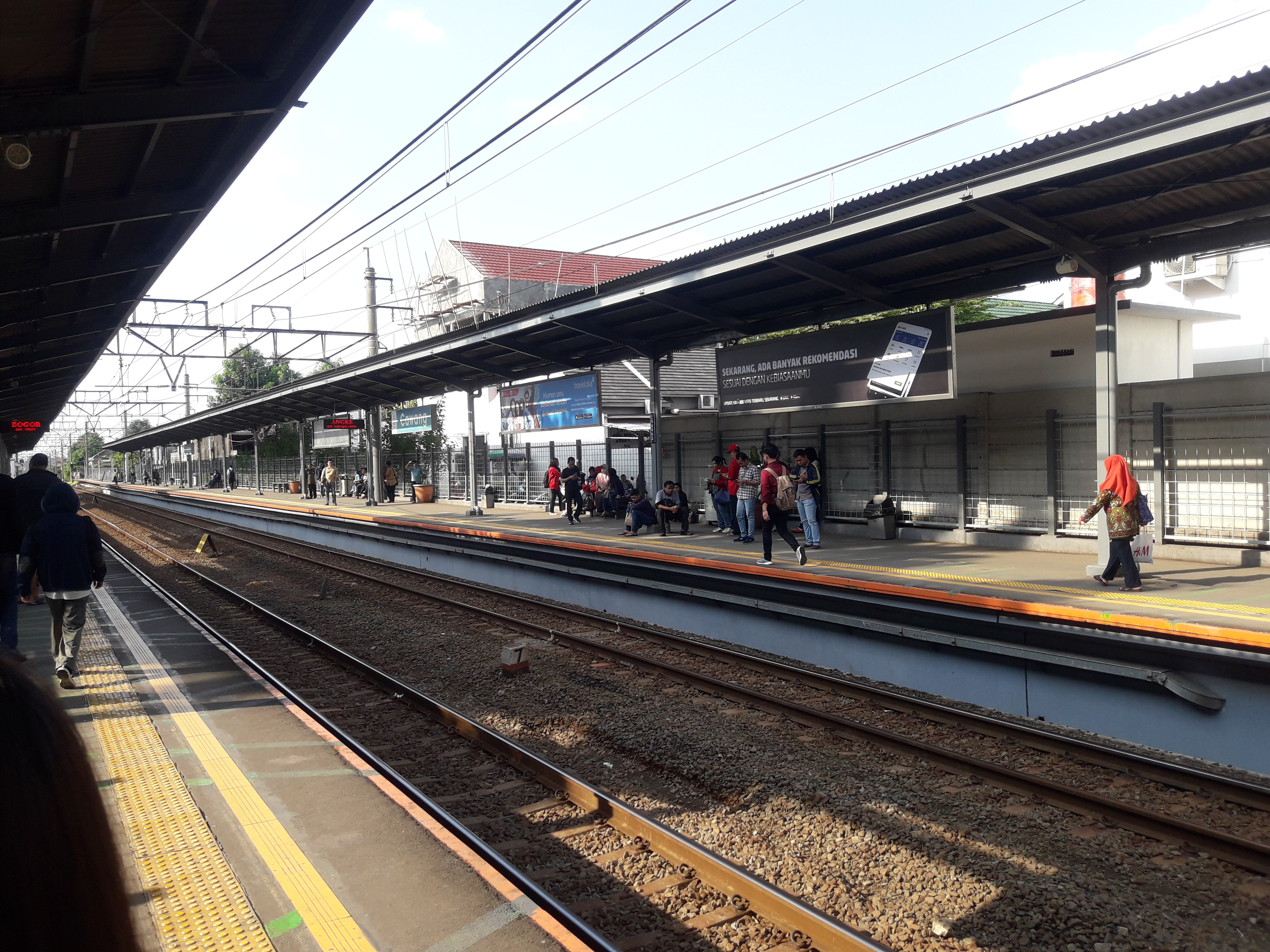
Viewed from the other side, 2018

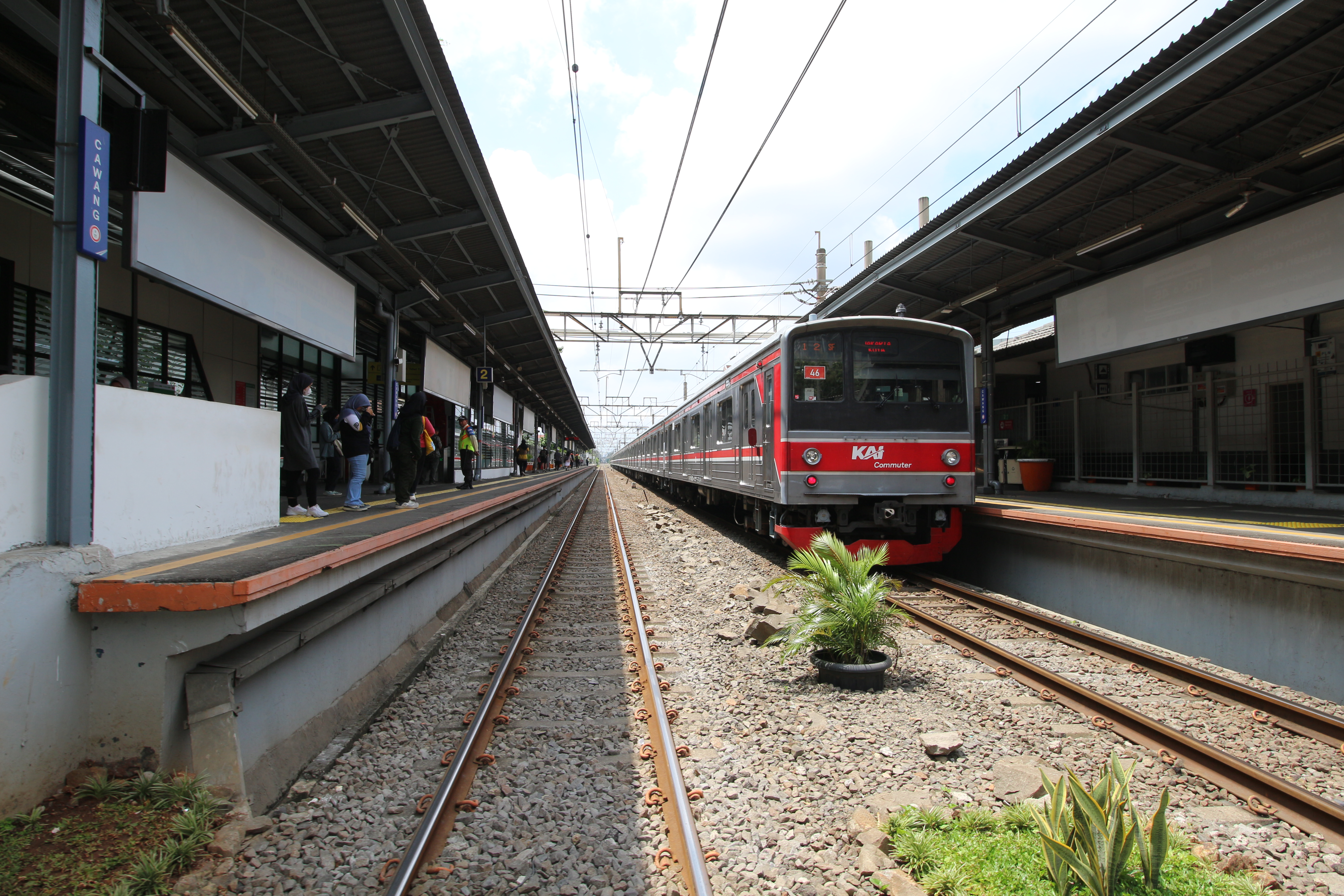
KAI Commuter Bogor Line 205 series bound to Tebet railway station, 2024

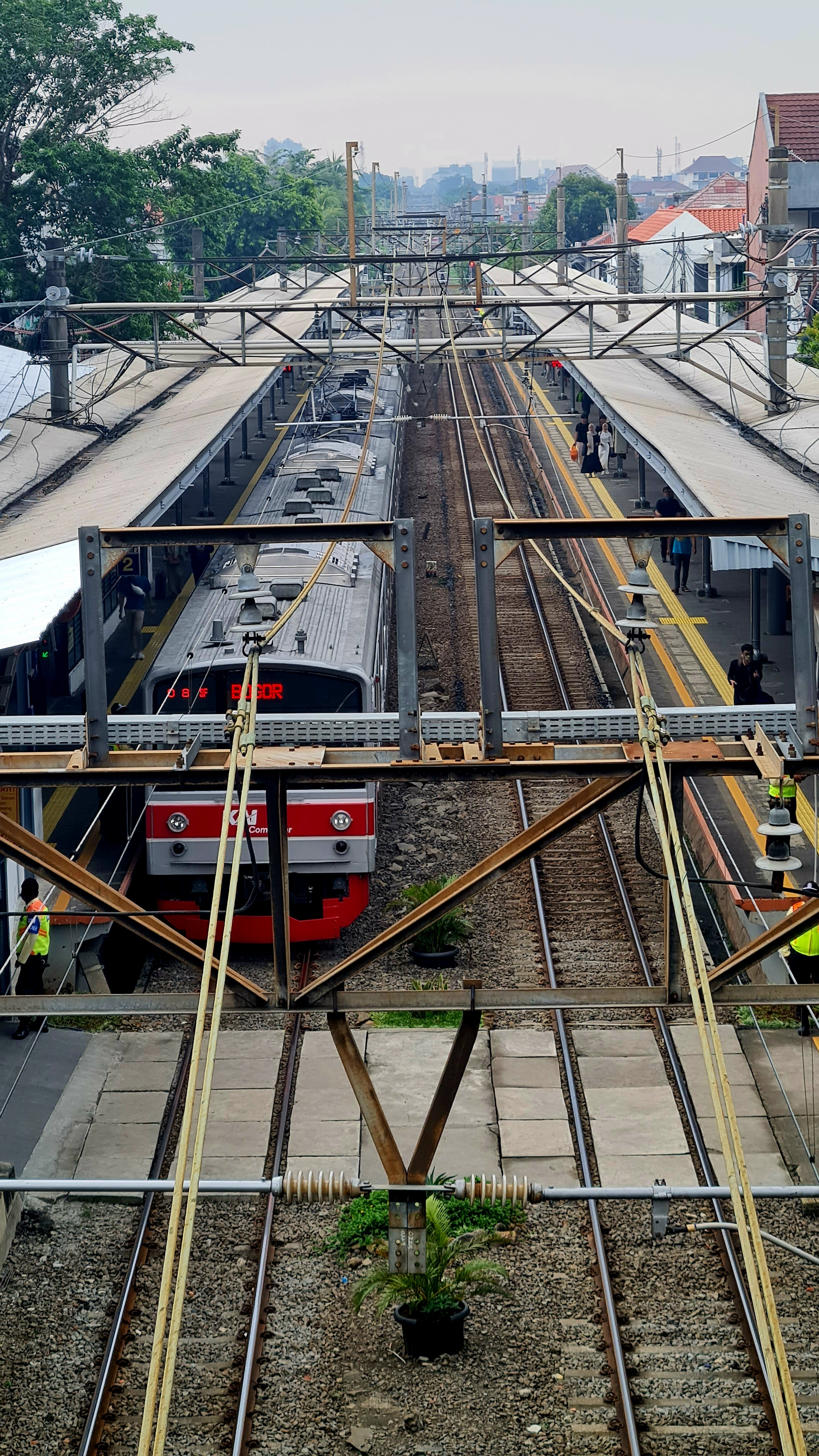
Viewed from M.T. Haryono Street, 2024

Preceding station	Kereta Api Indonesia	Following station
Tebet towards Jakarta Kota	Jakarta Kota–Bogor	Duren Kalibata towards Bogor
