= Pancoran LRT station =

Light rapid transit station in Jakarta, Indonesia

CB05 BK05 Pancoran
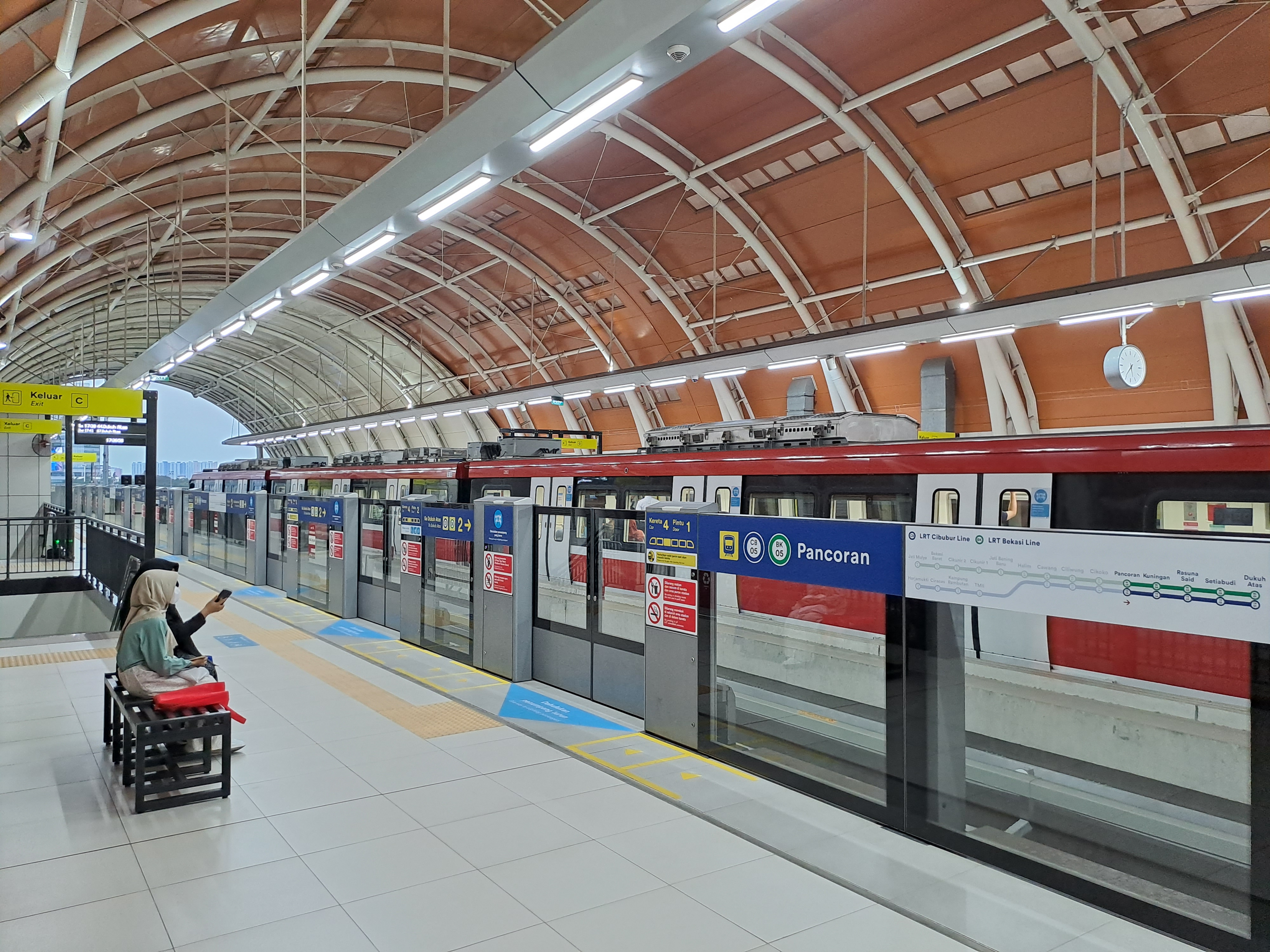
- Platform 2 of the station

General information
- Location: Jalan Gatot Subroto, Pancoran, Pancoran, South Jakarta, Jakarta, Indonesia
- Coordinates: 6.242127211352091°S 106.83846930279944°E
- System: Jabodebek LRT station
- Owner: Ministry of Transportation via the Directorate General of Railways
- Manager: Kereta Api Indonesia
- Lines: Cibubur Line; Bekasi Line
- Platforms: 2 side platforms
- Tracks: 2
- Connections: Pancoran

Construction
- Structure type: Elevated
- Cycle facilities: Bicycle parking
- Accessible: Yes

Other information
- Station code: PAN

History
- Opened: 28 August 2023
- Electrified: 2019

Services
Preceding station		Following station
Kuningan towards Dukuh Atas BNI	Cibubur Line	Cikoko towards Harjamukti
Kuningan towards Dukuh Atas BNI	Bekasi Line	Cikoko towards Jati Mulya
Route map
Location

Pancoran LRT Station is a light rapid transit station located in Jalan Gatot Subroto, Pancoran, Pancoran, South Jakarta, Indonesia. Located at an altitude of +38.510 meters, it serves the Cibubur and Bekasi lines of the Jabodebek LRT system.

== Naming rights ==
As the operator of Jabodebek LRT, Kereta Api Indonesia (KAI) offers the opportunity to bid for naming rights for all Jabodebek LRT stations. This naming right grant includes all naming in station names, network and line maps and diagrams, passenger information system (PIS) announcements, and all media platforms, including Access by KAI app.

As the first naming right bidder for Jabodebek LRT station, PT Bank Pembangunan Daerah Jawa Barat dan Banten Tbk (Bank BJB), a joint regional development bank of West Java and Banten, won the bid for Pancoran LRT Station naming rights. While the change has not been officially announced, passengers have started noticing that all signages have been added "bank bjb" branding, styled with all letters written in lowercase, next to the station name. The rights was ceased in late 2025.

== Station layout ==
2nd floor
Side platform, the doors are opened on the right side
Line 1
← (Cikoko)
Cibubur Line to Harjamukti,

Bekasi Line to Jati Mulya

Line 2

Cibubur Line to Dukuh Atas Bank Syariah Indonesia,

Bekasi Line to Dukuh Atas Bank Syariah Indonesia

(Kuningan) →
Side platform, the doors are opened on the right side
1st floor
Concourse
Ticket counter, ticket vending machines, fare gates, and retail kiosks.
Ground level
Street
Entrance/Exit and access to Pancoran BRT Station

== Services ==
- Cibubur Line
- Bekasi Line

== Supporting transportation ==
Type	Station	Route	Destination
Transjakarta	Pancoran (BRT Station)	List of TransJakarta corridors#Corridor 9	Pinang Ranti–Pluit
Transjakarta	Pancoran (BRT Station)	List of TransJakarta corridors#Cross-corridor routes	Cililitan–Grogol Reformasi
Transjakarta	Pancoran (BRT Station)	List of TransJakarta corridors#Cross-corridor routes	Pinang Ranti–Bundaran Senayan
Transjakarta	Pancoran (BRT Station)	List of TransJakarta corridors#Cross-corridor routes	Puri Beta 2–Pancoran
Transjakarta (Non-BRT)	Pancoran (BRT Station)		Pasar Minggu– Tanah Abang Station
Transjakarta (Non-BRT)	Pancoran (BRT Station, towards Pluit only)		Cibubur Junction–Pluit
Transjakarta (Non-BRT)	Pancoran Barat 1 and Pancoran Barat 2 (Bus stops)		Kampung Melayu–Ragunan
Transjakarta (Non-BRT)	Pancoran Barat 1 and Pancoran Barat 2 (Bus stops)		Pasar Minggu–Cipedak

== Gallery ==
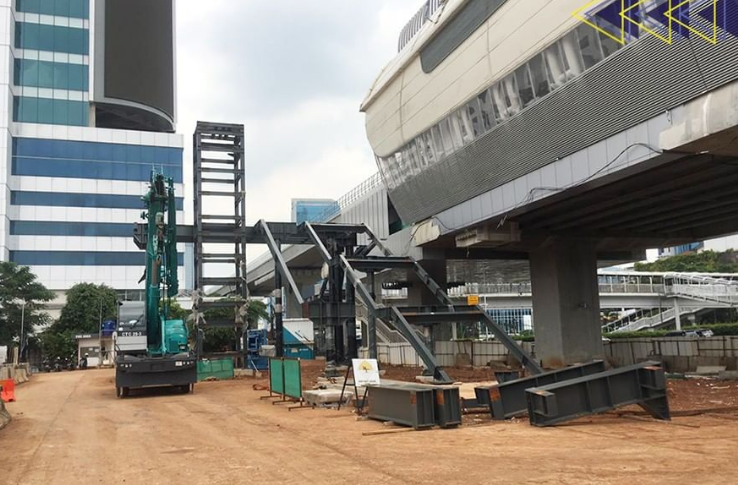
Pancoran LRT Station under construction

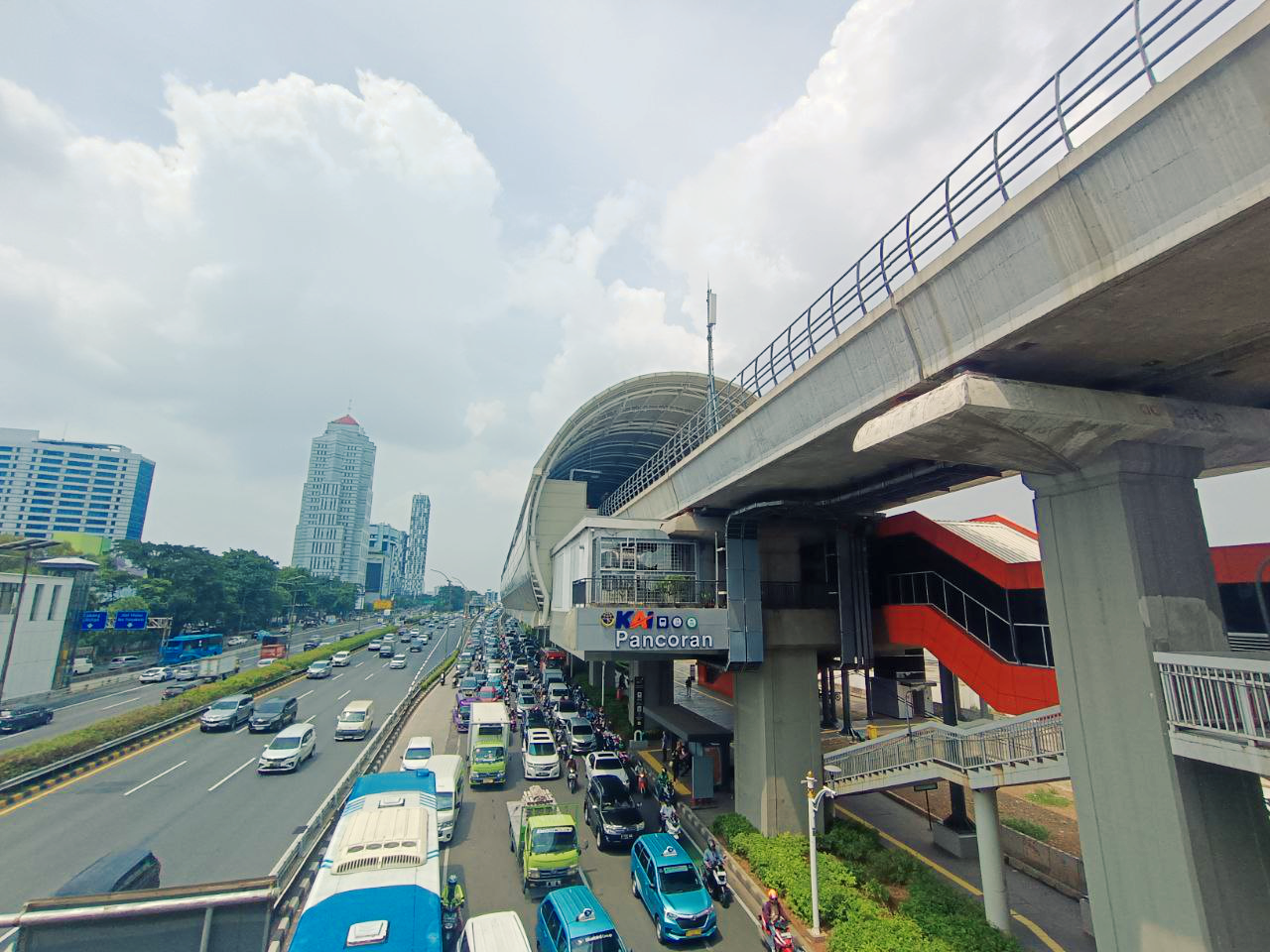
Pancoran LRT Station in April 2024 before naming rights

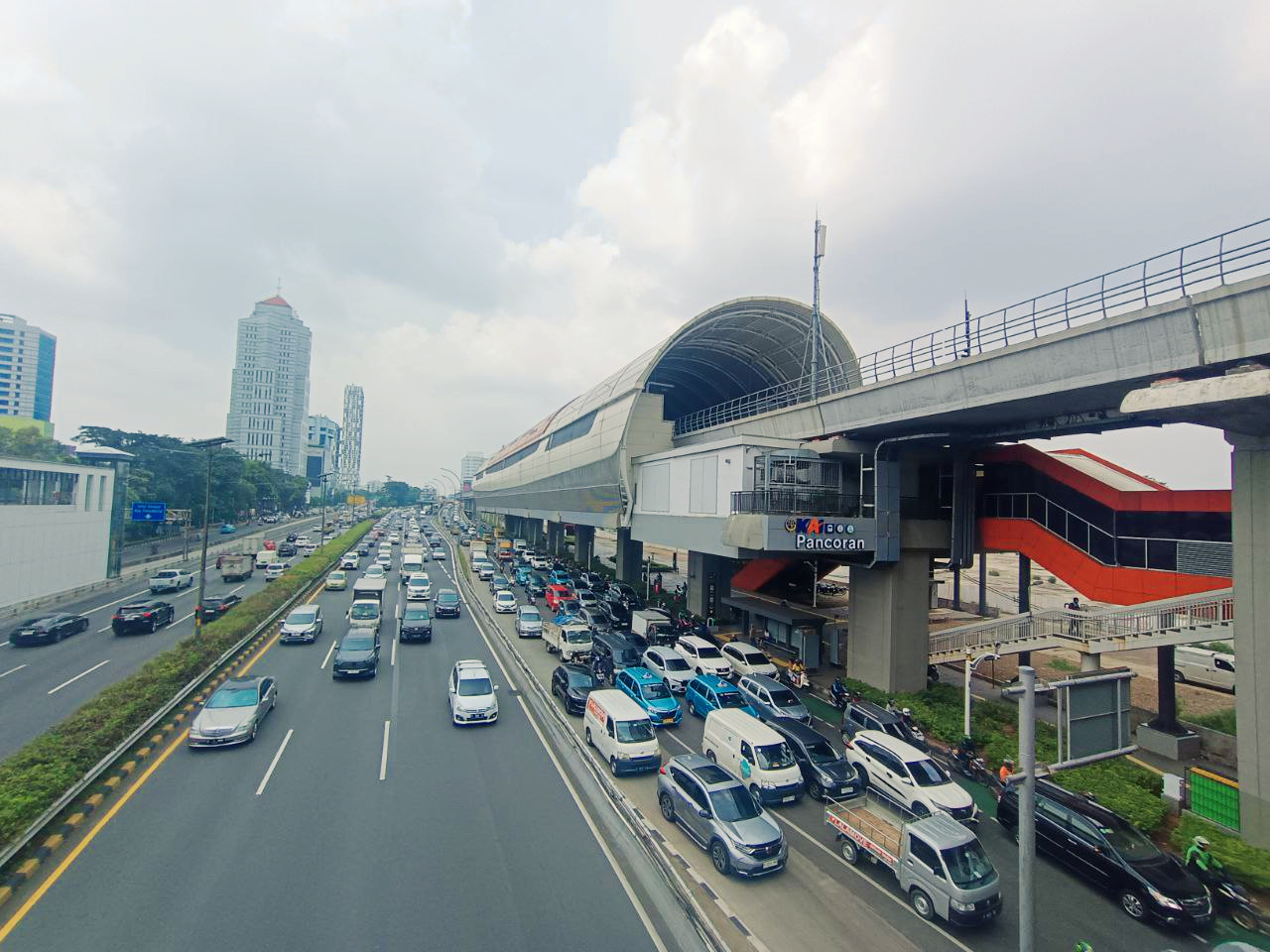
Pancoran LRT Station before naming rights, April 2024

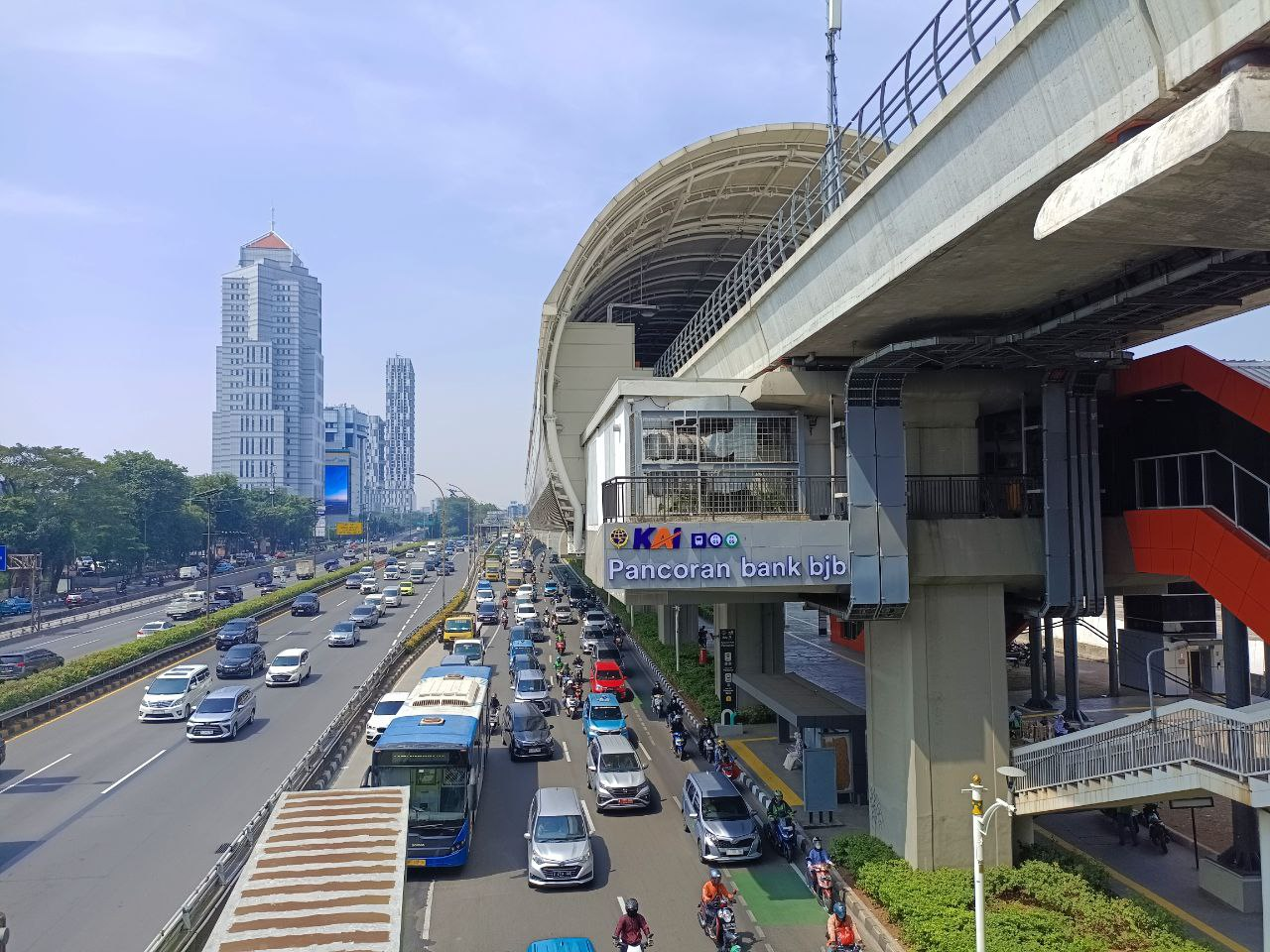
Pancoran bank bjb LRT Station with naming rights afforded, June 2024.
