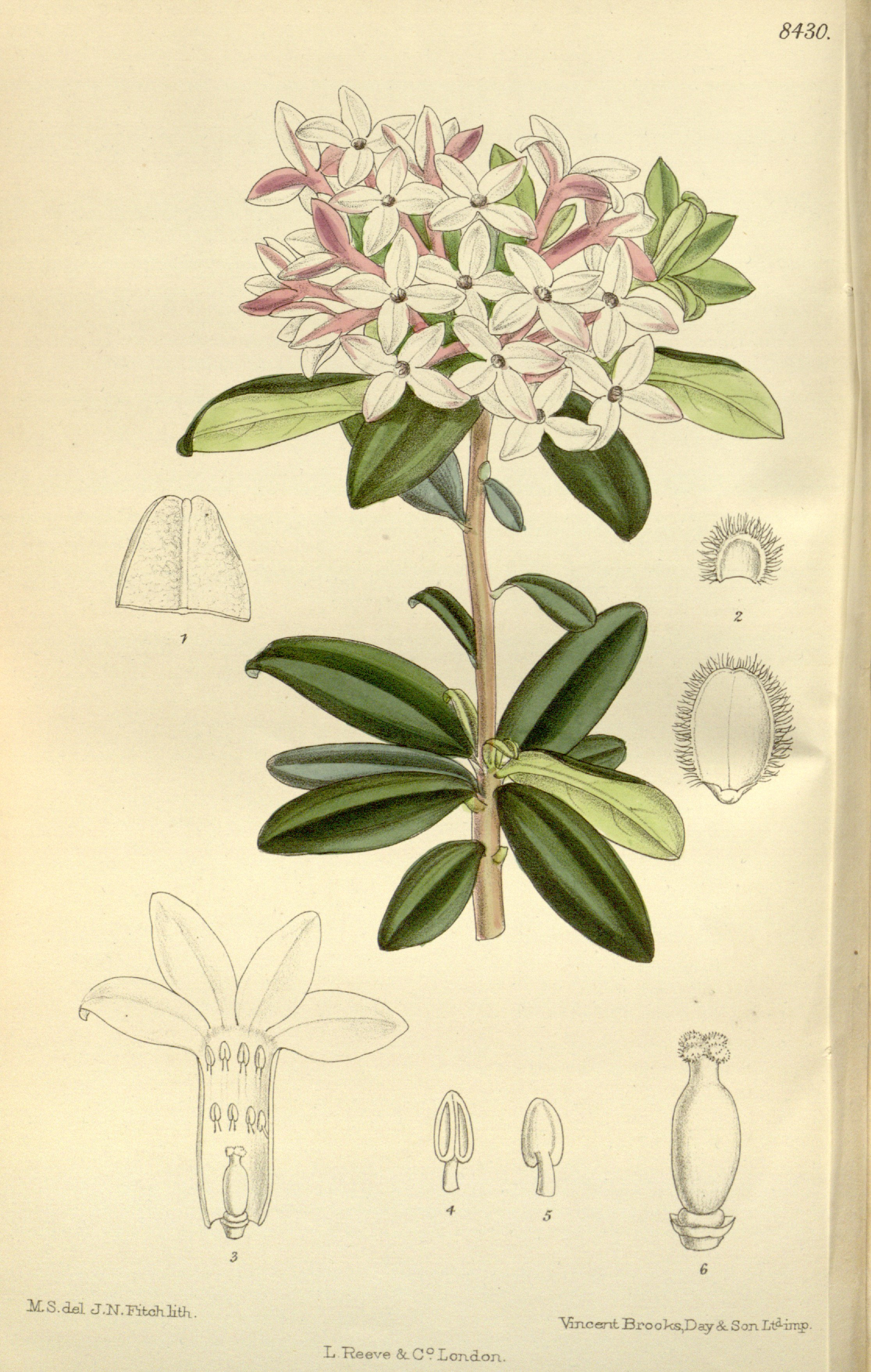

Scientific classification
- Kingdom: Plantae
- Clade: Embryophytes
- Clade: Tracheophytes
- Clade: Spermatophytes
- Clade: Angiosperms
- Clade: Eudicots
- Clade: Rosids
- Order: Malvales
- Family: Thymelaeaceae
- Genus: Daphne
- Species: D. retusa

Binomial name
- Daphne retusa Hemsl.

= Daphne retusa =

Species of plant

Daphne retusa is a species of flowering plant in the family Thymelaeaceae, native from the Himalayas westwards to west and central China and southwards to Myanmar. It was first described in 1892.

== Description ==
Daphne retusa grows at an altitudes around or below 3,900 m. It ranges from about 0.7 to 1.5 m tall. Its leaves are dark green, and it has light pink flowers and bears red fruit.

== Taxonomy ==
Daphne retusa was first described by William Hemsley in 1892. It has been treated as a synonym of the related Daphne tangutica, but this is not accepted by Plants of the World Online as of October 2025.

== Cultivation ==
Under the name Daphne tangutica Retusa Group, this species has gained the Royal Horticultural Society's Award of Garden Merit.
