= Manggarai, Tebet =

Manggarai
- Administrative village
- Interactive map of Manggarai
- Coordinates: 6°12′48″S 106°51′03″E
- Country: Indonesia
- Province: DKI Jakarta
- Administrative city: South Jakarta
- District: Tebet
- Postal code: 12850

Manggarai is an administrative village in Tebet district, South Jakarta, Indonesia. It has postal code of 12850.

== Transportation ==
- Manggarai railway station

== See also ==
- Tebet
- List of administrative villages of Jakarta
