= Tibet (disambiguation) =

Tibet is a landlocked region in Asia.

== Geography ==
- Definitions of Tibet, usages and meanings of "Tibet" over time
- Tibetan Plateau, a geographical region in Asia
- Tibet Autonomous Region, a province of the People's Republic of China formed in 1965
- Central Tibetan Administration, a government-in-exile created in 2011 based in India
- History of Tibet, periods and states:
  - Tibet (1912–1951), the de facto independent polity between 1912 and 1951
  - Tibet under Qing rule (1720–1912), the period under Qing China suzerainty
  - Ganden Phodrang (1642–1959), the government system established by the 5th Dalai Lama, which was independent from 1642–1720
  - Phagmodrupa (1354–1435), Rinpungpa (1435–1565) and Tsangpa (1565–1642) dynasties, clashing governments in the 14th–17th centuries
  - Tibet under Yuan rule (1244–1354), during the Mongol-led Yuan Dynasty
  - Era of Fragmentation (842–1253), a period of shifting and unstable governments and wars between regional warlords
  - Tibetan Empire (c. 618–842), an empire that ruled the Tibetan Plateau in the 7th, 8th, and 9th centuries
  - Yarlung dynasty, a legendary dynasty said to rule before the rise of the Tibetan Empire
  - Neolithic Tibet, the late Stone Age period in archaeology in Tibet
- Great Tibet, a former name of Ladakh in modern India, on the western edge of the Tibetan region
- Little Tibet, a former name of Baltistan in modern Pakistan, on the western edge of the Tibetan region
- Tibet, Georgia, an unincorporated community in Georgia, United States

== People ==
- Tibet (cartoonist), pseudonym of Gilbert Gascard (1931–2010), a French creator of bande dessinées (comics)
- David Tibet (born 1960), British poet and musician
- Kartal Tibet (1938–2021), Turkish actor and film director

== Other uses ==
- Tibet: The Roleplaying Game, a 2004 historical fantasy role-playing game
- Tita in Thibet, an 1879 musical play

== See also ==
- South Tibet
- Free Tibet (disambiguation)
- Tibetan
- Tibetans
- Tebet (disambiguation)
