= Tebet Eco Park =

Urban park in Tebet, Jakarta, Indonesia

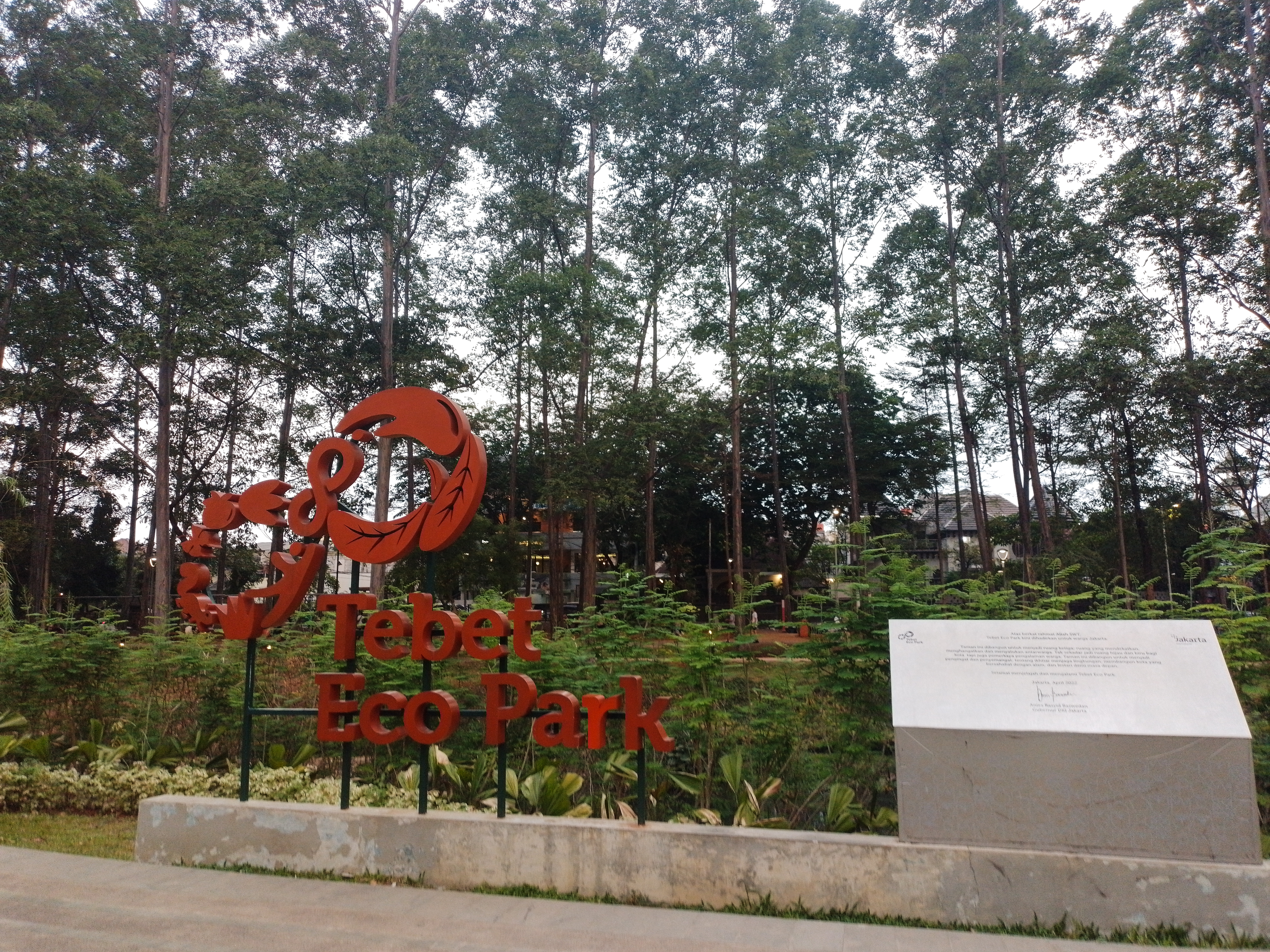
- The entrance of Tebet Eco Park
- Interactive map of Tebet Eco Park
- Type: Urban park
- Location: Tebet, South Jakarta, Jakarta, Indonesia
- Coordinates: 6.237329°S 106.852728°E
- Area: 7 hectares (17 acres)
- Created: 28 July, 2010
- Owner: Government of Jakarta
- Operator: Department of Parks and Cemetery of Government of Jakarta
- Status: Open all year
- Public transit: Tebet Eco Park; Cawang station Cikoko
- Website: tebetecopark.id

The Tebet Eco Park (Indonesian: Taman Eco Tebet) or Taman Kota Tebet is an urban park located in Tebet, Jakarta, Indonesia. The park has a land area of 7 hectares and it was previously known as Tebet Honda Park. It is a popular place for exercise, socialization, and recreation for neighboring community.

== Facilities ==
This park was revitalized in 2022, for multi-functional purposes. It has three main concepts in its development, namely prioritizing ecological functions, especially flood control, social space functions, and also the function of educational and recreational spaces for residents. This park has forest buffer, link bridge, community lawn, wetland boardwalk, children's playground, plaza, community garden, and thematic garden. The park has two part, north and south, connected by a pedestrian bridge named as the Infinity Link Bridge.

There is a Wetland Boardwalk to help contain water flow and increase water retention. Meanwhile, in the Community Garden, there is the main entrance to the South Area with a pavilion equipped with facilities for social activities for the community around Tebet. Swamp Playground or children's play area with a variety of games and viewing decks that take advantage of different contours. The northern part of the park, there are TEP Plaza, thematic gardens, and community lawns. TEP plaza serves as a drop-off area or a visitor's recipient, equipped with a pavilion building, amphitheater, parking facilities and MSMEs. Furthermore, opposite TEP Plaza there is an area with an existing density of Leda trees which is used as a Thematic Garden. Meanwhile, Community Lawn is presented as an area for public activities to do without family or friends, in the field, with an interactive open lawn.

== Gallery ==
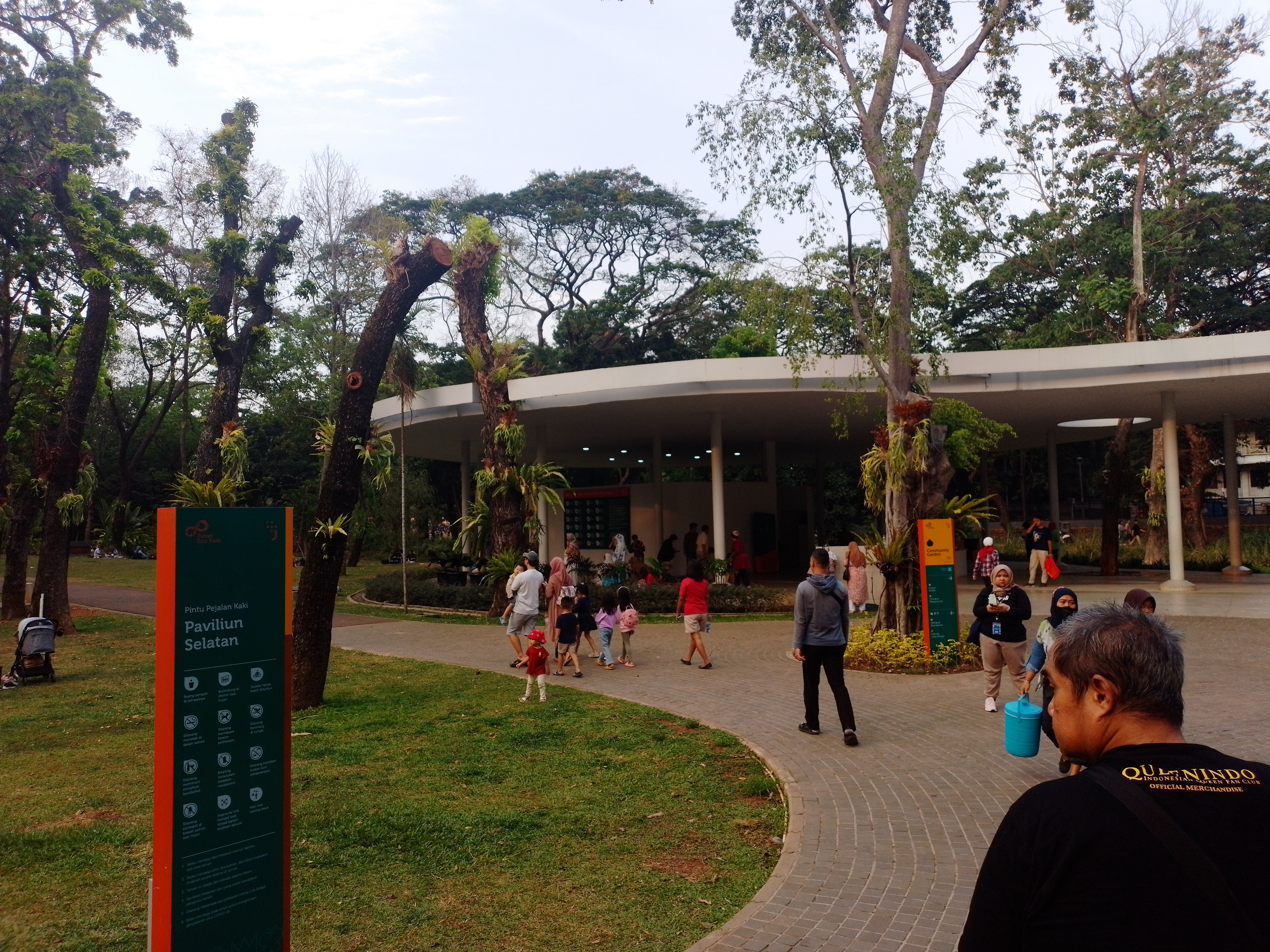
The south pavilion of the park, which houses numbers of facilities

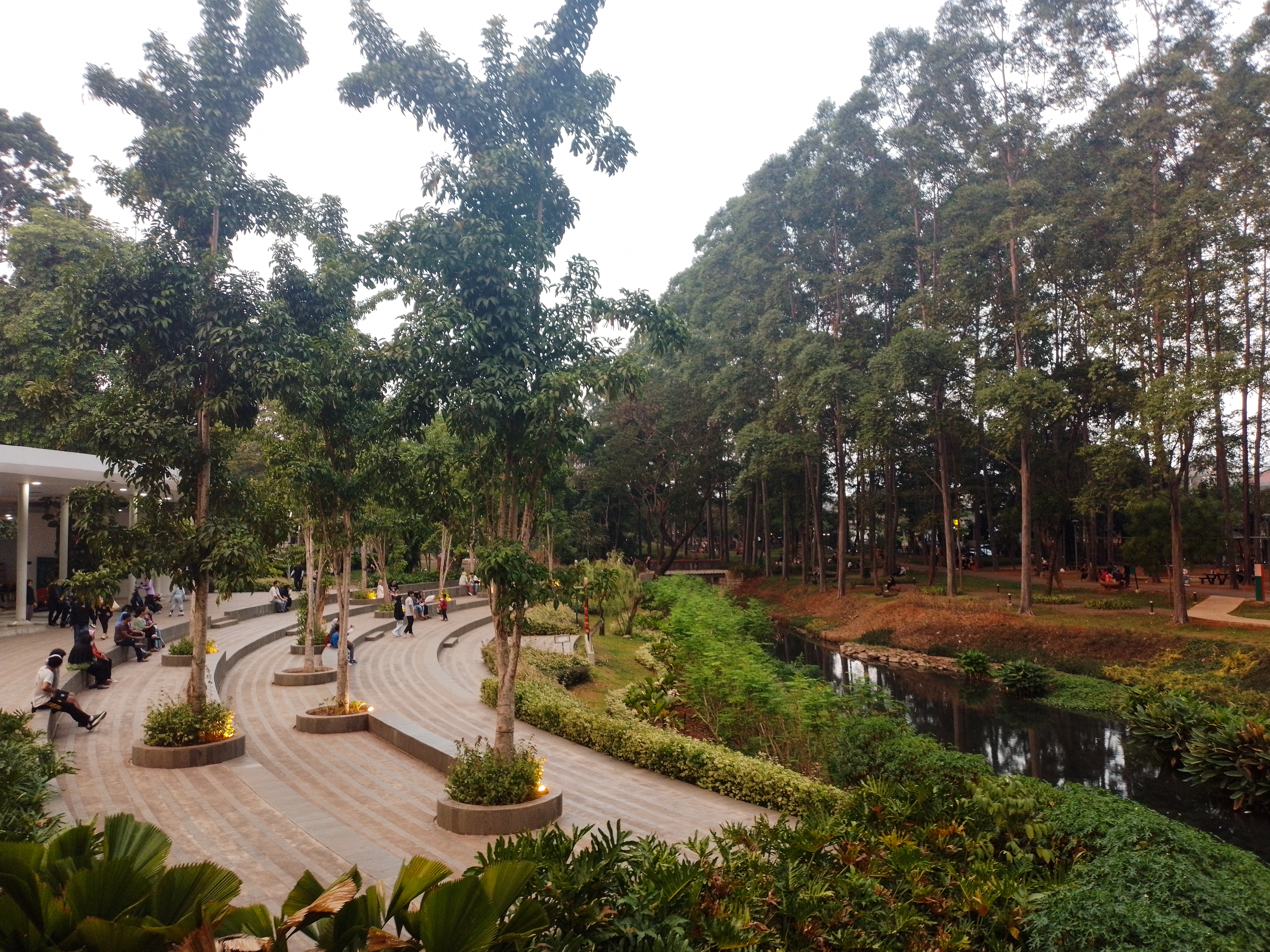
An amphitheatre at the north side of the park

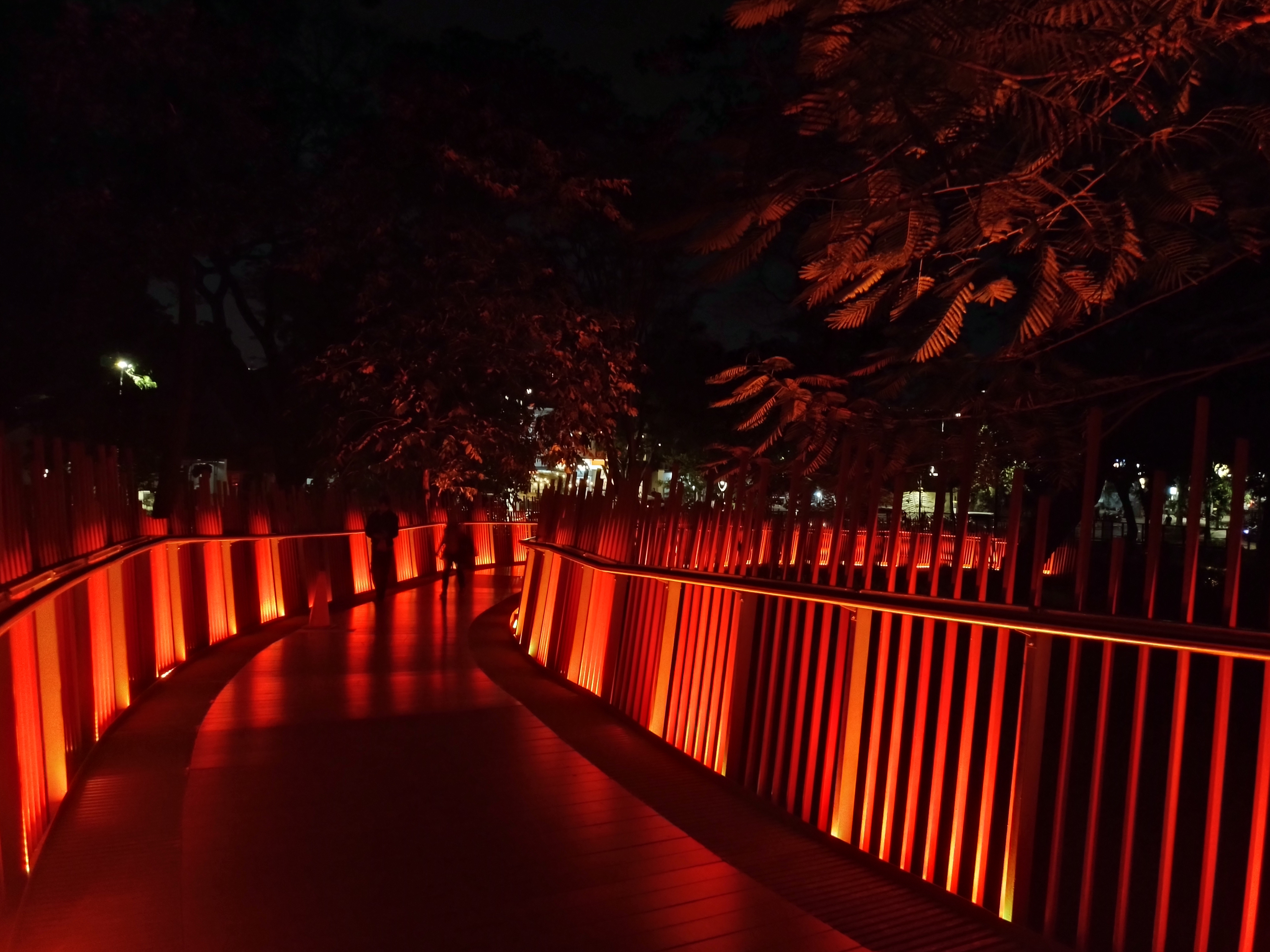
The park's Infinity Link bridge at night, illuminated in red

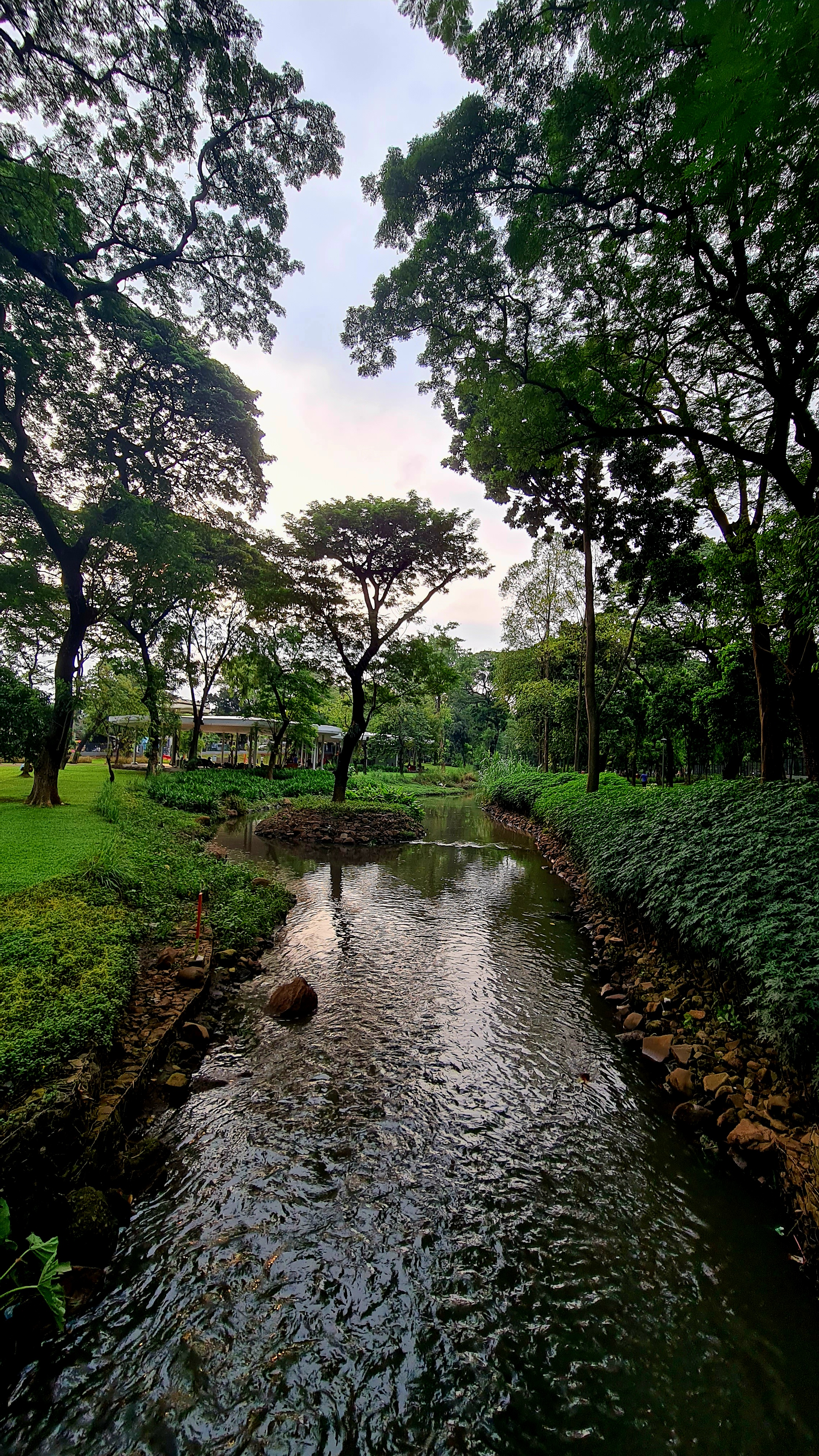
A river splitting the park in the middle
