= Tibetan language =

Tibetan language may refer to:

- Lhasa Tibetan or Standard Tibetan, the most widely used spoken dialect
- Classical Tibetan, the classical language used also as a contemporary written standard
- Any of the other Tibetan languages

== See also ==
- Old Tibetan, the language used from the 7th to the 11th century
- Central Tibetan language, which forms the basis of Standard Tibetan
- Khams Tibetan, spoken in the south-east
- Amdo Tibetan, spoken in the north-east
- Tibetan (disambiguation)
- Bhoti (disambiguation), various Tibetan languages
