= Cikoko LRT station =

Light rapid transit station in South Jakarta, Indonesia

CB06 BK06 Cikoko
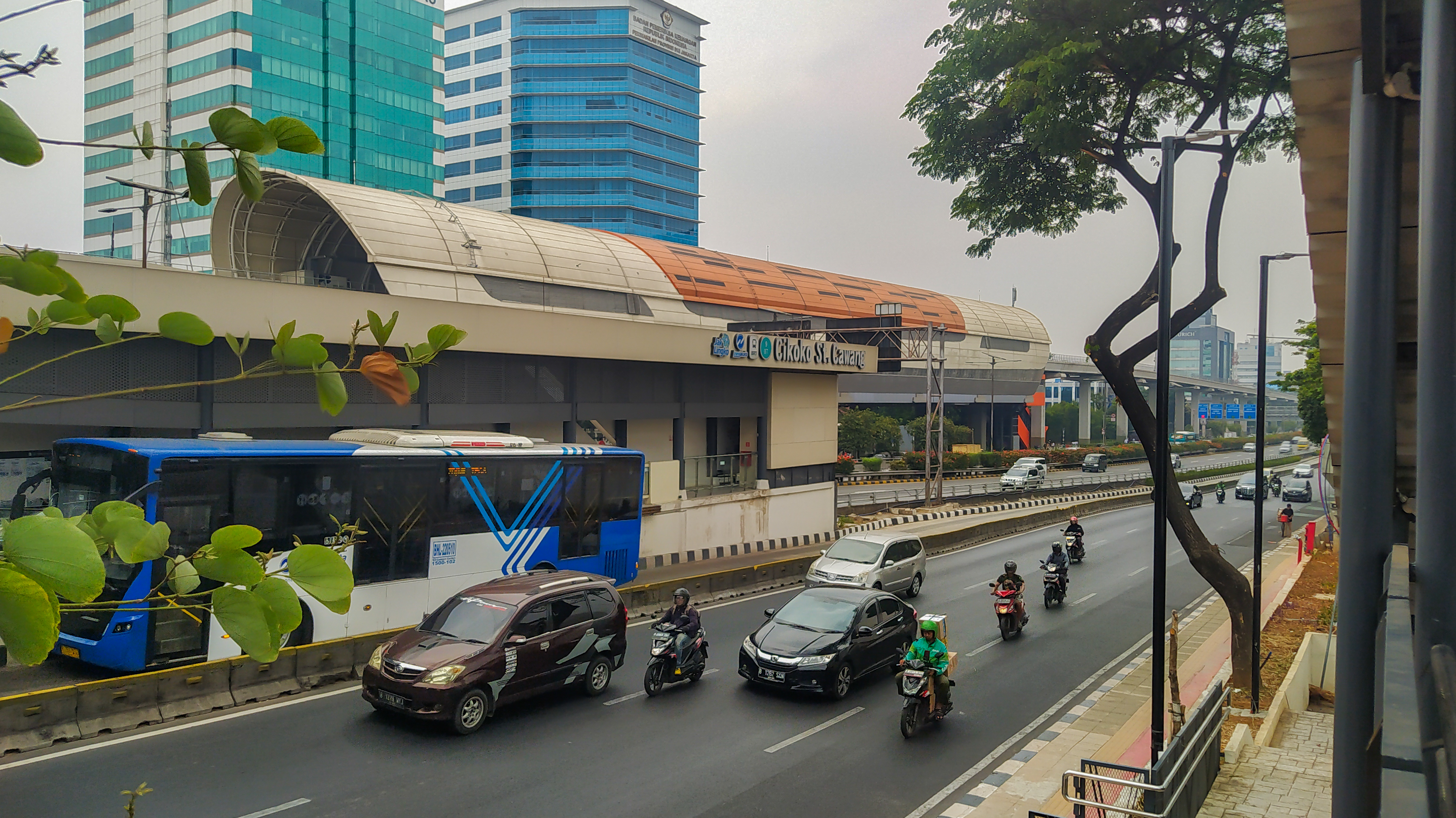
- Cikoko LRT Station viewed from skybridge of Cikoko BRT Station.

General information
- Location: Jalan Cikoko Barat, Cikoko, Pancoran, South Jakarta; Jakarta; Indonesia
- Coordinates: 6.243476°S 106.857102°E
- Elevation: +39.530 m (129.69 ft)
- System: Jabodebek LRT station
- Owner: Directorate General of Railways
- Operator: Kereta Api Indonesia
- Manager: Directorate General of Transportation Integration and Multimodal (Note: Formerly known as Jabodetabek Transportation Management Agency (BPTJ))
- Lines: Cibubur Line; Bekasi Line
- Platforms: 2 side platforms
- Tracks: 2
- Connections: Cawang; Cikoko

Construction
- Structure type: Elevated
- Parking: Unavailable
- Cycle facilities: Available
- Accessible: Available

Other information
- Station code: CKK

History
- Opened: 28 August 2023
- Opening: August 2023 (Note: As trial services)
- Electrified: 2019

Passengers
- 2025: 198.578 ▲22%

Services
Preceding station		Following station
Pancoran towards Dukuh Atas BNI	Cibubur Line	Ciliwung towards Harjamukti
Pancoran towards Dukuh Atas BNI	Bekasi Line	Ciliwung towards Jati Mulya
Route map
Location
- Location within Jakarta
- Interactive map

Cikoko LRT Station, also known as Cikoko Stasiun Cawang, is a light rapid transit station located in Jalan Cikoko Barat, Cikoko, Pancoran, South Jakarta. Located at an altitude of +39.530 amsl, it serves the Cibubur and Bekasi lines of the Jabodebek LRT system.

== Station layout ==
2nd floor
Side platform, the doors are opened on the right side
Line 1
← (Ciliwung)
Cibubur Line to Harjamukti,

Bekasi Line to Jati Mulya

Line 2

Cibubur Line to Dukuh Atas BNI,

Bekasi Line to Dukuh Atas BNI

(Pancoran) →
Side platform, the doors are opened on the right side
1st floor
Concourse
Ticket counter, ticket vending machines, fare gates, retail kiosks, and access to Cawang railway station of KRL Commuterline and Cikoko Transjakarta BRT Station
Ground level
Street
Entrance/Exit

== Services ==
- Cibubur Line
- Bekasi Line

== Intermodal support ==
Public transport type	Transfer at	Route	Destination
Commuter Line	Cawang	KAI Commuter Bogor Line	Jakarta Kota–Bogor
Commuter Line	Cawang	KAI Commuter Bogor Line	Jakarta Kota–Nambo
Transjakarta	Cikoko St. Cawang (BRT Station)	List of TransJakarta corridors#Corridor 9	Pinang Ranti–Pluit
Transjakarta	Cikoko St. Cawang (BRT Station)	List of TransJakarta corridors#Cross-corridor routes	Cililitan–Grogol Reformasi
Transjakarta	Cikoko St. Cawang (BRT Station)	List of TransJakarta corridors#Cross-corridor routes	Pinang Ranti–Bundaran Senayan
Transjakarta (Non-BRT)	Cikoko St. Cawang (BRT Station)		Pulo Gadung–Kejaksaan Agung
Transjakarta (Non-BRT)	Cikoko St. Cawang (BRT Station)		TMII–Pancoran
Transjakarta (Non-BRT)	Cikoko St. Cawang (BRT Station)		Cibubur Junction–Pluit
Mikrotrans	Stasiun Cawang 2 and Stasiun Cawang 3 (Bus stops)	JAK 43B	Pusat Grosir Cililitan–Bukit Duri

== Surrounding area ==
- Jakarta BPK representative office building
- The Green Tower commercial office building
- Cawang railway station
- Saidah Tower
