= Tebet, South Jakarta =

District in South Jakarta, Indonesia

Tebet
- District
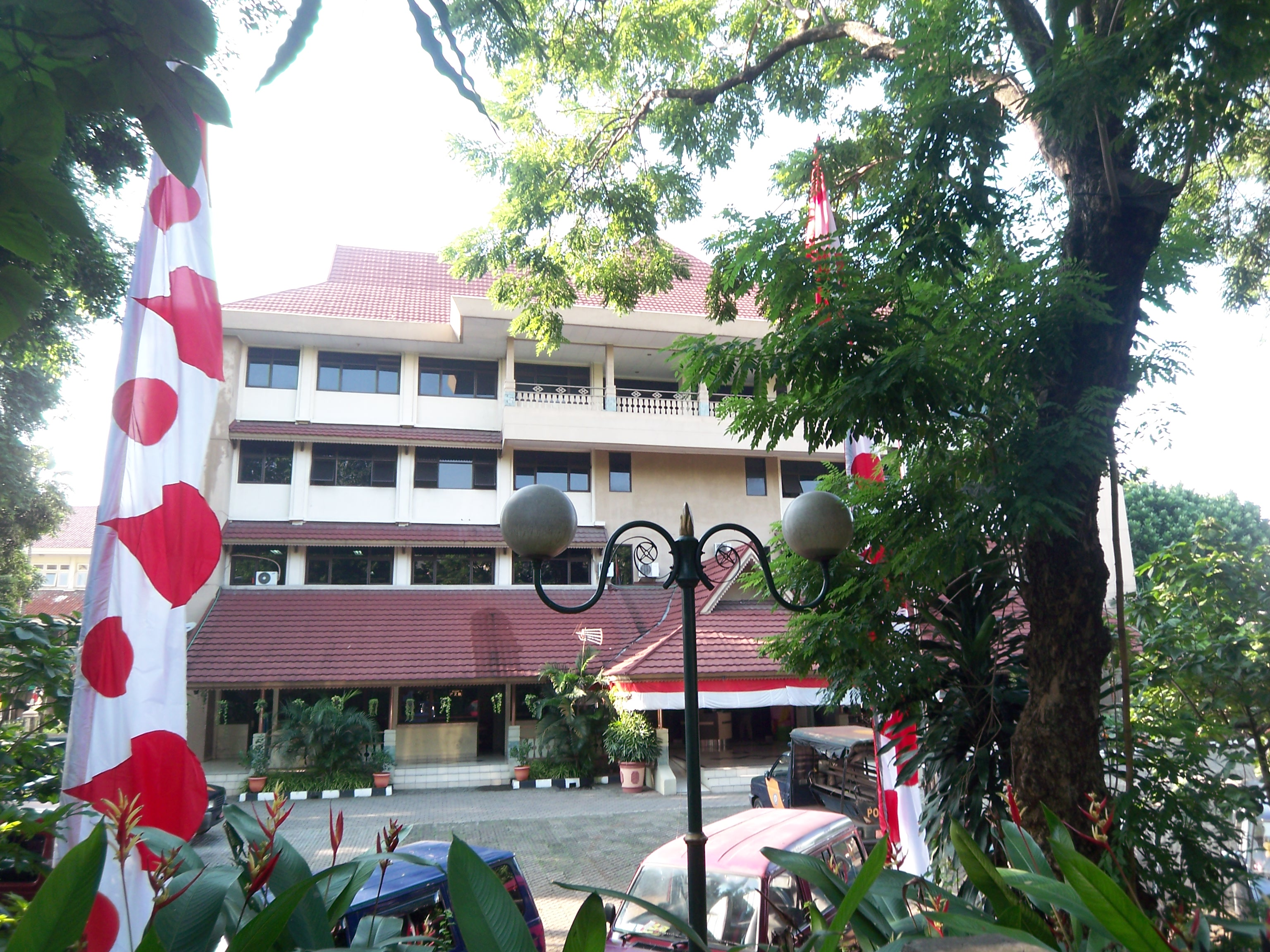
- Office of Tebet District

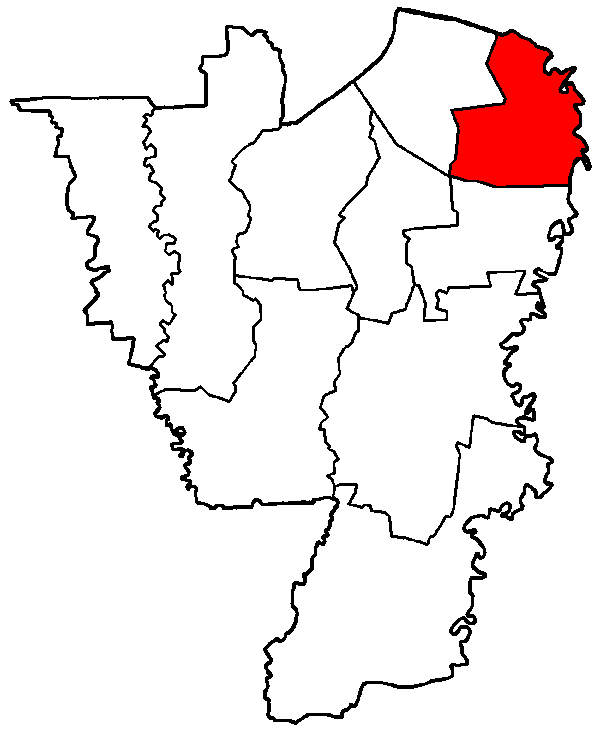
- The district of Tebet in South Jakarta
- Country: Indonesia
- Province: Jakarta
- Administrative city: South Jakarta

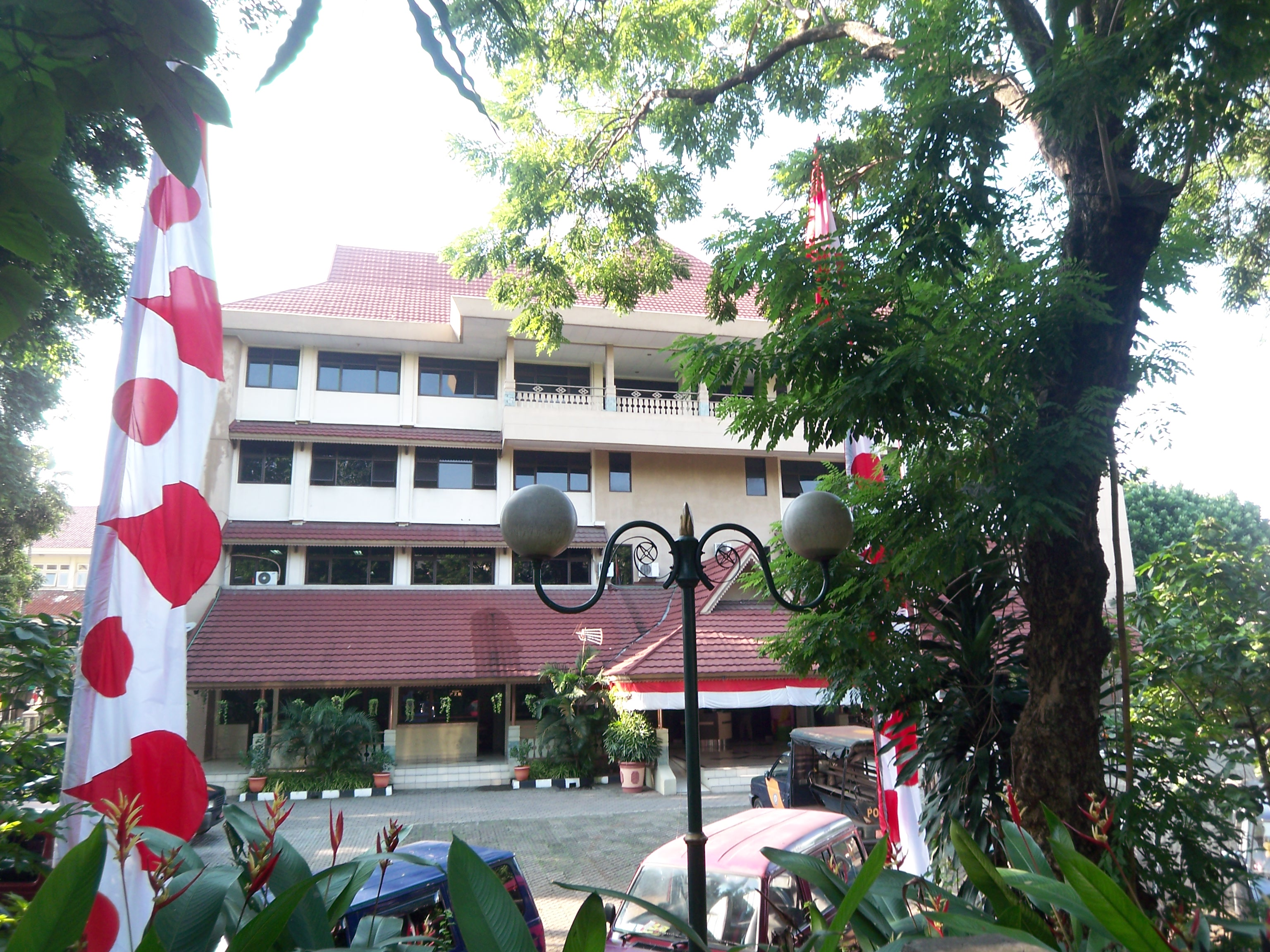
Tebet Subdistrict government office.

Tebet is a district in the administrative city of South Jakarta, Indonesia. The boundaries of Tebet are Jend. Gatot Subroto-Letjen Haryono MT. tollway to the south, Ciliwung River to the east, Jalan Casablanca - Ciliwung River to the north, and Cideng River to the west. This district is home to SMA Negeri 8 Jakarta

Tebet is prone to flooding, especially within some areas around the Ciliwung River.

== History ==
Before urban development, the area that is now Tebet were marsh lands dotted with fish ponds and criss-crossing canals. The river Ciliwung was present in the east side of the district. The name Tebet itself was derived from tebat, Indonesian for "fish pond". Up until the early 1960s many fish ponds could still be found in Tebet.

In preparation for GANEFO and the 1962 Asian Games, the population residing in Senayan had to be relocated because of the compulsory land acquisition to build the Gelora Bung Karno sporting complex. Hence the planning of Tebet started very early in the 1960s to house the displaced people of Senayan. The administrative villages of Tebet Timur (Jakarta 12820) and Tebet Barat (Jakarta 12810) were the first areas in the Tebet District to be developed. The Communist Party of Indonesia's short-lived social sciences school Aliarcham Academy (1959–65) was also located in Tebet.

Planning of Tebet Timur and the Tebet area follows a more or less garden city principle similar with older Kebayoran residential district in southern Jakarta: hierarchical roads, parks, supporting facilities such as schools and clinics, and good water catchment area. Some area in the Tebet residential area were designed as recreation park and water catchment area. One of this area was the park that is now known as Tebet Eco Park. Other parks, e.g. Rawa Bilal, has already been settled with housing that is now Jalan Tebet Mas.

By the early 1970s, the Tebet residential area had already made considerable progress. During the period, some streets were named to commemorate the era of Sukarno e.g. Ganefo Street, Nefo Street (after the GANEFO), Usdek Street, Berdikari Street, and Trikora Street.

Tebet Barat and Tebet Timur Administrative Villages present a well-planned urban design example which contrast the relatively unplanned kampung-like area of Kebon Baru (and Gudang Peluru, Jakarta 12830) to the east of Tebet Timur Administrative Village and Menteng Dalam (Jakarta 12870) to the west of Tebet Barat Administrative Village. Kebon Baru and Menteng Dalam Administrative Village grew in the 1970s with no proper planning and as a result the area was prone to flooding and filled with relatively underdeveloped slums.

== Subdistricts ==
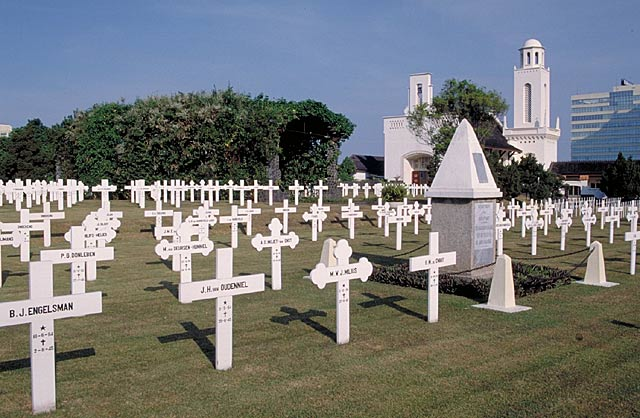
Dutch War Cemetery Menteng Pulo in Menteng Dalam Kelurahan, Tebet Subdistrict.

Tebet District is divided into seven kelurahan or administrative sub-districts:

Name	Area/postal code
Tebet Barat	12810
Tebet Timur	12820
Kebon Baru	12830
Bukit Duri	12840
Manggarai	12850
Manggarai Selatan	12860
Menteng Dalam	12870

== List of important places ==
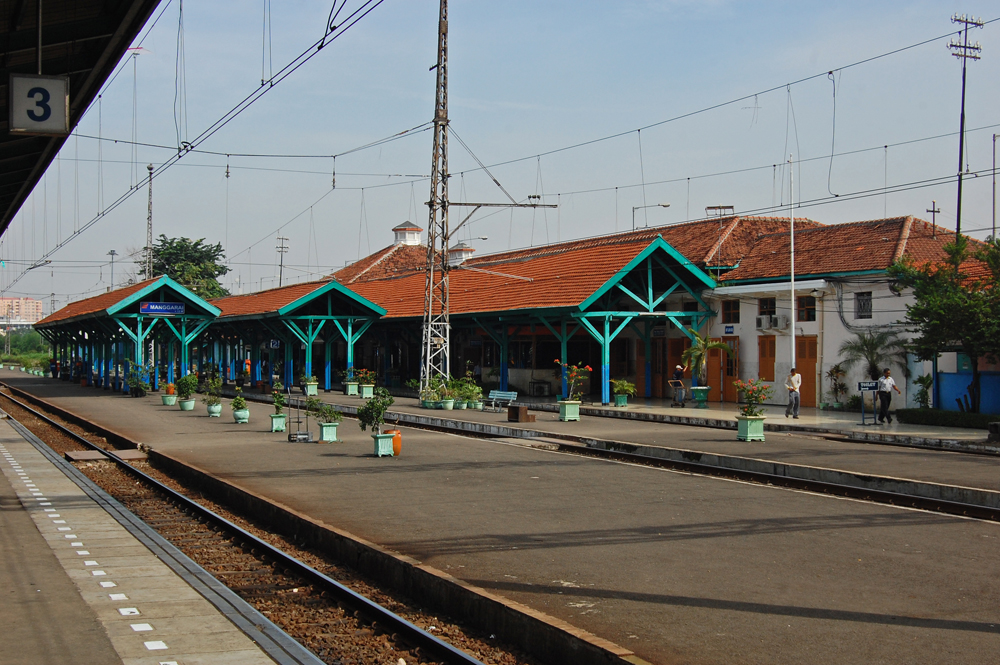
Manggarai Station (2010), located in Tebet District, serves the Jakarta-Bogor Railway.

- Dutch War Cemetery Menteng Pulo
- Cawang Railway Station (Tebet Timur)
- Manggarai Railway Station, Railway Workshops and Depot
- Sahid University
- Kota Kasablanka
- Tebet Eco Park
- Tebet Railway Station
- SMPN 115 Jakarta
- SMAN 8 Jakarta
- SMPN 73 Jakarta
- SMAN 26 Jakarta

== Notable residents ==
- Barack Obama, 44th President of the United States, lived there from 1967 to 1971

== Cited works ==
- Merrillees, Scott (2015). Jakarta: Portraits of a Capital 1950-1980. Jakarta: Equinox Publishing. ISBN 9786028397308.
