= Tibetan bell =

Tibetan bell may refer to:

- Tibetan Bells (album), a 1971 album by Henry Wolff and Nancy Hennings

== Instruments ==
- Ghanta, a Tibetan handbell usually paired with a vajra in Vajrayana Buddhism
- Shang (bell), a Tibetan hand-bell
- Singing bowl, a standing bell or resting bell is an inverted bell
- Tingsha, traditional Tibetan cymbal bells
