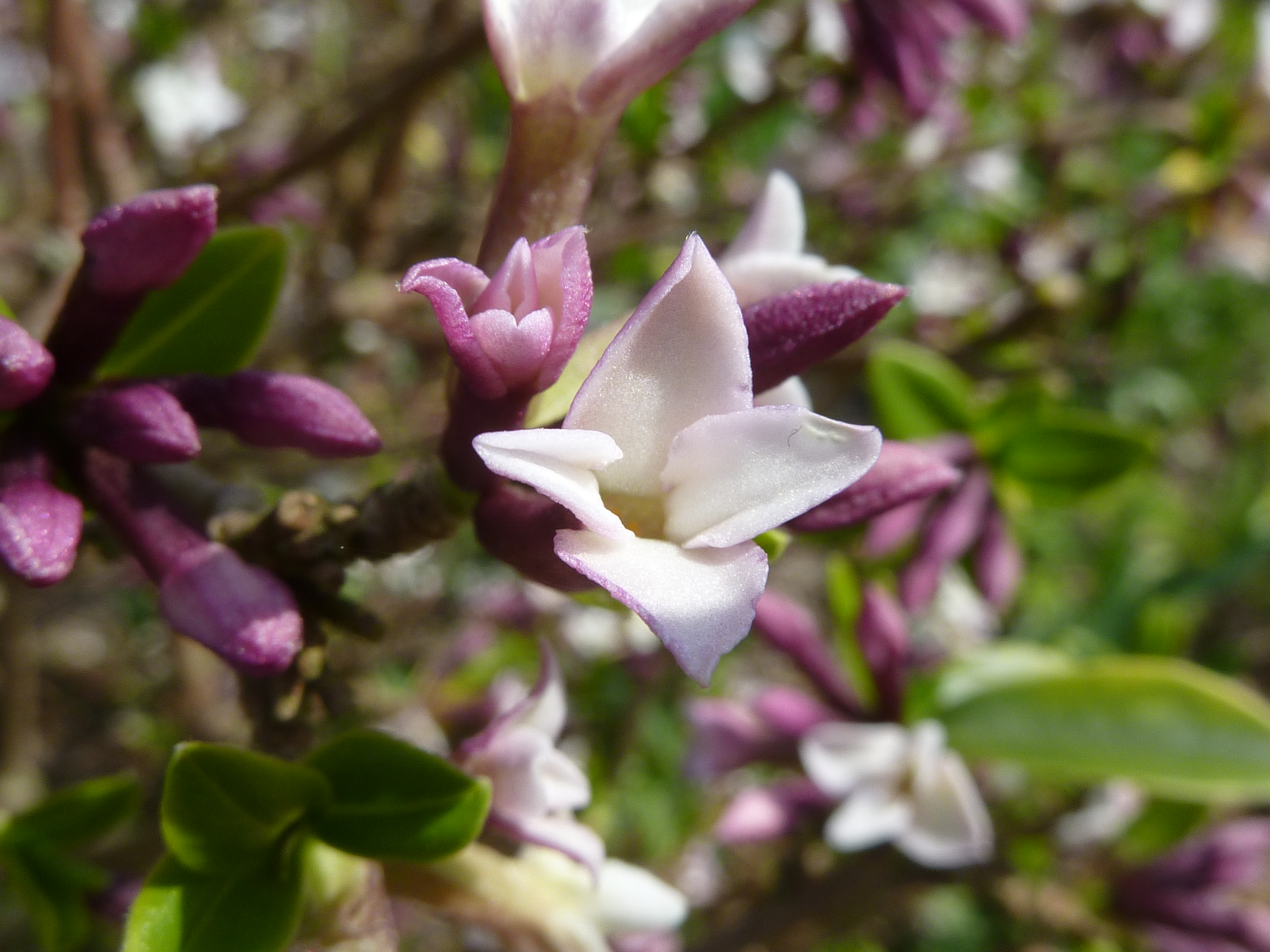
- Cambridge University Botanic Garden

Scientific classification
- Kingdom: Plantae
- Clade: Embryophytes
- Clade: Tracheophytes
- Clade: Spermatophytes
- Clade: Angiosperms
- Clade: Eudicots
- Clade: Rosids
- Order: Malvales
- Family: Thymelaeaceae
- Genus: Daphne
- Species: D. tangutica

Binomial name
- Daphne tangutica Maxim.

= Daphne tangutica =

Species of flowering plant

Daphne tangutica is a species of flowering plant in the family Thymelaeaceae, native to west and central China, including Tibet and Qinghai. It is an evergreen shrub growing to 1 m (3 ft 3 in) tall and wide, with leathery leaves and clusters of fragrant white and pink flowers in spring. The flowers are often followed by red berries. It grows in forests.

Daphne retusa has been treated as a synonym, but this is not accepted by Plants of the World Online as of October 2025.

The Latin specific epithet tangutica refers to an historical tribe in what is now north western China, but has become a synonym for Tibet, part of the plant's native range.

This plant has gained the Royal Horticultural Society's Award of Garden Merit.
