= Free Tibet (disambiguation) =

Free Tibet, or Free Tibet Campaign, is a non-profit, non-governmental organization based in London, England.

Free Tibet may also refer to:

- Tibetan independence movement, a movement for the independence of the lands where Tibetan people live
- Tibetan Youth Congress
- Students for a Free Tibet
- Tibetan Freedom Concert, (1996–2012)
- International Campaign for Tibet
- Free Tibet (album), a 2006 album by Death In June
