= State Elementary School Pondok Kelapa 07 Pagi =

SD Negeri Pondok Kelapa 07 Pagi
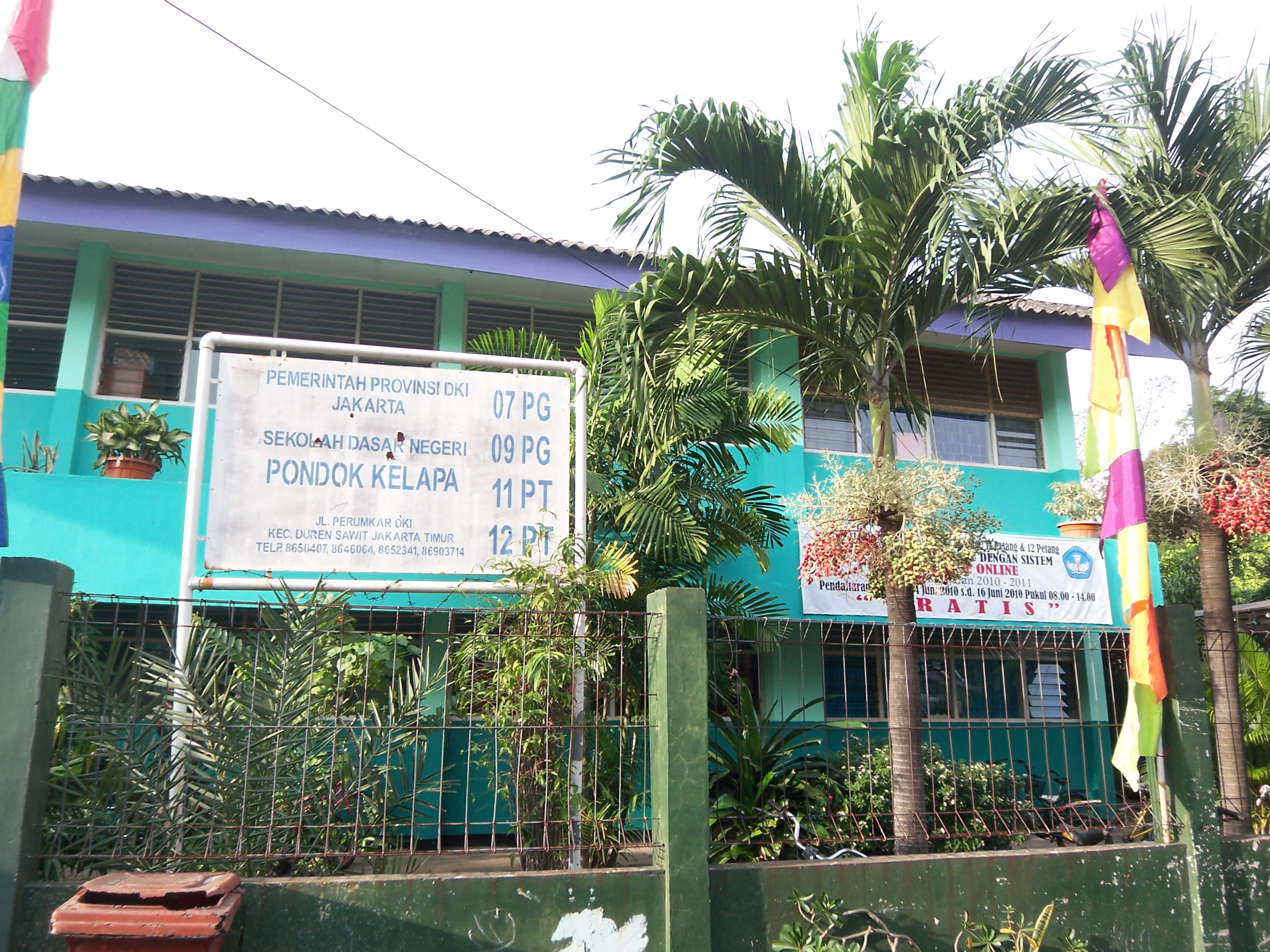

Location
- Jakarta; Indonesia
- Coordinates: 6°14′24″S 106°56′21″E

Information
- Type: Public
- Enrollment: 329 orang

State Elementary School Pondok Kelapa 07 Pagi (Indonesian: Sekolah Dasar Negeri (SDN) Pondok Kelapa 07 Pagi) is an Indonesian public school in Komplek Perumkar Pemda DKI Pondok Kelapa, Kecamatan Duren Sawit, Jakarta Timur. This school sharing the same building with:

- State Elementary School Pondok Kelapa 09 Pagi
- State Elementary School Pondok Kelapa 11 Petang dan
- State Elementary School Pondok Kelapa 12 Petang
