= State Elementary School Pondok Kelapa 09 Pagi =

SD Negeri Pondok Kelapa 09 Pagi
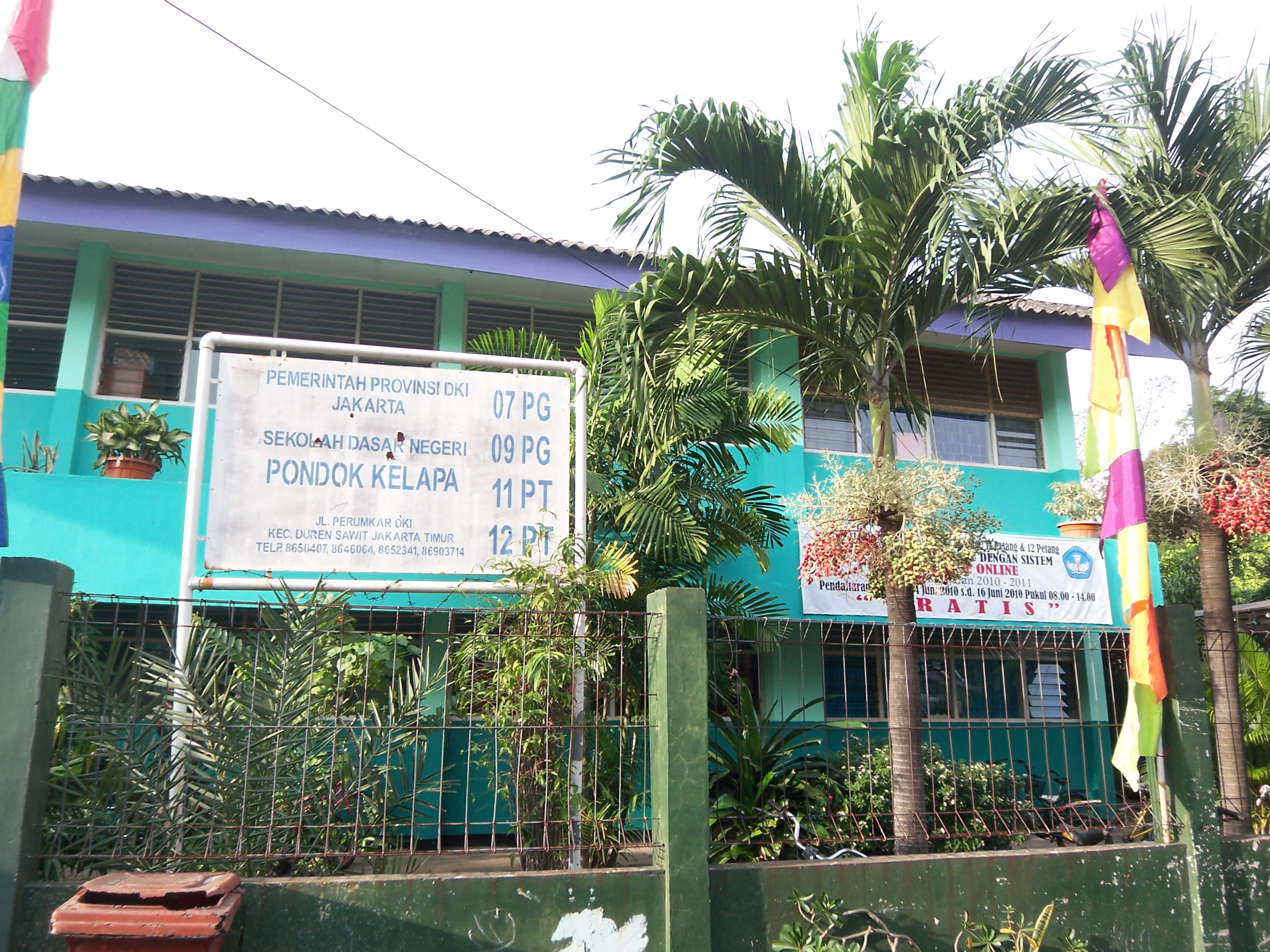

Location
- Jakarta; Indonesia
- Coordinates: 6°14′24″S 106°56′21″E

Information
- Type: Public
- Principal Vice Principal Deputy Headmaster: Erdalia Muchtar, S.Pd
- Enrollment: 391 orang

State Elementary School Pondok Kelapa 09 Pagi (Indonesian: Sekolah Dasar Negeri (SDN) Pondok Kelapa 09 Pagi) is an Indonesian public school in Komplek Perumkar Pemda DKI Pondok Kelapa, Kecamatan Duren Sawit, Jakarta Timur. This school sharing the same building with:

- State Elementary School Pondok Kelapa 07 Pagi
- State Elementary School Pondok Kelapa 11 Petang and
- State Elementary School Pondok Kelapa 12 Petang
