= List of tallest buildings in Southeast Asia =

This is a list of tallest skyscrapers and supertalls in Southeast Asia with a height of at least 250m. They are ranked by structural height.

== Tallest buildings ==
Was the tallest building in Southeast Asia upon completion
Indicates buildings still under construction that have been architecturally topped out but not yet fully opened

| Rank | Building | Image | City | Country | Height (m) | Floors | Completed | Notes |
|---|---|---|---|---|---|---|---|---|
| 1 | Merdeka 118 | | Kuala Lumpur | Malaysia | 678.9 m | 118 | 2023 | The world's second tallest freestanding structure. The first megatall skyscraper in Southeast Asia. |
| 2 | Landmark 81 | | Ho Chi Minh City | Vietnam | 461.2 m | 81 | 2018 | Tallest skyscraper in Southeast Asia from 2018 - 2021. Tallest skyscraper in Vietnam. |
| 3 | Petronas Tower 1 | | Kuala Lumpur | Malaysia | 451.9 m | 88 | 1998 | The world's tallest twin skyscrapers. The world's tallest from 1998 - 2004 and remains the tallest skyscrapers in 20th century. The tallest skyscrapers in Southeast Asia from 1998 - 2018 and Malaysia from 1998 - 2021. |
| 3 | Petronas Tower 2 | | Kuala Lumpur | Malaysia | 451.9 m | 88 | 1998 | The world's tallest twin skyscrapers. The world's tallest from 1998 - 2004 and remains the tallest skyscrapers in 20th century. The tallest skyscrapers in Southeast Asia from 1998 - 2018 and Malaysia from 1998 - 2021. |
| 5 | The Exchange 106 | | Kuala Lumpur | Malaysia | 445.5 m | 95 | 2019 | Tallest in Southeast Asia by highest occupied floor from 2019-2023. |
| 6 | Autograph Tower | | Jakarta | Indonesia | 382.9 m | 83 | 2022 | The tallest skyscraper in Indonesia and the Southern Hemisphere. |
| 7 | So/ Sofitel Residences | | Kuala Lumpur | Malaysia | 345 m | 84 | 2025 | |
| 8 | Four Seasons Place Kuala Lumpur | | Kuala Lumpur | Malaysia | 342.5 m | 75 | 2018 | |
| 9 | Landmark 72 | | Hanoi | Vietnam | 328.6 m | 72 | 2012 | Tallest skyscraper in Vietnam from 2012 - 2018. |
| 10 | Metrobank Center | | Taguig, Manila | Philippines | 318 m | 66 | 2016 | Tallest skyscraper in the Philippines. |
| 11 | Magnolias Waterfront Residences | | Bangkok | Thailand | 315 m | 70 | 2018 | Tallest skyscraper in Thailand. |
| 12 | King Power MahaNakhon | | Bangkok | Thailand | 314 m | 79 | 2016 | Tallest skyscraper in Thailand from 2016 - 2018. |
| 13 | Telekom Tower | | Kuala Lumpur | Malaysia | 310 m | 55 | 2001 | |
| 14 | Baiyoke Tower II | | Bangkok | Thailand | 304 m | 85 | 1997 | Tallest skyscraper in Thailand from 1997 - 2016. The first supertall skyscraper in Southeast Asia. |
| 15 | Luminary Tower | | Jakarta | Indonesia | 304 m | 64 | 2023 | |
| 16 | Four Seasons Private Residences Bangkok | | Bangkok | Thailand | 299.5 m | 73 | 2019 | |
| 17 | Gama Tower | | Jakarta | Indonesia | 288.6 m | 64 | 2016 | Tallest skyscraper in Indonesia from 2016 - 2022. |
| 18 | Azure Tower | | Jakarta | Indonesia | 288 m | 77 | 2024 | |
| 19 | Guoco Tower | | Singapore | Singapore | 283.7 m | 65 | 2016 | Tallest skyscraper in Singapore. |
| 20 | United Overseas Bank Plaza One | | Singapore | Singapore | 280 m | 66 | 1992 | Tallest skyscraper in Southeast Asia from 1992 - 1997 |
| 20 | CapitaSpring | | Singapore | Singapore | 280 m | 52 | 2021 | |
| 22 | Treasury Tower | | Jakarta | Indonesia | 279.5 m | 57 | 2018 | |
| 23 | The Astaka Tower A | | Johor Bahru | Malaysia | 278.8 m | 72 | 2018 | Tallest buildings in Johor Bahru, tallest buildings outside of Kuala Lumpur & tallest residential tower in South East Asia. |
| 24 | One Raffles Place Tower 1 | | Singapore | Singapore | 277.8 m | 63 | 1986 | Tallest skyscraper in Southeast Asia from 1986 - 1992 |
| 25 | Republic Plaza | | Singapore | Singapore | 276.3 m | 66 | 1998 | |
| 26 | One City Centre | | Bangkok | Thailand | 275.8 m | 61 | 2023 | |
| 27 | Ilham Tower | | Kuala Lumpur | Malaysia | 274 m | 60 | 2015 | |
| 28 | Lotte Center Hanoi | | Hanoi | Vietnam | 272 m | 65 | 2014 | |
| 29 | The Residences at Mandarin Oriental, Bangkok | | Bangkok | Thailand | 269 m | 52 | 2018 | |
| 30 | Petronas Tower 3 | | Kuala Lumpur | Malaysia | 267 m | 60 | 2012 | |
| 31 | Jakarta Mori Tower | | Jakarta | Indonesia | 266 m | 59 | 2022 | |
| 32 | Star Residences RT2 | | Kuala Lumpur | Malaysia | 265 m | 58 | 2019 | |
| 32 | Star Residences RT3 | | Kuala Lumpur | Malaysia | 265 m | 58 | 2019 | |
| 34 | Bitexco Financial Tower | | Ho Chi Minh City | Vietnam | 263 m | 68 | 2010 | Tallest skyscraper in Vietnam from 2010 - 2012. |
| 35 | Wisma 46 | | Jakarta | Indonesia | 261.9 m | 51 | 1996 | Tallest skyscraper in Indonesia from 1996 - 2016. |
| 36 | Astra Tower | | Jakarta | Indonesia | 261.5 m | 49 | 2017 | |
| 37 | Kingbridge Tower | | Bangkok | Thailand | 260 m | 43 | 2024 | |
| 38 | PBCom Tower | | Makati | Philippines | 258.6 m | 55 | 2000 | Tallest skyscraper in the Philippines from 2000 - 2016. |
| 39 | The River South Tower | | Bangkok | Thailand | 258 m | 74 | 2012 | |
| 40 | The Astaka Tower B | | Johor Bahru | Malaysia | 255.6 m | 67 | 2018 | One of the tallest buildings in Johor Bahru. |
| 41 | Capital Tower | | Singapore | Singapore | 254 m | 52 | 2000 | |
| 41 | Millennium Office Tower | | Jakarta | Indonesia | 254 m | 53 | 2019 | |
| 43 | Canapaya Residences | | Bangkok | Thailand | 253.3 m | 57 | 2019 | |
| 43 | Raffles Hotel | | Jakarta | Indonesia | 253.3 m | 52 | 2014 | |
| 45 | Permata Sapura Tower | | Kuala Lumpur | Malaysia | 252.5 m | 53 | 2020 | |
| 46 | The Pakubuwono Signature | | Jakarta | Indonesia | 252 m | 50 | 2014 | |
| 47 | Star Residences RT1 | | Kuala Lumpur | Malaysia | 251 m | 57 | 2019 | |
| 48 | Trump Tower Manila | | Makati | Philippines | 250.7 m | 58 | 2017 | |
| 49 | Altez @ Enggor Street | | Singapore | Singapore | 250 m | 62 | 2014 | |
| 49 | Skysuites @ Anson Enggor Street | | Singapore | Singapore | 250 m | 72 | 2014 | |
| 51 | Shang Salcedo | | Makati | Philippines | 249.8 m | 67 | 2017 | |
| 52 | The Mega Tower | | Mandaluyong | Philippines | 249.7 m | 50 | 2021 | |
| 51 | KOMTAR | | George Town | Malaysia | 232 m 248.7 m | 65; 68 | 1985; 2015 | Tallest skyscraper in Southeast Asia from 1985 - 1986 & tallest in Northern Peninsular Malaysia. |

== Buildings proposed or under construction ==
| Building | City | Country | Height (m) | Floors | Estimated Completed | Note | Ref |
|---|---|---|---|---|---|---|---|
| Tradewinds Square | Kuala Lumpur | Malaysia | 775 m | 150 | 2030 | Would be the tallest building in Malaysia | |
| Tower M | Kuala Lumpur | Malaysia | 700 m | 145 | - | Would be one of the top three tallest building in the world upon completion, formerly KLCC East Gate Tower | |
| Signature Tower | Jakarta | Indonesia | 638 m | 114 | 2032 | Would be the second tallest building in Indonesia | |
| Rama IX Super Tower | Bangkok | Thailand | 615 m | 125 | 2033 | Would be the tallest building in Thailand | |
| Bandar Malaysia Landmark Tower | Kuala Lumpur | Malaysia | 599 m | 150 | - | | |
| Malaya 115 | Kuala Lumpur | Malaysia | 598.5 m | 115 | - | Would be the second tallest building in Malaysia and Southeast Asia, and the sixth tallest in the world, surpassing the Lotte World Tower in South Korea. | |
| Hanoi Twin Towers 99 Tower 1 | Hanoi | Vietnam | 569 m | 99 | 2030 | Would be the tallest building in Vietnam and the tallest twin towers in the world | |
| Hanoi Twin Towers 99 Tower 2 | Hanoi | Vietnam | 569 m | 99 | 2030 | Would be the tallest building in Vietnam and the tallest twin towers in the world | |
| Thai Boon Roong Twin Tower World Trade Center 1 | Phnom Penh | Cambodia | 561.7 m | 133 | 2030 | Would be the tallest building in Cambodia and the tallest twin towers in the world | |
| Thai Boon Roong Twin Tower World Trade Center 2 | Phnom Penh | Cambodia | 561.7 m | 133 | 2030 | Would be the tallest building in Cambodia and the tallest twin towers in the world | |
| Smart City Financial Tower | Hanoi | Vietnam | 553 m | 108 | 2028 | Would be the second tallest building in Vietnam | |
| Lido Sky 118 | Johor Bahru | Malaysia | 551 m | 118 | - | Would be the fourth tallest building in Malaysia | |
| Makkasan Complex | Bangkok | Thailand | 550 m | 120 | - | Would be the second tallest building in Thailand | |
| Domino Tower | Ha Long Bay | Vietnam | 540 m | 99 | - | Would be third tallest building in Vietnam upon completion | |
| Pertamina Energy Tower | Jakarta | Indonesia | 523 m | 99 | 2030 | Would be the third tallest building in Indonesia upon completion | |
| Time 108 City | Yangon | Myanmar | 520 m | 108 | 2029 | Would be the tallest building in Myanmar | |
| Bandar Malaysia Iconic Tower | Kuala Lumpur | Malaysia | 500 m+ | 100 | - | | |
| Sihanoukville Financial Tower | Sihanoukville | Cambodia | 494 m | 106 | 2029 | | |
| MGN Tower | Phnom Penh | Cambodia | 485 m | 85 | 2028 | | |
| Asiatique Iconic Tower | Bangkok | Thailand | 450 m | 100 | - | Would be the third tallest building in Thailand upon completion | |
| MC Tower | Jakarta | Indonesia | 450 m | 80 | - | | |
| 1 Financial Trade Tower | Malacca | Malaysia | 436 m | 110 | - | | |
| One Bangkok Signature Tower | Bangkok | Thailand | 436 m | 92 | 2027 | | |
| KL Vertical City | Kuala Lumpur | Malaysia | 418 m | 74 | - | Currently on hold | |
| Da Nang Downtown Tower | Da Nang | Vietnam | 408 m | 70 | 2030 | Would be fifth tallest building in Vietnam upon completion | |
| Pollux Habibie Financial Center & International Hotel | Batam | Indonesia | 400 m | 100 | 2027 | | |
| Naza Signature Tower | Kuala Lumpur | Malaysia | 400 m+ | 100 | - | | |
| Chao Phraya Gateway | Bangkok | Thailand | 398 m | 110 | - | | |
| Fragrant Sukhumvit 36 | Bangkok | Thailand | 395 m | 68 | - | | |
| Plaza Rakyat Tower 1 | Kuala Lumpur | Malaysia | 391 m | 92 | - | | |
| Peruri 88 | Jakarta | Indonesia | 389 m | 88 | - | Currently on hold Would be the tallest unique skyscraper in Indonesia and possibly Southeast Asia | |
| Golden Topper BGC Icon Tower | Taguig | Philippines | 388 m | 80 | 2030 | Would be the tallest buildings in the Philippines | |
| Bukit Bintang City Centre Signature Tower | Kuala Lumpur | Malaysia | 385 m+ | 88 | - | | |
| Jewel I-City | Shah Alam | Malaysia | 381 m | 73 | - | | |
| Fairmont Kuala Lumpur Tower 1 | Kuala Lumpur | Malaysia | 370 m | 78 | - | | |
| Coronation Square (The Crest) | Johor Bahru | Malaysia | 370 m | 78 | 2028 | | |
| VietinBank Business Center Office Tower | Hanoi | Vietnam | 365 m | 68 | 2023 | Currently on hold. Would be the tallest office building in Vietnam upon completion | |
| Naga 3 Tower 1 | Phnom Penh | Cambodia | 358 m | 75 | 2026 | | |
| KL PWTC Tower | Kuala Lumpur | Malaysia | 351 m | 70 | - | | |
| Ciputra World Jakarta 1 Tower 4 | Jakarta | Indonesia | 350 m | 70 | - | | |
| HOME Financial Tower | Singapore | Singapore | 345 m | 65 | 2035 | | |
| Oasis Central Sudirman Tower-1 | Jakarta | Indonesia | 340 m | 75 | - | | |
| Empire 88 Tower | Ho Chi Minh City | Vietnam | 333 m | 88 | - | | |
| J Tower 3 | Phnom Penh | Cambodia | 333 m | 77 | 2028 | | |
| Morgan Enmaison Tower 3 | Phnom Penh | Cambodia | 331 m | 72 | 2024 | | |
| IBN Bukit Bintang | Kuala Lumpur | Malaysia | 330 m | 68 | 2026 | | |
| Yutai Twin Tower 1 | Phnom Penh | Cambodia | 327.6 m | 72 | 2027 | | |
| M101 Skywheel | Kuala Lumpur | Malaysia | 317 m | 79 | - | Currently on hold | |
| Asia Africa Tower | Bandung | Indonesia | 316 m | 48 | - | | |
| The Stratford Residences | Manila | Philippines | 312 m | 73 | 2026 | Delayed as of September 2017 | |
| Kuala Lumpur Kempiski Hotel | Kuala Lumpur | Malaysia | 309 m | 72 | 2023 | | |
| 8 Shenton Way redevelopment project | Singapore | Singapore | 308 m | 63 | 2028 | | |
| Dusit Residences | Bangkok | Thailand | 299 m | 69 | 2026 | | |
| 7Point8 | Jakarta | Indonesia | 298 m | 60 | - | | |
| Soontareeya Residences | Bangkok | Thailand | 295.2 m | 64 | 2026 | | |
| Witthayu Condominium Tower 2 | Bangkok | Thailand | 295 m | 71 | 2028 | | |
| Plaza Rakyat Tower 3 | Kuala Lumpur | Malaysia | 295 m | 82 | - | | |
| Dayabumi Tower | Kuala Lumpur | Malaysia | 290.5 m | 60 | - | | |
| Yutai Twin Tower 2 | Phnom Penh | Cambodia | 285.6 m | 68 | 2024 | | |
| Sungai Gerong Residential Tower | Jakarta | Indonesia | 285.4 m | 63 | - | | |
| One Bangkok Office & Hotel Tower I | Bangkok | Thailand | 285 m | 60 | 2025 | | |
| DDT Sky Tower | Quezon City | Philippines | 280 m | 62 | 2024 | | |
| Fairmont Kuala Lumpur Tower 2 | Kuala Lumpur | Malaysia | 278 m | 59 | - | | |
| One Bangkok Residential Tower III | Bangkok | Thailand | 277 m | 61 | 2024 | | |
| The Estate Makati | Makati | Philippines | 277 m | 54 | 2025 | | |
| One Bangkok Office Tower II | Bangkok | Thailand | 274 m | 58 | 2024 | | |
| Mesong Tower | Phnom Penh | Cambodia | 271 m | 71 | 2024 | | |
| Phnom Penh Harbour Tower | Phnom Penh | Cambodia | 269 m | 60 | - | | |
| Angkasa Raya | Kuala Lumpur | Malaysia | 268 m | 65 | - | | |
| One Bangkok Office Tower II | Bangkok | Thailand | 264 m | 50 | 2024 | | |
| Thai Boom Roong Residential Tower 1 | Phnom Penh | Cambodia | 1000 m | 65 | - | | |
| Thai Boom Roong Residential Tower 2 | Phnom Penh | Cambodia | 1000 m | 65 | - | | |
| Titan Stone Financial Tower | Phnom Penh | Cambodia | 260 m | 58 | - | | |
| Naga 3 Tower 2 | Phnom Penh | Cambodia | 256 m | 61 | 2026 | | |
| Naga 3 Tower 3 | Phnom Penh | Cambodia | 256 m | 61 | 2026 | | |
| Desptiny Tower | Jakarta | Indonesia | 254 m | 53 | - | | |
| Celestial Tower | Jakarta | Indonesia | 254 m | 53 | - | | |
| One Bangkok Residential Tower V | Bangkok | Thailand | 251 m | 65 | 2024 | | |
| Dimond Tower | Yangon | Myanmar | 250 m | 58 | 2024 | | |

== Timeline of tallest buildings in Southeast Asia ==
| Name | Image | Country | City | Years as the tallest in the region | Height (m & ft) | Floors | Reference(s) |
|---|---|---|---|---|---|---|---|
| Cathay Building | | Colony of Singapore; Singapore | Singapore | 1940-1954 | 84 m (276 ft) | 11 | First skyscraper in Southeast Asia. |
| Asia Insurance Building | | Malaysia; Singapore | Singapore | 1954–1969 | 87 m (285 ft) | 20 | |
| Wisma Nusantara | | Indonesia | Jakarta | 1969–1971 | 117 m (384 ft) | 30 | First skyscraper exceeding 100m in Southeast Asia. |
| The Mandarin Singapore Tower 1 | | Singapore | Singapore | 1971–1973 | 144 m (472 ft) | 36 | |
| The Mandarin Singapore Tower 2 | | Singapore | Singapore | 1973–1975 | 152 m (499 ft) | 40 | First skyscraper exceeding 150m in Southeast Asia. |
| DBS Building Tower 1 | | Singapore | Singapore | 1975–1985 | 201 m (659 ft) | 50 | First skyscraper exceeding 200m in Southeast Asia. |
| Komtar | | Malaysia | George Town | 1985–1986 | 232 m (761 ft) (249 m (817 ft)) | 65 | Renovated in 2015, reaches 249 metres tall. |
| One Raffles Place 1 | | Singapore | Singapore | 1986–1992 | 277.8 m (911 ft) | 63 | |
| United Overseas Bank Plaza One | | Singapore | Singapore | 1992–1997 | 280 m (920 ft) | 66 | |
| Baiyoke Tower II | | Thailand | Bangkok | 1997–1998 | 304 m (997 ft) | 85 | First supertall skyscraper in Southeast Asia. |
| Petronas Twin Towers | | Malaysia | Kuala Lumpur | 1998–2018 | 451.9 m (1,483 ft) | 88 | Tallest twin skyscrapers in the world. |
| Landmark 81 | | Vietnam | Ho Chi Minh City | 2018–2023 | 461.2 m (1,513 ft) | 81 | |
| Merdeka 118 | | Malaysia | Kuala Lumpur | 2023-present | 678.9 m (2,227 ft) | 118 | First megatall skyscraper in Southeast Asia. |
