= BUMN Tower =

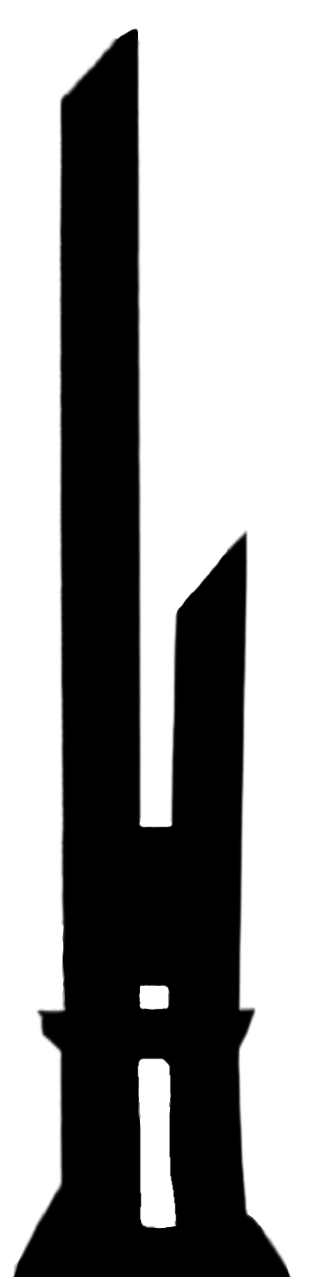
- Interactive map of the BUMN Tower area

General information
- Status: On hold
- Type: Skyscraper
- Location: Nusantara, Indonesia
- Coordinates: 0.962003°S 116.703838°E
- Construction started: August 17, 2025
- Estimated completion: 2045
- Owner: State-owned enterprises of Indonesia

Height
- Antenna spire: 780 m (2,560 ft)
- Roof: 745 m (2,444 ft)

Technical details
- Floor count: 156

Design and construction
- Developer: State-owned enterprises of Indonesia

The BUMN Tower is an on-hold 780 m (2,560 ft) tall megatall-skyscraper planned to be built in Nusantara, Indonesia. Designed as a symbol of national unity and prosperity. The project's status is currently on-hold, with construction halted, with work scheduled to restart on August 17, 2026, leading to public petitions for its completion.

== Development ==
Plans to construct the BUMN Tower was first publicized in September 2020 as a project of the Nusantara city government. If built the tower would be among the tallest structures in the world. The project was being architecually designed by Alien D.C.

With its construction starting in 2025 directly on August 17, 2025, the project was soon put on hold after roughly reaching about 20 storeys, due to the halts and delays of Nusantara city as a whole. However some reports incidate the project is currently being revived resumption scheduled resumation date, with backing from major investors and fundraisers, indicating the construction could resume as early as 2026.

== Facilities ==
BUMN tower is planned to contain a mix of facilities including a shopping mall, hotel, offices, observation deck, and restaurants. The is planned to also have a luxury hotel, plus shops, dining, government and leasable offices, apartments, a swimming pool and an observation deck at its highest levels. Lower floors include retail, a mosque and parking, while the upper levels contain the hotel, offices, and public viewing areas.

== See also ==
- Sinarmas MSIG Tower
- Gama Tower
- Autograph Tower
- Signature Tower Jakarta
- Petronas Towers
- Merdeka 118
- Tower M
- Tradewinds Square Tower
- List of tallest buildings in Indonesia
- List of buildings with 100 floors or more
- List of tallest buildings
