= List of tallest structures in Indonesia =

This is a list of tallest structures in Indonesia by height.

Name	Antenna/pinnacle	Year	Structure type	Place
Indosiar TV Tower	395 metres (1,296 ft)	2006	Guyed mast	Jakarta
Autograph Tower	382.9 metres (1,256 ft)	2022	Skyscraper	Jakarta
Luminary Tower	304 metres (997 ft)	2023	Skyscraper	Jakarta
Gama Tower	288.6 metres (947 ft)	2016	Skyscraper	Jakarta
RCTI TV Tower	275 metres (902 ft)	N/A	Guyed mast	Jakarta
Jakarta Mori Tower	266 metres (872 ft)	2022	Skyscraper	Jakarta
TVRI Tower	144 metres (472 ft)	1977	Reinforced concrete	Jakarta

== See also ==
- List of tallest buildings in Jakarta
- List of tallest buildings in Indonesia
