= List of tallest buildings in Indonesia =

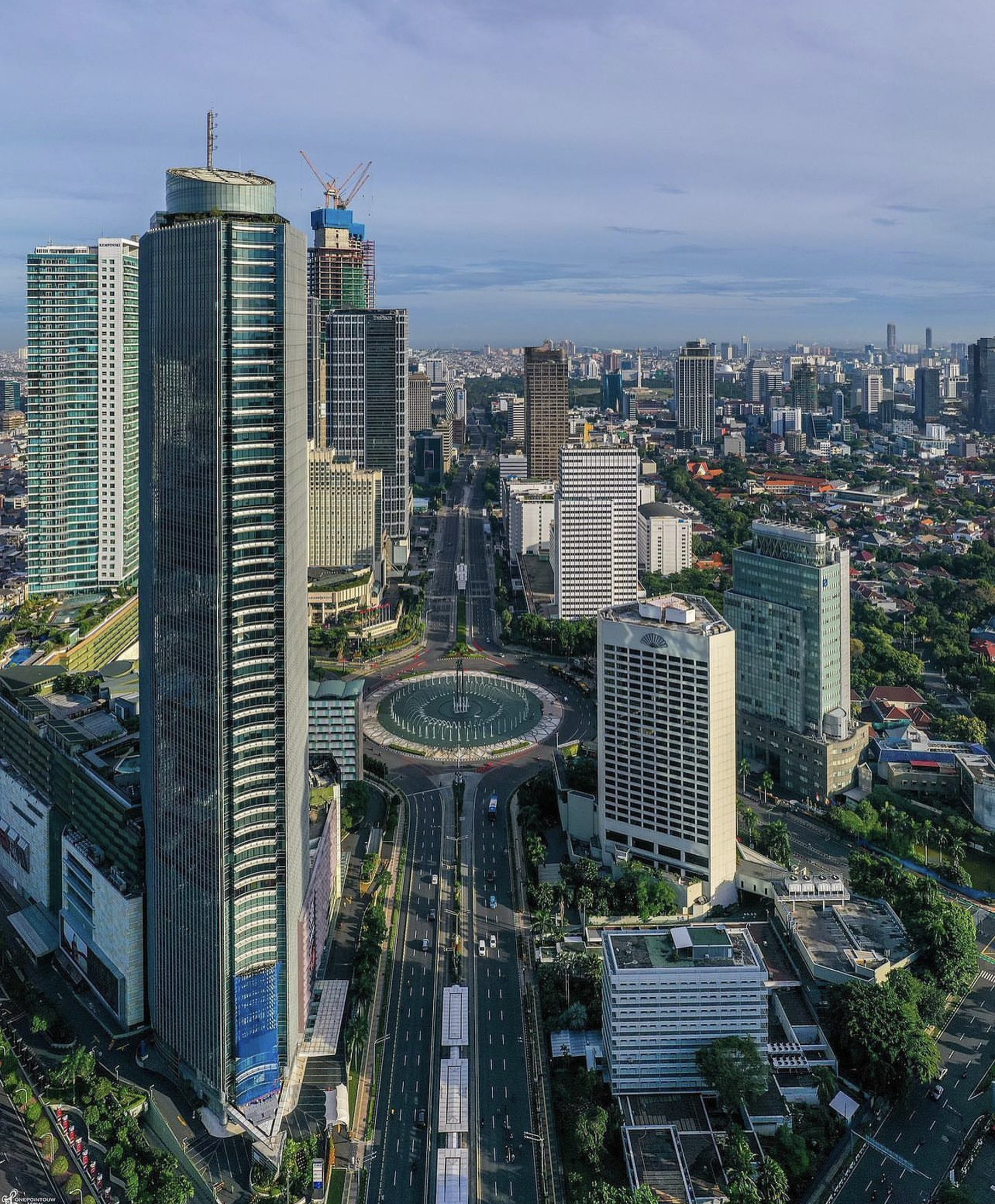
Jakarta, home to most skyscrapers in Indonesia

The Southern Hemisphere's tallest building is Jakarta's 382.9-metre (1,256 ft) tall Autograph Tower.

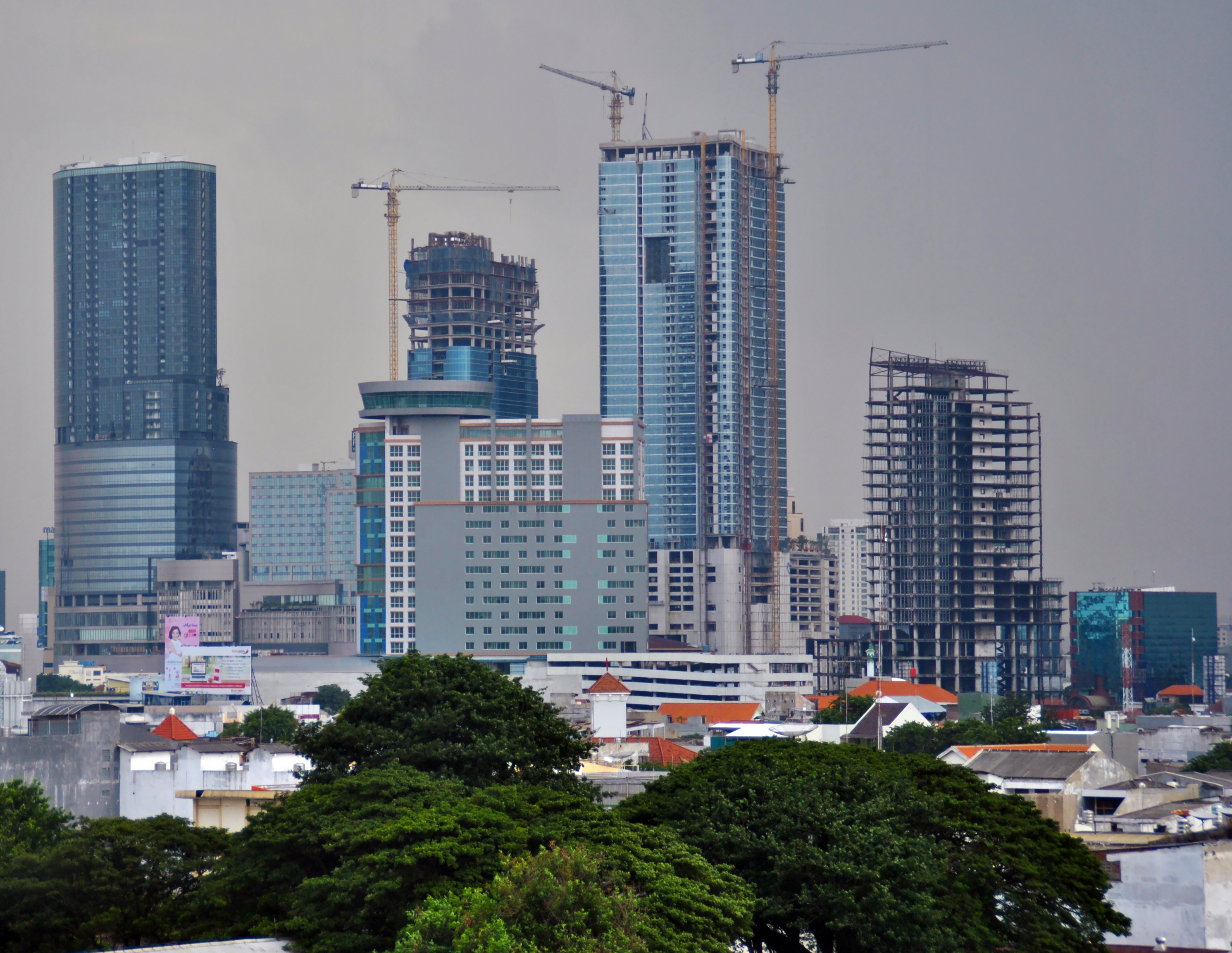
The skyline of Surabaya, which has experienced rapid growth in the number of skyscrapers

This list of tallest buildings in Indonesia ranks skyscrapers in Indonesia by height. There are 88 high-rise buildings (150m+) in Jakarta (the capital city of Indonesia) and its greater areas, and 26 more under construction. Indonesia is ranked in the world by the number of 150m+ completed buildings and 9th in Asia. There are four supertall buildings (300m+) under construction. The average building age is eight years. The first high-rise in Jakarta was Wisma 46 (262 m), which held the longest record, of 20 years, as the highest building in Jakarta. The tallest building in Jakarta is Autograph Tower (383 m) since 2022.

== Tallest buildings ==
Buildings listed here are completed and at least 200 meters in height.

Was Indonesia's tallest building upon completion

Rank	Building	City	Height (m)	Floors	Built	Notes
1	Autograph Tower	Jakarta	382.9	75	2022	Tallest building in Indonesia since 2022 and Southern Hemisphere
2	Luminary Tower	Jakarta	301.2	64	2023	
3	Gama Tower	Jakarta	285.5	64	2016	Tallest building in Indonesia from 2016 to 2022
4	Treasury Tower	Jakarta	279.5	57	2018	
5	Jakarta Mori Tower	Jakarta	265.6	57	2022	
6	Wisma 46	Jakarta	261.9	46	1996	The tallest building in Indonesia from 1996 to 2016
7	Menara Astra	Jakarta	261.5	47	2017	
8	Sahid Sudirman Center	Jakarta	258	59	2015	
9	Raffles Hotel	Jakarta	253.3	52	2015	
10	Millennium Office Tower	Jakarta	250.5	53	2019	
11	The Pakubuwono Signature	Jakarta	252	50	2014	Tallest residential building in Indonesia
12	Trinity Tower	Jakarta	246	49	2021	
13	Sinarmas MSIG Tower	Jakarta	245	48	2015	
14	World Capital Tower	Jakarta	244.3	51	2019	
15	St Regis Hotel and Residence	Jakarta	242.7	55	2021	
16-17	Menara BCA	Jakarta	230	56	2008	
16-17	Casa Domaine Tower 1	Jakarta	230	61	2018	
18	Keraton at The Plaza	Jakarta	225	48	2009	
19	BTPN Tower	Jakarta	223	48	2016	
20	Telkom Landmark Tower 2	Jakarta	220.2	46	2017	
21	Equity Tower	Jakarta	220	44	2010	
22-23	The Peak 1	Jakarta	218.5	55	2006	The tallest twin tower in Indonesia
22-23	The Peak 2	Jakarta	218.5	55	2006	The tallest twin tower in Indonesia
24	The Energy Tower	Jakarta	217	40	2008	
25	Capital Place Office Tower	Jakarta	215.2	47	2016	
26	Kempinski Residences	Jakarta	215	57	2008	
27	Bakrie Tower	Jakarta	214	50	2009	
28	International Financial Centre Tower 2	Jakarta	213.2	49	2016	
29	fX Residence	Jakarta	213	52	2008	
30-32	Ritz-Carlton Jakarta Tower A	Jakarta	212	48	2005	
30-32	Ritz-Carlton Jakarta Tower B	Jakarta	212	48	2005	
30-32	The Tower	Jakarta	212	50	2016	
33	Mangkuluhur City Apartment Tower A	Jakarta	211.5	52	2019	
34	Casa Domaine Tower 2	Jakarta	209.9	57	2018	
35	Pacific Century Place Jakarta	Jakarta	209.3	40	2017	
36	WTC 3	Jakarta	209.1	44	2018	
37	Neo SOHO	Jakarta	209	46	2017	
38-42	SeaView Condominium Tower J	Jakarta	208	48	2015	
38-42	SeaView Condominium Tower K	Jakarta	208	48	2015	
38-42	SeaView Condominium Tower L	Jakarta	208	48	2015	
38-42	SeaView Condominium Tower M	Jakarta	208	48	2015	
38-42	The City Center Tower 1	Jakarta	208	43	2012	
43	Tokopedia Tower	Jakarta	207.4	51	2017	
44	My Home & Ascott Apartment	Jakarta	206.9	49	2014	
45	Sequis Centre Tower	Jakarta	206.3	40	2019	
46-47	Eternity Tower	Jakarta	205	51	2017	
46-47	Infinity Tower	Jakarta	205	51	2015	
48-49	Denpasar Residence 1, Kuningan City	Jakarta	203.2	53	2012	
48-49	Denpasar Residence 2, Kuningan City	Jakarta	203.2	53	2012	
50	Sky57	Jakarta	201.6	50	2022	
51	Tunjungan Plaza 5	Surabaya	201	52	2015	Tallest building outside of Jakarta
52	The Plaza Office Tower	Jakarta	200+	42	2009	
53	Azure Tower	Jakarta	200	77	2024	

== Tallest under construction and proposed ==
=== Under construction ===
This lists buildings that are under construction in Indonesia and are planned to have a height of at least 200 meters.

Building	City	Height (m)	Floors	Planned completion	Notes
Pollux Habibie Financial Center & International Hotel	Batam	400	100	2028	
Icon Tower 1	Jakarta	384	77	2029	Under construction
Oasis Central Sudirman Tower-1	Jakarta	340	75	2028	Under construction
Indonesia-1 North Tower	Jakarta	306	59	2027	Tallest twin towers in Jakarta under construction
Indonesia-1 South Tower	Jakarta	303	55	2027	Tallest twin towers in Jakarta under construction
Breeze Tower	Jakarta	288	53	2025	Under construction
Destiny Tower	Jakarta	254	53	2025	On Hold
Celestial Tower	Jakarta	254	53	2025	On Hold
Hotel Tower	Jakarta	200	45	2028	

=== Proposed ===
Since there are too many proposed buildings in Indonesia, only major supertalls are shown:

Building	City	Height	Floors	Planned completion	Notes
BUMN Tower	Nusantara	780	157	2040	Also known as Menara Kebanggaan Indonesia (Indonesian Pride Tower)
Signature Tower	Jakarta	638	114	2032	Proposed
Pertamina Energy Tower	Jakarta	523	102	2030	Proposed
MC Tower	Jakarta	450	80	–	Proposed
EX Tower	Jakarta	441	98	2020	Never Built (The site was Occupied by Indonesia-1 Tower)
Peruri 88	Jakarta	389	88	–	Proposed
The Pinnacle Mangkuluhur City	Jakarta	386	87	–	Proposed
Arthaloka Tower	Jakarta	360	72	–	Never Built (The site was Occupied by Oasis Central Sudirman Tower-1)
OUE Tower	Jakarta	350	–	–	Proposed
Ciputra World Jakarta 1 Tower 4	Jakarta	350	70	–	Proposed
Mega Kuningan Town Park	Jakarta	320	63	2010	Considered to be a stale proposal
Sentra BDNI Tower A	Jakarta	317	62	–	Demolished (New Project is coming soon)
Asia Africa Tower	Bandung	316	48	–	Proposed
Indonesia Financial Center Tower A	Jakarta	304		2021	Proposed
Indonesia Financial Center Tower B	Jakarta	304		2021	Proposed
Menara Panin Bank	Jakarta	300+	70	–	Proposed
Sampoerna Strategic Square 2	Jakarta	300+	72		
BRI Tower	Jakarta	300+	80	–	Proposed
Abode Sudirman Place	Jakarta	300; 275	60; 55	2021	Proposed
7Point8	Jakarta	298	60	2025+	Proposed
Sungai Gerong Residential Tower	Jakarta	285.4	63	–	Proposed
World Financial Tower	Jakarta	250	50+	–	Proposed
Cyber Estate Tower	Jakarta	240	60	–	
Bumiputera Tower	Jakarta	230	63	–	
SSI Tower	Jakarta	212	–	–	Proposed

== Timeline of tallest buildings ==
Buildings which once held the title of tallest building in Indonesia, as well as the current tallest as of August 2025.

Name	Height m	Floor	Years as the tallest	Location	Image	Notes
Sarinah Building	74	15	1962–1967	Jakarta		The first Tallest building and Mall in Indonesia.
Wisma Nusantara	117	30	1967–1983	Jakarta		Tallest building in Southeast Asia upon completion.
Graha Mandiri	143	32	1983–1996	Jakarta		The first tallest building in indonesia outside Jl. M.H. Thamrin.
Wisma 46	261.9	46	1996–2016	Jakarta		Was the second tallest building in the Southern Hemisphere upon completion.
Gama Tower	285.5	64	2016–2022	Jakarta		The first tallest building in Indonesia outside the Central Jakarta.
Autograph Tower	382.9	75	2022-now	Jakarta		The tallest building in the Southern Hemisphere upon completion.

== See also ==
- List of tallest buildings in Jakarta
- List of tallest buildings in Batam
- List of tallest buildings in Surabaya
- List of tallest buildings in Medan
- List of tallest structures in Indonesia
- Top reviewed places in ASEAN
