= 2016 in architecture =

The year 2016 in architecture involved some significant architectural events and new buildings.

== Buildings and structures ==
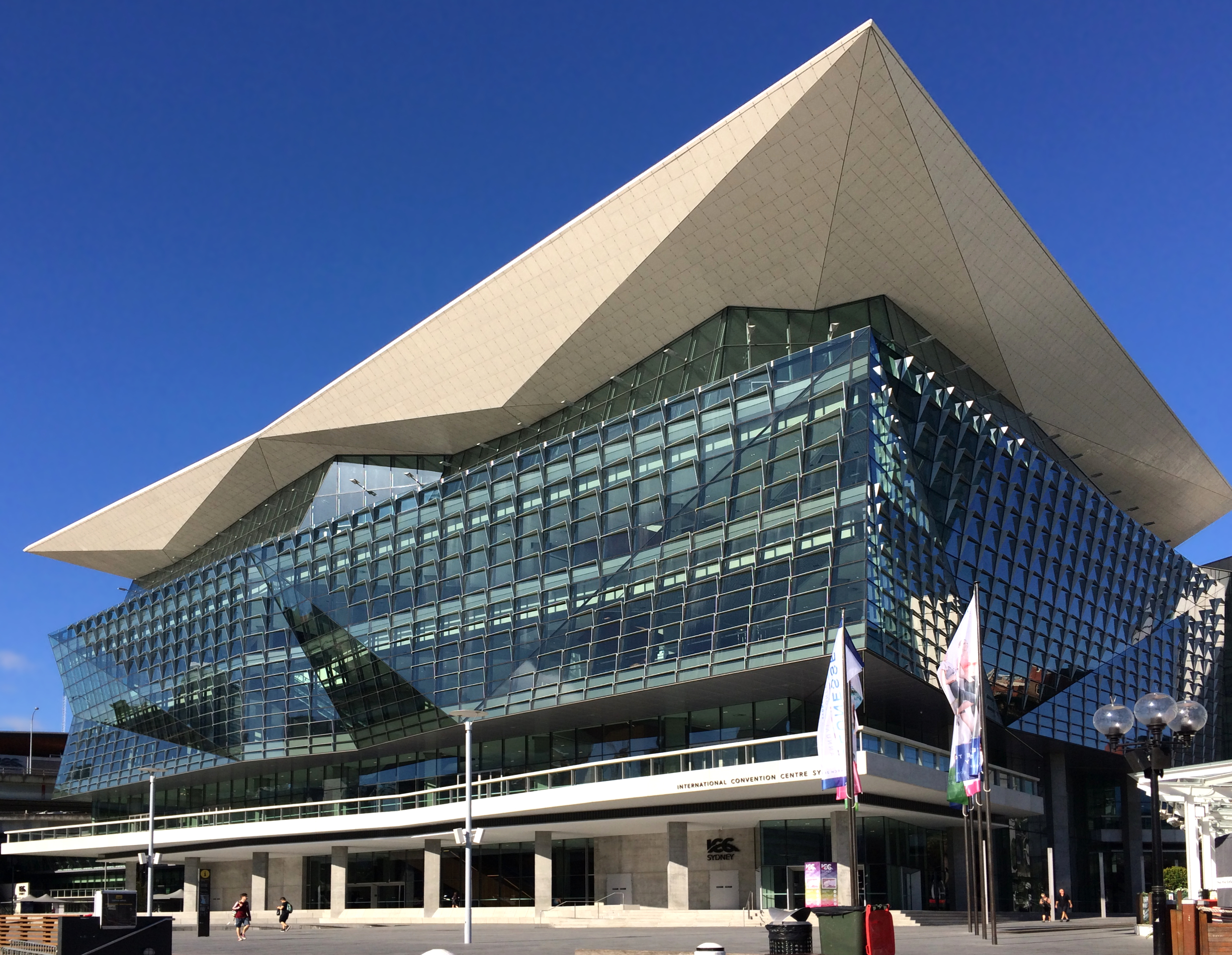
International Convention Centre Sydney, Australia

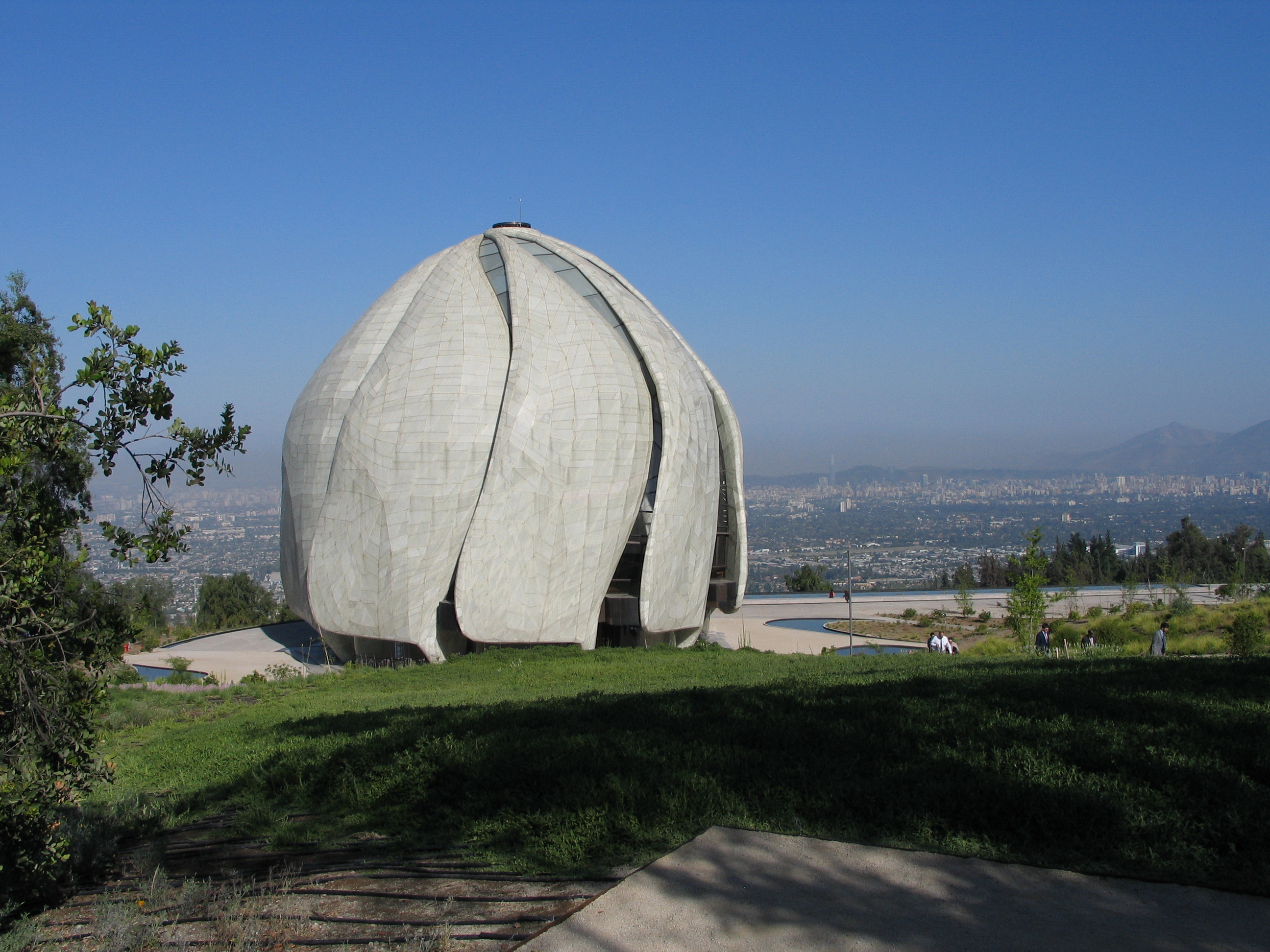
Templo Baháʼí near Santiago, Chile

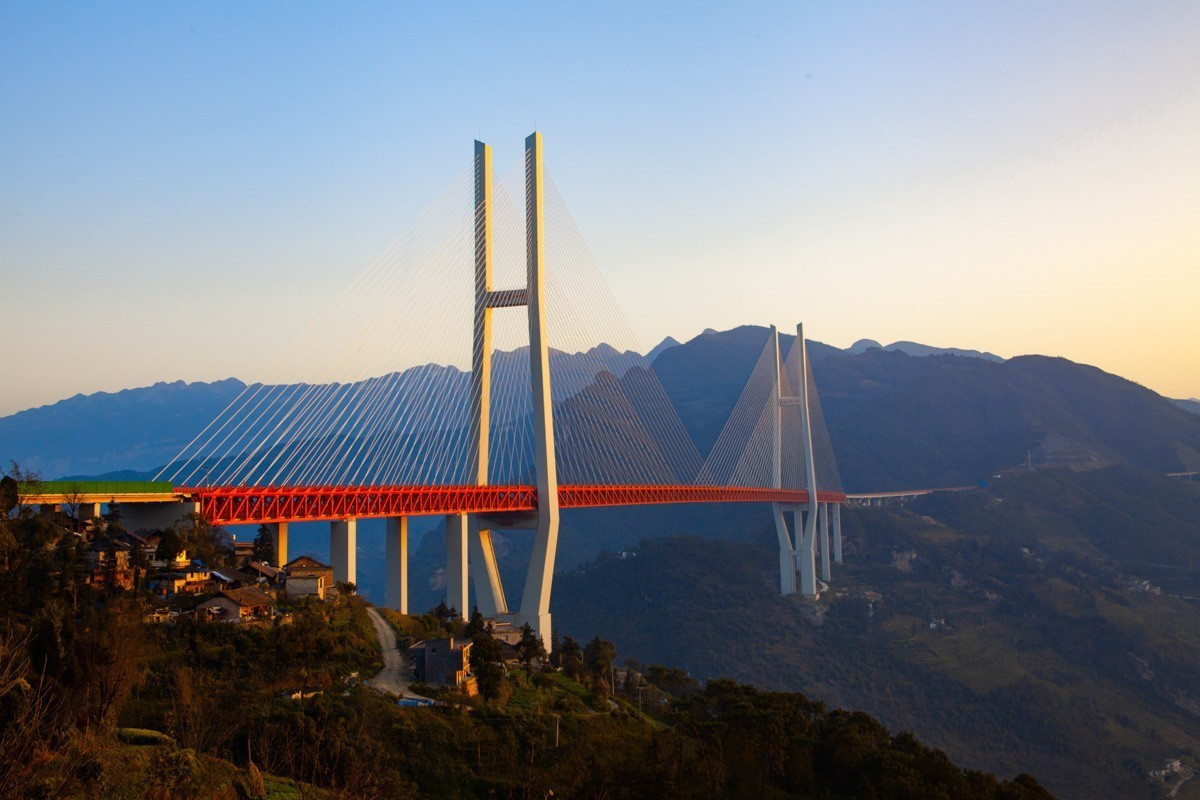
Duge Bridge, China

Cité du Vin, Bordeaux, France

Gama Tower in Jakarta, Indonesia

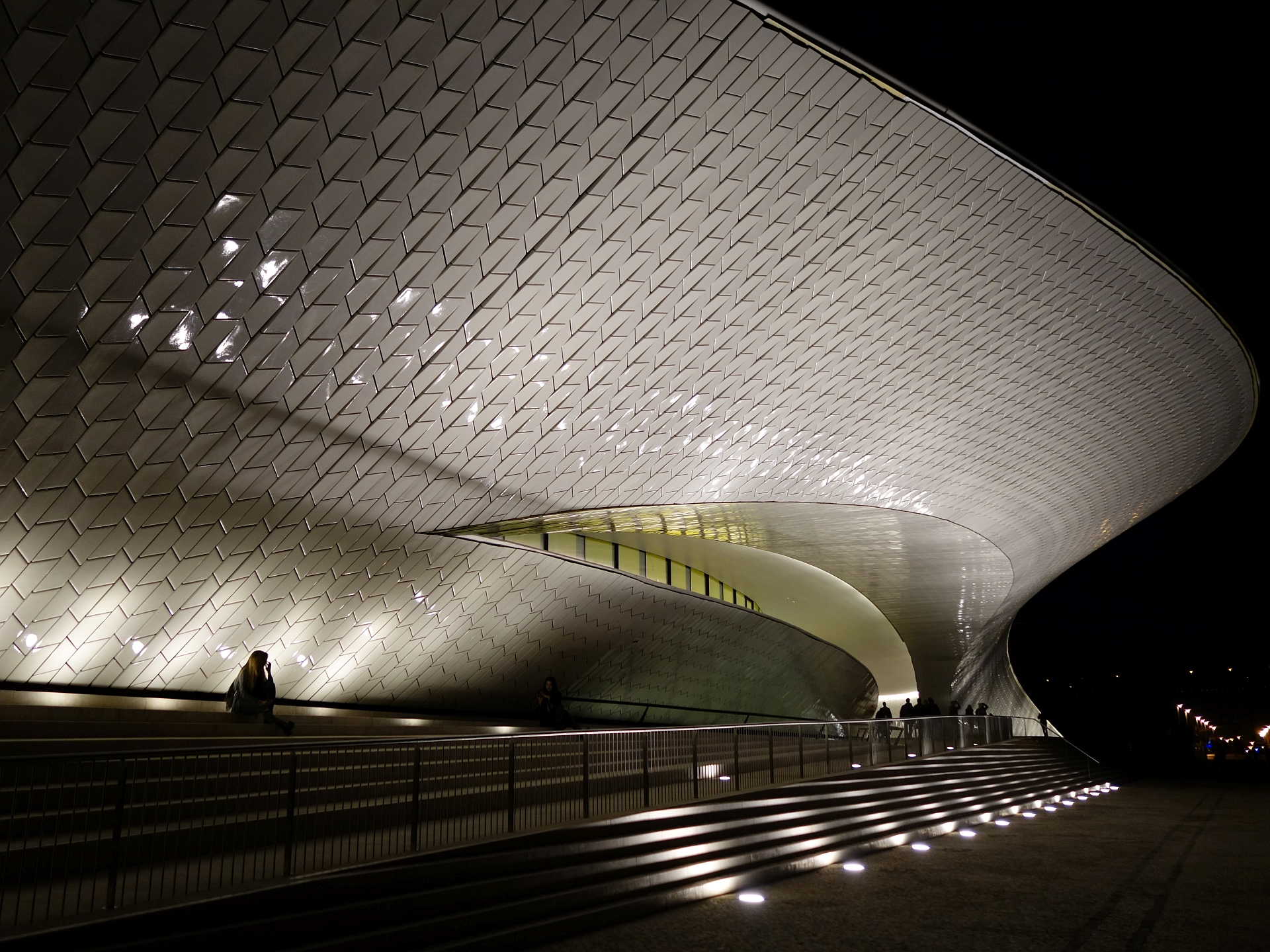
The Museum of Art, Architecture and Technology in Lisbon, Portugal

Australia

- International Convention Centre Sydney opened.
- October – 1 William Street, the tallest building in Brisbane (2016–2019), designed by Woods Bagot, is completed.

Chile

- October 19 – The Baháʼí House of Worship in Santiago, designed by Siamak Hariri, opened.

China

- Dacheng Muslim Cultural Center, by He Jingtang opens.
- December 29 – Duge Bridge, the highest bridge in the world (2016–present), opened.

France

- May 31 – Cité du Vin, Bordeaux, opened.

Germany

- BND Headquarters (Federal Intelligence Service) in Berlin projected for completion in January.
- Dom-Römer Project for old town reconstruction in Frankfurt projected for completion.
- October 23 – Parochialkirche church tower reconstruction in Berlin is completed.

Greece

- Stavros Niarchos Foundation Cultural Center designed by Renzo Piano is completed.

Indonesia

- Gama Tower, the tallest building in Jakarta (2016–present), Indonesia, is opened.

Italy

- BNL BNP Paribas headquarters, Rome, designed by 5+1AA (Alfonso Femia and Gianluca Peluffo), is completed.

Malta

- April 28 – The reconstructed Wignacourt Arch is inaugurated.

Peru

- Paracas Museum (Museo de Sitio de Paracas) on Paracas Peninsula, by designed by Barclay & Crousse, is built.

Poland

- May 12 – Warsaw Spire, the second tallest building in Warsaw and Poland (2016-present), is completed.

Portugal

- October 5 – Museum of Art, Architecture and Technology (MAAT), Lisbon, designed by Amanda Levete of AL A.

South Korea

- December 22 – Lotte World Tower, the tallest building in Seoul and South Korea (2016–present), is completed.

Sri Lanka

- September – Anantara Kalutara Resort, Kalutara projected for completion to a design by Geoffrey Bawa (d. 2003).

Thailand

- August 29 – MahaNakhon opens in Bangkok.

Turkey

- August 26 – Yavuz Sultan Selim Bridge the second tallest suspension bridge in the world opened.

United Arab Emirates

- August 31 – Dubai Opera opened.

United Kingdom

- April 27 – Hastings Pier reconstruction, designed by Alex de Rijke of dRMM Architects, opened (Stirling Prize winner 2017).
- May 21 – Command of the Oceans at Chatham Historic Dockyard, designed by Baynes and Mitchell Architects, opened.
- June 17 – Tate Modern Switch House (art gallery extension, subsequently named Blavatnik Building) on London Bankside, designed by Herzog & de Meuron, opened.
- August 4 – British Airways i360 observation tower, Brighton, designed by Marks Barfield, opened.
- September
  - Art and Design Building, Bedales School, Steep, Hampshire, designed by Feilden Clegg Bradley Studios.
  - City Campus, City of Glasgow College, Scotland, designed by Reiach and Hall Architects and Michael Laird Architects.
  - Ineos headquarters building at Grangemouth, Scotland, designed by Michael Laird Architects, completed.
  - Barrett's Grove (apartments), Stoke Newington, London, designed by Groupwork and Amin Taha.
- October – Photography studio for Juergen Teller, London, designed by 6a Architects.
- October 20 – Victoria Gate shopping arcade, Leeds, designed by Acme Space, opened.
- November 24 – Holland Green (apartment blocks) in the London Borough of Kensington, designed by Reinier de Graaf of Rem Koolhaas's Office for Metropolitan Architecture (OMA) and interior refurbishment of the adjacent 1962 Commonwealth Institute building by John Pawson as new premises for the Design Museum, opened.
- December 8 – Winton Gallery at Science Museum, London, designed by Zaha Hadid.

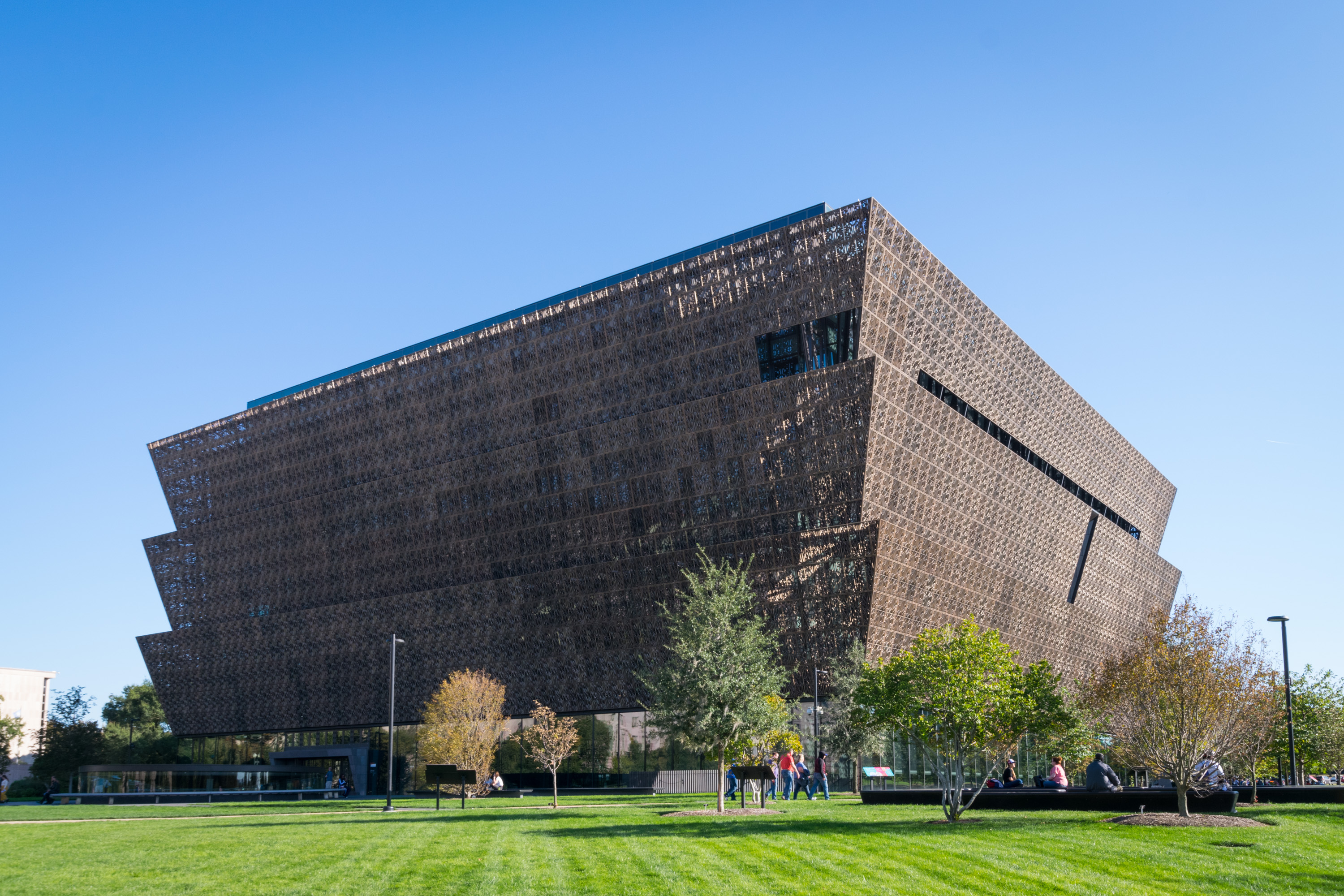
National Museum of African American History and Culture in Washington, D.C., USA

- Goldsmith Street public housing (passive houses) in Norwich, designed by Mikhail Riches and Cathy Hawley.
- House for Rowan Atkinson near Ipsden, Oxfordshire, designed by Richard Meier & Partners Architects with Berman Guedes Stretton and Roger Stretton.
- Incurvo (private house) near Goring-on-Thames, Oxfordshire, designed by Adrian James Architects.

United States

- May 26 — Klarman Hall at Cornell University, designed by Koetter Kim & Associates
- September 24 – National Museum of African American History and Culture in Washington, D.C., designed by David Adjaye opened.
- March 4 – World Trade Center Transportation Hub in New York City opened.

== Awards ==
- AIA Gold Medal – Denise Scott Brown and Robert Venturi
- Architecture Firm Award AIA – LMN Architects
- Carbuncle Cup – Lincoln Plaza
- Driehaus Architecture Prize for New Classical Architecture – Scott Merrill
- Emporis Skyscraper Award – VIA 57 West
- Lawrence Israel Prize – SHoP Architects
- Praemium Imperiale Architecture Laureate – Paulo Mendes da Rocha
- Pritzker Architecture Prize – Alejandro Aravena
- RAIA Gold Medal – ARM Architecture
- RIBA Royal Gold Medal – Zaha Hadid
- RIBA Stirling Prize – Caruso St John Architects for Newport Street Gallery
- Thomas Jefferson Medal in Architecture – Cecil Balmond
- Twenty-five Year Award by AIA – Monterey Bay Aquarium by EHDD

== Exhibitions ==
- March 18 – July 31: "A Japanese Constellation: Toyo Ito, SANAA, and Beyond at MOMA in New York City".
- May 28 – November 16: "TIME-SPACE-EXISTENCE" at the Palazzo Bembo, Palazzo Mora and Palazzo Rossini in Venice, Italy.

== Deaths ==
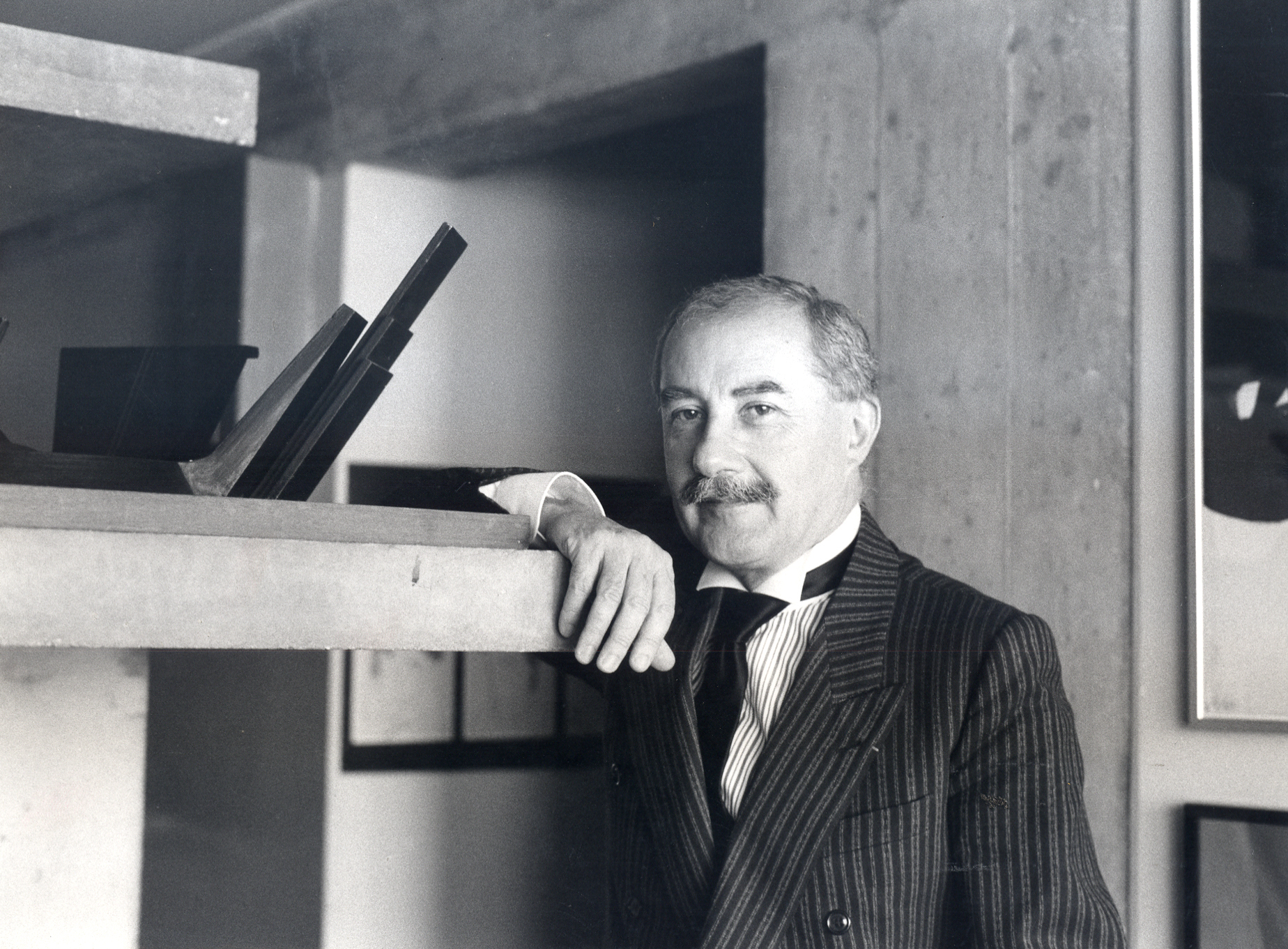
Claude Parent

- February 1 – Paul Pholeros, Australian architect (b. 1953)
- February 16 – Bořek Šípek, Czech architect and designer (b. 1949)
- February 27 – Claude Parent, French architect (b. 1923)
- March 31 – Zaha Hadid, 65, Iraqi-born British architect (b. 1950)
- May 16 – Romaldo Giurgola, 95, Italian-born American-Australian architect (b. 1920)
- June 8 – Michael Manser, 87, British architect (b. 1929)
- July 26 – Eric Kuhne, 64, American-born British architect (b. 1951)
- August 19 – Peter Blundell Jones, 67, British architectural historian (b. 1949)
- September – John Belle, 84, American architect (b. 1932)
- September 16 – Teodoro González de León, 90, Mexican architect (b. 1926)
- October 4 – Bing Thom, 75, Hong Kong born Canadian architect (b. 1940)
- November 14 – Diana Balmori, 84, Spanish born Argentinian-American landscape designer (b. 1932)
- November 15 – Sixto Durán-Ballén 95, American-born Ecuadorian politician (President of Ecuador 1992–1996) and architect (b. 1921)
- December 1 – Peter Corrigan, 74–75, Australian architect (b, 1941)
- December 13 – Roy Harrover, 88, American architect (b. 1928)

== See also ==
- Timeline of architecture
