= Rajawali Place =

Coordinates: 6.209064°S 106.825177°E

- Interactive map of the Rajawali Place area

General information
- Type: Hotel; Commercial offices Residential
- Architectural style: Modern
- Location: Jl. Setiabudi Selatan, Blok D, No.1-2-3, Jakarta, Indonesia
- Construction started: 2016
- Completed: 2019

Height
- Top floor: 244 m (801 ft); 135 m (443 ft)

Technical details
- Floor count: 65x 1 floors x 1; 30 floors x 1

Design and construction
- Architect: Gensler
- Developer: PT Rajawali Group
- Structural engineer: Ramboll Group
- Main contractor: PT.POSCO E&C INDONESIA

Rajawali Place is a mixed development complex under construction in Setiabudi, Jakarta, Indonesia. The complex has two skyscrapers: The St. Regis Jakarta Hotel and Rajawali Place office tower. The complex has a land area of 2.3 hectares. The site was formerly occupied by the Four Seasons Jakarta, which relocated to Capital Place Jakarta. The West Setia Budi Reservoir is located in front of the complex.

The tallest skyscraper of the complex has 65 floors above ground and is 244 meters high. It houses St. Regis Jakarta Hotel & Residence. The office tower is 135 meters tall and has 30 floors above ground.

== See also ==
- List of tallest buildings in Indonesia
- List of tallest buildings in Jakarta
