= West Vista =

Coordinates: 6.157906°S 106.726351°E

- West Vista at Puri
- Interactive map of the West Vista area

General information
- Type: Residential
- Architectural style: Modern
- Location: Jalan Lingkar Luar No.8, Duri Kosambi, Cengkareng, Jakarta, Indonesia
- Construction started: 2015
- Completed: 2018

Technical details
- Floor count: 48 floors x 2

Design and construction
- Developer: Keppel Land Limited
- Main contractor: PT Acset Indonusa, Tbk. (ACSET)

West Vista is a twin towers skyscraper in Cengkareng, Jakarta, Indonesia. The 48 floors residential twin towers is part of an 8 hectares complex, of which 3 hectares are occupied by this building of 2855 apartment units. Singapore-based Keppel Land Limited is the developer of the complex. It was certified by the Green Mark Gold Building and Construction Authority of Singapore (BCA) in February 2017 to acknowledge environmentally friendly architectural and construction standards. The towers were topped off in May 2017.

== See also ==
- List of tallest buildings in Indonesia
- List of tallest buildings in Jakarta
