= List of tallest buildings in Jakarta =

The Autograph Tower, the tallest building in Jakarta. To the right is the Luminary Tower, the second tallest. Both are part of the Thamrin Nine complex.

Jakarta is the capital and largest city of Indonesia. The city is a blend as well as contrast of business districts with modern skyscrapers and kampungs with traditional Indonesian style architecture. Jakarta has architecturally significant buildings in a wide range of styles spanning distinct historical and cultural periods. Architectural styles reflect Malay, Javanese, Arabic, Chinese and Dutch influences.

In December 2019, there were 964 highrise buildings and 244 skyscrapers in Jakarta. The city has 127 completed skyscrapers with (150m+) height and another 52 more under construction. At present four supertall buildings (300m+) are being constructed in the city and another five supertall buildings are in proposal stage. Average age of the buildings of the city is about 8 years. Jakarta has more highrise buildings than that of Beijing. There are many other highrise and skyscrapers within Greater Jakarta outside DKI Jakarta, which are not included in this article. As of July 2021, there are 46 skyscrapers in Jakarta, which are taller than 200 meters. Jakarta has the highest numbers of 200-meter-plus skyscrapers among Southeast Asian cities. Seven 200-meter-plus skyscrapers were completed in 2015 in Jakarta, which was the highest among the cities in the world during that year. The city ranked third in the world by completing five 200-meter-plus skyscrapers during 2017.

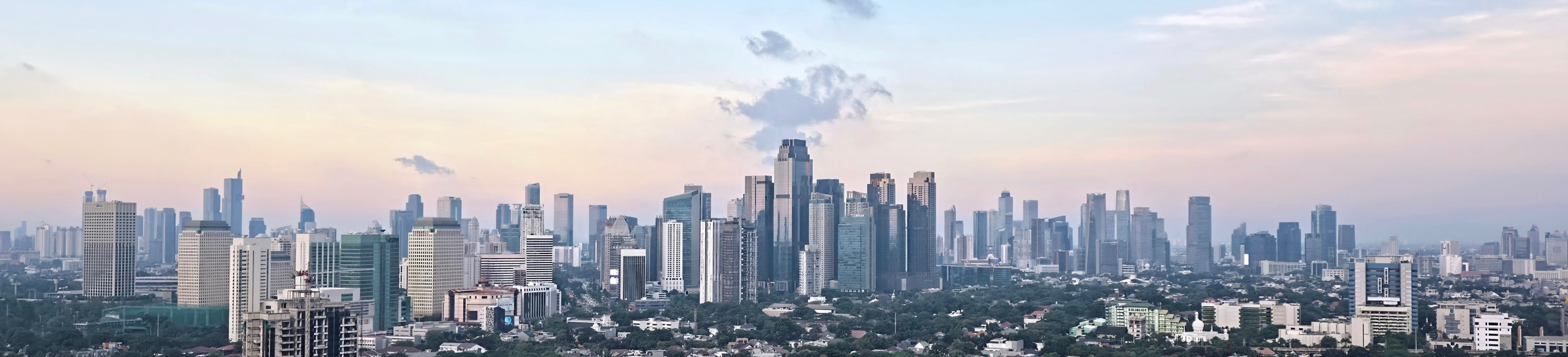
Panoramic view of skyscrapers at the Golden Triangle of Jakarta

The first high rise building in the city was Sarinah, which was built in 1963. The first building over 100m in Jakarta was Wisma Nusantara, which was built in 1967 and was the tallest building in Southeast Asia at that time Between 1983 and 1996, the tallest building in the city was Graha Mandiri. The first skyscraper above 250 meters height is Wisma 46 (262 m), which was constructed in 1996 and held the 'unbeatable' record of being the tallest building for nearly 20 years. As of October 2021, Autograph Tower is the tallest building and Indosiar Television Tower is the tallest structure in Jakarta, as well as in Indonesia.

Most of the tallest skyscrapers are located within the Golden Triangle of Jakarta, along main avenues such as Jalan M.H. Thamrin, Jalan Jenderal Sudirman, Jalan Gatot Subroto and Jalan H.R. Rasuna Said. Clusters of high-rise buildings are located at SCBD, Mega Kuningan, Puri Indah, Kuningan Persada and along T. B. Simatupang Avenue. The Golden Triangle of Jakarta is one of the fastest evolving CBDs in the Asia-Pacific region.

This list of tallest buildings in Jakarta ranks skyscrapers in the Special Capital Region of Jakarta. Skyscrapers of Greater Jakarta outside DKI Jakarta are not included in this list.

== Tallest buildings ==
This list ranks completed and architecturally topped out buildings in Jakarta with a minimum height of 150 meters based on standard height measurement. Highrises and skyscrapers of Greater Jakarta outside DKI Jakarta are not included in this list. This includes spires and architectural details but does not include antenna masts. The "Year" column indicates the year in which a building was completed.

Rank	Name	Image	Height m	Floors	Year	Notes
1	Autograph Tower		382.9	83	2022	Tallest building in Indonesia and Southern Hemisphere
2	Luminary Tower		304	64	2023	T/O
3	Gama Tower		288.6	64	2016	Tallest building in Indonesia from 2016 to 2022
4	Azure Tower		288	77	2024	
5	Treasury Tower		279.5	57	2018	
6	The Jakarta Mori Tower		266	59	2022	
7	Wisma 46		261.9	51	1996	The tallest building in Indonesia from 1996 to 2016
8	Menara Astra		261.5	49	2017	
9-10	Millennium Office Tower		254	53	2019	
9-10	Equinox Tower		254	56	2022	T/O
11	Raffles Hotel		253.3	52	2014	
12	The Pakubuwono Signature		252	50	2014	Tallest residential building in Indonesia
13	Trinity Tower		246	50	2021	
14	World Capital Tower		244.3	52	2017	
15	St Regis Hotel and Residence		244	62	2021	T/O
16	Sahid Sudirman Center		239.8	52	2015	
17-19	Sinarmas MSIG Tower		230	48	2014	
17-19	Menara BCA		230	56	2007	
17-19	Casa Domaine Tower 1		230	60	2016	
20	Keraton at The Plaza		225	48	2009	
21	Mangkuluhur City Apartment Tower A		224	52	2017	
22	BTPN Tower		223	48	2016	
23	Telkom Landmark Tower 2		220.2	52	2016	
24	Equity Tower		220	44	2010	
25-26	The Peak 1		219	55	2008	The tallest twin tower in Indonesia
25-26	The Peak 2		219	55	2008	The tallest twin tower in Indonesia
27-29	Denpasar Residence 1, Kuningan City		218	58	2012	
27-29	Denpasar Residence 2, Kuningan City		218	58	2012	
27-29	Capital Place Office Tower		218	48	2015	
30	The Energy Tower		217	40	2008	
31	Kempinski Residences		215	58	2008	
32	Bakrie Tower		214	50	2009	
33-34	International Financial Centre Tower 2		213	48	2015	
33-34	fX Residence		213	52	2006	
35-37	Ritz-Carlton Jakarta Tower A		212	48	2005	
35-37	Ritz-Carlton Jakarta Tower B		212	48	2005	
35-37	The Tower		212	50	2015	
38	PCPD Tower		211	42	2017	
39-40	My Home & Ascott Apartment		210	52	2013	
39-40	Sequis Centre Tower		210	41	2017	
41	Casa Domaine Tower 2		209.9	57	2016	
42	WTC 3		209	42	2017	
43-49	SeaView Condominium Tower J		208	48	2015	
43-49	SeaView Condominium Tower K		208	48	2015	
43-49	SeaView Condominium Tower L		208	48	2015	
43-49	SeaView Condominium Tower M		208	48	2015	
43-49	The City Center Tower 1		208	47	2012	
43-49	The Plaza Office Tower		208	46	2009	
43-49	Residence 8 @ Senopati Tower A		208	51	2008	
50	Tokopedia Tower		207.4	51	2016	
51-53	Residence 8 @ Senopati Tower B		205	51	2008	
51-53	Eternity Tower		205	51	2015	
51-53	Infinity Tower		205	51	2015	
54	The Sky		201.6	50	2022	
55	Axa Tower Jakarta, Kuningan City		201	45	2012	
56	Neo SOHO		200+	45	2016	
57	SOHO capital		200+	47	2016	
58	West Vista Puri		200+	48	2017	T/O
59	Chitaland Tower		196.1	40	2020	
60	Wisma Mulia		195	54	2003	
61-62	UOB Plaza		194	42	2009	
61-62	DBS Tower		194	37	2013	
63	Anandamaya Residences 1		192	47	2017	
64-65	One Pacific Place		190	37	2007	
64-65	MNC Media Tower		190	39	2017	
66-68	Central Park Apartment Tower 1		188	49	2010	
66-68	Central Park Apartment Tower 2		188	49	2010	
66-68	Central Park Apartment Tower 3		188	49	2010	
69	Thamrin Executive Residence		183	45	2012	
69	Menera Palma 2		181	34	2017	
70-71	Pacific Place Residences East Tower		180	39	2007	
70-71	Pacific Place Residences West Tower		180	38	2007	
72-74	The St Moritz Presidential Suite Tower 1		179	44	2012	
72-74	Anandamaya Residences 2		179	44	2017	
72-74	Anandamaya Residences 3		179	44	2017	
75-76	The Orchard Satrio		171	44	2017	
75-76	The Residence Satrio		171	44	2017	
77	Menara Kadin Indonesia		169	37	1997	
78-85	Central Park Office Tower		167	41	2011	
78-85	Botanica Apartment II		167	41	2015	
78-85	Botanica Apartment III		167	41	2015	
78-85	The St Moritz Presidential Suite Tower 2		167	41	2016	
78-85	The Cosmopolitan Tower		167	41	2013	
78-85	The Bloomington		167	41	2013	
78-85	The Tiffany		167	41	2013	
78-85	Sky Tower		167	41	2014	
78-85	Aston Hotel Jakarta 1		167	41	1996	
78-85	Ancol Mansion 1		167	41	2011	
78-85	Ancol Mansion 2		167	41	2011	
78-85	Sopo Del Tower A		167	41	2017	
78-85	Central Park Office Tower		167	41	2011	
86	Centennial Tower		164	40	2016	
87-89	City Lofts		163	40	2007	
87-89	AIA Central		163	40	2015	
87-89	The Grove Tower 1		163	40	2015	
90	Office 8		161	41	2017	
91-92	Plaza BII Tower II		160	32	2011	
91-92	World Trade Center Tower II		160	39	2012	
93-94	Botanica Apartment Tower I		159	39	2015	
93-94	Lacewood Tower		159	39	2011	
95-97	The St Moritz Office Tower 1		158	42	2017	
95-97	Sudirman Square Tower A		158	33	1997	
95-97	Sudirman Square Tower B		158	33	1997	
98	Holland Village Office Tower		156.8	35	2021	
99	Cyber 2 Tower		156	32	2009	
100-102	Indofood Tower		155	38	2008	
100-102	Mid Plaza Hotel Tower		155	37	1997	
100-102	BRI Gatot Subrato Tower			37	2021	
103	Mangkuluhur City Office Tower One		152	33	2020	
104-110	Taman Anggrek I		151	46	1998	
104-110	Taman Anggrek II		151	46	1998	
104-110	Taman Anggrek III		151	46	1998	
104-110	Taman Anggrek IV		151	46	1998	
104-110	Taman Anggrek V		151	46	1998	
104-110	Taman Anggrek VI		151	46	1998	
104-110	Taman Anggrek VII		151	46	1998	
104-110	Taman Anggrek VIII		151	46	1998	
111-128	Menara BNI		150	34	2019	
111-128	Dukuh Golf Apartment Tower 1		150	37	2016	
111-128	Dukuh Golf Apartment Tower 2		150	37	2016	
111-128	Dukuh Golf Apartment Tower 3		150	37	2016	
111-128	Dukuh Golf Apartment Tower 4		150	37	2016	
111-128	Kemayoran Office Tower 1		150	37	2016	
111-128	Kemayoran Office Tower 2		150	37	2016	
111-128	Kemayoran Office Tower 3		150	37	2016	
111-128	Royal Springfield Residence 5		150	37	2015	
111-128	Royal Springfield Residence 6		150	37	2015	
111-128	Lotus		150	37	2015	
111-128	Lavender		150	37	2015	
111-128	Magnolia		150	37	2015	
111-128	Marygold		150	37	2015	
111-128	Aston Hotel Jakarta II		150	37	1996	
111-128	ITC Kuningan		150	37	1998	
111-128	The City Tower		150	32	2007	
111-128	Fairmont Hotel		150	32	2015	

== Tallest under construction or proposed ==
=== Under construction ===
This list comprises highrise buildings that are under construction in Jakarta and are planned to rise at least 150 meters. Under construction buildings that have already been topped out are also included.

Name	Height Architectural (m)	Floors	Expected year of completion (est.)	Notes
Icon Tower 1	384	77	2029	On Hold
Oasis Central Sudirman Tower-1	340	75	2028	Under construction (U/C)
Indonesia-1 North Tower	306	59	2027	Tallest twin towers in Jakarta currently under construction
Indonesia-1 South Tower	303.5	55	2027	Tallest twin towers in Jakarta currently under construction
Breeze Tower	288	53	2024	Under construction (U/C)
Destiny Tower	254	53	2024	On Hold
Celestial Tower	254	53	2024	On Hold
Sky 57	201.6; 97.7	50; 25	2022	Completed
Branz Mega Kunigan	180; 135	44; 35	2023	Completed
Newton 2	175	42	2021	Under construction (U/C)
Regatta Hotel	163	40	2021	Under construction (U/C)
Holland Village Office Tower and Apartment Tower	170; 170; 165	44; 44; 36	2021	To be built at Holland Village Complex

=== Proposed ===
This lists buildings that are proposed in Jakarta and are planned to rise at least 200 meters.

Name	Height m	Floors	Year (est.)	Notes
BUMN Tower	707	155	-	Also known as Menara Kebanggaan Indonesia (Indonesian Pride Tower).
Signature Tower	638	114	2032	Proposed
Pertamina Energy Tower	523	99	2030	Proposed
MC Tower	450	80	-	Proposed
EX Tower	441	98	2020	Never Built (The site was Occupied by Indonesia-1 Tower)
Peruri 88	389	88	-	Proposed
The Pinnacle Mangkuluhur City	386	87	-	Proposed
Arthaloka Tower	360	72	-	Never Built (The site was Occupied by Oasis Central Sudirman Tower-1)
OUE Tower	350	-	-	Proposed
Ciputra World Jakarta 1 Tower 4	350	70	-	Proposed
Mega Kuningan Town Park	320	63	2010	Considered to be a stale proposal
Sentra BDNI Tower A	317	62	-	Demolished (New Project is coming soon)
Indonesia Financial Center Tower A	304		2021	Proposed
Indonesia Financial Center Tower B	304		2021	Proposed
Menara Panin Bank	300+	70	-	Proposed
Sampoerna Strategic Square 2	300+	72		
BRI Tower	300+	80	-	Proposed
Abode Sudirman Place	300; 275	60; 55	2021	Proposed
7Point8	298	60	2025+	Proposed
Sungai Gerong Residential Tower	285.4	63	-	Proposed
World Financial Tower	250	50+	-	Proposed
Cyber Estate Tower	240	60	-	
Bumiputera Tower	230	63	-	
SSI Tower	212	-	-	Proposed
Kompas Gramedia Tower	200+	±50	-	Proposed
PRJ Towers		52; 49	-	Proposed
Pakubuwono Patra		50+ 50+	-	Proposed
Wisma Kosgoro Redevelopment	150+	40	-	Proposed
Grand Sahid Plaza		50		

== Timeline of tallest buildings ==
Buildings which were once held the title of tallest building in Jakarta. Autograph Tower is also included in this list, which surpassed Gama Tower in 2022.

Name	Height m	Floor	Years as the tallest	Image	Notes
Sarinah Building	74	15	1962–1967		The first Tallest building and Mall in Indonesia.
Wisma Nusantara	117	30	1967–1983		Tallest building in Southeast Asia upon completion.
Graha Mandiri	143	32	1983–1996		
Wisma 46	262	51	1996–2016		Was the second tallest building in the Southern Hemisphere upon completion.
Gama Tower	289	63	2016–2022		
Autograph Tower	383	72	2022–Present		The tallest building in the Southern Hemisphere.

== See also ==
- List of cities with the most skyscrapers
- List of tallest buildings in Indonesia
- List of tallest buildings in Batam
- List of tallest buildings in Surabaya
- List of tallest buildings in Medan
- List of tallest structures in Indonesia
- Top reviewed places in ASEAN
