= Casa Domaine Towers =

Coordinates: 6.199813°S 106.815303°E

Casa Domaine
- Interactive map of the Casa Domaine area

General information
- Type: Residential
- Location: Jakarta, Indonesia, Jalan Kh. Mas Mansyur Kav. 1,Tanah Abang
- Construction started: 2013
- Completed: 2017

Height
- Architectural: 230 m (750 ft) and 209.9 m (689 ft)
- Tip: 230 m and 209.9 m
- Top floor: 230 m (750 ft) and 209.9 m (689 ft)

Technical details
- Floor count: 61 and 57

Design and construction
- Architect: SCDA
- Developer: PT Griyaceria Nusamekar
- Structural engineer: KK Lim & Associates Pte Ltd
- Main contractor: Hyundai Engineering & Construction

Casa Domaine is a residential complex of two towers, located at Tanah Abang in Jakarta, Indonesia. Casa Domaine Tower 1 is 230 meters tall, has 61 floor above the ground and 3 floor below the ground. Casa Domaine Tower 2 is 210 meters tall, has 57 floor above and 3 floor below the ground. Both the towers topped off in March, 2017. Casa Domaine Tower 1 is currently the 2nd tallest residential building in Jakarta

Land area of the complex is about 1.2 hectares complex. Adjacent to Shangri-La Hotel and Shangri-La Residences, Casa Domaine has a retail podium and facilities such as health club, Sky Terrace, swimming pool, yoga pavilion, and jogging path.

== See also ==
- List of tallest buildings in Indonesia
- List of tallest buildings in Jakarta
