= International Financial Center Jakarta =

Financial Center

International Financial Center
- IFC complex

General information
- Type: Commercial/office
- Location: Jakarta, Indonesia, Jalan Jenderal Sudirman, Kav 22-23
- Construction started: 2012
- Completed: 2016
- Owner: Keppel Land International Ltd

Height
- Architectural: 213.2 m (699 ft)
- Tip: 213.2 m
- Top floor: 213.2 m (699 ft)

Technical details
- Floor count: 49
- Floor area: 64,000 m^{2}
- Lifts/elevators: 12

Design and construction
- Architect: Pandega Desain Weharima (PDW)
- Developer: Keppel Land International Ltd
- Structural engineer: TY Lin international
- Main contractor: Samsung C&T Corporation

Website
- www.keppelland.com/CO-ID-International-Financial-Centre-Jakarta.asp

International Financial Center Jakarta is a complex of office buildings at Karet, Setiabudi in South Jakarta.

International Financial Tower 2 is the tallest among the buildings in the complex. The tower is 213.2 meter tall, has 49 floor above & 6 floor below the ground. The tower is certified the highest as Green Mark Platinum by Green Mark Gold Building and Construction Authority of Singapore (BCA) from Singapore.It is redeveloped at the place of previously 10 storied tower 1, which has now total floor area of approximately 61,300. The 18-storey Tower 1 will be redeveloped into a 49-storey office tower with a GFA of about 86,300 sm and is scheduled for completion by 2020.

== See also ==
- List of tallest buildings in Indonesia
- List of tallest buildings in Jakarta
