= Sahid Sudirman Center =

Coordinates: 6.210851°S 106.818567°E

- Interactive map of the Sahid Sudirman Center area

General information
- Type: Office
- Location: Jakarta, Indonesia, Kav 86, Jalan Jenderal Sudirman
- Construction started: 2012
- Completed: 2015
- Owner: KSO Sahid Megatama Karya Gemilang

Height
- Architectural: 258 m
- Tip: 258 m

Technical details
- Floor count: 59
- Floor area: 201,604 m² / 2,170,047 ft²
- Lifts/elevators: 30

Design and construction
- Architects: Smallwood, Reynolds, Stewart, Stewart
- Developer: PT.Piko Land Development
- Structural engineer: PT.Haerte

Sahid Sudirman Center is a commercial skyscraper at Jalan Jenderal Sudirman in Central Jakarta, Indonesia. The skyscraper is one of the tallest office building in Jakarta, which is 258 meters high, has 59 floors above & 4 floors below the ground. The building was funded by a joint venture of Sahid Group, Pikko Group, and Tan Kian Konsorsium which is known as KSO Sahid Megatama Karya Gemilang.

The skyscraper is part of a 5.5 hectares mixed development project of 9 high rise buildings of office, hotel, hospital and apartment towers. Five buildings including this tower have completed. Others are in planning or under construction. A twin towers named Sahid Perdana Tower will be part of the complex. Shahid Sudirman Center has direct basement level connection with already existing Sahid Jaya Hotel & Sahid Sudirman Residences of the complex.

== See also ==
- List of tallest buildings in Indonesia
- List of tallest buildings in Jakarta
