= 57 Promenade =

Coordinates: 6.197278°S 106.819039°E

- Interactive map of the 57 Promenade area

General information
- Type: Mixed
- Architectural style: Modern
- Location: Kebon Melati, Central Jakarta, Indonesia
- Construction started: 2017
- Completed: 2019

Technical details
- Floor count: 50 floors x 1; 25 floors x 1

Design and construction
- Architect: Broadway Malyan
- Developer: PT Intiland Development Tbk
- Structural engineer: Davy Sukamta & Partners

57 Promenade is a mixed development project at Kebon Melati, near Hotel Indonesia Roundabout in Jakarta, Indonesia.

The project is being developed on an area of 3.2 hectares (ha) in two phases. The first phase of development covered an area of 1.3 hectares, on which will be built two condo towers, City57 with 24 floors and Sky57 with 49 floors with five-story basement and an enclaved retail podium. The second phase with an area of 1.9 hectares, will be built two office towers Tower 57 and Union 57, one service apartment tower Atelier 57 and retail promenade. The development will be connected Jakarta MRT, Jakarta LRT, TransJakarta bus stops, and Soekarno-Hatta Airport Rail Link.

== See also ==
- List of tallest buildings in Indonesia
- List of tallest buildings in Jakarta
