= Equity Tower =

General information
- Status: Completed
- Type: Office
- Location: Jakarta, Indonesia, Sudirman Central Business District
- Construction started: 2007
- Completed: 2010

Height
- Roof: 220 m (722 ft)
- Top floor: 220 m (720 ft)

Technical details
- Floor count: 44
- Lifts/elevators: 20

Design and construction
- Architect: DP Architects Pte Ltd
- Developer: PT DANAYASA ARTHATAMA TBK

Equity Tower is an office skyscraper at Sudirman Central Business District in South Jakarta, Indonesia. The building has 220 meters of height, 44 floor above and 4 floor below the ground. It was completed in 2010. The tower is designed on the glass facade and an interior that emphasizes on marble slabs. The tower has a multi-functional hall, podium with retail space, food court, ATM gallery, and mosque. It has 954 parking slot for vehicles.

== See also ==
- Skyscraper design and construction
- List of tallest buildings in Jakarta
- List of tallest buildings in Indonesia
