= List of tallest buildings in Medan =

Medan is the capital of North Sumatra province and one of the largest cities in Indonesia. It is the largest city in the island of Sumatra, also the largest city in Indonesian archipelago outside the island of Java. Medan was transformed rapidly from a small kampong of few hundred people in 1869 into the largest city in Sumatra and when the Sultan of Deli moved their residence in 1891, Medan became the capital of North Sumatra. Rapid development ushered a western-centric development in Medan. Medan has many colonial architectural sites, while accompanying its growth as a metropolitan city. Construction of high-rise buildings in the city was restricted to 12 floors according to the Regulation of Flight Safety Operations because of the presence of Soewondo Airbase in the center of Medan. However, since commencing operation of Kuala Namu International Airport in 2013, construction of high-rise buildings in the city is booming. There are currently nine 150m+ buildings and another five are under construction.

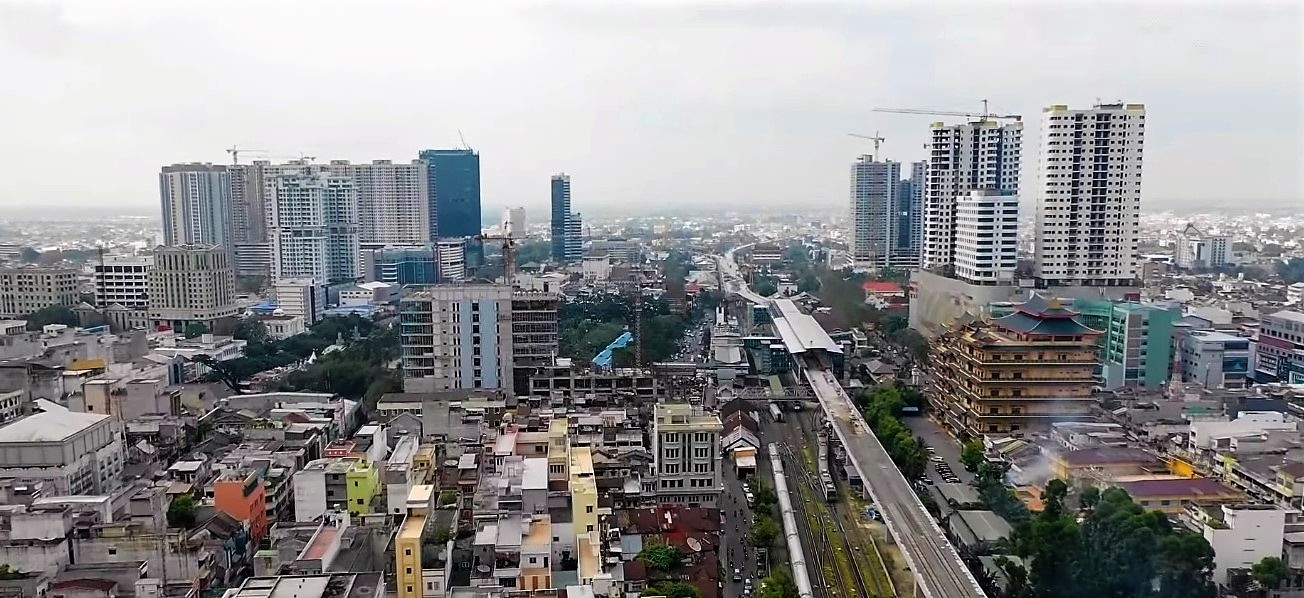
Medan city centre in 2019

== List of tallest buildings ==
This list includes completed and topped off buildings that have 29 floors or more.

| Rank | Name | Floors | Height m | Year | Image | Note |
|---|---|---|---|---|---|---|
| 1 | The Manhattan Tower 1 | 38 | 150.7 | 2019 | | Currently the tallest building in Medan |
| 1 | The Manhattan Tower 2 | 38 | 150.7 | 2019 | | Currently the tallest building in Medan |
| 3 | Grand Jati Junction Office Tower | 40 | 144 | 2019 | | |
| 4 | Podomoro City Deli Office Tower | 50 | | 2017 | | |
| 4 | Podomoro City Deli Premium Apartment I | 40 | | 2017 | | |
| 4 | Podomoro City Deli Premium Apartment II | 40 | | 2017 | | Currently the tallest building in Medan |
| 4 | Manhattan Cambridge Condominium I | 40 | | 2017 | | |
| 4 | Manhattan Cambridge Condominium II | 40 | | 2017 | | |
| 4 | Podomoro City Deli Condominium I | 30 | | 2017 | | Currently the tallest building in Medan |
| 4 | Podomoro City Deli Condominium II | 30 | | 2017 | | Currently the tallest building in Medan |
| 4 | Podomoro City Deli Apartment Liberty | 30 | | 2017 | | Currently the tallest building in Medan |
| 4 | Podomoro City Deli Apartment Lincoln | 30 | | 2017 | | Currently the tallest building in Medan |
| 4 | Podomoro City Deli Apartment Lexington | 30 | | 2017 | | Currently the tallest building in Medan |
| 4 | Centre Point - Centria | 30 | 128 | 2013 | | |
| 4 | Centre Point - Centrum | 30 | 123.8 | 2013 | | |
| 4 | Reiz Condominium | 30 | | 2019 | | |
| 5 | Hotel JW Marriott and B&G Tower | 28 | 108 | 2008 | | |
| 6 | RSU Mitra Medika Premiere | 27 | | 2021 | | |
| 6 | Grand Swiss Belhotel | 27 | | 2007 | | |
| 7 | Cambridge Hotel Medan | 27 | | 2009 | | |
| 7 | Cambridge City Square Condominium I | 26 | | 2009 | | |
| 7 | Cambridge City Square Condominium II | 26 | | 2009 | | |
| 7 | Cambridge City Square Condominium III | 26 | | 2009 | | |
| 8 | Hilton Garden Inn Medan | 20 | 94.4 | 2013 | | |
| 9 | Regale International Hotel & Convention | 18 | | | | |
| 10 | Adi Mulya Hotel | 17 | | | | |
| 11 | Hotel Grand Aston Medan | 16 | | | | |
| 11 | Hotel Citi International Sun Yat Sen | 16 | | | | |
| 12 | Royal Residence Apartment I | 15 | | | | |
| 12 | Royal Residence Apartment II | 15 | | | | |
| 12 | Lippo Plaza Hotel & Siloam Hospital I | 15 | | | | |

== List of tallest buildings under construction and proposed ==
=== Under construction ===
This is a list of high-rise buildings that are under construction in Medan and have at least 20 floors.

| Rank | Name | Floors | Height m | Year |
|---|---|---|---|---|
| 1 | Deli Tobacco Residences | 40 | | |
| 2 | J Queen Private Residences | 29 | | |
| 3 | De'Prima Apartement | 25 | | |
| 4 | Mansyur Residence Condotel Horison I | 24 | | |
| 5 | Mansyur Residence Condotel Horison II | 24 | | |
| 6 | Mansyur Residence Condotel Horison III | 24 | | |
| 7 | Mansyur Residence Condotel Horison IV | 24 | | |
| 8 | Sky View Setiabudi Apartment | 24 | | |
| 9 | Grand Residences | 24 | | |
| 10 | Princeton Building | 24 | | |
| 11 | Empire Suites-Ring Road | 24 | | |

=== Proposed ===
This is the list of high-rise buildings that are proposed to be built in Medan and are planned to have at least 20 floors.

| Rank | Name | Floors | Height m | Year |
|---|---|---|---|---|
| 1 | Cemara Asri Condominium I | 36 | | |
| 2 | Cemara Asri Condominium II | 36 | | |
| 3 | Kirana Tower Apartment I | 30 | | |
| 4 | Kirana Tower Apartment II | 30 | | |
| 5 | Kirana Tower Apartment III | 30 | | |
| 6 | The Tiara Hotel | 30 | | |
| 7 | Peninsula Apartment-Hotel I | 30 | | |
| 8 | Peninsula Apartment-Hotel II | 30 | | |
| 9 | Peninsula Apartment-Hotel III | 30 | | |
| 10 | Peninsula Apartment-Hotel IV | 14 | | |
| 11 | Sky Avenue Apartment Office I | 29 | | |
| 12 | Sky Avenue Apartment Office II | 29 | | |
| 13 | Sky Avenue Apartment Office III | 29 | | |
| 14 | Sky City Apartment | 20 | | |
| 15 | Setiabudi Residence I | 20 | | |
| 16 | Setiabudi Residence II | 20 | | |

== See also ==
- List of colonial buildings in Medan
- List of tallest buildings in Batam
- List of tallest buildings in Jakarta
- List of tallest buildings in Surabaya
- List of tallest buildings in Indonesia
