= Bakrie Tower =

Skyscraper in Jakarta, Indonesia

General information
- Status: Completed
- Type: Commercial
- Location: Jakarta, Indonesia
- Opening: 2009

Height
- Roof: 702 ft (214 m)

Technical details
- Floor count: 50

Design and construction
- Architect: HOK (firm)
- Main contractor: PT. Hutama Karya (Persero)

Bakrie Tower is a skyscraper located in Jakarta, Indonesia. This 50-story building was completed in 2009, following a construction start in 2006.

== See also ==
- Skyscraper design and construction
- List of tallest buildings in Indonesia
- List of tallest buildings in Jakarta
