= The Energy Tower =

The Energy
- Graha Energy Tower

General information
- Type: office
- Location: Jakarta, Indonesia, SCBD Lot 11A, Jalan Jenderal Sudirman KAV 52-53
- Completed: 2008

Height
- Architectural: 217 m (712 ft)
- Tip: 217 m
- Top floor: 217 m (712 ft)

Technical details
- Floor count: 43

Design and construction
- Architect: Kohn Pedersen Fox Associates
- Developer: PT Danayasa Arthatama
- Structural engineer: Wiratman & Associates

The Energy Tower, also known as The Energy Building, is an office building at Sudirman Central Business District in South Jakarta. The tower is 217 meters tall and has 43 floors. The building is part of Graha Niaga complex.

== See also ==
- List of tallest buildings in Indonesia
- List of tallest buildings in Jakarta
