= Icon Towers Jakarta =

Icon Towers
- Interactive map of the Icon Towers area

General information
- Status: Under construction. (Note: Resumes in December 2023)
- Type: Mixed
- Location: Jakarta, Indonesia, Jalan Setiabudi Raya
- Coordinates: 6°14′16.76″S 106°46′41.46″E
- Construction started: 2014
- Completed: 2029

Height
- Architectural: 384 m (1,260 ft) and 265 m (869 ft)

Technical details
- Floor count: 77 and 55
- Floor area: 320,112 m^{2} (3,445,660 sq ft)

Design and construction
- Developer: PT. Duta Anggada Realty, Tbk

Icon Towers is a multi functional complex of two under construction skyscraper, named as Icon Tower 1 and 2 at Setiabudi, South Jakarta, Indonesia. This is a mixed complex for hotel, residence and office. Tower 1 has 77 floors and 350 meters height, where as Tower 2 has 55 floors and 200+ meter height. The complex has a podium of 15 floors to connect two tower. The complex was expected to be completed by 2019.

== See also ==
- List of tallest buildings in Indonesia
- List of tallest buildings in Jakarta
