= Indonesia-1 Tower =

Coordinates: 6.192011°S 106.822436°E

Indonesia 1 Tower
- Indonesia Satu Tower
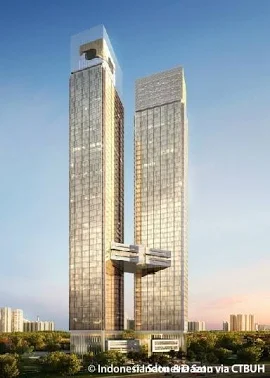
- Concept picture of the tower.
- Interactive map of the Indonesia 1 Tower area

General information
- Status: Topped-out
- Type: Mixed
- Location: Jakarta, Indonesia, Jalan M.H. Thamrin No.13, Central Jakarta
- Construction started: 2015
- Completed: 2027
- Cost: Rp 8 trillion
- Owner: PT China Sonangol Media Investment (2015–2022); PT Surya Indonesia 1 Properti (2022–)

Height
- Architectural: 303 m (994 ft) & 306 m (1,004 ft)

Technical details
- Floor count: 65 & 60
- Floor area: 204,000 square meters
- Lifts/elevators: KONE

Design and construction
- Architects: Mercurio Design Lab; PT Anggara Architeam
- Developer: China State Construction Overseas Development Shanghai
- Structural engineer: Davy Sukamta & Partners Structural Engineers
- Main contractor: China Construction Eight Engineering Division – ACSET Indonusa

Indonesia 1 Tower (Indonesian: Indonesia Satu Tower) is a twin-tower skyscraper currently under construction at Jalan M.H. Thamrin in Central Jakarta, Indonesia. It is designed by Mercurio Design Lab.

The towers will have offices, stores, condominiums and service apartments. The North Tower will be 303 metres tall and will be a multi-functional building that includes offices, retail space, and service apartments. Pan Pacific Serviced Suites will occupy levels 47 to 58. The South Tower will be 306 meters tall and will be an office building.

The building will be connected by tunnel to the Bundaran Hotel Indonesia station of Jakarta MRT.

Indonesia 1 was officially launched at a press conference on 29 August 2019 at Bromo Ballroom, Grand Hyatt Jakarta.

Indonesia-1 Tower under construction.

Construction was initially expected to be finished by 2021, but was halted in 19 April 2020 due to the COVID-19 pandemic. At the end of the first quarter in 2022, the Indonesian Media Group conglomerate acquired the two towers from China-Sonangol International.Ltd. after the cancellation of a joint venture between the two. As of December 2025, work has resumed to finish the towers; columns for the building and new cranes have been added.

== See also ==
- List of tallest buildings in Indonesia
- List of tallest buildings in Jakarta
