= Mangkuluhur City =

Coordinates: 6.2208410°S 106.8148042°E

- Interactive map of the Mangkuluhur City area

General information
- Status: On-hold
- Type: Hotel; Commercial offices Residential
- Architectural style: Modern
- Location: Jakarta, Indonesia, Jalan Jenderal Gatot Subroto Kav 1-3
- Construction started: 2014
- Completed: 2018-2020
- Owner: PT Kencana Graha Optima; PT Wisma Purnayudha

Height
- Top floor: 386 m x 1; 224 m x 1; 211 m x 1; 142 m x 1; 134 m x 1

Technical details
- Floor count: 87 floors x 1; 52 floors x 1; 35 floors x 1; 34 floors x 1

Design and construction
- Architect: DP Architects
- Developer: KG Global
- Structural engineer: PTI Architects

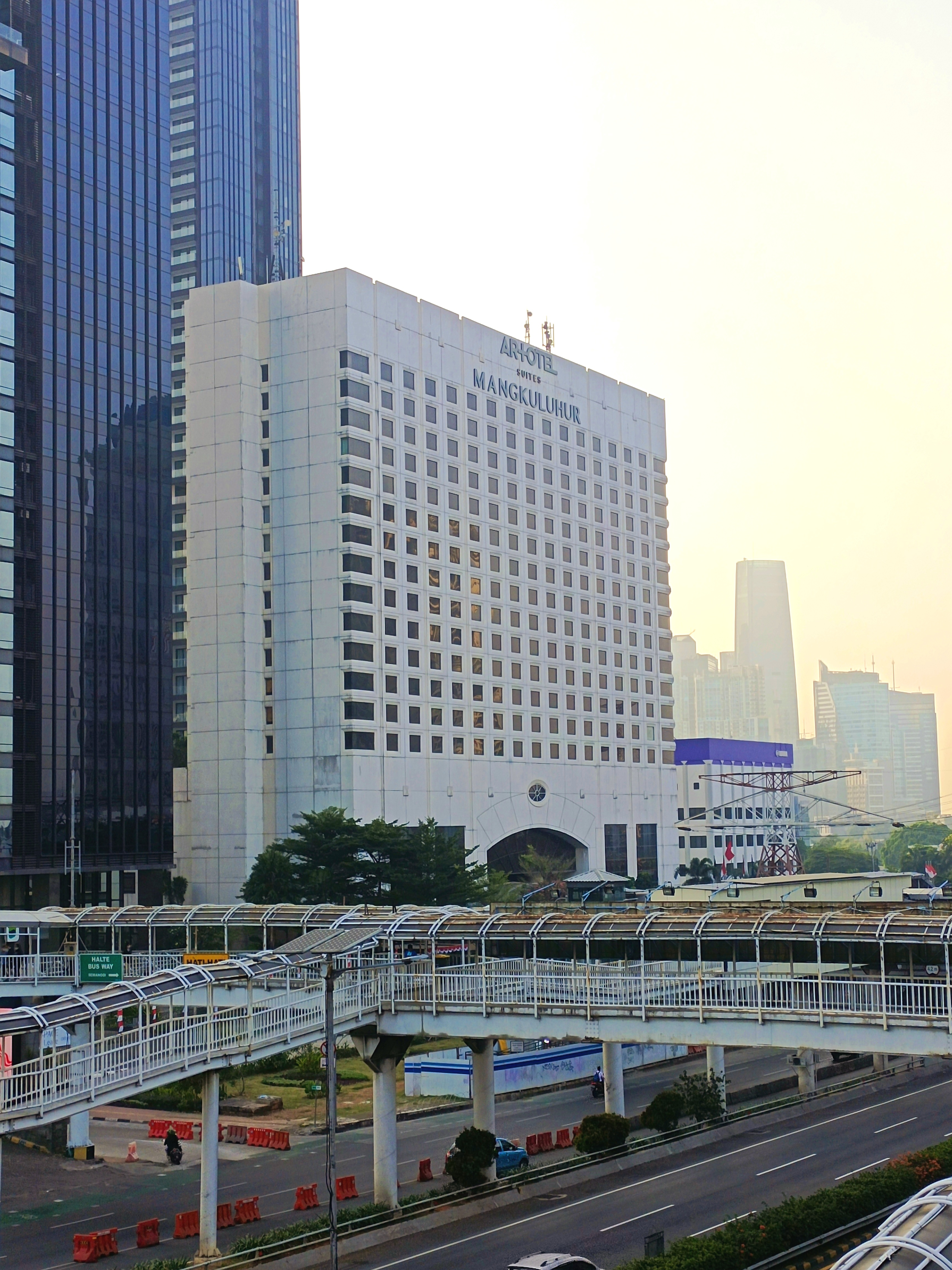
Hotel Building in Mangkuluhur

Mangkuluhur City is a mixed development of four skyscrapers and one high-rise building on Jalan Jenderal Gatot Subroto in Jakarta, Indonesia.

Mangkuluhur City is named after Darma Mangkuluhur, the son of the development's co-owner, Tommy Suharto. The project is a collaboration between PT Wisma Purnayudha Putra and KG Global Development. PT Wisma Purnayudha Putra is owned by Tommy, while KG Global Development is owned by Harry Gunawan and Edy Hartono. Total land area of the development is about 4 hectares.

The tallest of the towers, The Pinnacle, will have 80 floors above the ground. The development comprises Office Tower 1, Office Tower 2, Apartment Tower A and Apartment Tower B. Office Tower 1 is 33 floors, while Office Tower 2 is 80 floors. Apartment Tower A is 53 floors and Apartment Tower B is 30 floors. Apartment Tower A will house the Regent Hotel and Regent Residences, while Apartment Tower B is being managed by Frasers Hospitality. Office Tower 1 and Apartment Tower B topped off in March 2017. Office Tower 1 houses KEB Hana Bank as its main tenant, which has a 20 year lease.

There were existing Crowne Plaza hotel, which will operate in Mangkuluhur City. A Regent Hotel is also being developed at the site and was scheduled to have opened at the end of 2020.

== See also ==
- List of tallest buildings in Indonesia
- List of tallest buildings in Jakarta
