= TCC Batavia Towers =

Coordinates: 6.210889°S 106.815747°E

The City Center @ Batavia
- Interactive map of the The City Center @ Batavia area

General information
- Type: office
- Location: Jakarta, Indonesia, Jalan K.H. Mas Mansyur No.126, RW.5,
- Construction started: 2009
- Completed: 2012
- Owner: PT Greenwood Sejahtera

Height
- Architectural: 208 m (682 ft)
- Tip: 208 m

Technical details
- Floor count: 47

Design and construction
- Architects: Airmas Asri; DP Architects
- Structural engineer: Davy Sukamta & Partners Structural Engineers

The City Center Batavia or TCC Batavia Towers is a complex of three office towers located at Tanah Abang in Jakarta, Indonesia.

The City Center Tower 1 (City Center Annex Building) is the tallest among the towers, which 208 meters tall skyscraper. There are parking spaces, ATM's, restaurant, retail outlets and bank as facilities in the office complex.

== See also ==
- List of tallest buildings in Jakarta
- List of tallest buildings in Indonesia
