= Trinity Tower =

Skyscraper in Jakarta, Indonesia

- Daswin Building
- Interactive map of the Trinity Tower area

General information
- Type: Office
- Location: Jakarta, Indonesia, South Jakarta
- Coordinates: 6.2247°S 106.8335°E
- Construction started: 2018
- Completed: 2020
- Cost: US$260 million
- Owner: PT Windas Development

Height
- Architectural: 246 m (807 ft)

Technical details
- Floor count: 50 (office tower); 14 (parking tower)
- Floor area: 140,000 m^{2} (1,500,000 sq ft)

Design and construction
- Architect: Mitsubishi Jisho Sekkei
- Structural engineer: PT. Gistama Inti Semesta
- Main contractor: Shimizu and Total Bangun Persada

Trinity Tower is a skyscraper situated at the intersection of H.R. Rasuna Said Road and Jl. Prof. Dr. Satrio Road in Jakarta, Indonesia. The building was known as the Daswin building during its construction period. It was developed by PT Windas Development, which consists of Japan-based real estate giant Mitsubishi Estate, Indonesian manufacturing company and property developer Gesit Group and diversified conglomerate Santini Group. The project was the first opportunity for Mitsubishi Estate to develop an office building in Indonesia.

Built with earthquake resistant technology and a green building concept, the tower is constructed on a land area of 1.6 hectares. The tower has three floors of retail, thirteen floors of parking and a basement floor, with total floor area of over 140,000 m^{2} (1,500,000 sq ft).

On July 2, 2025, PT Mitsubishi Electric Indonesia officially moved to Trinity Tower.

== See also ==
- List of tallest buildings in Indonesia
- List of tallest buildings in Jakarta
