= Wisma 46 =

Skyscraper in Jakarta, Indonesia

- Interactive map of the Wisma 46 area

Record height
- Tallest in Indonesia from 1996 to 2016^{[I]}
- Preceded by: Graha Mandiri
- Surpassed by: Gama Tower

General information
- Status: Completed
- Type: Office, Retail
- Architectural style: Postmodern
- Location: Jakarta, Indonesia, Jalan Jenderal Sudirman, Kav-1
- Coordinates: 06°12′13″S 106°49′12″E
- Named for: Bank Negara Indonesia 1946
- Construction started: 1992
- Completed: 1996

Height
- Tip: 271.9 m (892 ft)
- Roof: 261.9 m (859 ft)

Technical details
- Floor count: 46
- Lifts/elevators: 24

Design and construction
- Architects: Zeidler Roberts Partnership (Zeidler Partnership Architects) and DP Architects Private Ltd.

Website
- wisma46.com

Wisma 46 is a 261.9-meter tall (architectural height) skyscraper located in the BNI City complex at Jalan Jenderal Sudirman in Jakarta, Indonesia. The 46-floor office tower features a 10 m (33 ft) antenna spire, and was completed in 1996 under the design by Zeidler Roberts Partnership (Zeidler Partnership Architects) and DP Architects Private Ltd.

The tower is located on a 15 hectares lot in the city centre. It has a floor area of 140,028 m^{2} (1,507,250 sq ft). The tower has 46 floors above ground which consist of offices only. There are 2 underground floors used for car parking. The tower contains 24 elevators, 6 of which can reach speeds of 360 mpm (meter per minute) in the super high speed models.

Wisma 46 was the tallest building in Indonesia from 1996 until 2016, when it was surpassed by the 285.5 m (937 ft) tall Gama Tower. When measured up to the roof, the tower is 261.9 m (859 ft) tall and when measured up to the lower roof, it is only 200 m (660 ft) tall.

== Design ==
This building has a modern design and also a unique appearance, which is curved shaped like a pen and fully covered by square patterned glass facade. On either side of the tower, the glass facade is covered by a hollow concrete wall that is also square shaped. Because of its uniqueness, this skyscraper is one of the icons of Jakarta after Monas.

== In popular culture ==
This building appears in the 2004 video game Need For Speed: Underground 2, located in Bayview City Centre.

This building also appears on the front cover of the book Indonesia Etc: Exploring the Improbable Nation by Elizabeth Pisani.

== Gallery ==
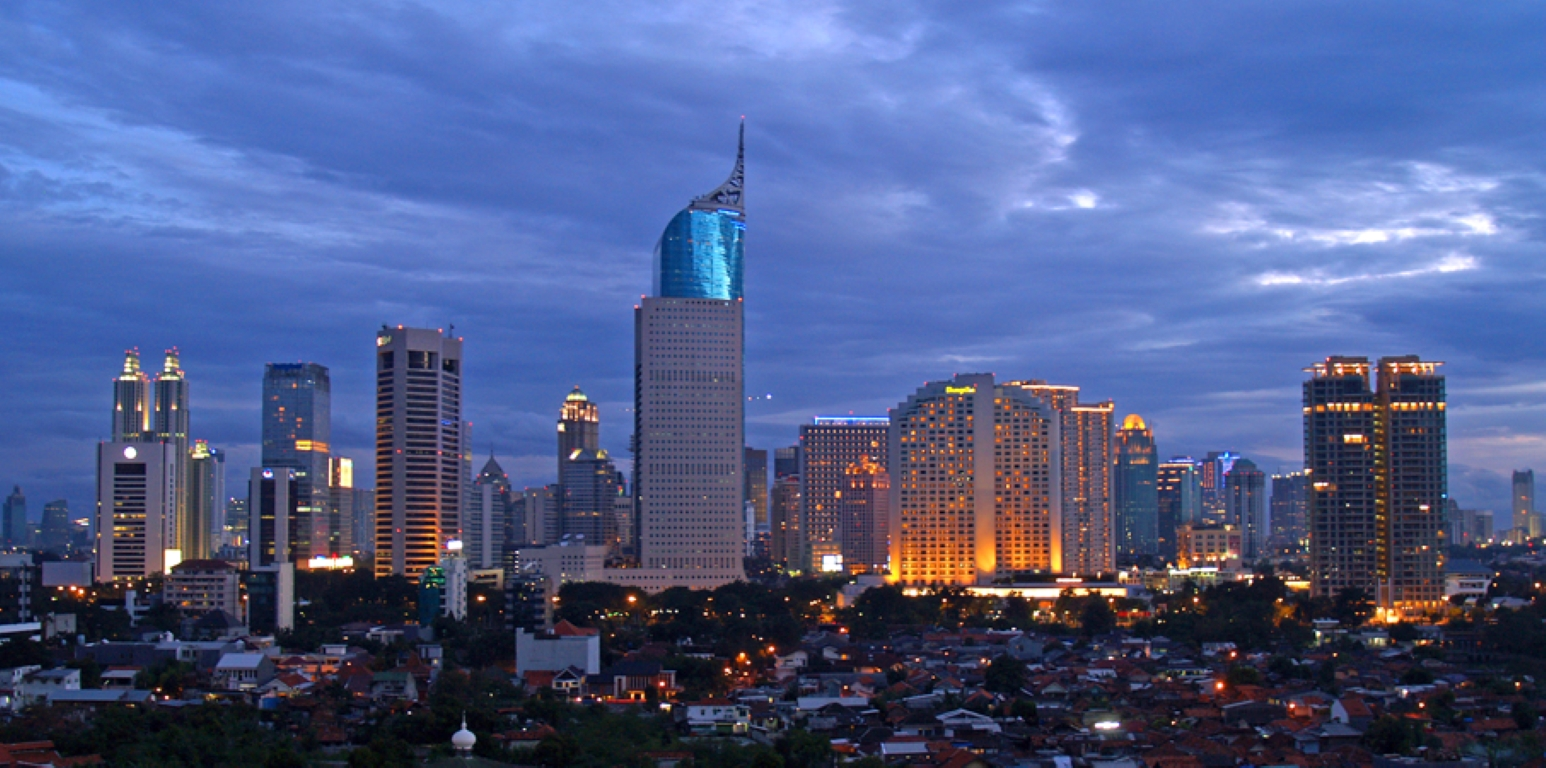
The Wisma 46 and surrounding buildings in 2008

Wisma 46 (right) next to the BNI headquarters building (left)

== See also ==
- List of skyscrapers
- Bank Negara Indonesia
- List of tallest buildings in Jakarta
