= Green Bay Pluit =

- Green Bay Pluit in Jakarta

General information
- Type: Shopping mall Residential
- Architectural style: Modern
- Location: Jl. Pluit Karang Ayu, Pluit, Jakarta, Indonesia
- Coordinates: 6.11173°S 106.78134°E
- Construction started: 2011
- Completed: 2015

Height
- Antenna spire: 682 ft (208 m)
- Roof: 682 ft (208 m)
- Top floor: 682 ft (208 m)

Technical details
- Floor count: 48 floors x 4; 34 floors x 4; 33 floors x 4; 26 floors x 4

Design and construction
- Architect: Airmas asri
- Developer: Agung Podomoro Land

Website
- https://baywalkmall.com/

Green Bay Pluit is a mixed development complex with an area of about 12.5 hectares (31 acres), located at Pluit in North Jakarta, Indonesia. This super-block is built on the seafront, which has a Mall, 12 towers of apartment and condominium. It has a botanical garden of 3 hectares (7.4 acres) area & water sports recreation facilities. Green Bay Pluit is developed by Agung Podomoro Land.

Sea View Condominium has four towers, named as J, K, L and M. Bay View Apartment has 4 towers of E, F, G and H. Coast View Apartment has 4 towers known as A, B, C and D.

== Bay Walk Mall ==
Bay Walk Mall is part of this complex, which is spread over lower 6 floors with 55,000 square meters floor space & has about 250 stores. From the water front walkway area in the Bay Walk Mall, Apartemen Pantai Mutiara, Marina Condominium, and Regatta complex is visible.

The shopping mall comprises six floors and a basement, which contains a parking lot. The basement houses Bay Walk Tunnel, which contains additional tenants and a water feature. There are two gardens accessible through the tunnel which also has parking space. There is also indoor parking connected to the main mall. Behind the main building is a waterfront where the nearby beach, Pantai Mutiara, can be seen.

The Water Front also has a pier for speed boats to take tourists to the Kepulauan Seribu islands, located just in the Jakarta Bay region.

The mall is located between the Muara Angke fishermen port at its west side and the National Electricity Company (PLN) power plant on its east side.

== See also ==
- List of tallest buildings in Jakarta
- List of shopping malls in Jakarta
