= Millennium Office Tower =

Coordinates: 6.224676°S 106.803843°E

Millennium Centennial Center
- Interactive map of the Millennium Centennial Center area

General information
- Status: Completed
- Type: Office
- Location: Jakarta, Indonesia, Jalan Jenderal Sudirman, Kav-25
- Construction started: 2016
- Completed: 2019
- Owner: PT Permata Birama Sakti

Height
- Architectural: 250.5 m (821.9 ft)
- Tip: 250.5 m (821.9 ft)
- Top floor: 229.3 m (752.3 ft)

Technical details
- Material: Concrete
- Floor count: 53
- Floor area: 141,500 m^{2} (1,523,000 ft^{2})
- Lifts/elevators: 32

Design and construction
- Architects: Smallwood, Reynolds, Stewart, Stewart & Assc. Inc.
- Developer: PT Permata Birama Sakti
- Structural engineer: PT Haerte Widya Consultant
- Main contractor: PT Acset Indonusa Tbk

Other information
- Parking: 1000

Millennium Centennial Center is an office building located at Jalan Jenderal Sudirman, in Jakarta, Indonesia. It is owned by PT Permata Birama Sakti, and was designed by Smallwood, Reynolds, Stewart, Steward & Assc. Inc. Construction began in 2016 and was completed in 2019. It is 250.5 metres (821.9 feet) tall. The building comprises 53 floors above-ground and 6 below-ground, with 1000 available parking spaces.

== See also ==
- List of tallest buildings in Indonesia
- List of tallest buildings in Jakarta
