= The Peak Twin Towers =

Indonesian apartment complex

The Peak at Sudirman
- Interactive map of the The Peak at Sudirman area

General information
- Location: Jalan Setiabudi Raya no. 9, South Jakarta, Indonesia
- Construction started: 2003
- Completed: 2007
- Opening: 2006

Height
- Antenna spire: 265 m

Technical details
- Floor count: 55 and 35

Design and construction
- Architects: DP Architects Private Limited, PT. Airmas Asri
- Developer: PT Sunter Agung
- Structural engineer: Davy Sukamta & Partners - Structural Engineers, Jakarta, Indonesia

The Peak is a twin tower luxury apartment complex located at Setiabudi, within the Golden Triangle CBD in Jakarta. It was designed by DP Architects and comprises four towers. Towers 1 and 2 have 55 storeys and a height of 218.5 m,. while Towers 3 and 4 have 35 storeys. In 2006, the year The Peak was opened, it was featured by Images Publishing Australia in its book 50 of the World's Best Apartments. Davy Sukamta & Partners - Structural Engineers, Indonesia, were the structural design engineers for the project.

== See also ==
- List of tallest residential buildings in the world
- List of tallest buildings in Jakarta
