= 7Point8 =

Coordinates: 6.208379°S 106.821336°E

- Sudirman 7.8
- Interactive map of the 7Point8 area

General information
- Status: On hold
- Type: office
- Location: Jakarta, Indonesia, Jalan Jenderal Sudirman, Kav.7-8
- Construction started: 2015
- Completed: TBA

Height
- Architectural: 298 m (978 ft)
- Tip: 298 m
- Top floor: 298 m (978 ft)

Technical details
- Floor count: 60 above the ground, 5 underground
- Lifts/elevators: 15

Design and construction
- Architect: Broadway Malyan
- Developer: Karya Cipta Group

7Point8 is a skyscraper on-hold at Sudirman Avenue, Jakarta, Indonesia. The building is 298 meters tall and will have 60 floors above the ground and 5 floors below the ground. It is part of a complex of two towers, which will be linked by a multistory podium that will provide two tall exterior "walls" for the central plaza. In addition to two linked towers, the complex replicates an alun-alun, a traditional Javanese town center characterized by a walled, open-air courtyard.

Construction of the building started in 2015 and completion is expected by 2019. In addition to office, retail, commercial, residential, and public space, the complex will have direct connections to Jakarta MRT's new Setiabudi Astra station.

== See also ==
- List of tallest buildings in Indonesia
- List of tallest buildings in Jakarta
