= Capital Place Jakarta =

Capital Place Office Tower
- St. Regis Hotel & Office Tower
- Interactive map of the Capital Place Office Tower area

General information
- Type: office and hotel
- Location: Jakarta, Indonesia, Jalan Jenderal Gatot Subroto, Kav 18
- Coordinates: 6.2322961°S 106.8202290°E
- Construction started: 2012
- Completed: 2016
- Owner: Rajawali Property Group

Height
- Architectural: 215.1 m (706 ft)
- Tip: 215.1 m
- Top floor: 215.1 m (706 ft)

Technical details
- Floor count: 48
- Floor area: 90,819 sq m

Design and construction
- Architect: Pelli Clarke Pelli Architects
- Structural engineer: Beca Group;PT Gistama Intisemesta

Capital Place Jakarta is a mixed development complex at Jalan Jenderal Gatot Subroto in South Jakarta, Indonesia. Capital Place Office Tower is part of the complex, which also occupies by Four Seasons Hotel. The office tower is a 215.1 meter tall, has 48 floors above & 6 floors below the ground.

The tower tapers as it gets higher, with lower floors offering floor plates of 2,500 sqm. The middle floors are 2,100 sqm and the premium space at the top has a floor-plate of 1,800 sqm. The tower is built environmentally friendly with features include daylight and motion sensors for the interior lighting, such as in the bathrooms and stairwells. The tower is connected with the hotel building by a multilevel retail podium. There are also 1,350 car-park spaces in the complex.

== See also ==
- List of tallest buildings in Indonesia
- List of tallest buildings in Jakarta
