= Pertamina Energy Tower =

Cancelled skyscraper in Jakarta, Indonesia

- Interactive map of the Pertamina Energy Tower area

General information
- Status: Never Build
- Type: Office, observation, energy
- Location: Kav. Rasuna Off Park (ROP) Unit XO-02, JL. HR. Rasuna Said -, South Jakarta, Indonesia
- Coordinates: 6°12′56″S 106°49′47″E
- Groundbreaking: 2012
- Construction started: 2014
- Completed: 2030

Height
- Architectural: 523 metres (1,716 ft)
- Tip: 523 metres (1,716 ft)
- Top floor: 510 metres (1,670 ft)

Technical details
- Floor count: 99
- Floor area: 495,000 m^{2} (5,328,100 sq ft)

Design and construction
- Architect: Skidmore, Owings & Merrill LLP (SOM)
- Structural engineer: Skidmore, Owings & Merrill LLP (SOM)

Pertamina Energy Tower was a proposed 99-storey, 523-metre (1,716 ft) skyscraper in Jakarta, Indonesia. It was designed and planned by Skidmore, Owings & Merrill LLP (SOM), a private architecture and engineering company, and it was supposed to be the new HQ of the state-owned energy company Pertamina.

== Design ==
The tower was proposed to have a dual structural system composed of a central reinforced concrete core and a perimeter composite moment frame. The two systems are connected at regular intervals along the height using steel outrigger and belt trusses.

== Postponement of the construction ==
On 20 February 2015, Pertamina Finance Director Arief Budiman, confirmed that further construction of the Pertamina Energy Tower was suspended due to "depressed oil prices."

== Restart of a scaled-down tower ==
CNN reported in 19 April 2016 that a scaled-down 30-storey tower (instead of the original 99 storey) will be restarted by a local state-owned bank PT Bank Negara Indonesia Tbk (BNI).

== See also ==
- List of tallest buildings in Jakarta
- List of tallest buildings in Indonesia
