= BDNI Center =

Planned skyscraper

General information
- Status: Abandoned
- Location: Jalan Kh. MAS Mansyur, Jakarta, Indonesia
- Construction started: 1995
- Owner: PT Grand Paradise

Height
- Roof: 317 m (1,040 ft)

Technical details
- Floor count: 62

Design and construction
- Architects: PT Airmas Asri, Pei Partnership Architects

BDNI Center (additional name Sentra Bank Dagang Nasional Indonesia ) is an abandoned 317 m (1040 ft) skyscraper with 62 floors, located in the city of Jakarta, Indonesia.

PT Grand Paradise is the owner of the project. BDNI centre was designed by PT Airmas Asri, Pei Partnership Architects. It was designed to be the headquarters of BDNI. The design was similar to that of the Bank of China Tower in Hong Kong which was also designed by I. M. Pei.

This project was cancelled due to financial difficulties which followed the 1997 Asian financial crisis and caused the collapse of BDNI bank.
