= Jakarta Mori Tower =

Coordinates: 6.219711°S 106.810729°E

- Interactive map of the Jakarta Mori Tower area
- Former names: Jakarta Office Tower Project/Jakarta MPP

General information
- Status: Completed
- Type: Office
- Location: Jakarta, Indonesia, Central Jakarta
- Construction started: 2017
- Completed: 2022
- Cost: US$500 million
- Owner: Mori Building

Height
- Architectural: 265.6 m (871 ft)

Technical details
- Floor count: 57
- Floor area: 190,000 m^{2} (2,000,000 sq ft)

Design and construction
- Architecture firm: Kohn Pedersen Fox Pandega Desain Weharima (PDW)
- Main contractor: Shimizu Corporation and Bangun Tjipta Kontraktor

Jakarta Mori Tower (formerly tentatively known as the Jakarta Office Tower Project, or Jakarta MPP) is a skyscraper in Jakarta, Indonesia. It is located in the center of the Golden Triangle of Jakarta, next to Semanggi Interchange.

The project is Mori Building’s first undertaking in Southeast Asia and its first major overseas undertaking since the Shanghai World Financial Center that opened in 2008. The 57-story building with four basement floors will have a total floor area of 190,000 square metres (2,000,000 sq ft), with office space along with restaurants and cafes. The tower is 265.6 m (871 ft) tall and the estimated cost is $500 million. It was completed in 2022.

== See also ==
- List of tallest buildings in Indonesia
- List of tallest buildings in Jakarta
