= Sinarmas MSIG Tower =

Skycraper

General information
- Status: Completed
- Type: Commercial
- Location: Jakarta, Indonesia, Jalan Jenderal Sudirman, Kav-21
- Opening: 2015
- Owner: Sinarmas MSIG Life and PT Smart Tbk

Height
- Roof: 804 ft (245 m)

Technical details
- Floor count: 48
- Floor area: 81,598 m^{2} / 878,314 ft^{2}

Design and construction
- Architect: Marzio Kato Architecture
- Developer: Duta Anggata Group

Sinarmas MSIG Tower is a skyscraper at Sudirman Avenue, Jakarta, Indonesia. The 48 story building was completed in 2015, construction having begun in 2012. Architecturally the tower is 248 meters tall. The building serves as the headquarters of Indonesian insurance company Sinarmas MSIG. The tower was built using modern and environmentally friendly principles and materials such as Low E Glass, a double glass system that can reduce heat and sound leakage, as the embodiment of a building with energy efficiency. In addition it has Building Automation System (BAS) to control water, electricity, and air conditioning.

== See also ==
- Skyscraper design and construction
- List of tallest buildings in Indonesia
