= Signature Tower Jakarta =

Skyscraper in Indonesia

Signature Tower
- Interactive map of the Signature Tower area

General information
- Status: Never built
- Type: Office and hotel
- Location: Jl. Jendral Sudirman Kav 52–53, Sudirman Central Business District, Kebayoran baru, Jakarta, Indonesia
- Coordinates: 6.2262°S 106.8098°E

Height
- Architectural: 638 m (2,093 ft)
- Tip: 638 m (2,093 ft)
- Top floor: 515.8 m (1,692 ft)
- Observatory: 515.8 m (1,692 ft)

Technical details
- Floor count: 113 above ground and 6 below

Design and construction
- Architects: Smallwood, Reynolds, Stewart, Stewart
- Developer: PT Grahamas Adisentosa; PT Danayasa Arthatama

Signature Tower was a proposed skyscraper in Jakarta, Indonesia. The proposed height is 638 m (2,093 ft).

The tower was proposed in 2010, with developers hoping to begin construction in 2015. Planning permission for the tower was granted in late 2015. Construction was scheduled to begin in the third quarter of 2016, assuming a loan of approximately $1.5 billion could be secured. China State Construction Engineering has been appointed to construct the tower.

The planned skyscraper is a part of a 45-hectare (110-acre) redevelopment project of (Sudirman Central Business District) SCBD, near the Semanggi Interchange and located south of Gelora Bung Karno Stadium. It is within the Golden Triangle of Jakarta, where the majority of the city's major development areas are located. When completed, the structure will include six basement floors used for parking space, while the podium will feature retail, convention and entertainment venues, with the rest of the skyscraper used as office and residential space.

== Engineering and design ==
Due to the presence of unstable alluvial deposits within the Jakarta Basin and the seismic prone area from where the skyscraper will be built, the design must comply with seismic criteria using a probabilistic seismic hazard analysis (PSHA) defined by the Pacific Earthquake Engineering Research Center (PEER), Tall Buildings Provisions and the American Society of Civil Engineers (ASCE). In addition, wind tunnel tests must be conducted under city regulations due to the height of the building exceeding 50 stories and 200 m (656 ft). Aerodynamic testing was performed by applying a scaled wind velocity on a 1:500 scale model of the skyscraper equivalent to applying an average hourly wind velocity of 40 m/s (130 ft/s) on the actual design.

On 13 July 2017, acting governor of Jakarta Djarot Syaiful Hidayat attended a regional meeting with the developers, discussing about the UDGL (Urban Design Guide Line) and finally reached an agreement to integrate the tower with the ongoing developments of the Jakarta MRT. Djarot later sent a letter to Indonesian President Joko Widodo, requesting him to make the tower to become a national icon.

=== Foundation ===
To accommodate the basement floor levels, 23.5 m (77 ft) had to be excavated and dewatered prior to construction. Drilled shaft bore piles measuring 1.2 m (4 ft) in diameter and 90 m (295 ft) in length with a spacing of 3.6 m (12 ft) were suspended within a 6.5 m (21 ft) to 7.5 m (25 ft) thick mat foundation system designed to resist wind and seismic loads. This technique also redistributes axial loads on top of the harder and denser sediment underlying the alluvium. Surrounding the basement wall is a 1.1 m (4 ft) thick slurry wall designed to withstand and retain both groundwater and soil pressures.

=== Structure ===
To withstand lateral loads, a "core-outrigger-mega-frame" system consisting of two major components will be used. The primary system will feature a composite concrete core connected to eight surrounding super columns all suspended within a network of steel outrigger trusses that spans two stories. A mega frame consisting of a network of nine belt trusses interlocking the super columns together will make up the secondary system that surrounds the primary structure. The super columns will eventually thin and slope towards the apex to match the profile of the architectural tip. The 31 m (102 ft) square concrete core that houses the elevator shafts and stairwells will thin to .6 m (2 ft) near the top from a ground thickness of 1.1 m (4 ft) to accommodate additional space. The floors residing between the primary and secondary systems will feature a hybrid design consisting of concrete slabs on top of a metal deck to reduce construction time and reduce additional loads.

== Indefinite postponement ==
In June 2018, PT Danayasa Arthatama, the company that owns and develops SCBD, announced the development of Signature Tower Jakarta had been indefinitely postponed. Tony Soesanto, the director of project development company Grahamas Adisentosa, said the company decided to postpone construction because the market for office space was not promising. He also said there was a financing problem and the company had tried to conduct a road show to attract investors or loans.

== See also ==
- List of tallest buildings in Indonesia
- List of tallest buildings in Jakarta
- Proposed tall buildings and structures
- List of buildings with 100 floors or more
