= Gama Tower =

Skyscraper in Jakarta, Indonesia

- Menara Gama
- Interactive map of the Gama Tower area
- Former names: Cemindo Tower, Rasuna Tower

Record height
- Tallest in Indonesia from 2016 to 2022^{[I]}
- Preceded by: Wisma 46
- Surpassed by: Autograph Tower

General information
- Type: Office and hotel
- Location: South Jakarta, Jakarta, Indonesia, Kav-C22, Jalan H R Rasuna Said
- Coordinates: 6.224153°S 106.833731°E
- Current tenants: Embassy of India Westin Hotel
- Construction started: 2011
- Completed: 2016
- Owner: PT Gamaland

Height
- Architectural: 285.5 m (937 ft)
- Tip: 310 m (1,020 ft)
- Top floor: 285.4 m (936 ft)

Technical details
- Floor count: 64 (top floor designated as 69, due to number skippings)
- Floor area: 163,466 m^{2} (1,759,530 ft^{2})
- Lifts/elevators: 33, installed by Schindler Group

Design and construction
- Architect: PT Sekawan Design Inc. Architect
- Developer: Cushman & Wakefield
- Structural engineer: Taylor Thomson Whitting
- Main contractor: PT Tatamulia Nusantara Indah

Website
- www.gamakarta.com

Gama Tower (formerly known as Cemindo Tower) is a skyscraper located at Jalan H.R. Rasuna Said, South Jakarta, Indonesia. It was also known as Rasuna Tower and Cemindo Tower during construction period, but finally named as Gama Tower. As of 2022, it is the 3rd tallest building in Jakarta, as well as Indonesia.

The tower has an architectural height of 285.5 metres (937 feet), while its tip reached a height of 297 metres (974 feet). It has 64 floors above and 4 floors below the ground. The land area of the tower development is 1.6 hectares. It has a parking lot for over 1,100 vehicles. At present, the tower is the 3rd tallest building in Indonesia and 74th tallest building in the world. The tower is a mixed office and hotel building.

Construction of the tower was started in 2011. The tower was topped off in 2015 and opened in August 2016. At that time, the construction cost of the building was around Rp2 trillion (about US$150 million in 2016).

Gama Tower is a luxury office tower which applies green building concepts and development. Westin Hotel occupies the top 20 floors of the tower, between the 50th and 69th floors. 360 degree views of Jakarta can be observed from the restaurant at the 51st floor. Henshin operates a club and lounge at the 67th floor as well as restaurant at 68th and 69th floor, the topmost floor of the tower. A function hall is also located within the 69th floor. The rest of the floors are executive office spaces.

== Gallery ==
Tower in 2016, shortly after opening

Ground-level view of Gama Tower

Gama Tower at sunset

Gama Tower at night

Gama Tower in January 2021

== See also ==
- List of tallest buildings in Jakarta
- List of tallest buildings in Indonesia
- List of tallest buildings in Southeast Asia
