= Thamrin Nine =

Coordinates: 6.19914°S 106.82263°E

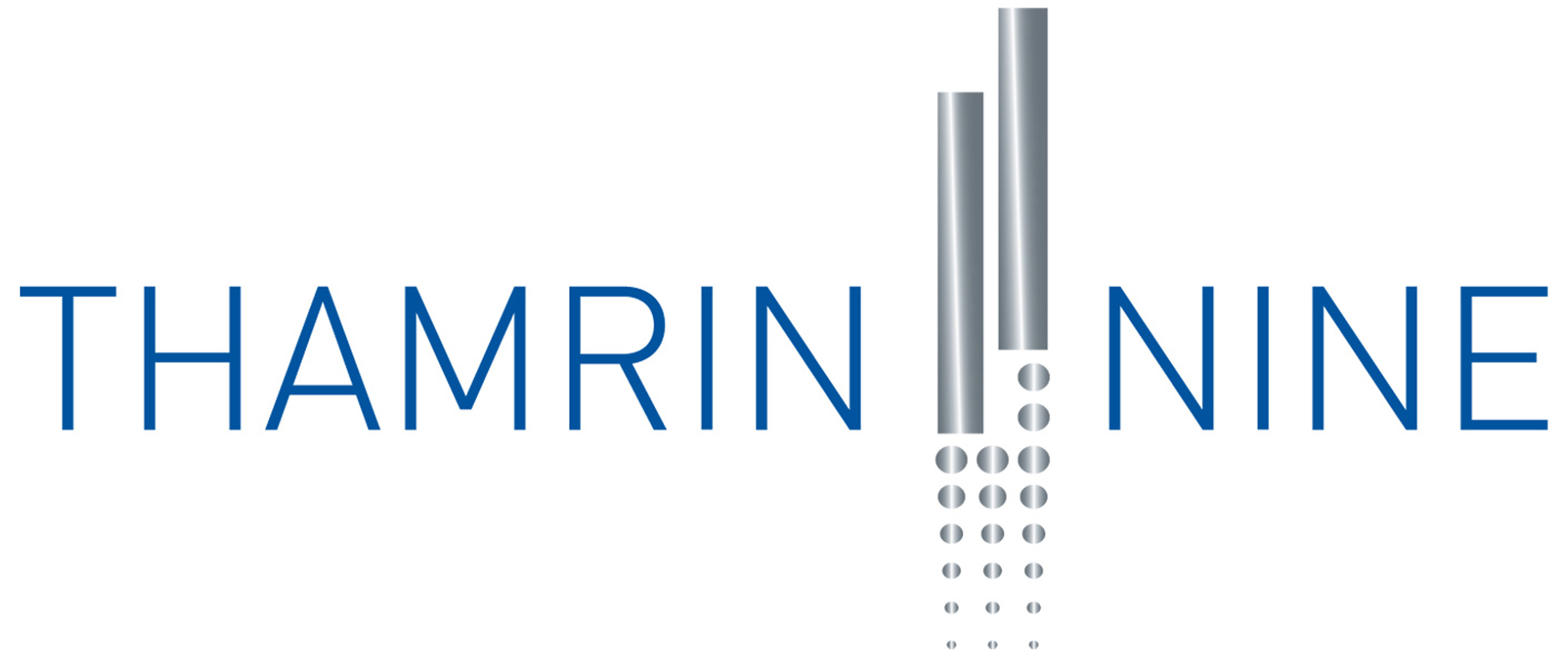

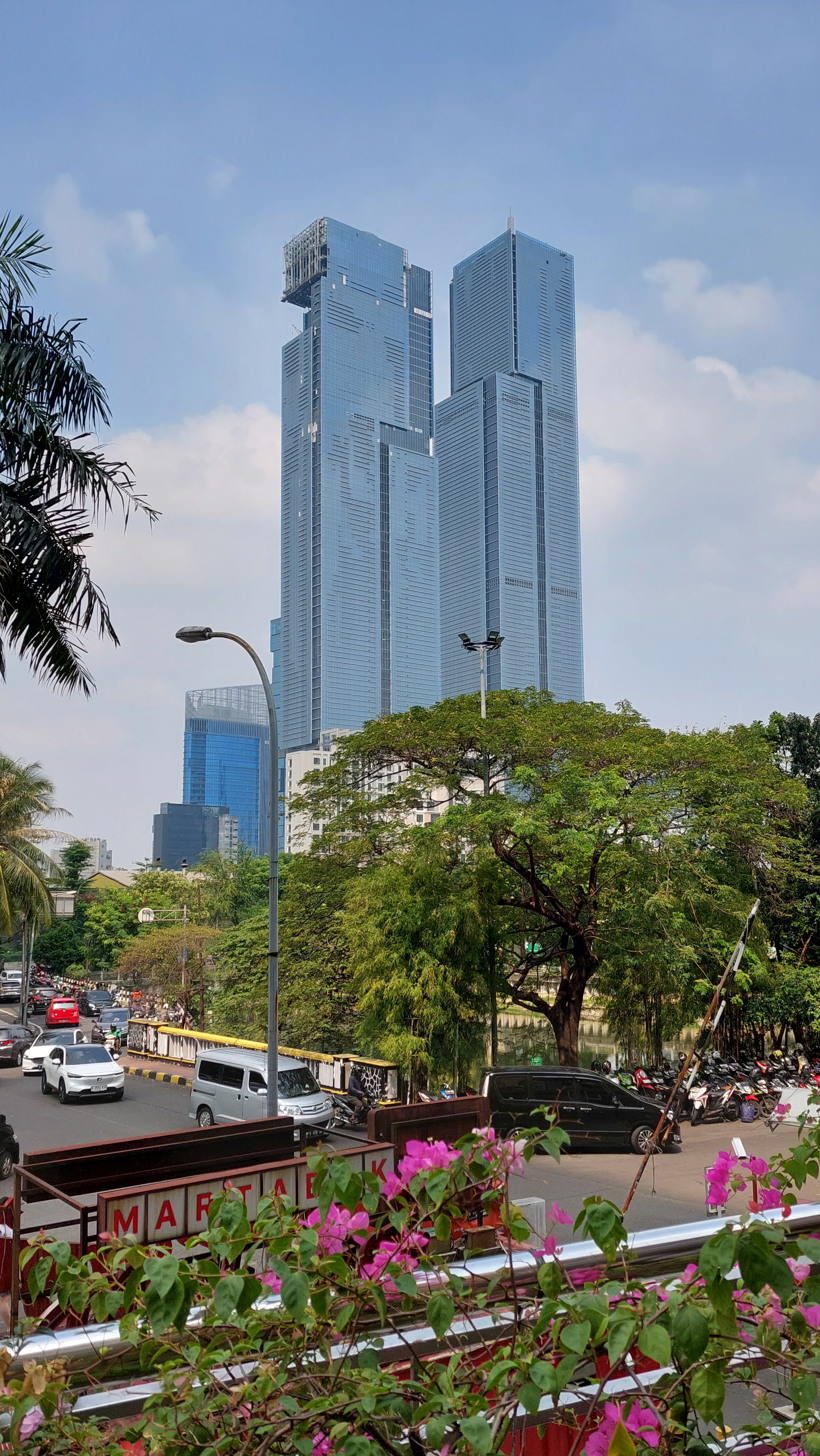
- Thamrin Nine projects in May 2023. From left to right: Autograph Tower, Luminary Tower
- Alternative names: Thamrin Nine Tower 1 Thamrin Nine Tower 2

Record height
- Tallest in the Southern Hemisphere since 2022^{[I]}
- Preceded by: Q1

General information
- Status: Completed (Luminary + Autograph Tower), Completed (UOB Tower)
- Type: Mixed use
- Location: Jakarta, Indonesia, Thamrin Road, No. 8, 9, and 10
- Construction started: 2014
- Completed: 2022

Height
- Architectural: Autograph Tower – 382.9 m (1,256 ft); Luminary Tower – 382.9 m (1,256 ft); UOB Plaza – 382.9 m (1,256 ft)
- Antenna spire: Autograph Tower – 70 m (230 ft)
- Roof: Autograph Tower – 382.9 m (1,256 ft); Luminary Tower – 382.9 m (1,256 ft); UOB Plaza – 382.9 m (1,256 ft)
- Top floor: Autograph Tower – 382.9 m (1,256 ft); Luminary Tower – 301 m (988 ft); UOB Plaza – 382.9 m (1,256 ft)

Technical details
- Floor count: Autograph Tower – 109 floors Luminary Tower – 62 UOB Plaza – 44 above ground, 4 below
- Floor area: 570,000 square meters
- Lifts/elevators: Installed by Mitsubishi Electric (UOB Plaza) and Schindler Group (Autograph and Luminary Towers)

Design and construction
- Architect: Kohn Pedersen Fox
- Developer: PT Putragaya Wahana
- Structural engineer: Wiratman & Associates
- Main contractor: PT Acset Indonusa Tbk (ACSET)

Website
- thamrinnine.com

Thamrin Nine is a mixed-use development complex in Jakarta, Indonesia. It covers an area of approximately 570,000 square metres with office, retail, residential, hotels, sports and entertainment facilities. Its centrepiece, the Autograph Tower (382.9 m), is the tallest building in the Southern Hemisphere. The complex was envisioned to include three supertall buildings, with a retail podium that connects them, as well as a low-density apartment complex.

The developer of the complex is PT Putragaya Wahana (PGW), who also built the adjacent UOB Plaza. The towers were designed by Kohn Pedersen Fox Associates, while the apartment complex was designed by Wimberly Allison Tong & Goo.

== Autograph Tower ==
Construction of the first tower, named Autograph Tower, topped off in October 2020. At 382.9 meters, it is the tallest building in Indonesia, a record previously held by Gama Tower, and the tallest structure in the Southern Hemisphere, surpassing the Sky Tower in Auckland, New Zealand. The tower, which is connected to Luminary Tower by a shopping mall called Agora, has 109 storeys. There is a three-storey observation deck at floor 56–58 and a Sky Garden area. The lower and middle floors of the tower are occupied by offices, whereas the currently unused upper floors are slated to be occupied by a Waldorf Astoria hotel. It is a class A, green skyscraper with platinum certification and uses up to 30% less energy compared to a conventionally-constructed tower of the same scale.

== Luminary Tower ==
The second tower, named Luminary Tower, has 62 floors and is 304 meters tall. As with the Autograph Tower, the lower and middle floors are used for offices, while the upper floors are used for two hotels operated by Pan Pacific Hotels and Resorts, the 180-key Parkroyal Serviced Suites Jakarta and the 158-key Pan Pacific Jakarta. Opened in 2024, Pan Pacific Jakarta is currently the tallest hotel in Indonesia, beating the record previously held by The Westin Jakarta at Gama Tower.

== Le Parc ==
Thamrin Nine houses a luxury apartment complex on the western side of the skyscrapers, dubbed Le Parc. The complex consists of 114 units, each ranging from 193 to 1,693 m^{2}.

== Third tower ==
Following the topping-out of Luminary Tower in December 2021, PT Putragaya Wahana announced that a third tower is in development. It will include offices, apartments, and a hotel. As of 2024, construction of the tower has not been started.

== See also ==
- List of tallest buildings in the world
- List of tallest buildings in Indonesia
- List of tallest buildings in Jakarta

Records
| Preceded by Q1 | Tallest building in the Southern Hemisphere; 382.9 metres (1,256 ft); 2022–present | Succeeded by Incumbent |
| Preceded by Gama Tower | Tallest building in Indonesia; 382.9 metres (1,256 ft); 2022–present | Succeeded by Incumbent |
