= Q1 (building) =

Tallest building in Australia

Q1 Tower
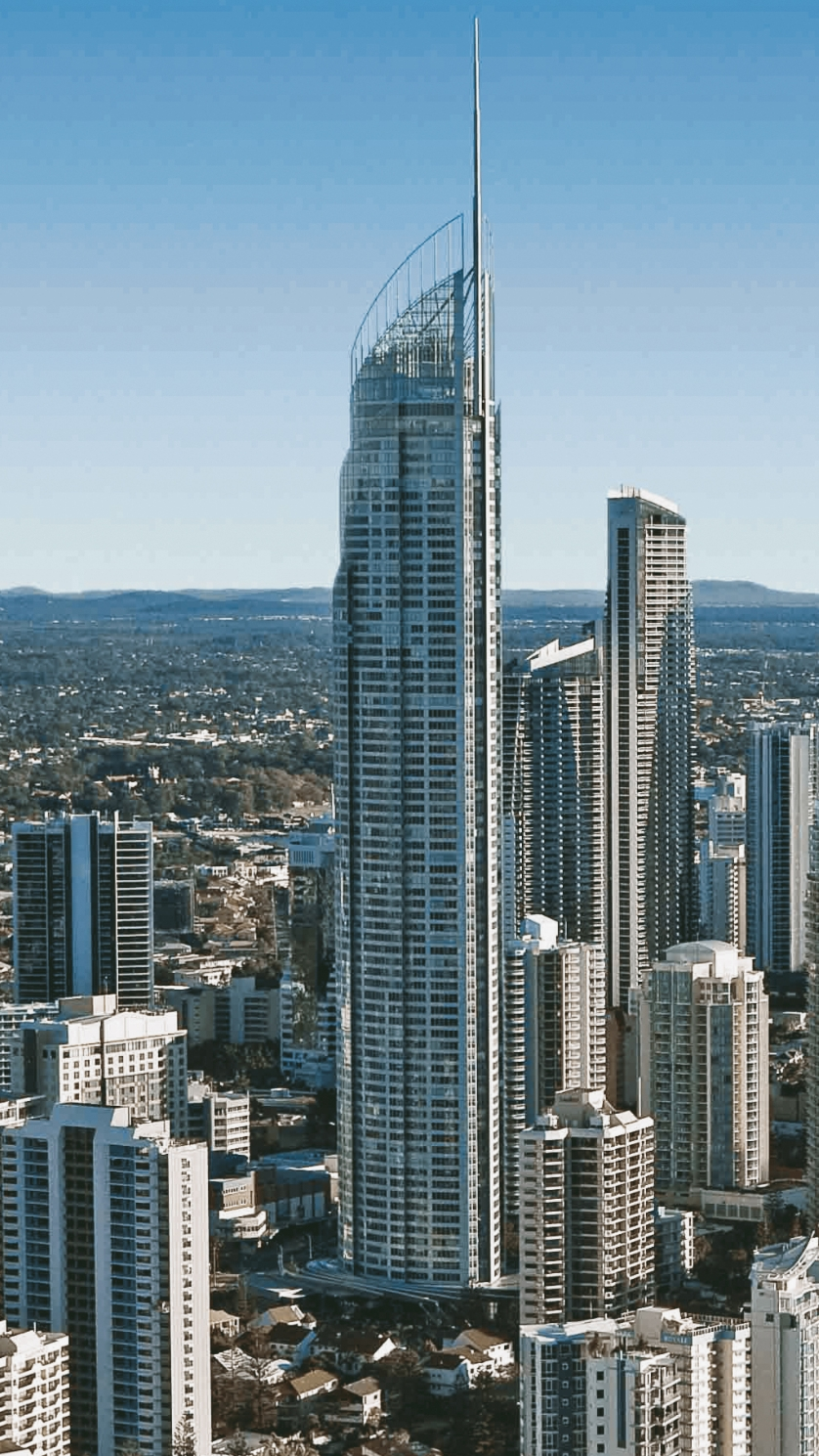
- Q1 Tower is the second-tallest skyscraper in the Southern Hemisphere and the tallest building in Australia

Record height
- Tallest in the Southern Hemisphere from 2005 to 2022^{[I]}
- Preceded by: 120 Collins Street
- Surpassed by: Autograph Tower

General information
- Type: Residential, Observation
- Location: Gold Coast, Queensland, Australia
- Coordinates: 28°00′22″S 153°25′46″E
- Construction started: 2002
- Completed: November 2005
- Cost: $255 million

Height
- Architectural: 322.5 m (1,058 ft)
- Roof: 245 m (804 ft)
- Top floor: 235 m (771 ft)
- Observatory: 235 m (771 ft)

Technical details
- Floor count: 78 (+2 basement floors)
- Floor area: 107,510 m^{2} (1,157,200 sq ft)

Design and construction
- Architects: Buchan Group & Sunland Group
- Developer: Sunland Group
- Main contractor: Sunland Group

Website
- www.q1.com.au

Q1 Tower (an abbreviation of Queensland Number One) is a 322.5-metre (1,058 ft) supertall skyscraper on the Gold Coast, Queensland, Australia. The residential tower on the Gold Coast was the world's tallest residential building from 2005 to 2011. It is the tallest building in Australia, the second tallest building in the Southern Hemisphere, behind the Autograph Tower in Jakarta, Indonesia, and the third-tallest free-standing structure in the Southern Hemisphere, behind the Autograph Tower in Jakarta and the Sky Tower in Auckland, New Zealand. The Q1 officially opened in November 2005.

The landmark building was recognised as one of Queensland's icons during the state's 150th-birthday celebrations.

== Design and construction ==
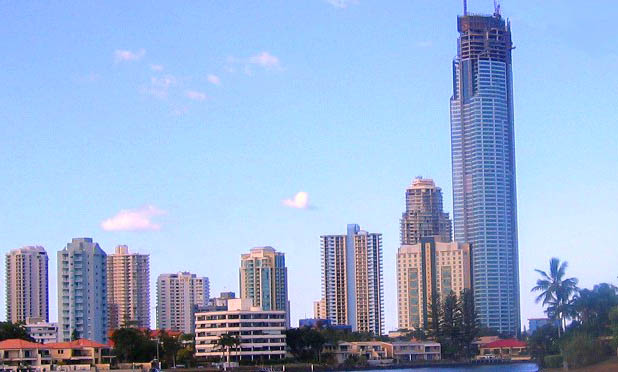
The building under construction in 2005

Q1 Tower was designed by SDG & The Buchan Group, and its form was inspired by the Sydney 2000 Olympic torch and the Sydney Opera House. The name was given in honour of members of Australia's Olympic sculling team of the 1920s – Q1.

The concept was based on studies of wind, movement and tension, in which a series of ribbons wrap concentrically around the tower's exterior and hover above the entry plaza area, providing cover and shade. The tension in the movement and free form are expressed by the gradual twisting of the aluminium-clad ribbons as they move around the building. The result is an open-air galleria-like shopping precinct under the glazed ribbon structure and a curved retail façade to the street edges.

The project was developed by The Sunland Group and built by Sunland Constructions. The building was the Silver Award winner of the 2005 Emporis Skyscraper Award, coming in second to Turning Torso in Sweden.

Q1 was completed towards the end of 2005. Its main point of difference to other high-rise buildings in Surfers Paradise is its glass-enclosed sleek look. Q1's lift lobby is separated into two high-speed lift groups. Four high-speed lifts going 5.0 m/s service levels B2 to level 42. Three separate high-speed lifts going 8.0 m/s service levels 43 to the penthouse on level 74.

The building is supported by 26 piles, each two metres (six point six feet) in diameter, that extend 40 metres (130 ft) into the ground passing through up to four metres (thirteen feet) of solid rock. Q1 contains one-, two- and three-bedroom units. Building facilities include two lagoon swimming pools, a lap pool, gymnasium, small theatre, a ballroom and a spa centre.

An application to construct a walkway around the outside of level 78 was lodged with the Gold Coast City Council in mid-2010.

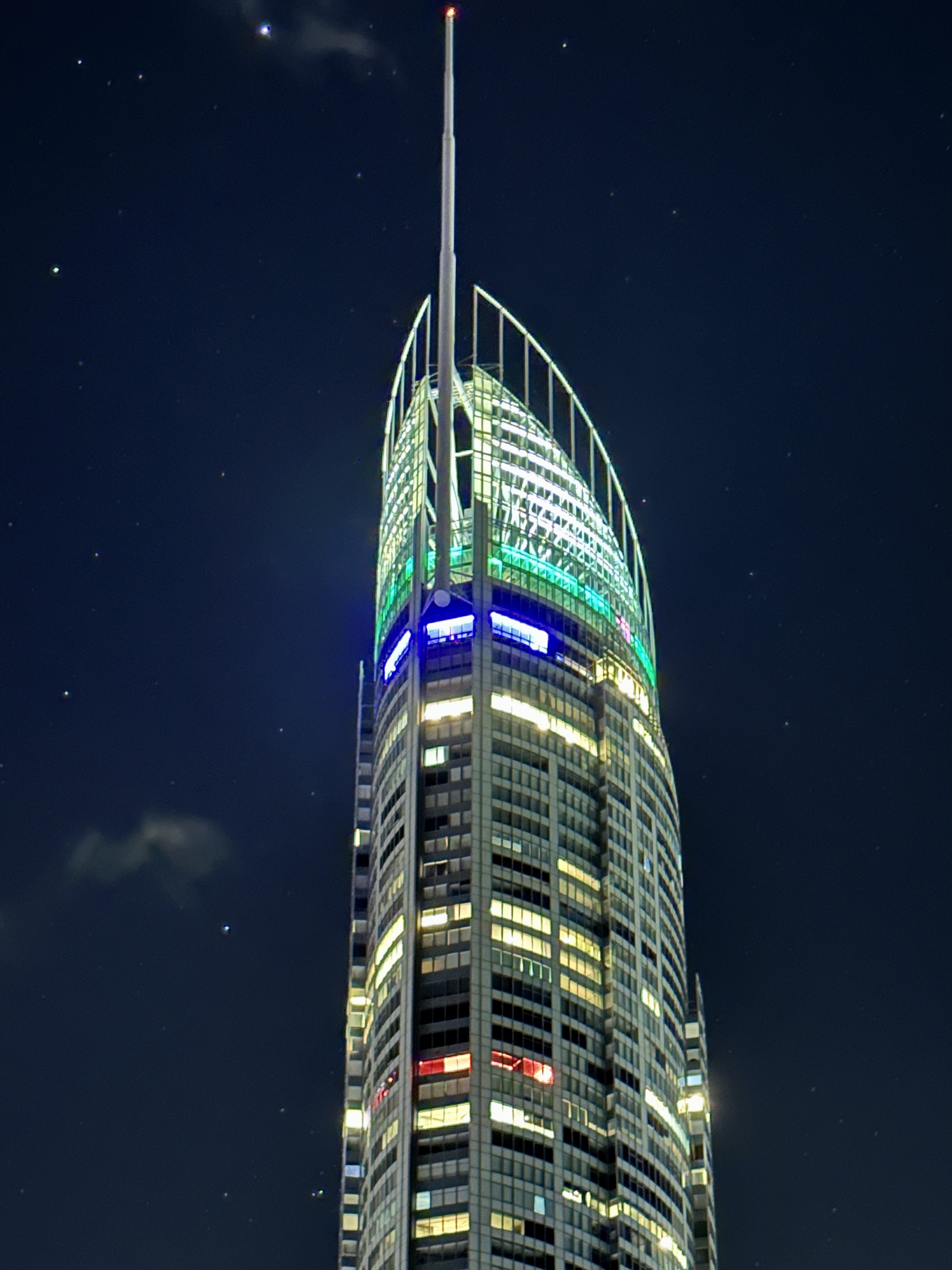
The spire of Q1

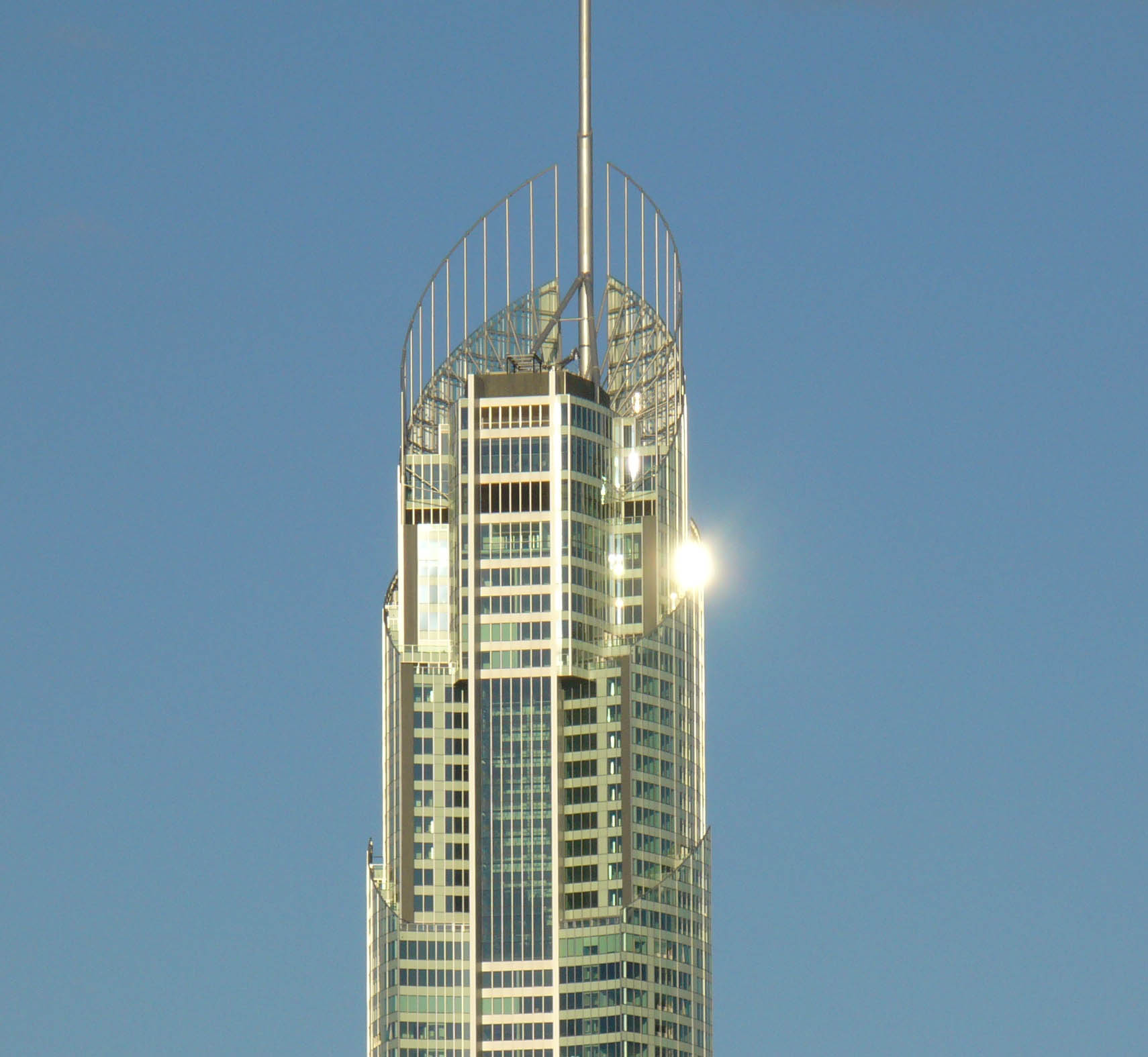
The upper levels of Q1

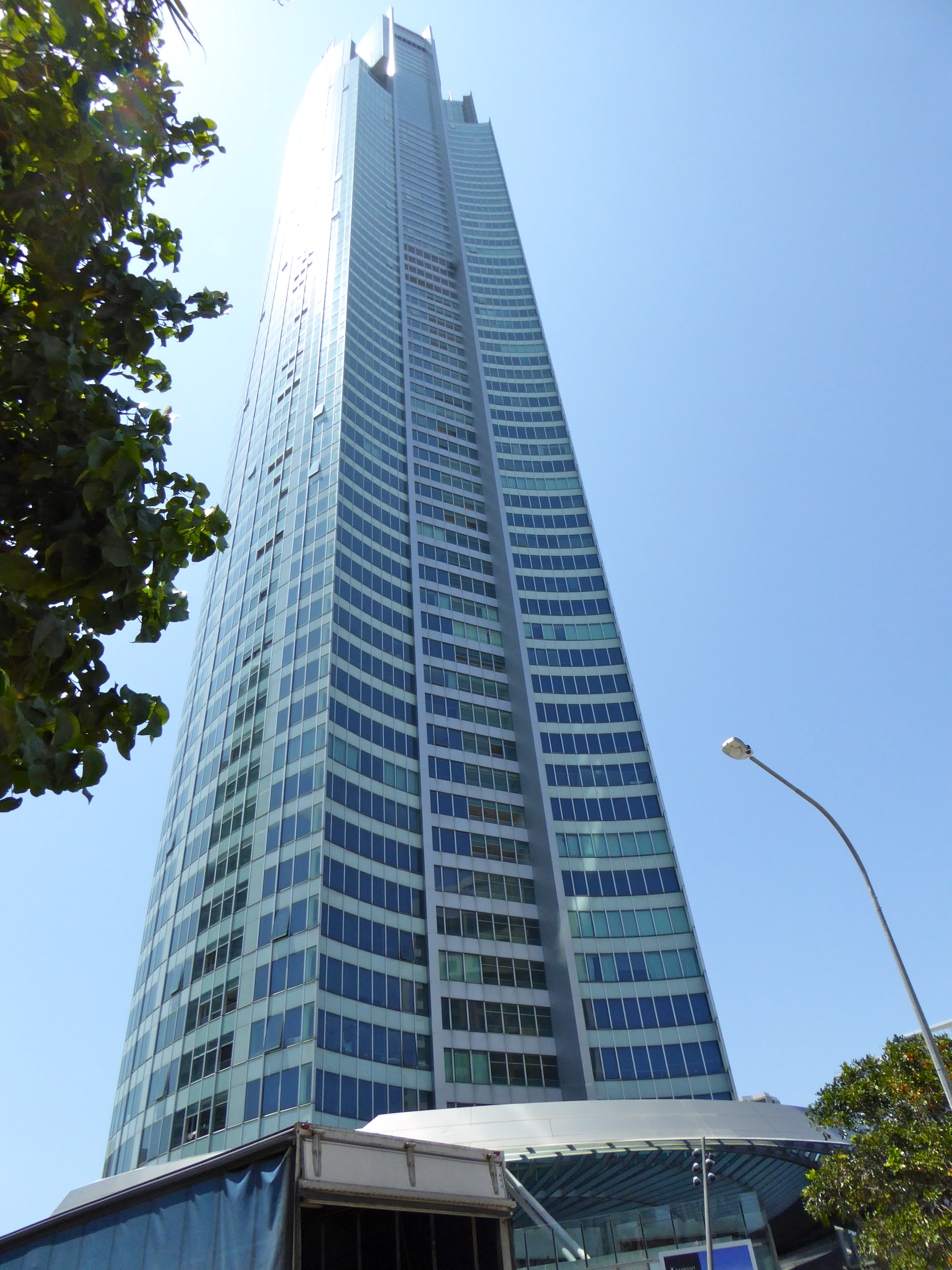
The western end of the tower as viewed from street level

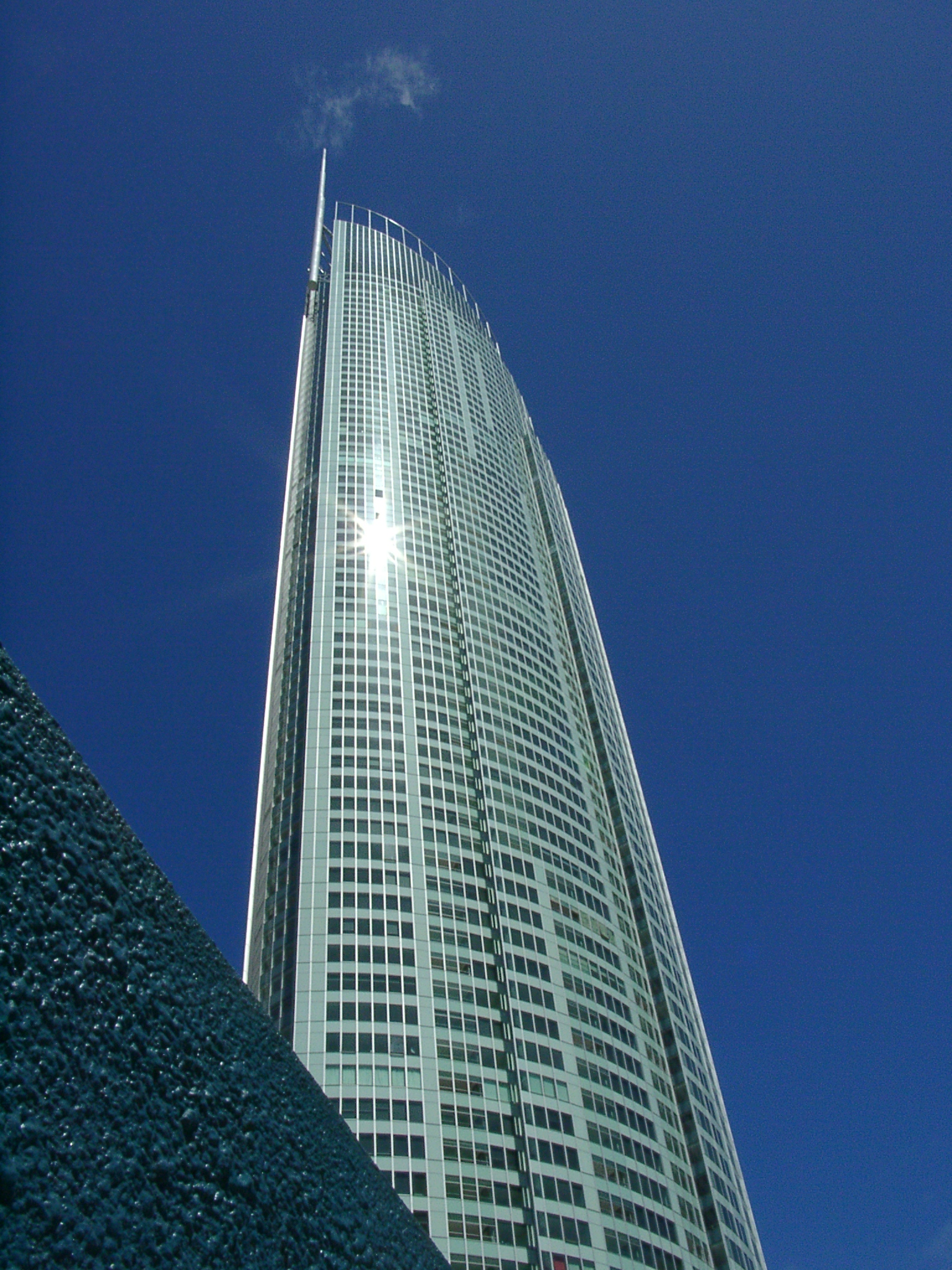
The eastern end of the tower as viewed from street level

== Height ==
At 322.5 metres (1,058 feet) and with a roof height of 245 m (804 ft), Q1 qualifies as the world's 17th tallest all-residential building when measured to the top of its structural point (spire), but is ranked lower behind buildings including Melbourne's Australia 108 (roof height of 316.7 m (1,039 ft)) and the Eureka Tower (roof height of 297.3 m (975 ft)) when measured to its roof height and highest inhabitable floor. However, according to the ranking system developed by the U.S.-based Council on Tall Buildings and Urban Habitat, the main criterion by which buildings are ranked is the height of the top of the spire, qualifying Q1 as the taller.

When the Q1 was completed, it overtook the 21st Century Tower in Dubai, United Arab Emirates to become the world's tallest residential tower. When measured to its structural point, it dwarfs the Gold Coast skyline, with the closest buildings to Q1's height being the 220-metre (720 ft) North Tower of Circle on Cavill and the 243-metre (797 ft) Soul building.

== Awards ==
In 2009 as part of the Q150 celebrations, Q1 was announced as one of the Q150 Icons of Queensland for its role as a "structure and engineering feat".

== Observation deck ==
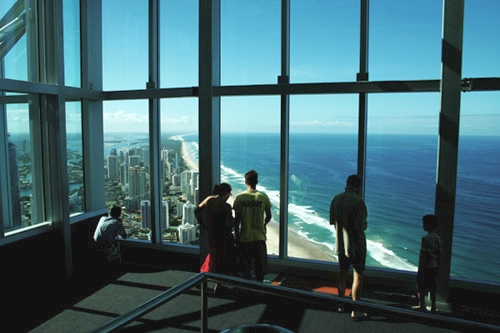
Q1 observation deck view

SkyPoint, formerly known as QDeck, is an observation deck at levels 77 and 78. It is Australia's only beachside observation deck and has room for 400 people. It is 230 metres (750 ft) above the Surfers Paradise beach, giving the public a 360-degree view of Brisbane to the north, the Gold Coast hinterland to the west, Byron Bay, New South Wales, to the south and the Pacific Ocean to the east. The express lift to the observation deck travels the 77 floors in 43 seconds, for a speed of 9.0 m/s.

== Building condition ==
In 2009, reports of disrepair and poor building conditions emerged. Peeling paint which has revealed rusty steel inside and outside, as well as shattered glass panels are amongst the visible concerns. The Building Services Authority has confirmed it has received complaints in relation to the building. The north stairwell was assessed as defective due to the stairwell pressurisation system not meeting the minimum air-flow requirements during a fire emergency. The Building Services Authority asked Q1's builders to rectify the problem in July 2010.

== Events ==
Q1 has been used as a fireworks launch site during New Year's Eve celebrations. The building is one of the most popular destinations for students celebrating schoolies week, despite the body corporate committee treasurer's claims that most of the building's unit owners were opposed to their stay.

On 28 March 2007, two BASE jumpers made an early-morning illegal jump from a northern side apartment. The skydivers pleaded guilty in the Southport Magistrates' Court and were fined A$750 without a conviction being recorded.

At 270 metres (890 ft), the SkyPoint Climb at Q1 is Australia's highest external building climb.

Q1 has been holding an annual Stair Climb event for a number of years.

== Gallery ==
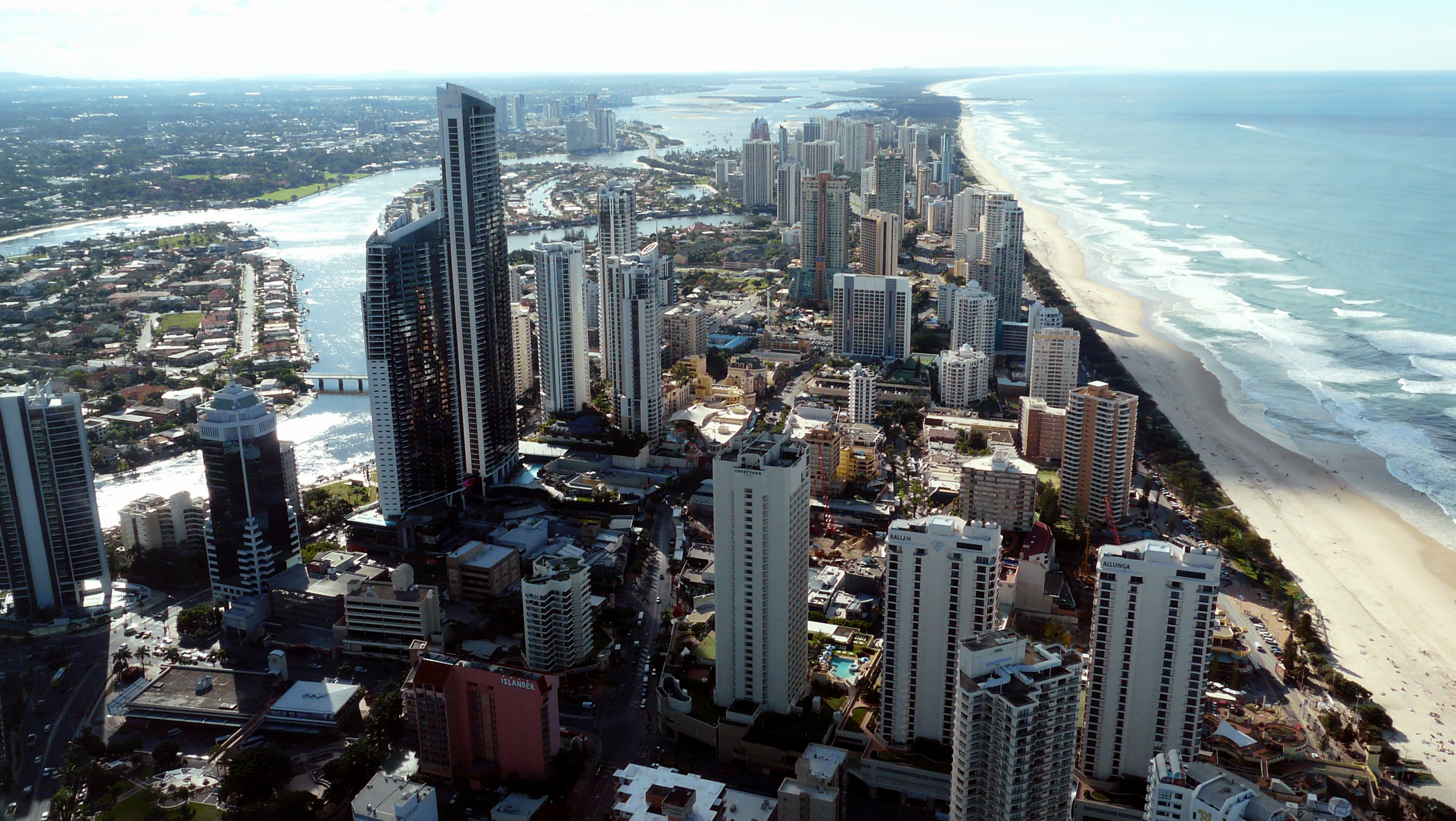
North view from the QDeck

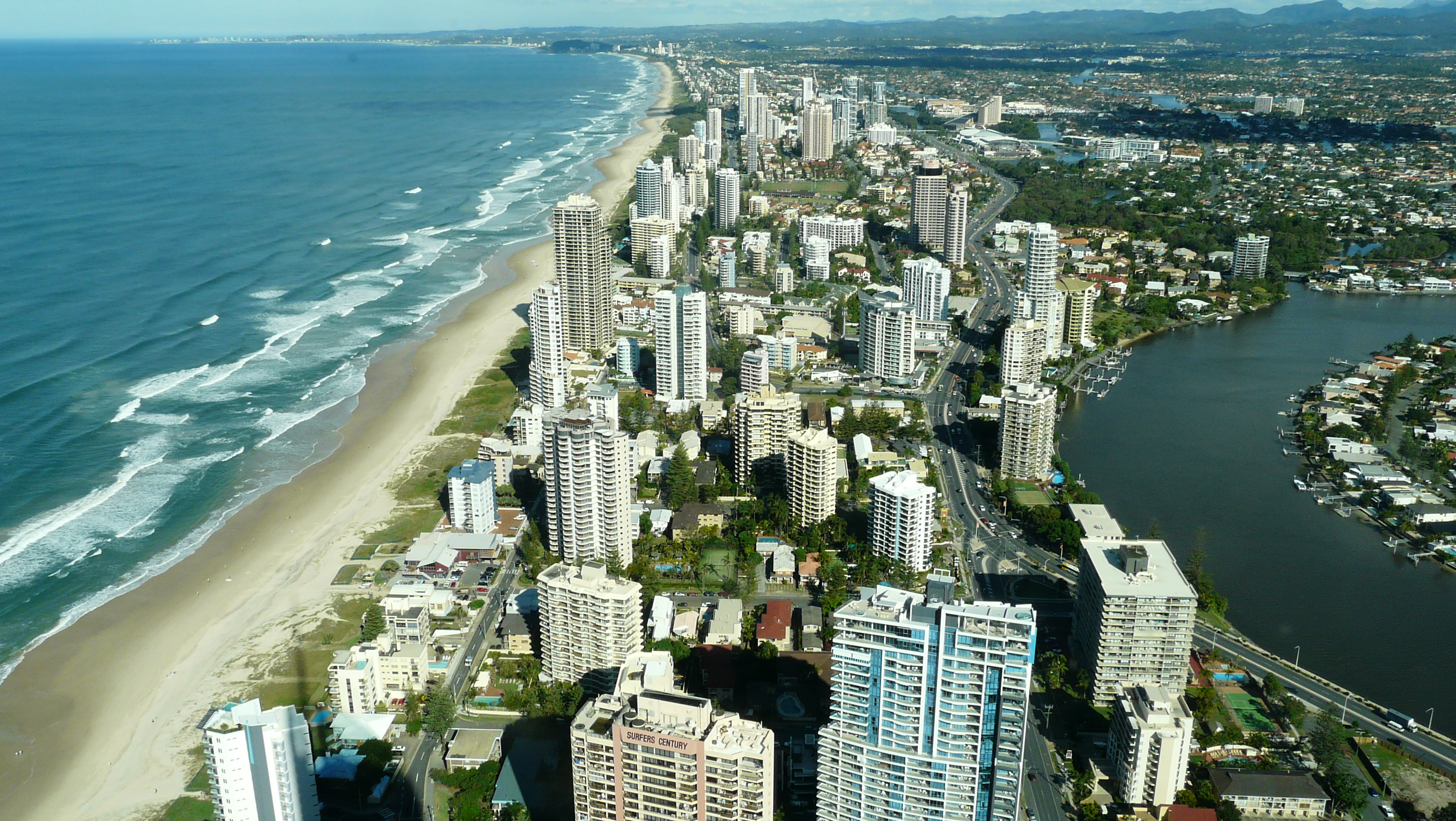
Looking south down the coast

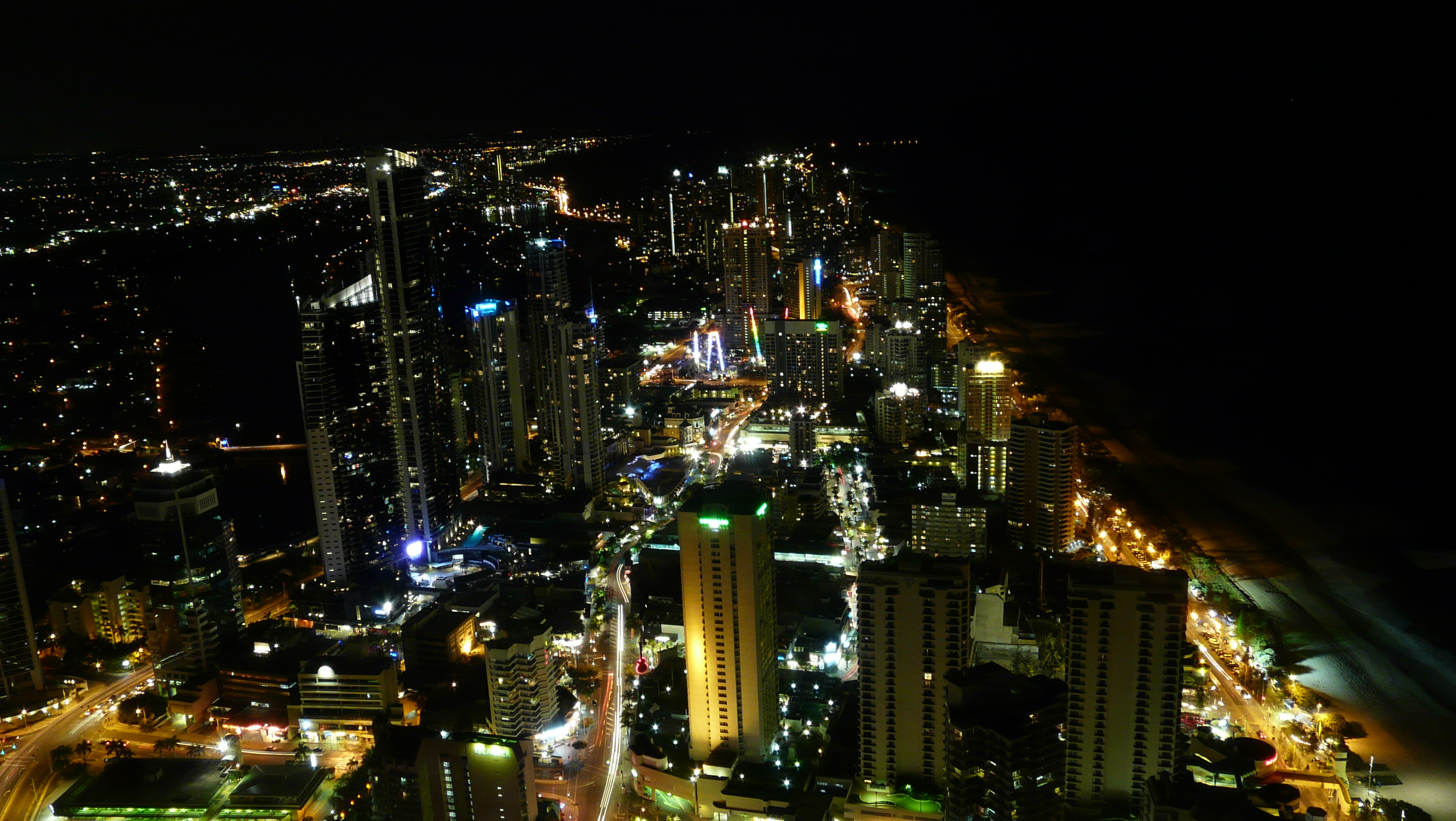
A night-time view north

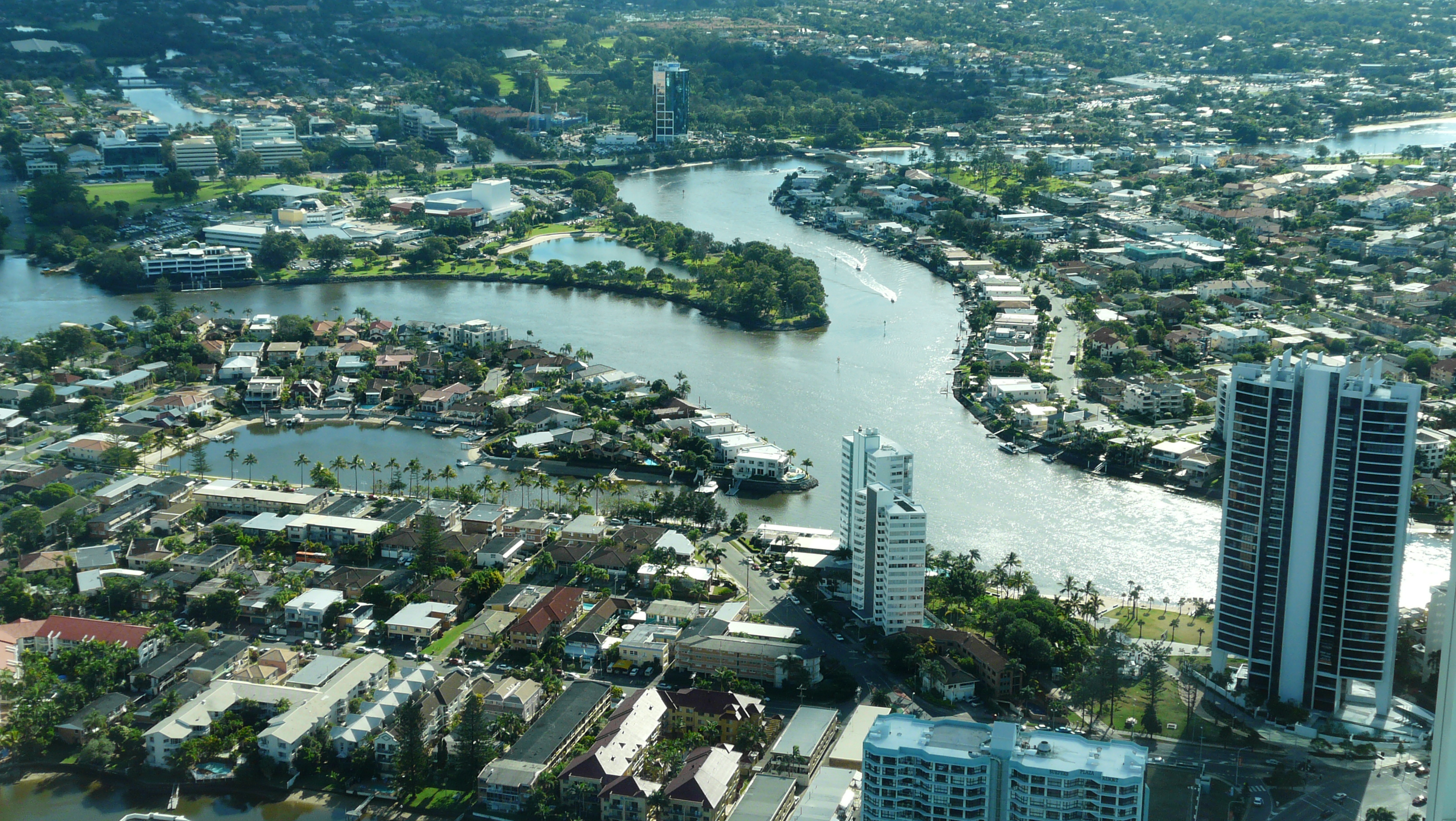
Inland toward the west

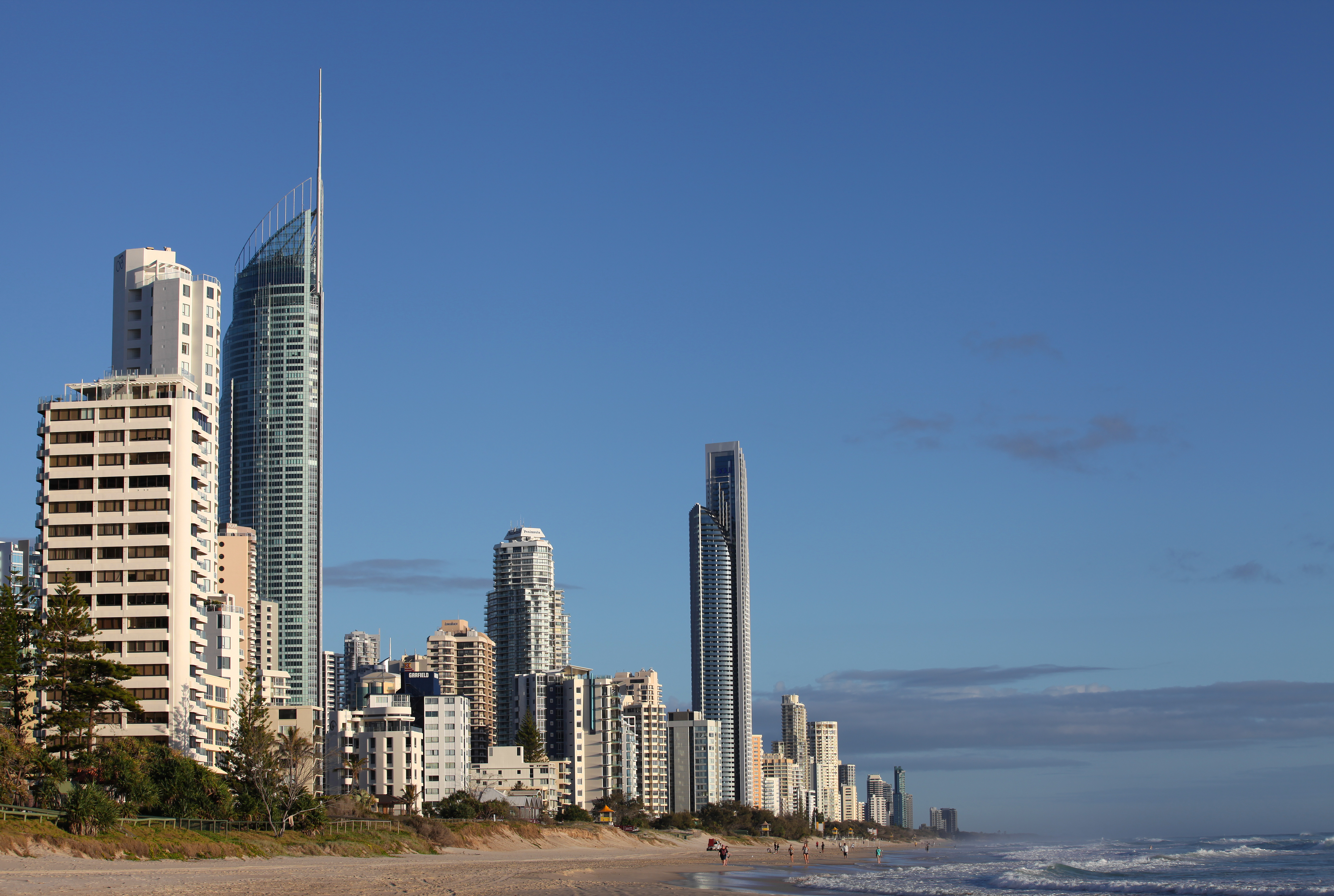
Surfers Paradise, Gold Coast

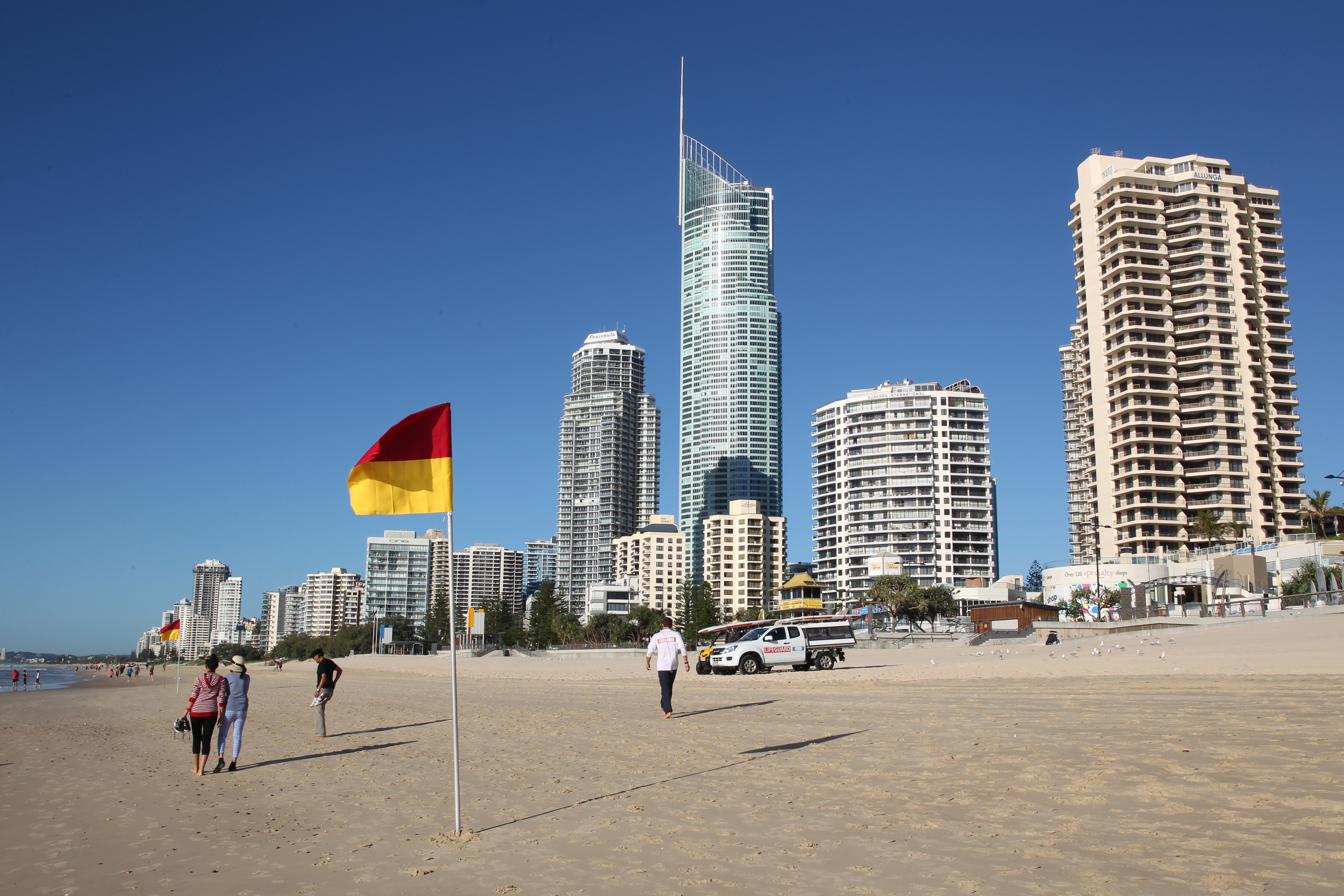
Q1 as viewed from Surfers Paradise Beach

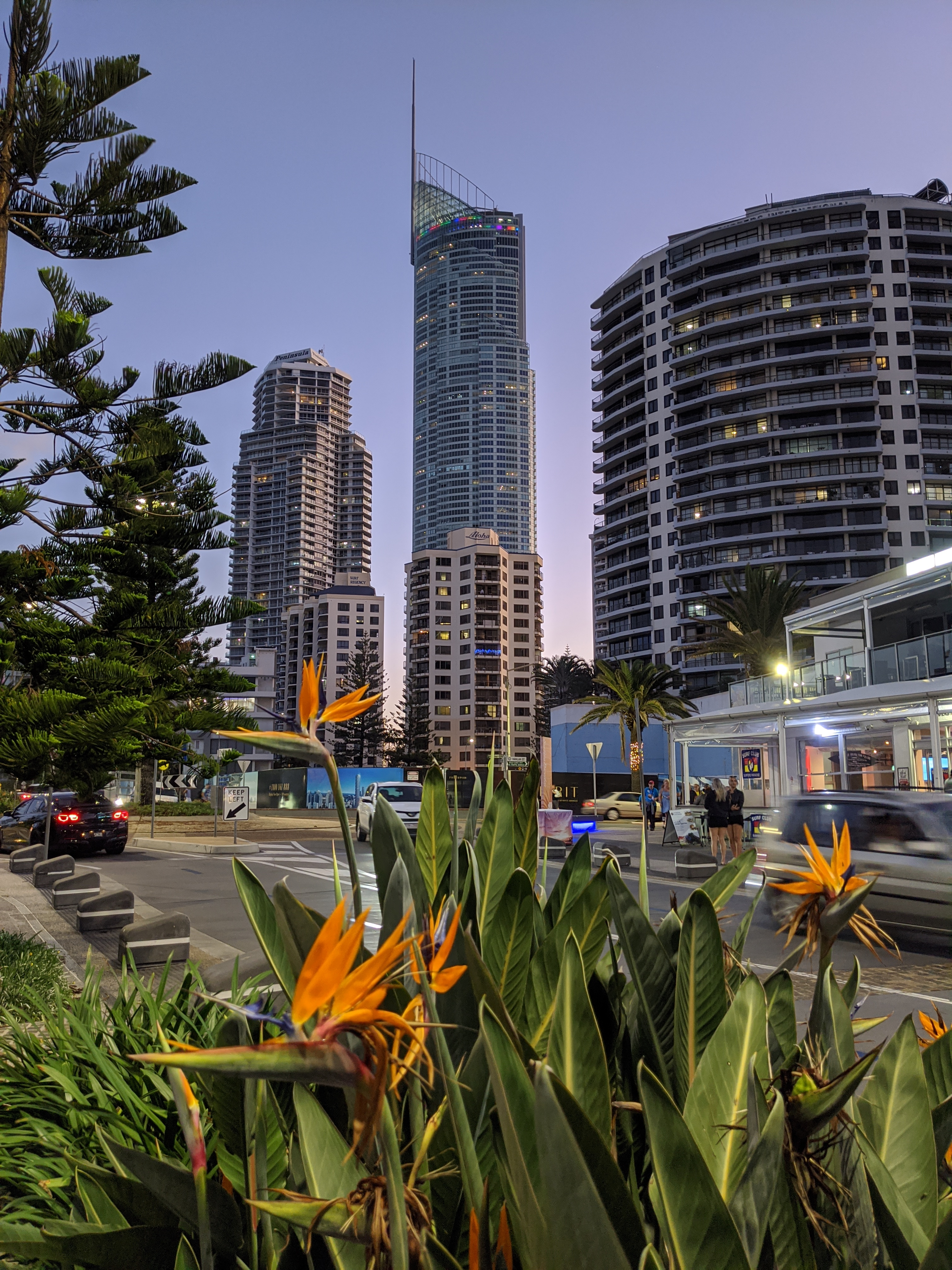
Q1 viewed from The Esplanade

== See also ==
- D1
- List of skyscrapers
- List of tallest buildings in Australia
- List of tallest buildings on the Gold Coast, Queensland
- List of tallest freestanding structures in the world

Records
Preceded by 21st Century Tower (Dubai)	Tallest all-residential building in the world 322.5-metre (1,058 ft); 2005–2011	Succeeded by The Marina Torch (Dubai)
Preceded by 120 Collins Street (Melbourne)	Tallest building in Australia; 322.5-metre (1,058 ft); 2005–present	Succeeded by Incumbent
Preceded by 120 Collins Street	Tallest building in the Southern Hemisphere; 322.5-metre (1,058 ft); 2005–2022	Succeeded by Autograph Tower
Awards
Preceded by Torre Agbar (Barcelona)	Emporis Skyscraper Award (Silver); 2005	Succeeded by The Wave (Gold Coast)
