= List of tallest buildings in the Southern Hemisphere =

The Southern Hemisphere, which comprises parts of South America, Africa, Southeast Asia and Oceania, has until recently not been home to many tall buildings outside of Argentina, Australia and South Africa. The late twentieth century saw an increase in South American high-rises, but most new skyscrapers in the region have been built since 1990. As part of a global boom in skyscraper construction, countries such as Australia and Indonesia built many high-rises and skyscrapers in the early 21st century.

Today, cities like Jakarta, Melbourne and São Paulo have some of the most dominant skylines in the world.

== Tallest buildings ==
Listed below is every building in the Southern Hemisphere with a height of 250 metres (820 ft) or more.

**Bold**	Denotes building that is or was once the tallest in the Southern Hemisphere
u	Number of underground floors

Rank	Name	Image	City	Country	Height		Floors	Built	Notes
Rank	Name	Image	City	Country	m	ft	Floors	Built	Notes
1	**Autograph Tower**		Jakarta	Indonesia	382.9	1,256	75 (+6 u)	2022	Tallest building in Indonesia, sixth tallest building in Southeast Asia. To the right of it is the Luminary Tower.
2	**Q1**		Gold Coast	Australia	322.5	1,058	78 (+2 u)	2005	Tallest building in Australia
3	Australia 108		Melbourne	Australia	316.7	1,039	100 (+1 u)	2020	Tallest building in Melbourne and tallest building in Australia by roof height.
4	Luminary Tower		Jakarta	Indonesia	304	997	62	2022	To the left of it is the Autograph Tower.
5	Gran Torre Santiago		Santiago	Chile	300	984	62 (+6 u)	2013	Tallest building in South America.
6	Eureka Tower		Melbourne	Australia	297.3	975	91 (+1 u)	2006	Featuring Australia’s highest observation deck.
7=	Yachthouse Residence Club (Tower 1)		Balneário Camboriú	Brazil	294.1	920	80	2023	Tallest building in Brazil.
7=	Yachthouse Residence Club (Tower 2)		Balneário Camboriú	Brazil	294.1	920	80	2023	Tallest building in Brazil.
9	One Tower		Balneário Camboriú	Brazil	290	951	77	2022	
10	Azure Tower		Jakarta	Indonesia	288	945	77	2024	
11	Gama Tower		Jakarta	Indonesia	285.5	937	64 (+4 u)	2016	
12	Treasury Tower		Jakarta	Indonesia	279.5	917	57	2018	
13	Brisbane Skytower		Brisbane	Australia	274.3	900	90 (+10 u)	2019	Tallest building in Brisbane since 2019. Largest residential building in the Southern Hemisphere since 2019 with a gross floor area of 147,000sqm. First skyscraper in Australia to be built on an equilateral triangle footprint. First building in the world to be built with a height adjustable tower crane. Tallest building completed in Australia in the 2010s.
14	The One		Brisbane	Australia	274	899	81	2021	
15	Crown Sydney		Sydney	Australia	271.3	890	71 (+4 u)	2020	Tallest building in Sydney.
16	Aurora Melbourne Central		Melbourne	Australia	270.5	887	85	2019	
17	West Side Place Tower A		Melbourne	Australia	268.7	882	81	2021	
18	1 William Street		Brisbane	Australia	267	876	46 (+3 u)	2016	Tallest building in Brisbane from 2016 to 2019.
19	Jakarta Mori Tower		Jakarta	Indonesia	266	873	57	2022	
20	**120 Collins Street**		Melbourne	Australia	265	869	52	August 1991	Tallest building in the Southern Hemisphere from August 1991 to 2005.
21	Salesforce Tower		Sydney	Australia	263.1	869	58 (+4 u)	2022	
22	Infinity Tower		Brisbane	Australia	262	860	81 (+9 u)	2014	Tallest building in Brisbane from 2014 to 2016
23	Wisma 46		Jakarta	Indonesia	261.9	859	46	1996	
24	Menara Astra		Jakarta	Indonesia	261.5	858	47	2017	
25	**101 Collins Street**		Melbourne	Australia	260	853	50	March 1991	Briefly the tallest building in the Southern Hemisphere between March and August 1991.
26=	Prima Pearl		Melbourne	Australia	254	833	72	2014	
26=	Equinox Tower		Jakarta	Indonesia	254	833	?	2024	
28	Raffles Hotel		Jakarta	Indonesia	253.3	831	52	2015	
29	Central Park		Perth	Australia	252.9	830	52 (+4 u)	1992	
30	Queens Place North Tower		Melbourne	Australia	252.8	829	79	2021	
31	Ocean		Gold Coast	Australia	252.3	828	75	2022	
32	The Pakubuwono Signature		Jakarta	Indonesia	252	827	50	2014	
33	**Rialto Towers**		Melbourne	Australia	251.1	824	63	1986	Tallest building in the Southern Hemisphere from 1986 to 1991.

== Timeline of tallest buildings ==
	Building	Image	City	Country	Height in metres (ft)	Years tallest	Floors
1	Martinelli Building		São Paulo	Brazil	105 (344)	1929–1936	28
2	Kavanagh Building		Buenos Aires	Argentina	120 (394)	1936–1947	30
3	Altino Arantes Building		São Paulo	Brazil	161 (529)	1947–1960	40
4	Mirante do Vale		São Paulo	Brazil	170 (558)	1960–1973	51
5	Carlton Centre		Johannesburg	South Africa	223 (730)	1973–1977	50
6	25 Martin Place		Sydney	Australia	228 (748)	1977–1986	67
7	Rialto Towers		Melbourne	Australia	251.1 (823)	1986–1991	55
8	101 Collins Street		Melbourne	Australia	260 (850)	1991	57
9	120 Collins Street		Melbourne	Australia	265 (869)	1991–2005	52
10	Q1		Gold Coast	Australia	322.5 (1,058)	2005–2022	78
11	Autograph Tower		Jakarta	Indonesia	382.9 (1,256)	2022–present	75

== Cities with the most skyscrapers ==
Listed below are the cities in the Southern Hemisphere with the most skyscrapers. A skyscraper is considered an occupied building measuring over 150 metres (492 ft).

Rank	City	Country	Image	Number of skyscrapers	Rank worldwide
1	Jakarta	Indonesia		117	#14
2	Melbourne	Australia		79	#24
3	Sydney	Australia		47	#39
4	Balneário Camboriú	Brazil		32	#54
5	Brisbane	Australia		23	#68
6	São Paulo	Brazil		22	#70
7	Buenos Aires	Argentina		12	#=104
8	Gold Coast	Australia		12	#=104
9	Surabaya	Indonesia		11	#108
10	Auckland	New Zealand		7	#144

== See also ==
- List of tallest buildings in South America
- List of tallest buildings in Brazil
- List of tallest buildings in Indonesia
- List of tallest buildings in Australia
- List of tallest buildings in Oceania
- List of tallest buildings in Africa
