= 25 Martin Place =

Skyscraper in Sydney, Australia

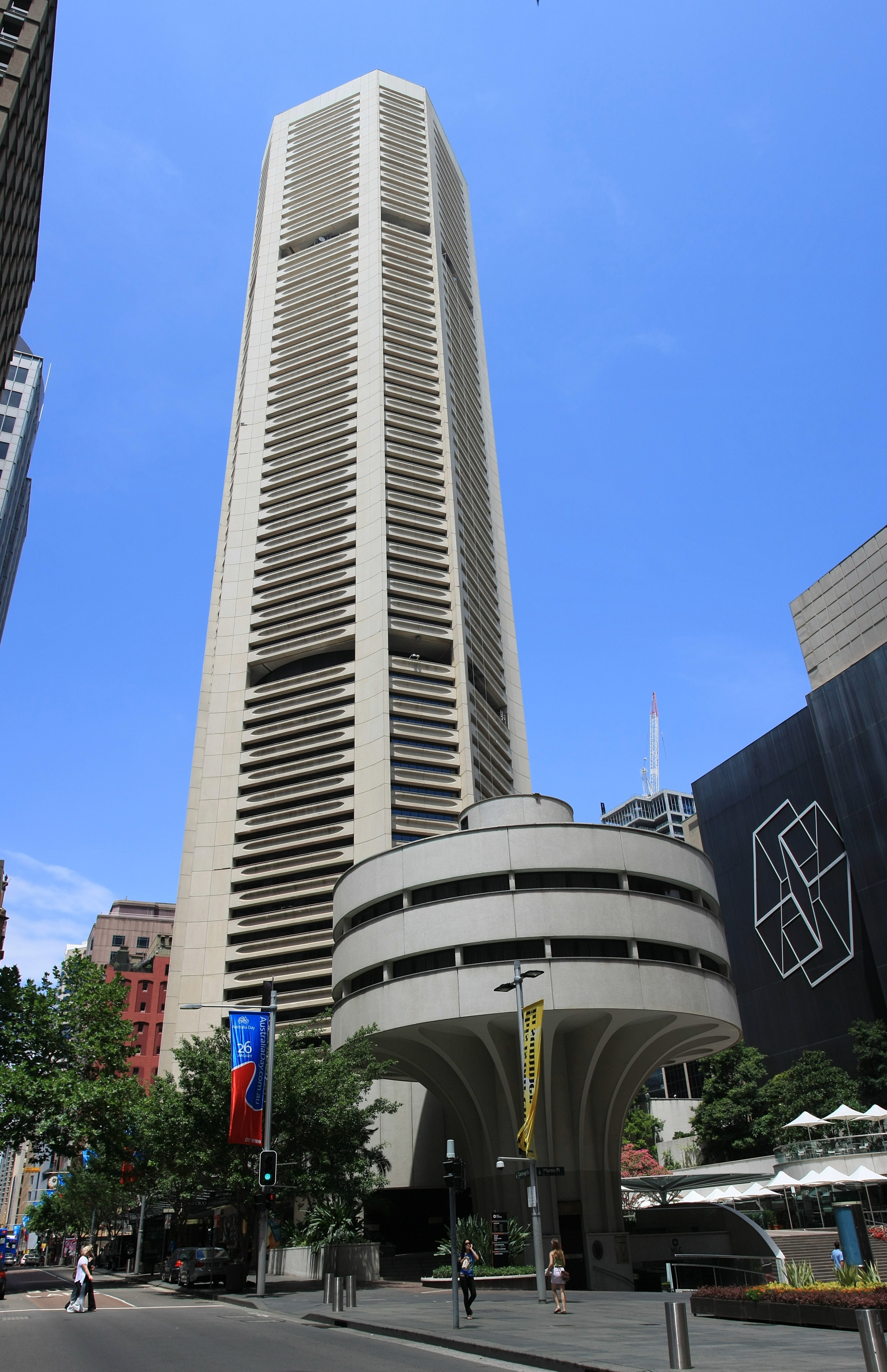
- MLC Centre Sydney
- Former names: MLC Centre

General information
- Status: Completed
- Type: Commercial
- Location: 19–29 Martin Place, Sydney
- Coordinates: 33.868019°S 151.20932400000004°E
- Construction started: 1972
- Completed: 1975
- Opening: 1977; 49 years ago
- Cost: $200,000,000
- Owner: Dexus

Height
- Roof: 228 m (748 ft)

Technical details
- Floor count: 67
- Floor area: 67,000 m^{2} (720,000 sq ft)
- Lifts/elevators: 26

Design and construction
- Architect: Harry Seidler
- Developer: MLC Limited
- Main contractor: Civil & Civic
- Awards: Sir John Sulman Medal 1983, Lloyd Rees Civic Design Award, 1981

Website
- www.25martinplace.com.au
List of tallest buildings in Australia
Next Shortest Governor Phillip Tower; 227m	Next Tallest World Tower; 230m
Heights are to highest architectural element.
Preceded by Quay Quarter Tower	Tallest building in Australia; 1977–1986	Succeeded by Rialto Towers
Preceded by Carlton Centre	Tallest building in the Southern Hemisphere; 1977–1986	Succeeded by Rialto Towers

25 Martin Place is a skyscraper in Sydney, Australia. It was originally named the MLC Centre for around 45 years, after the building owner MLC Limited, and is still commonly referred to by that name. In 2021 the name was removed by its owner, Dexus, which now refers to and markets the building simply by its street address of 25 Martin Place.

== Design and construction ==
The building's construction was controversial, since it brought about the demolition in 1971 and 1972 of the famous 19th century Australia Hotel, the Theatre Royal, and the splendid Commercial Travellers Club building on the corner of Martin Place and Castlereagh Street, all of which formerly stood on the amalgamated site.

Designed by architect Harry Seidler, it stands at a height of 228 metres (748 ft) with 67 storeys, and remains one of his most definitive works. The building was awarded the 1983 Sir John Sulman Medal by the Australian Institute of Architects. The contractor was Civil & Civic. It was officially opened by the Governor-General, Sir Zelman Cowen, in September 1978.

== Location and features ==
The building is a stark white, modernist column in an octagonal floorplan, with eight massive load-bearing columns in the corners that taper slightly towards the top. It is one of the world's tallest reinforced concrete buildings and was one of the tallest buildings in the world outside North America at the time of its completion. The MLC Centre was Sydney's tallest office building from 1977 to 1992. The MLC Centre is wholly owned by Dexus, which acquired a half-stake in the property from the Queensland Investment Corporation in June 2017 and bought out its former co-owner, the GPT Group, in March 2019. The MLC Centre was also Australia's tallest building for nine years until losing the title to the Rialto Towers in Melbourne in 1986.

Occupants include the Taipei Economic and Cultural Office in Sydney (TECO), Cognizant, Servcorp, and former Prime Minister of Australia, John Howard. The podium of the building includes a shopping centre and a 1,186-seat theatre, the Theatre Royal.

The building underwent a $100m repair project which installed hybrid corrosion protection to the facade. The project retained the original appearance of the structure but remedied damage to exposed aggregate precast concrete facade panels caused by expansive corrosion of steel reinforcement. In June 2021, it was rebranded from the MLC Centre to 25 Martin Place.

== In popular culture ==
The building was the headquarters of the fictitious "Harper Mining" company in the opulent 1980's television soap opera Return to Eden.

The building was the centre of the storyline in the first episode of the Australian television drama, Police Rescue, airing in 1991. Sergeant Steve "Mickey" McClintock (Gary Sweet) is seen abseiling off the top of the building in the first half of the episode to persuade a man threatening to commit suicide not to jump.

25 Martin Place was also prominently featured in the music video for Anthem for the Year 2000 by Australian rock band Silverchair. Released in 1999 as the lead single from their third album, Neon Ballroom, the video includes exterior and interior shots of the building, using its façade and modernist architectural details as a backdrop to the song's themes of youthful rebellion and societal critique. Participants in the music video recall meeting at Martin Place for the filming, which involved thousands of Silverchair fans. The appearance helped cement the building's recognition among a wider Australian audience during the late 1990s and is occasionally noted in media and fan references to the band's early career.

== Gallery ==
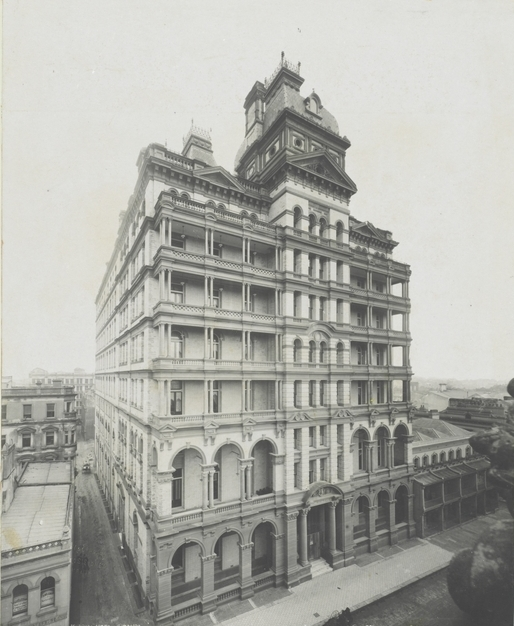
The Australia Hotel, 1903, demolished in 1971 for the MLC Centre.

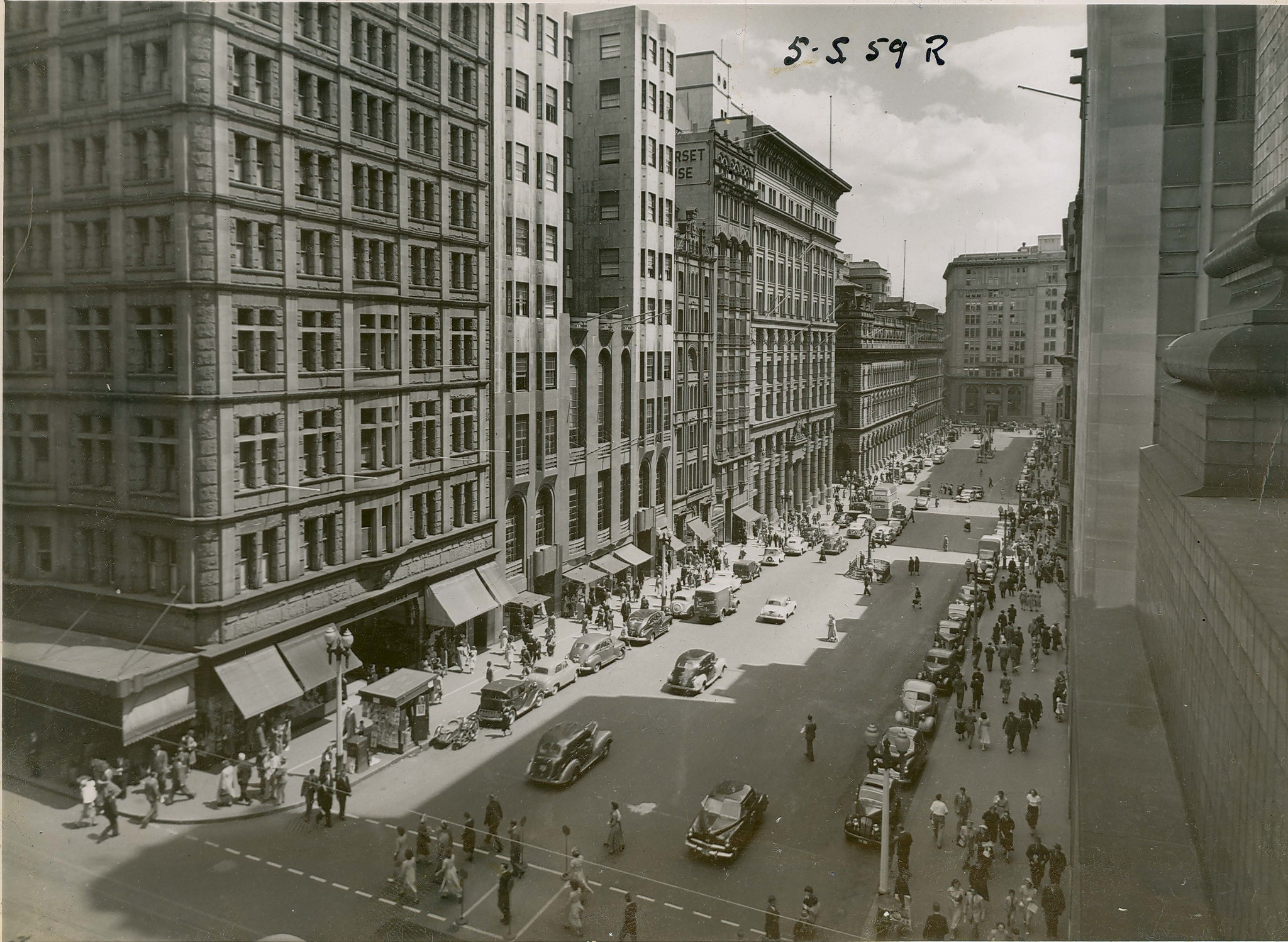
View of Martin Place in 1959, showing former Commercial Travellers Club Building and Australia Hotel, demolished for the MLC Centre.

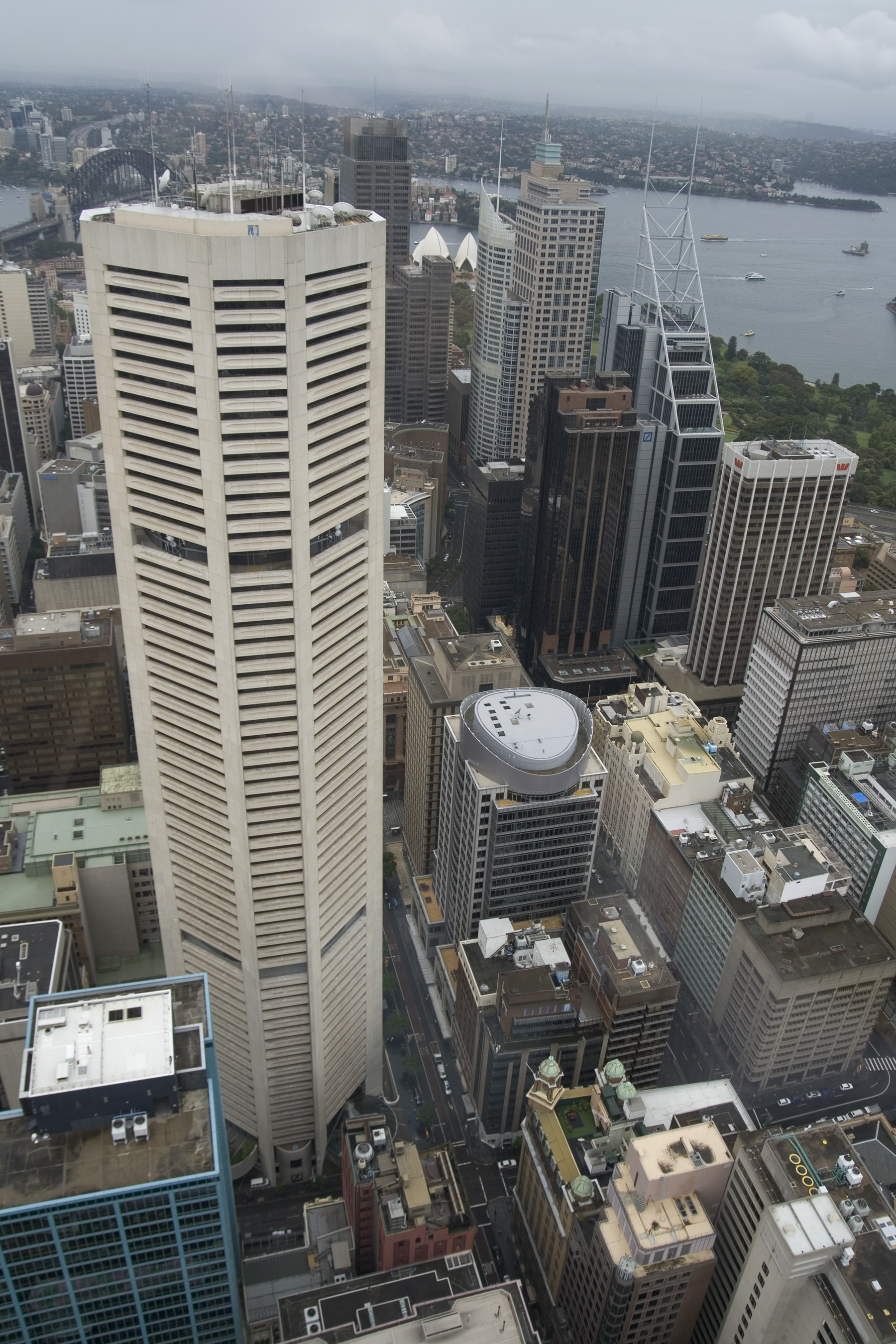
View from Sydney Tower.

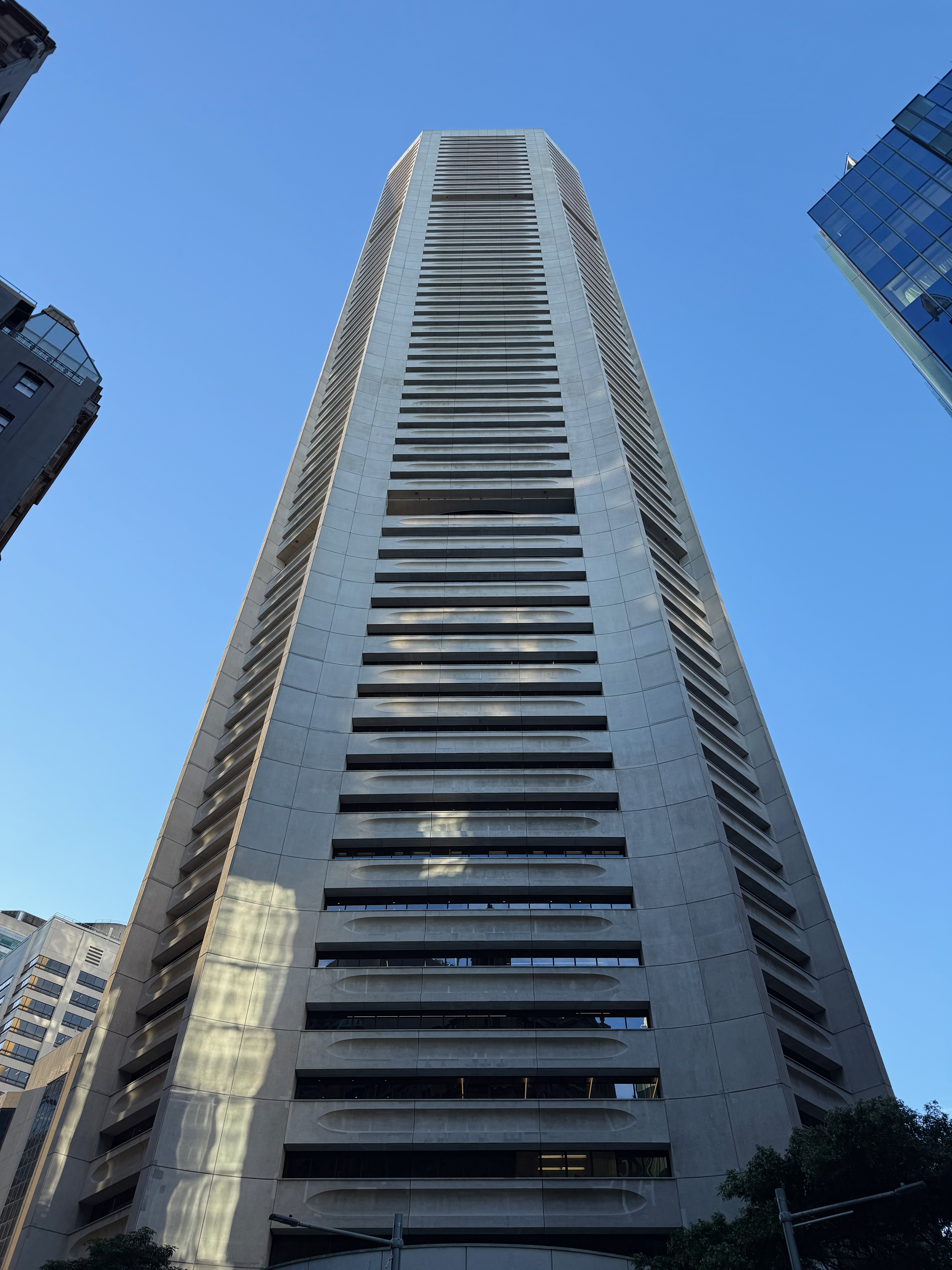
View from King and Castlereagh Streets.

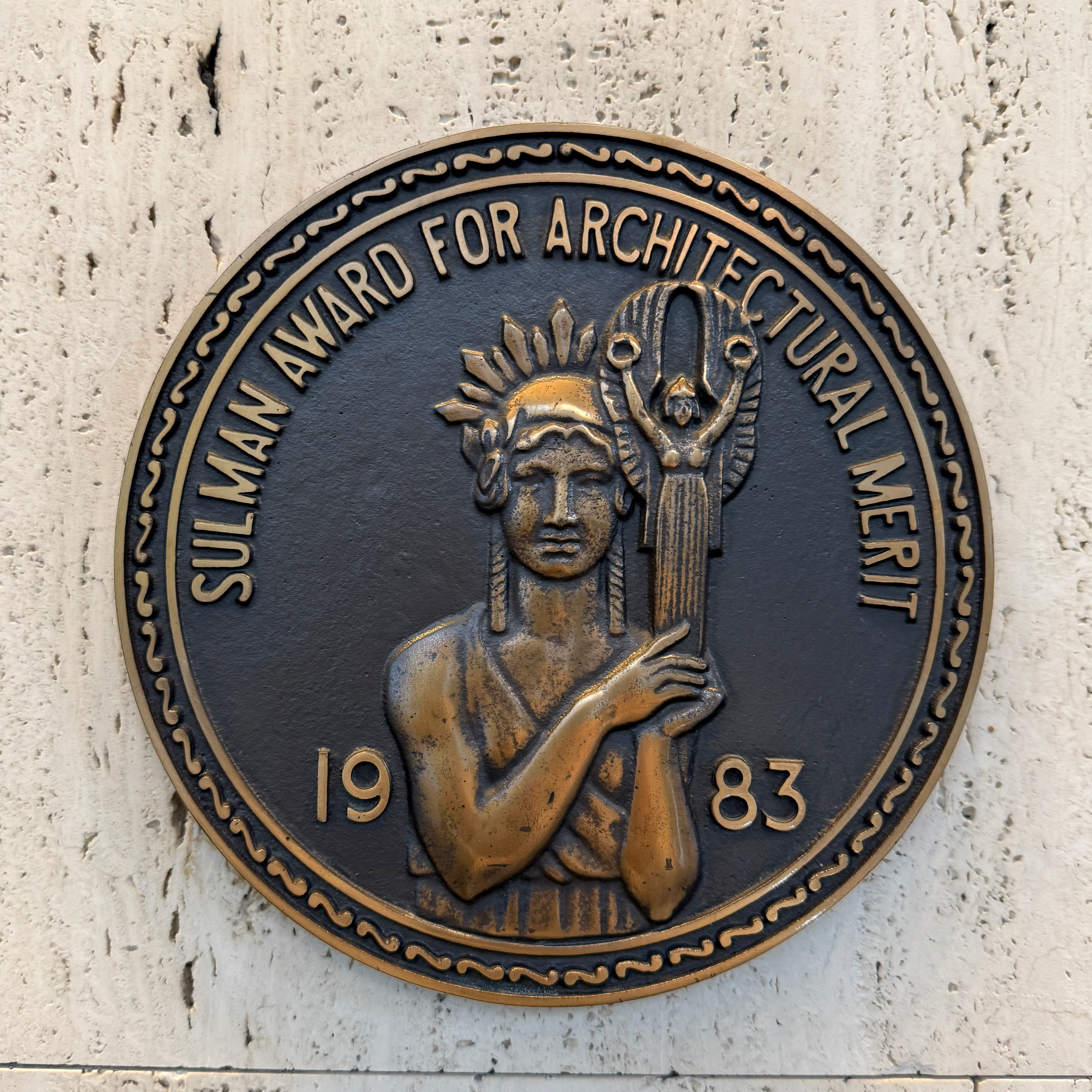
1983 Sir John Sulman Medal affixed to plaza wall.

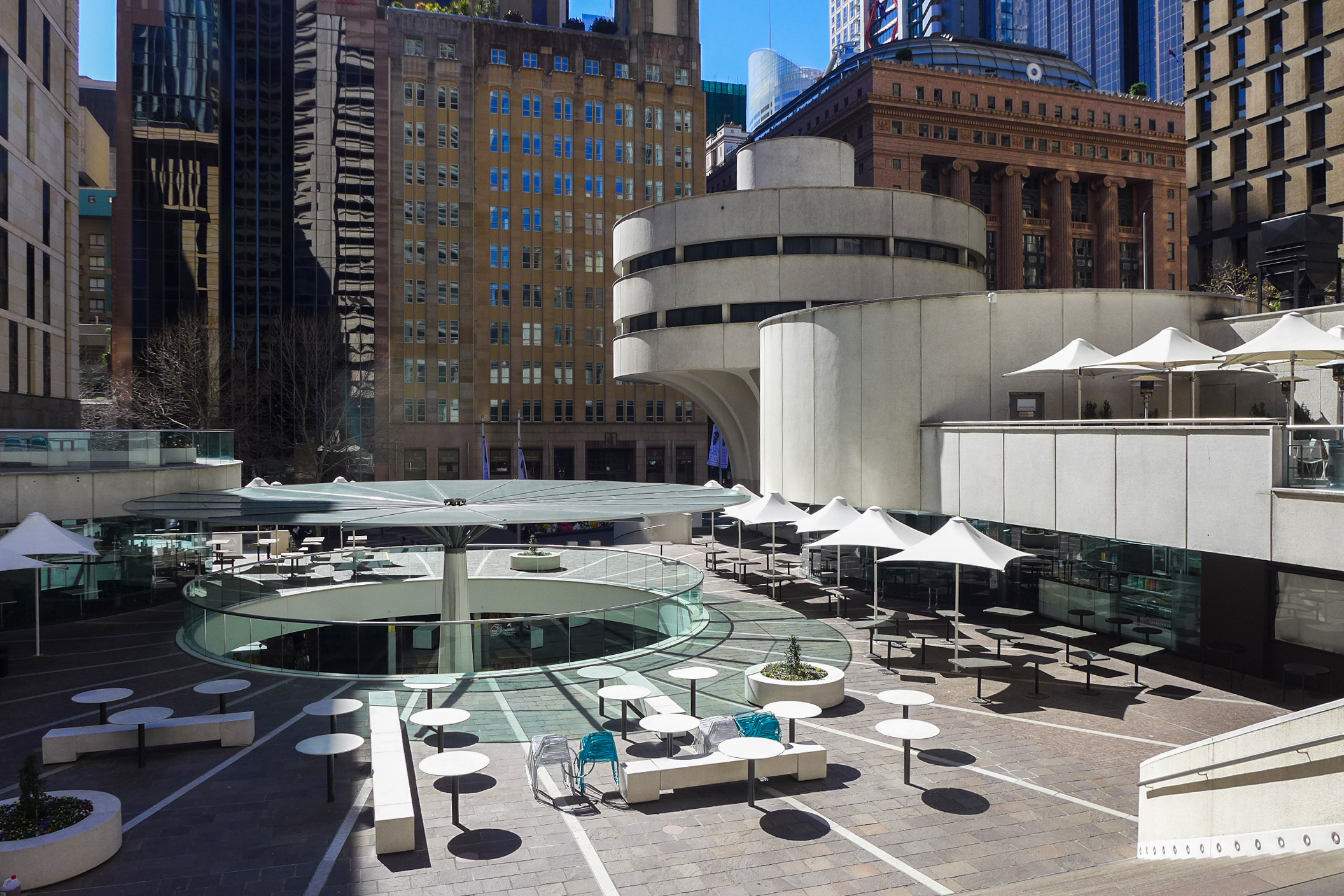
Podium plaza, 2017

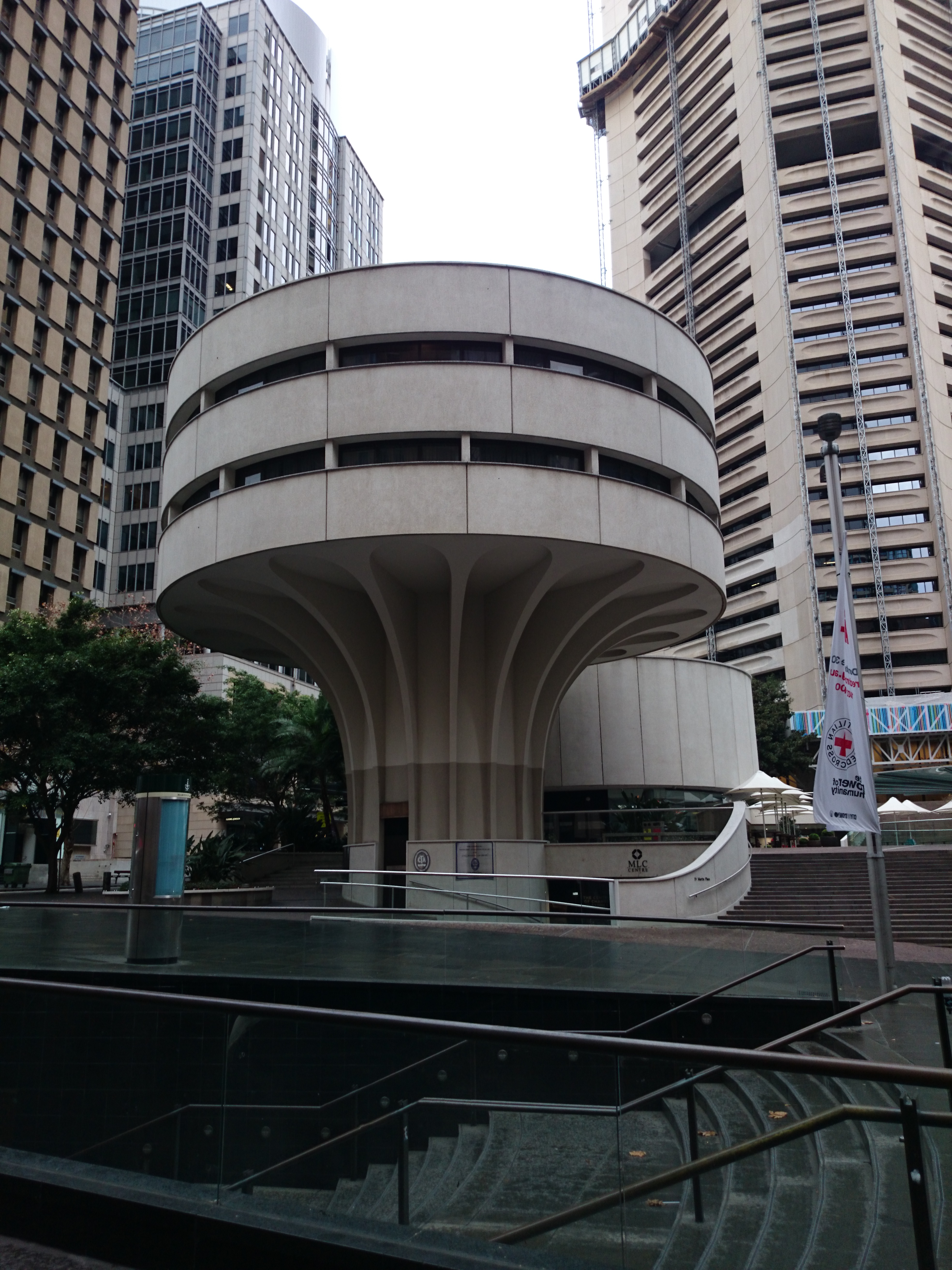
Commercial Travellers' Association building.

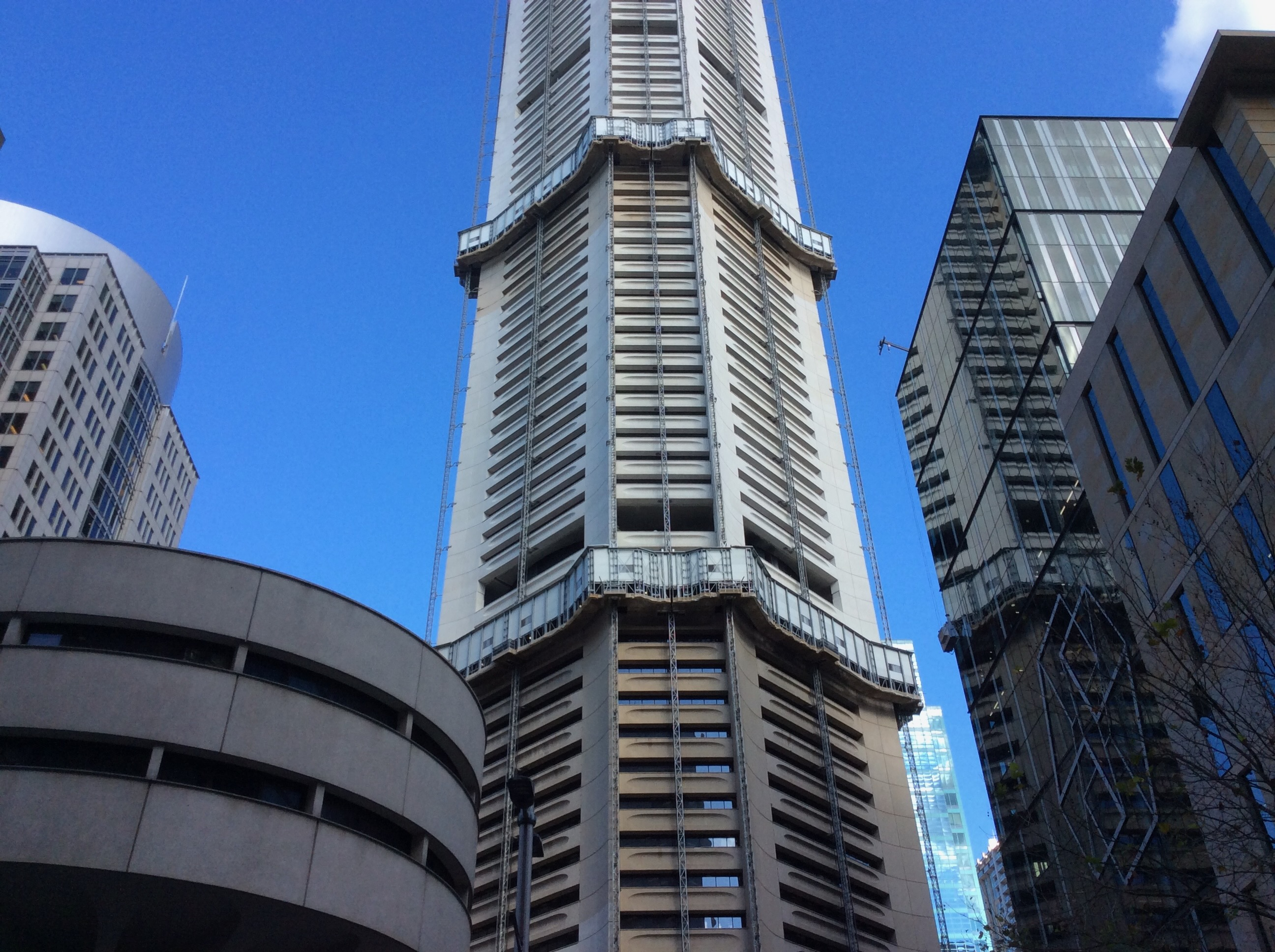
Work platforms for facade restoration project, 2015.

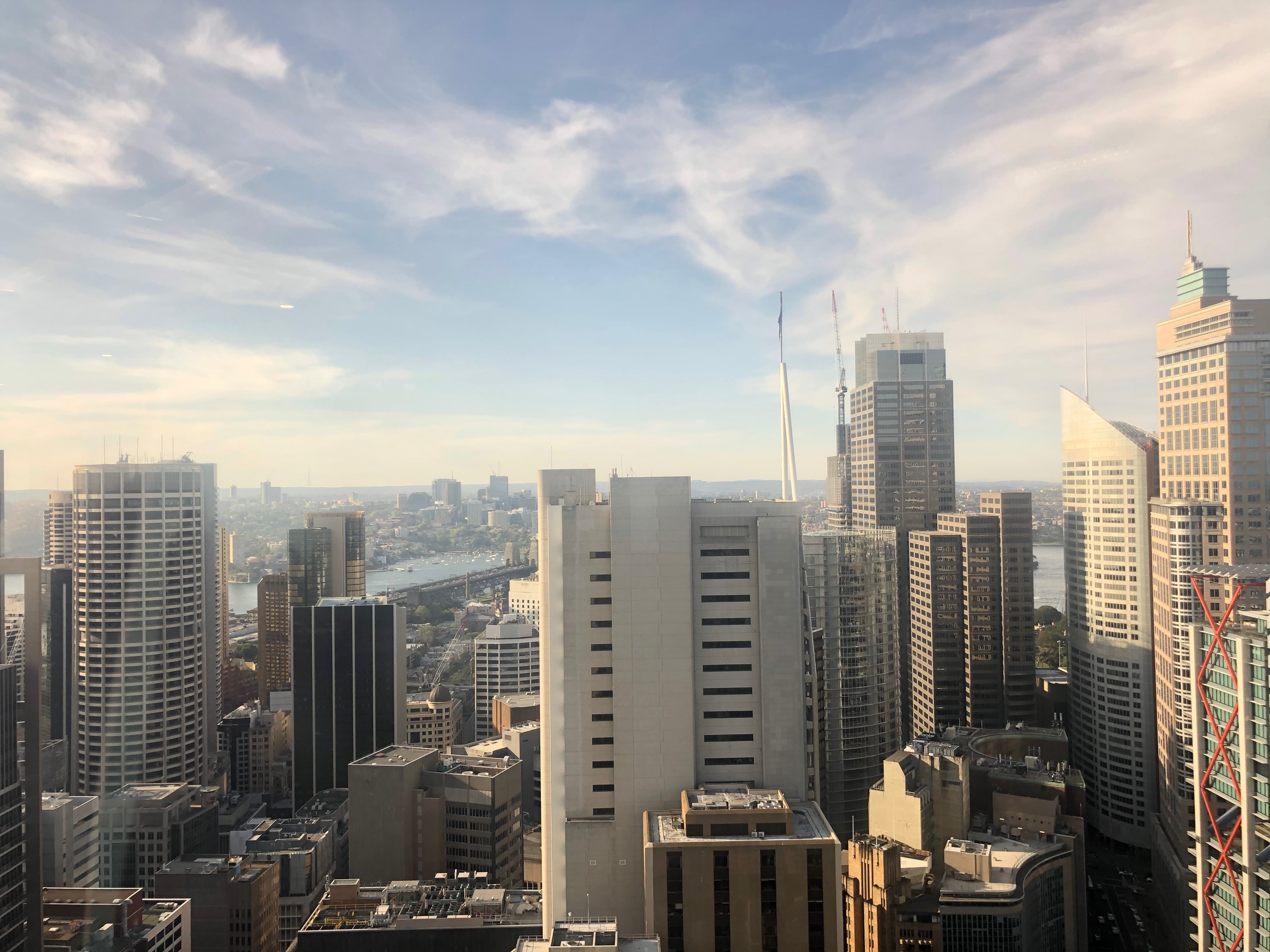
View north from Level 17, September 2019.

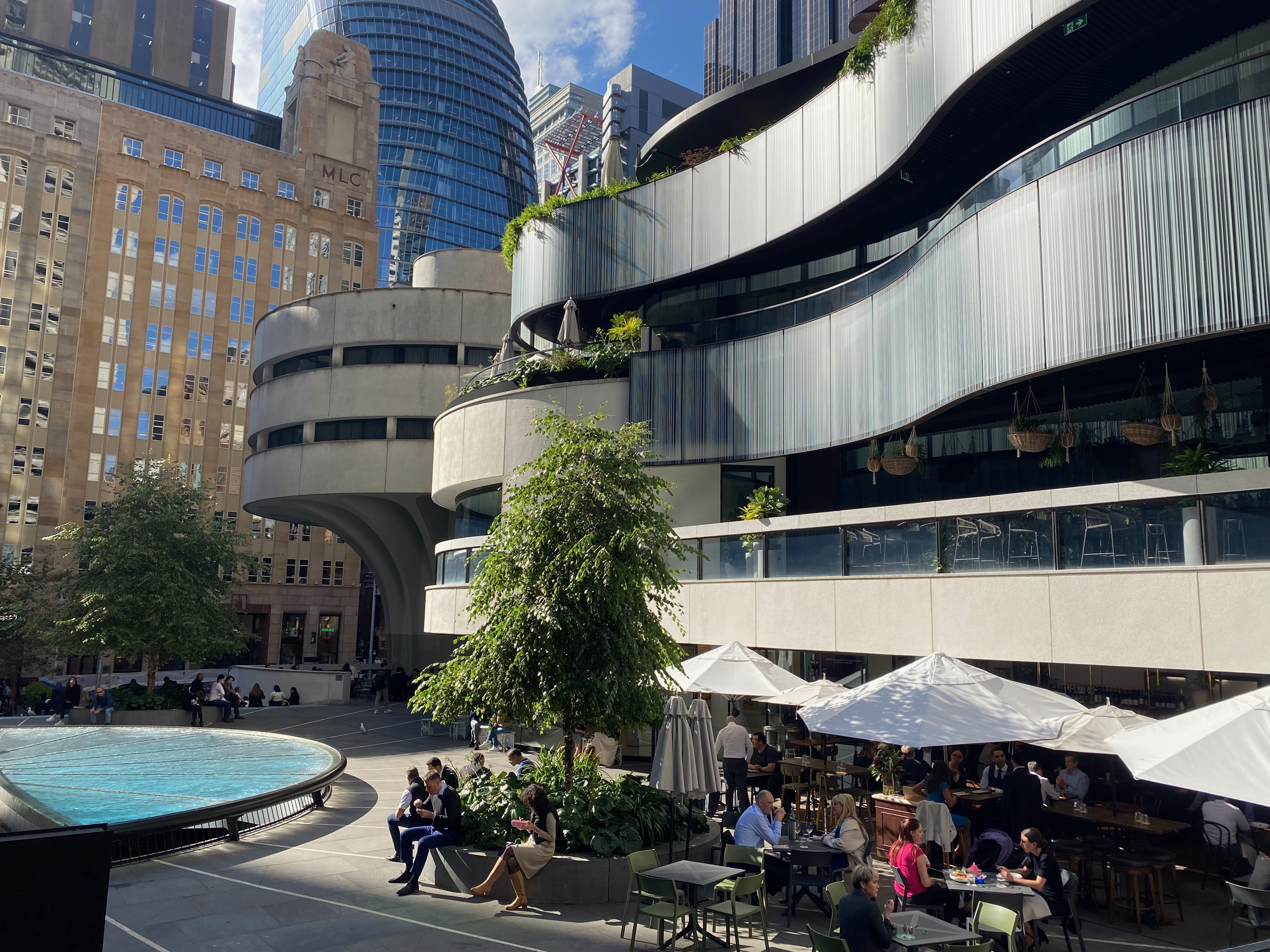
View north of eastern side of podium upgrade, 2024.

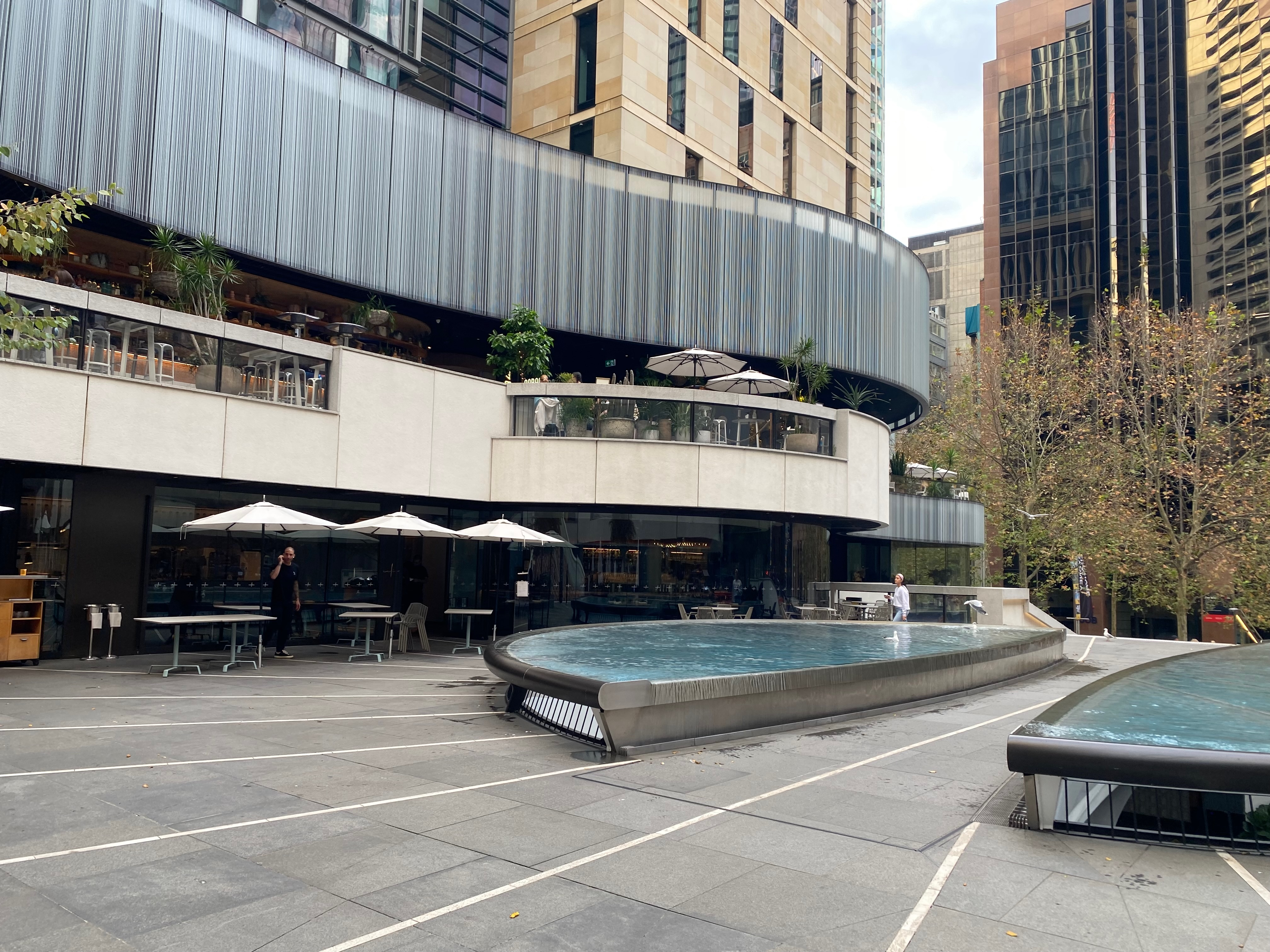
View north of western side of podium upgrade, 2024.

== See also ==
- List of tallest buildings in Sydney
- Architecture of Sydney
