= 101 Collins Street =

Skyscraper in Melbourne, Australia

101 Collins St
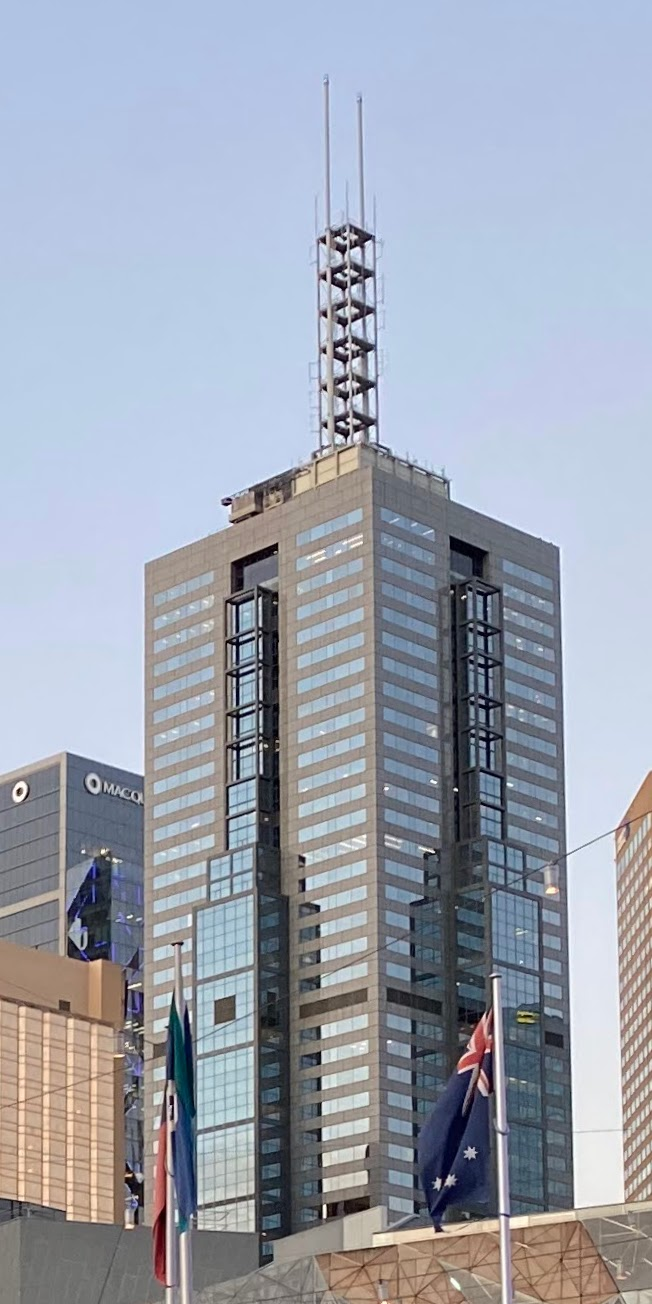

Record height
- Tallest in Melbourne from March 1991 to August 1991^{[I]}
- Preceded by: Rialto Towers
- Surpassed by: 120 Collins Street

General information
- Status: Completed
- Type: Office
- Location: Collins Street, Melbourne central business district, Victoria, Australia
- Coordinates: 37°48′54″S 144°58′14.8″E
- Completed: March 1991

Height
- Antenna spire: 260 m (850 ft)
- Roof: 195 m (640 ft)

Technical details
- Floor count: 57
- Floor area: 82,800 m^{2} (890,000 sq ft)

Design and construction
- Architect: Denton Corker Marshall

Website
- www.101collins.com.au

101 Collins Street is a 260 m (850 ft) skyscraper located in Collins Street, Melbourne central business district, Victoria, Australia. The 57-storey building designed by Denton Corker Marshall was completed in March 1991. Towards the end of project, with a change of developer, the foyer space was designed by John Burgee, noted as a pioneer of postmodern architecture.

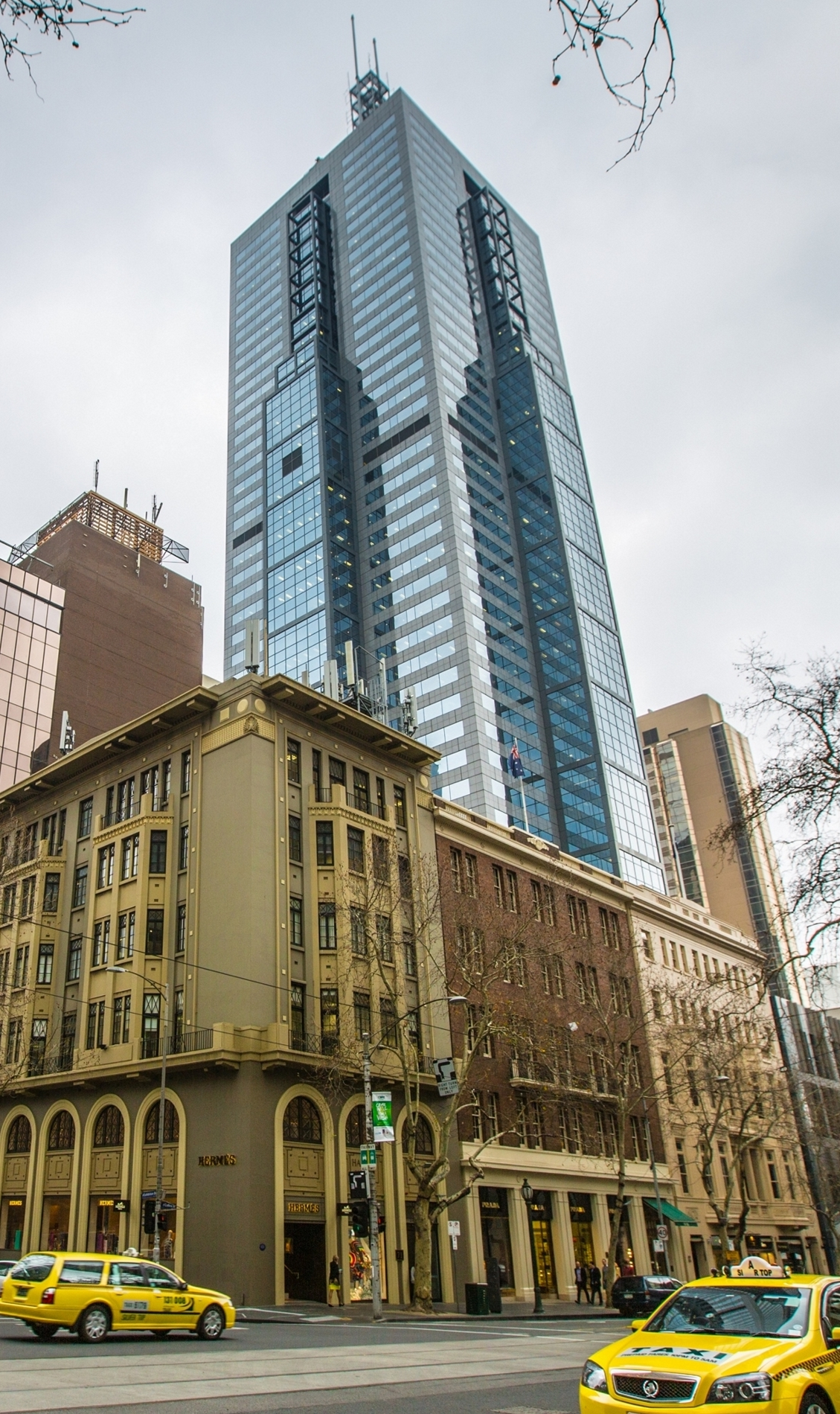
101 Collins Street tower, podium and the Collins Street streestcape.

It overtook Rialto Towers and became the tallest building in Melbourne and Australia until August 1991, when 120 Collins Street was completed. As of 2022, the tower is the sixth-tallest building in Melbourne and the 11th-tallest building in Australia when measured up to the tallest architectural point, which is the 60 m (200 ft)-tall spire.

The tower contains 83,000 m^{2} (890,000 sq ft) of rentable space. The floor-to-ceiling height is unusually large for a skyscraper at 2.77 m (9 ft 1 in). The 30 m (98 ft) lifts can reach speeds of 7 m/s (23 ft/s). There are 414 underground car park spaces. The building contains double glazed windows with surface coated tempered glass to increase thermal efficiency.

A large part of the site for 101 was created by demolishing the 26 floor CRA Building, the tallest in the city in the mid 1960s. It the first skyscraper to be demolished in the city.

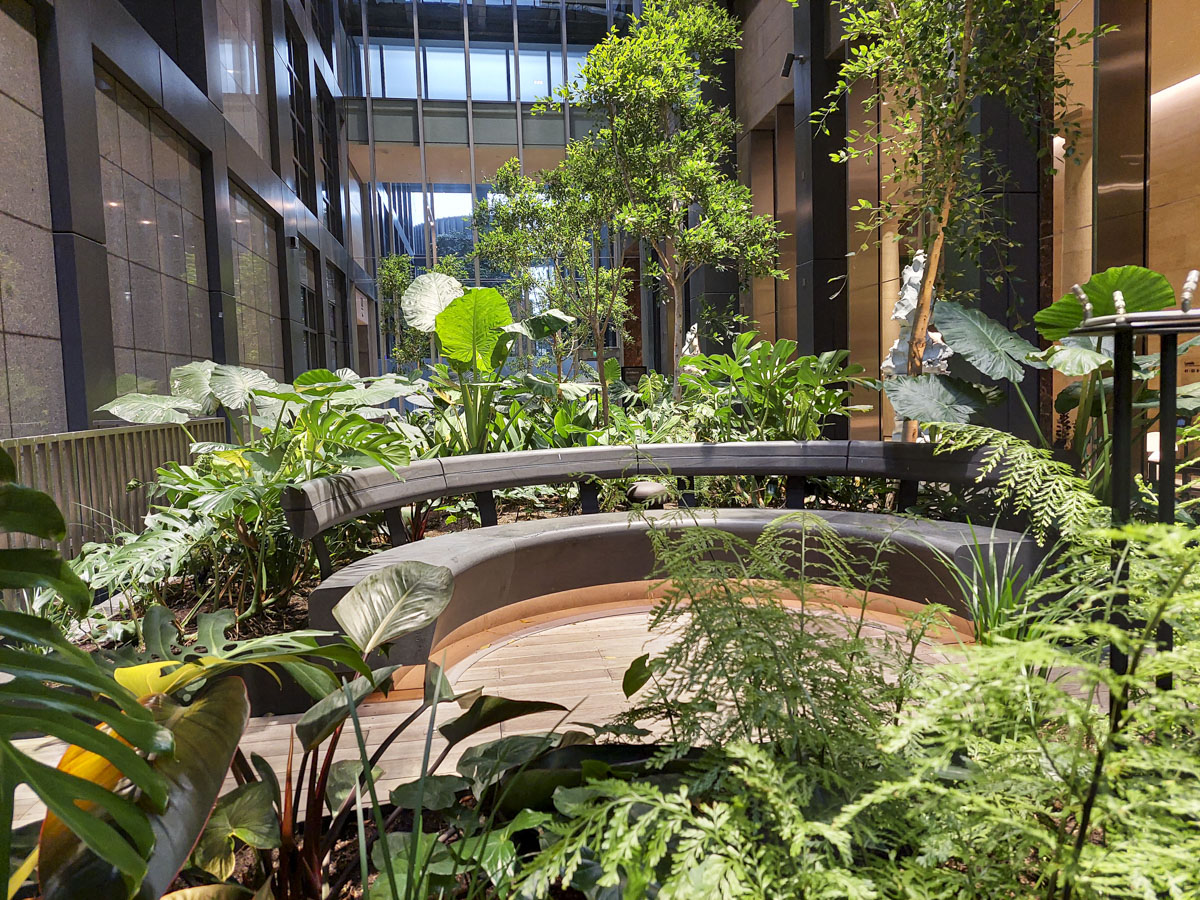
A lush sanctuary garden inside the building

The owners of 101 Collins have implemented a strategy of buying adjacent properties to safeguard the building's views, particularly towards the south. As a result, Flinders Lane has experienced an emergence of new restaurants and bars in older buildings.

101 Collins Street lends its name to a Yarra Trams stop that is served by routes 11, 12, 48 and 109.

== See also ==
- List of tallest buildings in Melbourne
- List of tallest buildings in Australia

Preceded by Rialto Towers	Tallest building in the Southern Hemisphere; March–August 1991	Succeeded by 120 Collins Street
