= Rialto Towers =

Skyscraper in Melbourne Australia

Rialto Complex
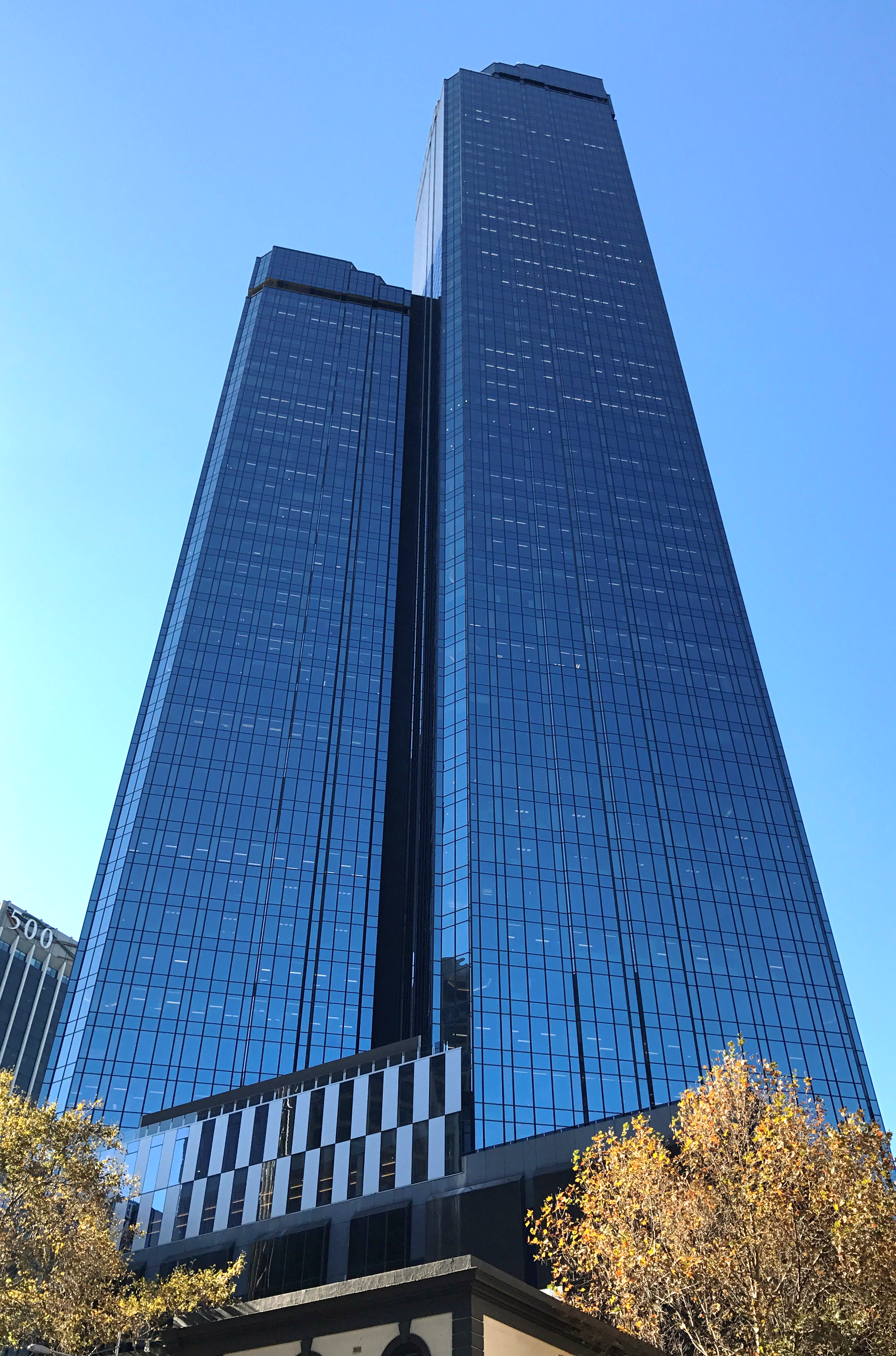
- Rialto Towers as viewed from base, May 2017

Record height
- Tallest in the Southern Hemisphere from 1986 to 1991^{[I]}
- Preceded by: 25 Martin Place
- Surpassed by: 101 Collins Street

General information
- Type: Office
- Location: Melbourne, Australia
- Coordinates: 37°49′08″S 144°57′30″E
- Construction started: 1982
- Completed: October 1986
- Cost: $220 Million AUD

Height
- Architectural: 251 m (823 ft)
- Roof: 247 m (810 ft)
- Observatory: 234 m (768 ft)

Technical details
- Floor count: 55 (plus 3 underground)
- Floor area: 84,000 m^{2} (904,200 sq ft)

Design and construction
- Architects: Gerard de Preu and Partners; Perrott Lyon Mathieson; William Pitt (1891); Charles Debro (1890); Richard Speight (1890)
- Structural engineer: W. K. Meinhardt & Partners (for Tower); Bonnaci Winward (for Hotel)
- Services engineer: Lincolne Scott Australia; C. R. Knight and Associates.
- Other designers: Dino Burranti; Richard Falkinger; Meldrum Burrows & Partners; Davenport Campbell & Partners
- Main contractor: Grollo Australia

Renovating team
- Architect: Woods Bagot (2010-2017)

Other information
- Parking: 500

Rialto Towers (also called The Rialto or Rialto) is a skyscraper complex at 525 Collins Street, on the western side of the Melbourne central business district, Victoria, Australia. It was the tallest office building in the Southern Hemisphere when built.

The Rialto featured Melbourne's first skyscraper public observation deck, which operated between 1994 and 31 December 2009. It was also the location of Melbourne's first Tower running event.

== Background ==
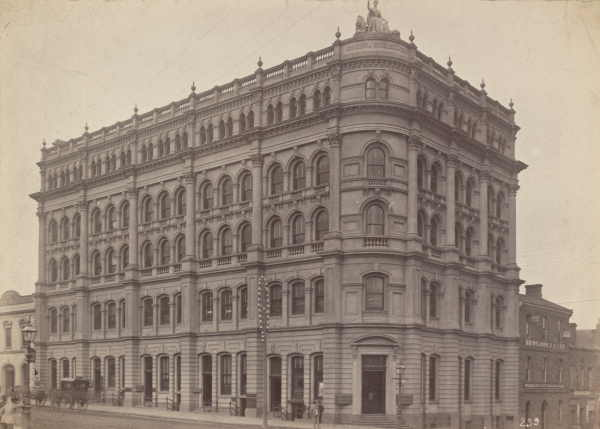
Robbs Building, demolished in 1982 to make way for an open forecourt on the corner

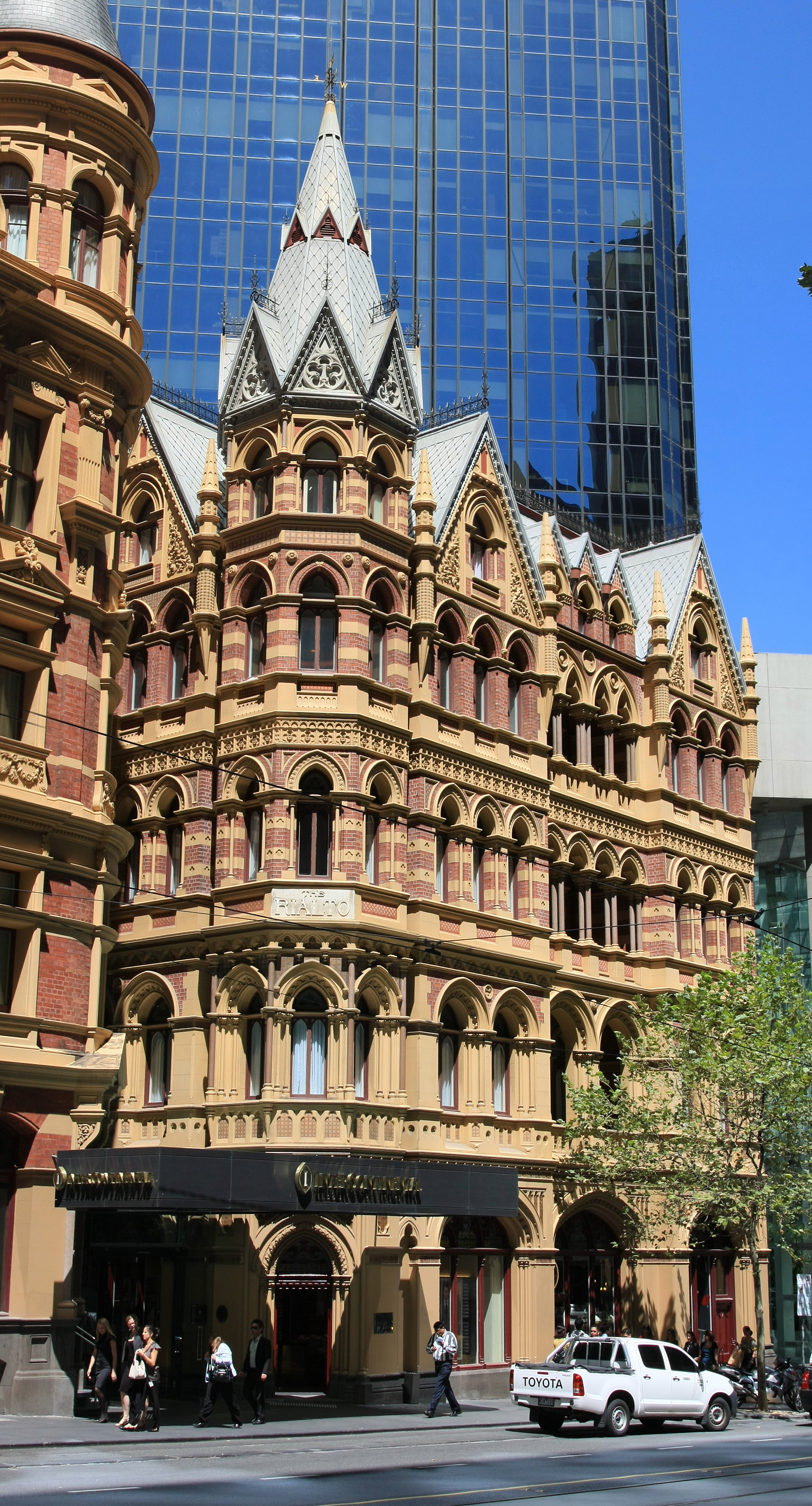
Original Rialto Building, retained as part of the development

The site of the whole Rialto development ran between Flinders Lane and Collins Street, and was occupied by several buildings including numerous small warehouses on Flinders Lane, with lanes between including and Winfield Square and Robbs Lane. On the corner of Collins and King Street stood Robb's Buildings, named for the owner, railway builder John Robb, a grand classical styled 5-storey Victorian office building designed by Thomas Watts and Sons in 1885, and one of the largest in the city at the time. Next to that along Collins Street stood two interwar buildings, then the Rialto Building (1891) designed by William Pitt and the Winfield Building (1890) designed by Charles Debro & Richard Speight, both part of the five building Rialto building group, an historic streetscape along Collins Street running up to the 1880s Olderfleet Building to the east.

Through the late 1960s and early 1970s, National Mutual Life Association of Australasia purchased the various historic buildings on the site, but had to rethink plans when the Rialto and Winfield buildings were listed by the new Historic Buildings Preservation Council in 1974, and the National Trust of Victoria opposed the demolition of other buildings on the site.

Little progress was made until 1980 when the site was acquired by Grollo Australia in a joint venture with St Martin's Properties. Grocon successfully argued that Robb's Building stood in the way of its major three-tower proposal, which they modified to a two-tower proposal, but still demolished the Robbs building. A hotel was created utilising the whole of the long rear wing of the Rialto Building, the replacement of the rear wing of the Winfield Building, and the creation of an atrium between.

== Construction ==
The final development plan involved several separate projects proceeding concurrently: the 242m office tower; a five-level underground car park; the restoration of the historic Rialto and Winfield building to create an international hotel; and a theatrette. Ancillary works included the Collins Street Plaza, restoration of the York Butter Factory and Robbs Annexe, and new shops.

Designed by architects Gerard de Preu and Partners in association with Perrott Lyon Mathieson, the building was built between 1982 and 1986, opening in October 1986. The massive glass curtain wall façade of reinforced blue tinted mirrored glass is its central feature and changes colour during the day, ranging from a trademark dark blue to a brilliant gold during sunset.

Consultants for the design were Dino Burranti, Richard Falkinger (restoration of Rialto and Winfield buildings), Meldrum Burrows and Partners (York Butter Factory) and Davenport Campbell and Partners (hotel interior). Lincolne Scott Australia provided the mechanical, electrical, and fire services as well as the elevators. The hydraulic engineers were C. R. Knight and Associates.

Project planning was undertaken by Project Planning and Management Pty Ltd and the quantity surveying/cost consultants were Rider Hunt and Partners. The structural engineers for the project were W. K. Meinhardt and Partners (for Tower) and Bonnaci Winward (for Hotel).

It is 251 m (823 ft) high, with 55 floors and 3 basement floors. It comprises two conjoined towers, the shorter North Tower being 185 m (607 ft) high with 43 floors. In total, there are 84,000 m^{2} (900,000 sq ft) of office space. Early tenants moved into the lower floors while the upper floors were still under construction in 1984.

== Rialto Run-up ==
Inspired by the popular Empire State Building Run-Up, a stair race up the 242 m (794 ft), 1222–1254 step race to the 53rd floor of the Rialto building was first run in the late 1980s and became an annual event with both men's and women's divisions known as the Rialto Run-up. Previous winners include Robin Rishworth (1989, 1990); Geoff Case (1991). The winner was awarded with a trip to New York City to compete in the Empire State Building race. The event was run until 2005 and competitors had to go up 1254 steps.

== Observation Deck ==
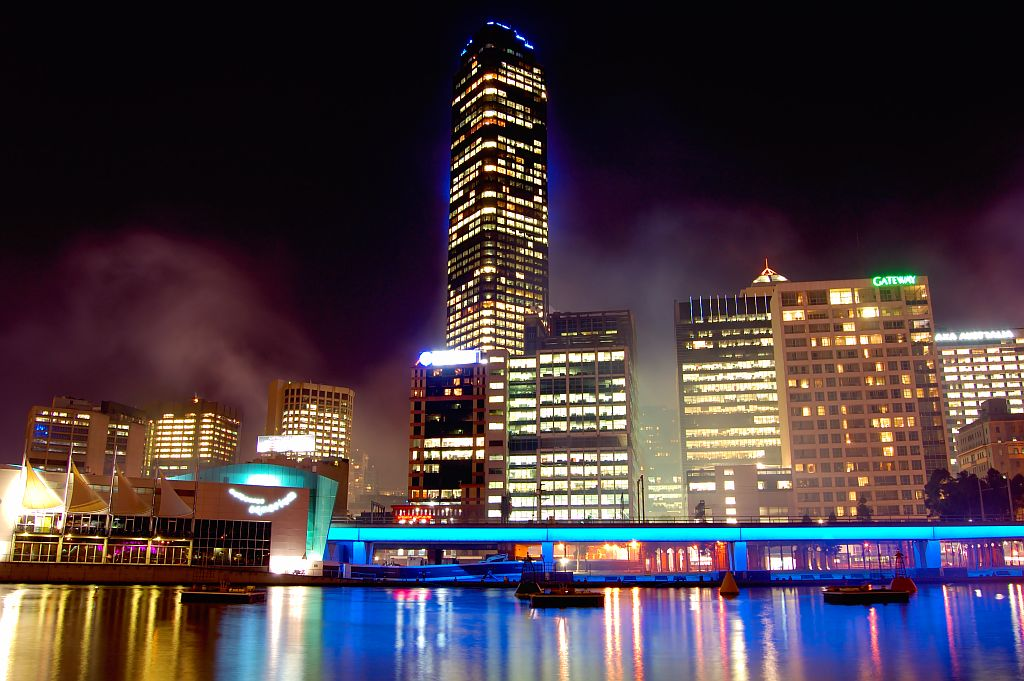
Rialto at night.

The Melbourne Observation Deck opened to the public on 19 July 1994 and was located on the 55th floor of the South Tower, at 234 m (768 ft). Views of up to 60 km (37 mi) can be had on a clear day. The floor is serviced by two passenger lifts. On 31 December 2009, the observation deck closed. In 2010, the fine dining restaurant, Vue de Monde, and associated cocktail bar, Lui Bar, opened for trade on Level 55.

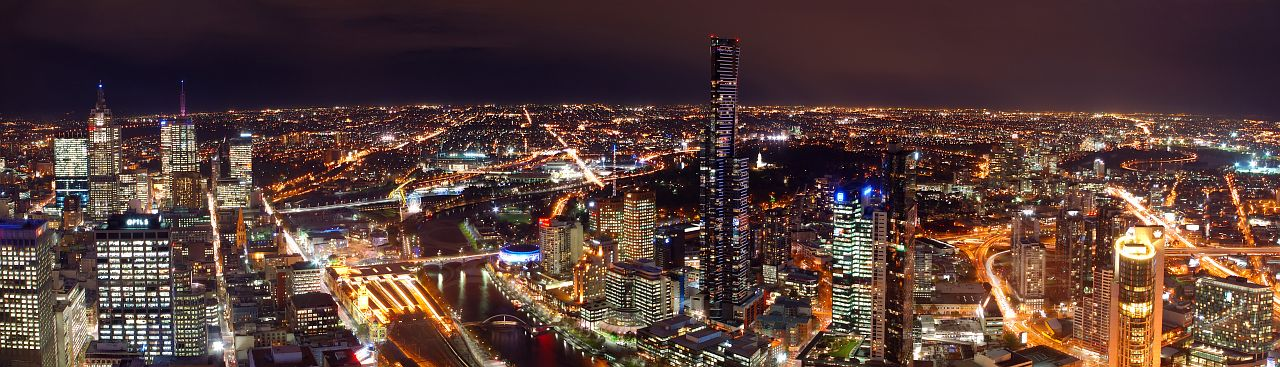
Panoramic view from the Rialto at night showing the Melbourne city centre and Southbank illuminated

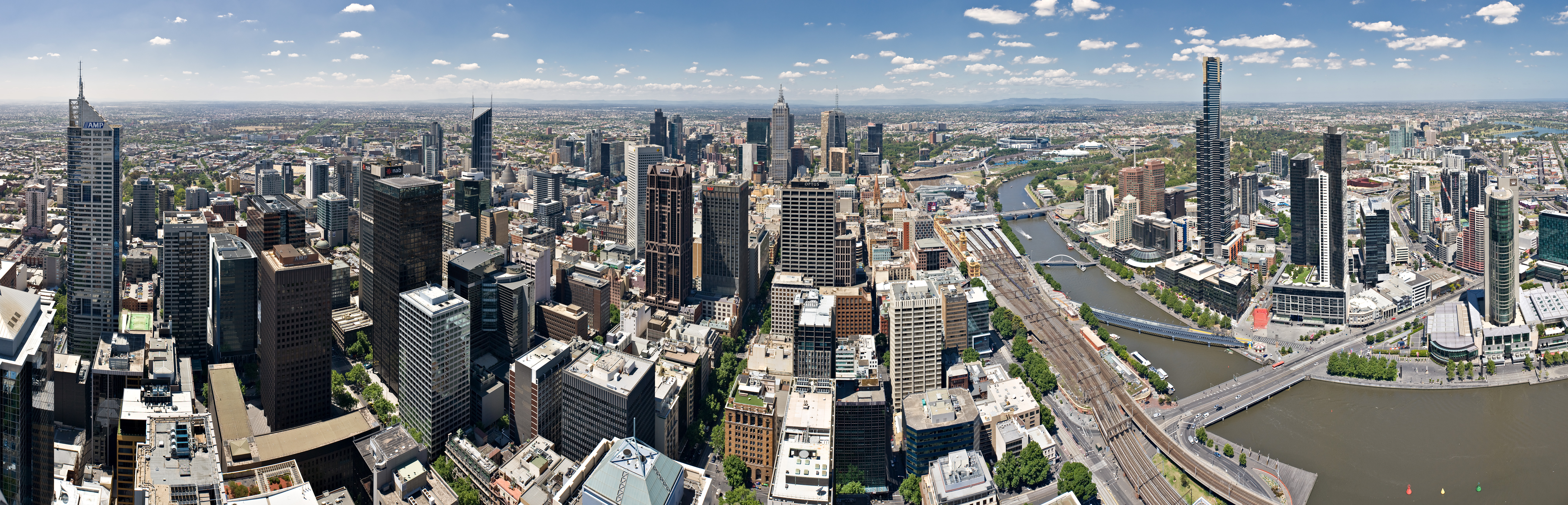
A ~180-degree panoramic image of Melbourne's Hoddle Grid (CBD) and Southbank on the right side, as viewed from the Rialto Observation Deck

== New podium ==
In 2015–17, the partly roofed, partly open forecourt-podium was replaced with a 5 level perimeter building containing offices, with retail at ground level, and an internal glass-roofed area between it, the towers, and the side wall of the original Victorian era Rialto building. This addition was designed by Woods Bagot architects.

== Statistics ==
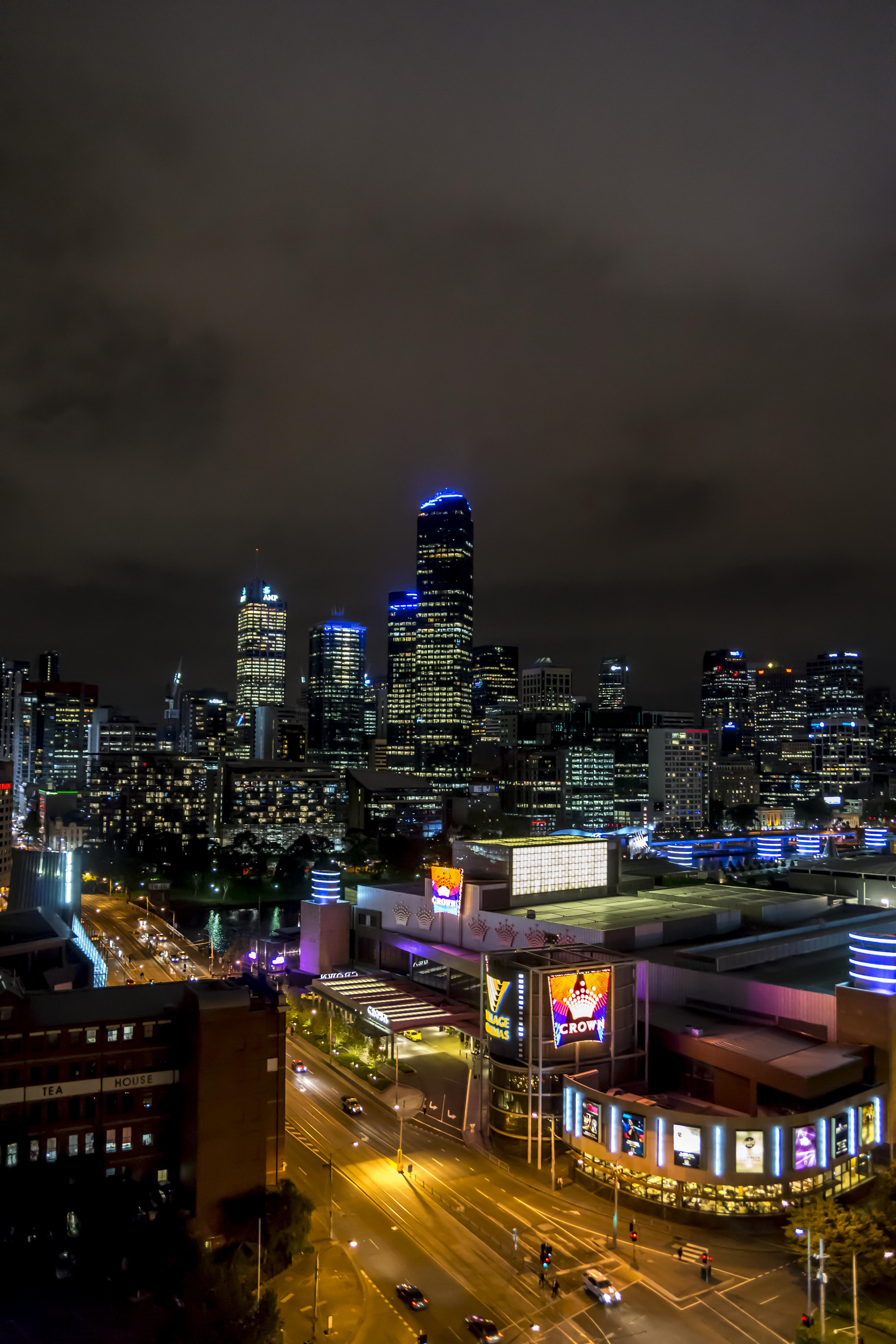
Rialto dominating Melbourne's western skyline

Rialto consists of two interconnected towers, North and South, with rooftop floors at Level 41 and Level 58 respectively. There are 36 passenger lifts, 95 km (59 mi) of lift cables, 706 lift door openings and 1,450 staircase steps. The outer surface of the building has 13,000 windows. There are five basement levels of car park available for occupiers and casual users. When completed in 1986, The Rialto surpassed Sydney's MLC Centre to become Australia's tallest building at 251 m (823 ft). It was the tallest for five years until being surpassed by 101 Collins Street in 1991. As of 2026, it is the 9th-tallest building in Melbourne and 17th-tallest building in Australia.

== Gallery ==
August 2007

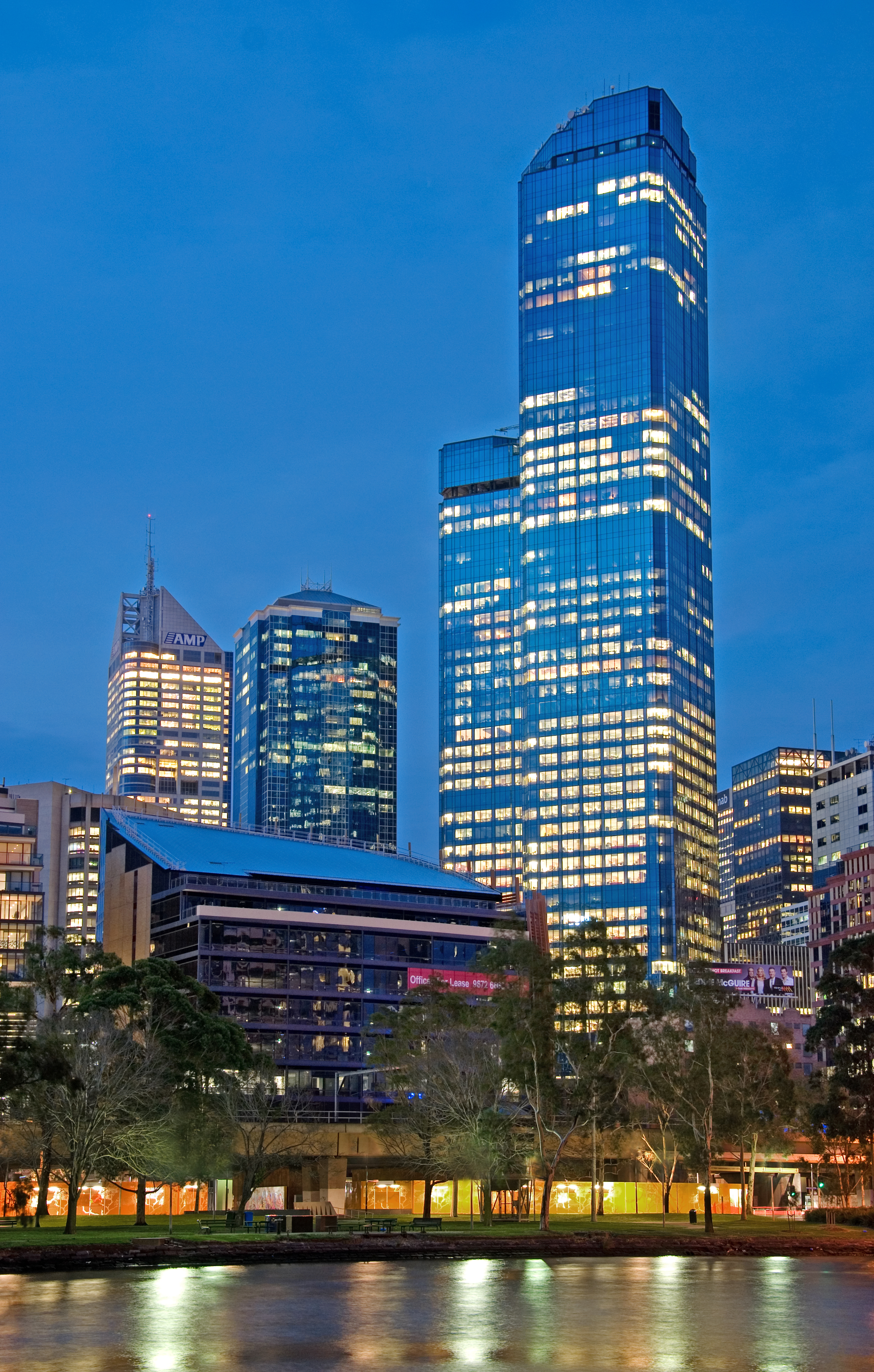
March 2010

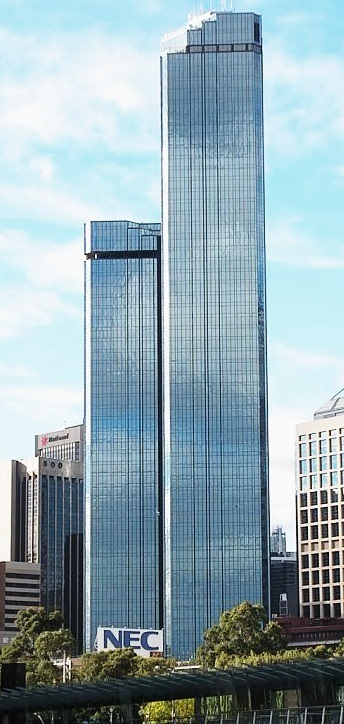
August 2015

== See also ==
- Architecture of Melbourne

Records
Preceded by 25 Martin Place	Tallest building in the Southern Hemisphere; 251 feet (77 m); 1986–1991	Succeeded by 101 Collins Street
Preceded by 25 Martin Place	Tallest building in Australia; 251 feet (77 m); 1986–1991	Succeeded by 101 Collins Street
Preceded by 35 Collins Street	Tallest building in Melbourne; 251 feet (77 m); 1986–1991	Succeeded by 101 Collins Street
