= 120 Collins Street =

Skyscraper in Collins Street, Melbourne central business district, Victoria

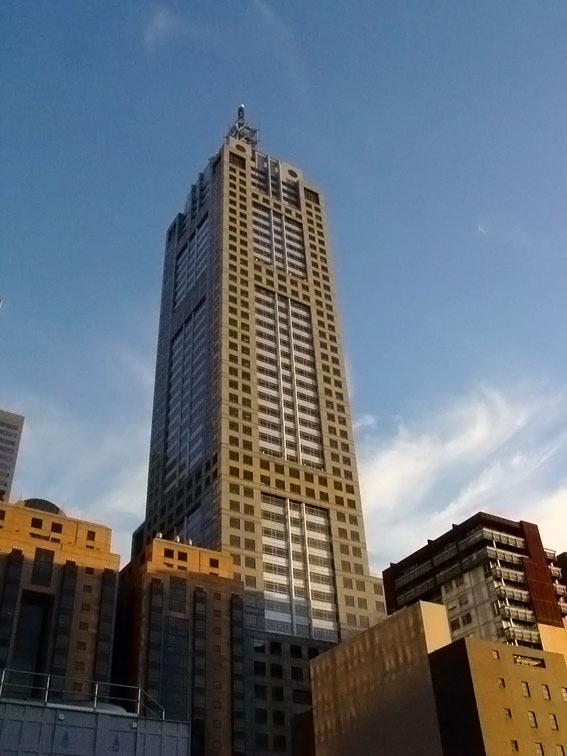
- 120 Collins Street Tower in September 2005
- Interactive map of the 120 Collins Street area

Record height
- Tallest in Melbourne from August 1991 to 2006^{[I]}
- Preceded by: 101 Collins Street
- Surpassed by: Eureka Tower

General information
- Status: Completed
- Type: Office
- Location: Collins Street, Melbourne, Victoria, Australia
- Coordinates: 37°48′49.8″S 144°58′10.2″E
- Construction started: 1989
- Completed: 1991
- Owner: Investa Property Group

Height
- Antenna spire: 265 m (869 ft)
- Roof: 222 m (728 ft)

Technical details
- Floor count: 52
- Floor area: 65,000 m^{2} (700,000 sq ft)

Design and construction
- Architects: Hassell; Daryl Jackson
- Structural engineer: Connell Wagner
- Main contractor: Grocon

120 Collins Street is a 265-metre-tall (869 ft) skyscraper on Collins Street, Melbourne central business district, Victoria, Australia. It was built from 1989 to 1991 and it comprises 50 levels of office accommodation and four levels of plant.

The building was designed by architectural firm Hassell, in association with Daryl Jackson. Structural engineers were Connell Wagner, and mechanical, electrical and fire services engineers were Lincolne Scott.

120 Collins Street is a postmodern style building, paying homage to New York City's grand Art Deco buildings, such as the Empire State Building and the Chrysler Building. This influence can be seen in the building's granite façade, its setbacks and its central mast.

The building is home to a number of high-profile tenants including BofA Securities, Bain Capital, BlackRock, Rothschild & Co, Knight Frank, Qualitas, Standard & Poor's, BlueScope, Corrs Chambers Westgarth, Urbis, Mitsubishi, Rio Tinto, Ord Minnett, System Partners, Morgan Stanley, Citigroup and Korn Ferry.

When completed in August 1991, the building had a roof height of 220 metres (720 ft) with a 45-metre (148 ft) spire, bringing the total height to 265 metres (869 ft). It was the tallest building in Australia for 14 years until it was surpassed by the Q1 in 2005. It remained the tallest building in Melbourne until being surpassed by the residential Eureka Tower in 2006. As of 2022, it is the fifth-tallest building in Melbourne and the eighth-tallest building in Australia.

Preceded by 101 Collins Street	Tallest building in the Southern Hemisphere; 1991–2005	Succeeded by Q1
