= Golden Triangle of Jakarta =

Central business district in Indonesia

The Golden Triangle of Jakarta (Indonesian: Segitiga Emas Jakarta), also referred to as the Medan Merdeka–Thamrin–Sudirman Axis (Indonesian: Poros Medan Merdeka–Thamrin–Sudirman) or the Sudirman–Thamrin–Kuningan Axis (Indonesian: Poros Sudirman–Thamrin–Kuningan) and Jakarta CBD, is a roughly triangular area in the center of Jakarta, Indonesia, extending from Central Jakarta to South Jakarta. Most of the city's tallest skyscrapers, office buildings and foreign embassies are located in the area. It is the main CBD of Jakarta.

The area is bordered by Jalan M.H. Thamrin-Jalan Jenderal Sudirman (north-southwest), Jalan H.R. Rasuna Said (north-southeast), and Jalan Jenderal Gatot Subroto (east-west). There are many other roads bisecting the area. The Golden Triangle's commercial areas include SCBD (45 hectares), Mega Kuningan (54 hectares), Rasuna Epicentrum (53.6 hectares) and Kuningan Persada (17 hectares). The Golden Triangle is one of the fastest-evolving CBDs in the Asia-Pacific region.

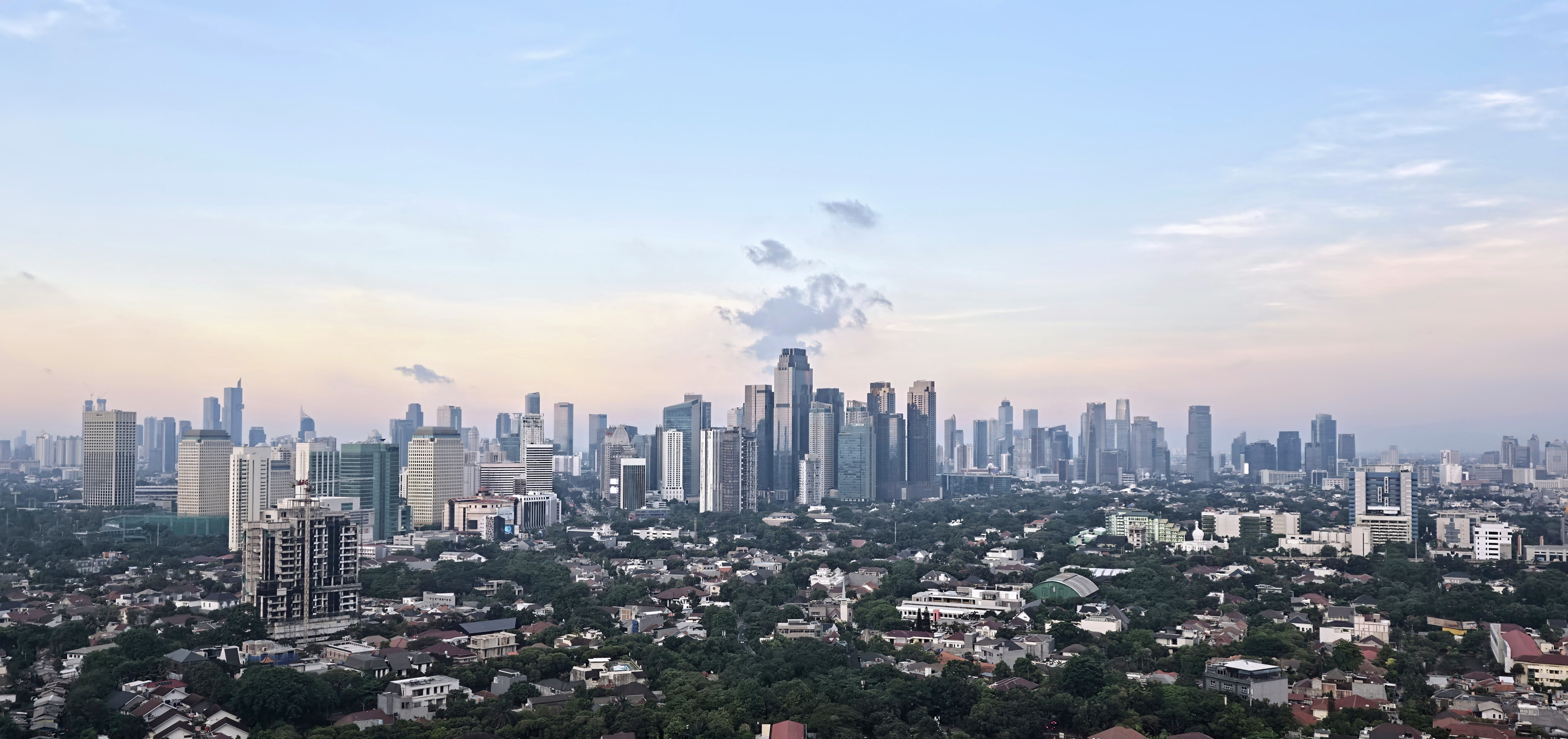
Panoramic view of skyscrapers in the Golden Triangle of Jakarta

== History and geography ==
1 Youth statue
2 Arjuna statue
3 Dirgantara Monument

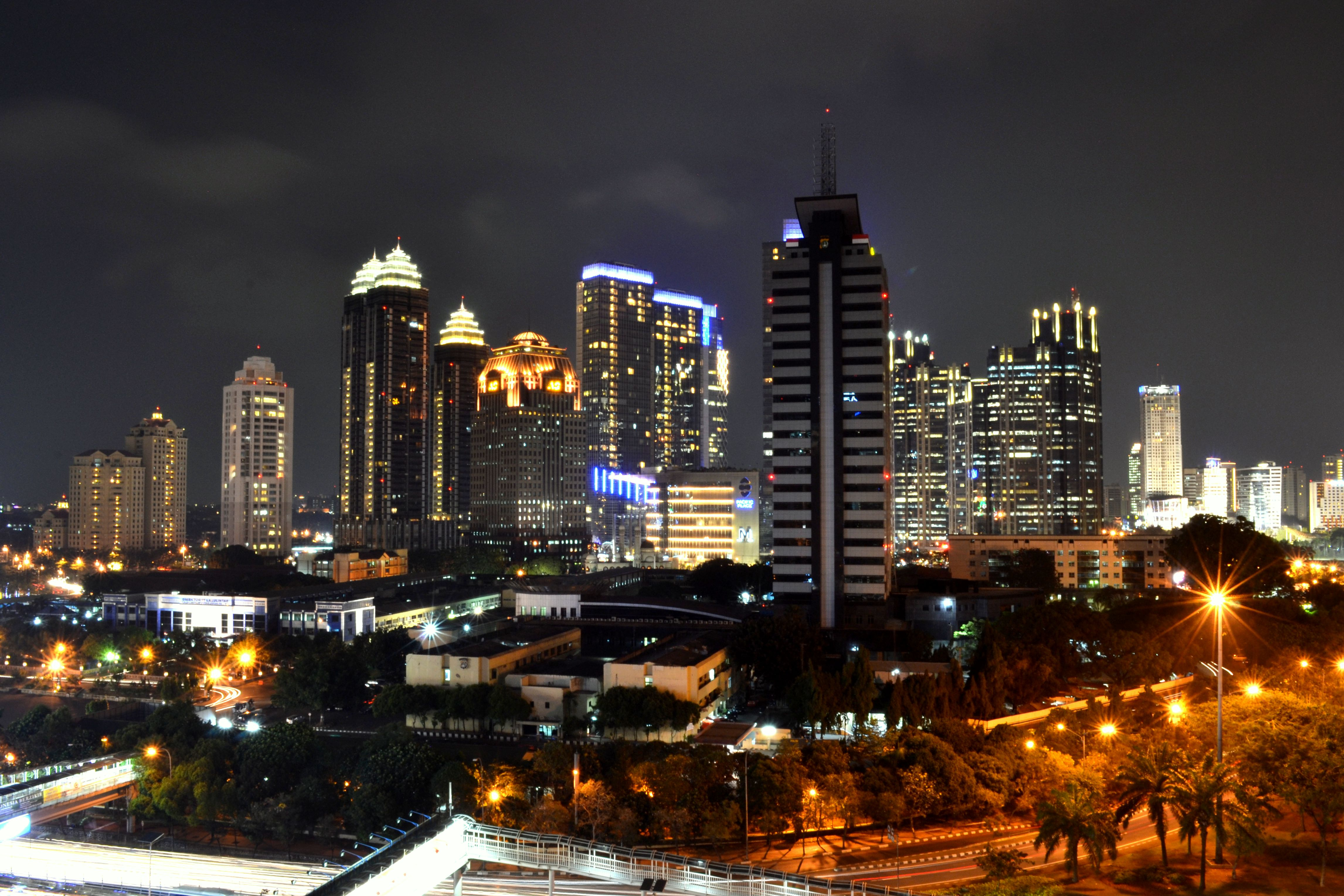
Night scenery of the Sudirman Central Business District

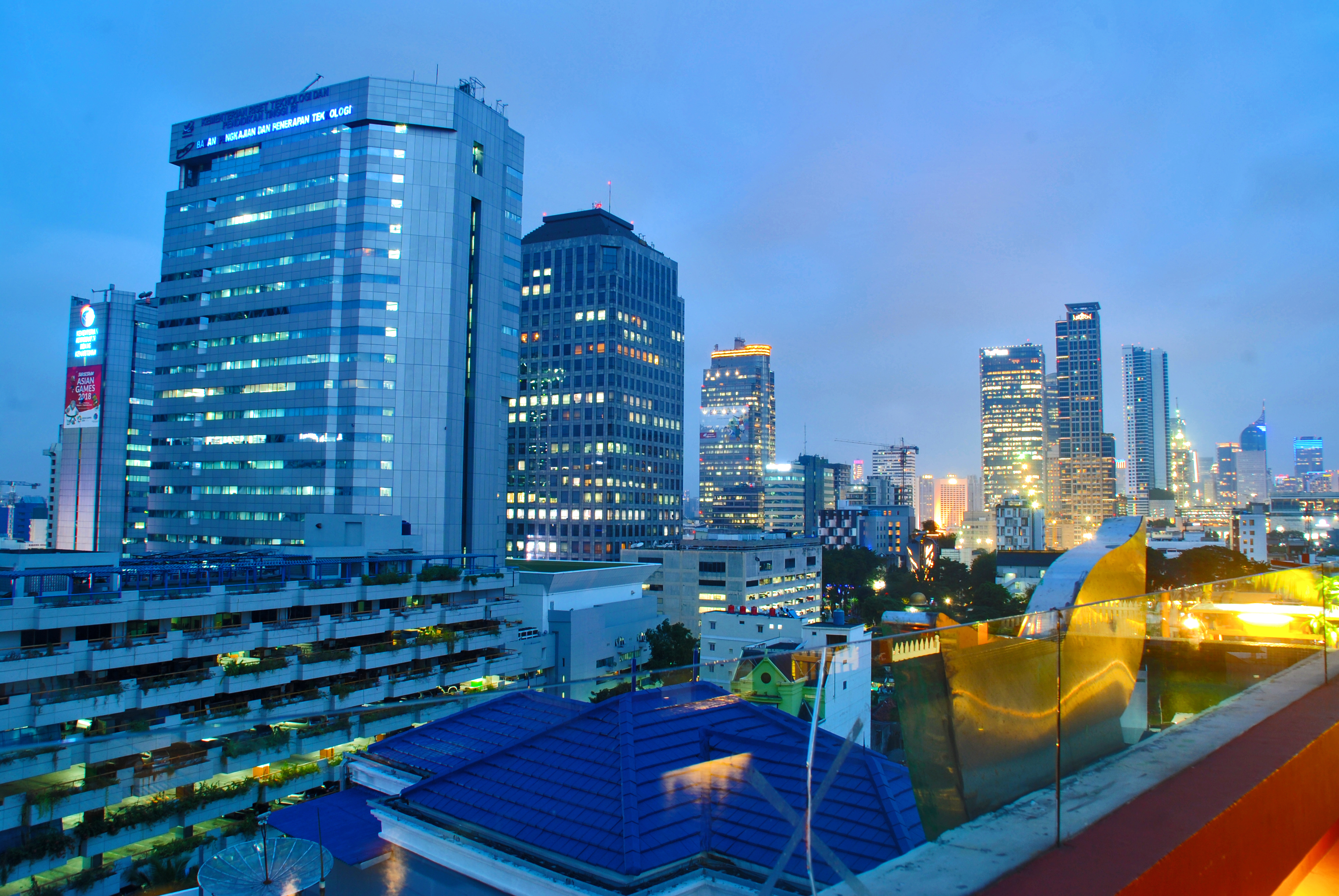
Buildings around Jalan Thamrin

From 1960-1965, Jakarta's urban development changed drastically when President Sukarno, also an architect and an urban planner, redeveloped the city into a modern capital that would not only be the pride of the Indonesian nation but also be a "beacon" of a powerful new nation. During the 1950s, the development axis of Jakarta was shifted southward from Medan Merdeka to Kebayoran as the center of Jakarta, replacing the axis of Medan Merdeka-Senen-Salemba-Jatinegara, which had grown since the 18th century.

Some of Sukarno's notable infrastructure projects during the first half of the 1960s were the construction of wide avenues, such as Jalan Thamrin, Jalan Sudirman, Jalan Gatot Subroto, and the Semanggi "clover-leaf" interchange. Jalan Rasuna Said was developed in the 1970s; together with Jalan Sudirman and Jalan Gatot Subroto, they formed the Golden Triangle. During the period, construction commenced north of the Semanggi Interchange on Jalan Sudirman.

The term "the Golden Triangle" for the Jakarta CBD was popularized in the 1990s. Three points of the triangle which form the area are:

- Youth statue in Kebayoran Baru, South Jakarta
- Arjuna statue in Merdeka Square, Central Jakarta
- Dirgantara Monument in Pancoran, South Jakarta

The Golden Triangle area of Jakarta includes major roads such as Thamrin, Sudirman, Gatot Subroto, Rasuna Said, Mas Mansyur, and Satrio. Administratively, it is located in Menteng, Tanah Abang, Setiabudi, Kebayoran Baru, a small part of Tebet, Pancoran, and Mampang Prapatan sub-districts of Jakarta.

== Important areas in the Golden Triangle ==
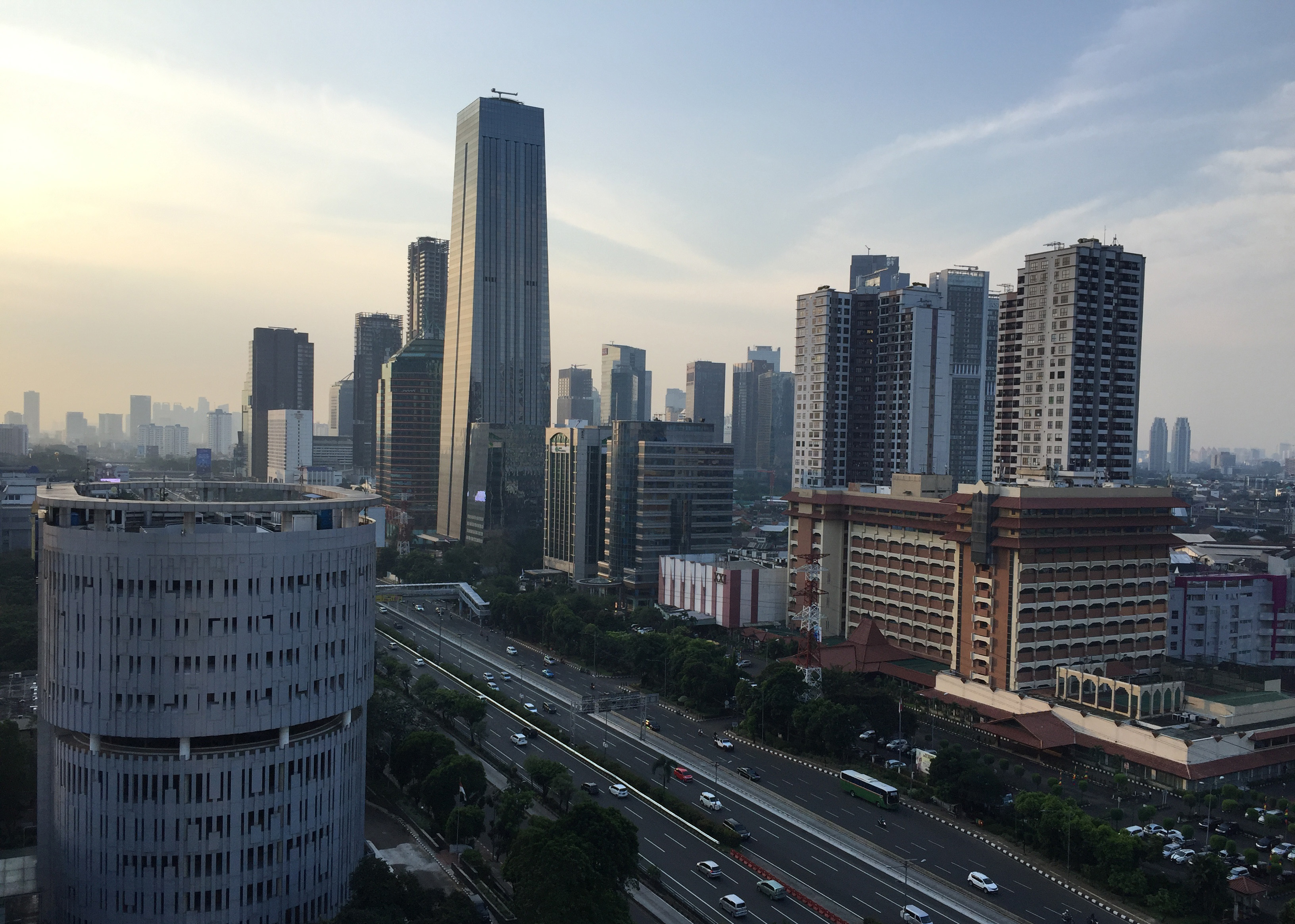
Jalan Jenderal Gatot Subroto, which runs east-west of the Golden Triangle

Many commercial centers have been gradually developed as clusters within the Golden Triangle area, such as the Hotel Indonesia roundabout, SCBD, and Mega Kuningan. Most of Jakarta's skyscrapers are located within this triangle.

- Many commercial areas, shopping centers, and hotels are located in and around the Hotel Indonesia roundabout, such as Grand Indonesia, Plaza Indonesia, Thamrin Nine, Hotel Indonesia, Wisma Nusantara, the tallest building in Jakarta, Autograph Tower, and Menara BCA. The embassies of Japan, Germany, and France are situated on Jalan M.H. Thamrin, close to the roundabout. Bank Indonesia's headquarters and the first high-rise building of Jakarta, Sarinah, are also located at Jalan M.H. Thamrin.
- Jalan Jenderal Sudirman has numerous high-rise buildings and skyscrapers, such as Wisma 46, Menara Astra, Sinarmas MSIG Tower, International Financial Center Jakarta, World Trade Center Jakarta, and Sahid Sudirman Center.
- SCBD is a mixed-development cluster of 45 hectares located at Jalan Jenderal Sudirman. The area has many commercial skyscrapers, shopping and entertainment centers. District 8, Pacific Place Jakarta, Indonesia Stock Exchange, The Energy, PCPD Tower, Sequis Center Tower, and Equity Tower are within the district. As of June 2017, the 2nd tallest building in Indonesia, Treasury Tower, is located in the district at present. Jakarta Signature Tower, also located in the district, is under construction and will be the tallest building in the city and the 5th tallest building in the world once completed.
- The DPR/MPR Building, housing the legislative branch of the Indonesian government, is located between Jalan Jenderal Sudirman and Jalan Jenderal Gatot Subroto. Gelora Bung Karno Sports Complex, JCC, Plaza Senayan, Senayan City, FX Sudirman, and the headquarters of the Jakarta Metropolitan Police are located in and around the Senayan area of Golden Triangle.
- The embassies of Australia, Malaysia, Singapore, Russia, Poland, Netherlands, Switzerland, Hungary, Bosnia and Herzegovina, Turkey, Algeria, Bangladesh, and India are located on Jalan H.R. Rasuna Said.
- Mega Kuningan is a densely concentrated district of high-rise buildings with a land area of about 55 hectares (140 acres). Important buildings in the area are the World Capital Tower, BTPN Towers, JW Marriott Jakarta, Ritz-Carlton Hotel, Ciputra World Jakarta complex, etc.
- Rasuna Epicentrum is an area of 53.6 hectares (132 acres), consisting of residential, offices, hotels, hospitals, places of worship, sports, shopping, entertainment and education in one area.
- Jalan Jenderal Gatot Subroto runs east-west within the Golden Triangle. It is now undergoing a transformation by building new skyscrapers. Four Seasons Hotel Tower, Telkom Landmark Complex, The Tower, and Mangkuluhur City are located on this road.

== Monuments ==
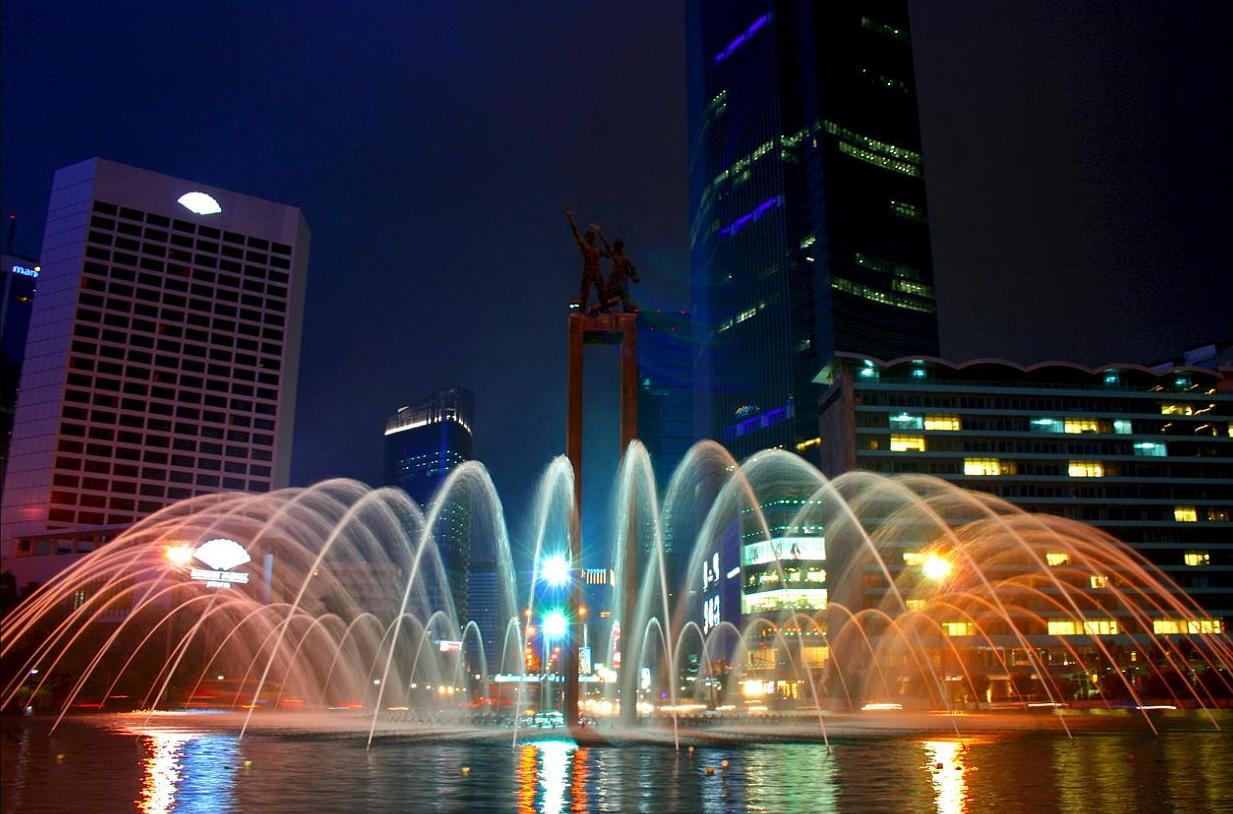
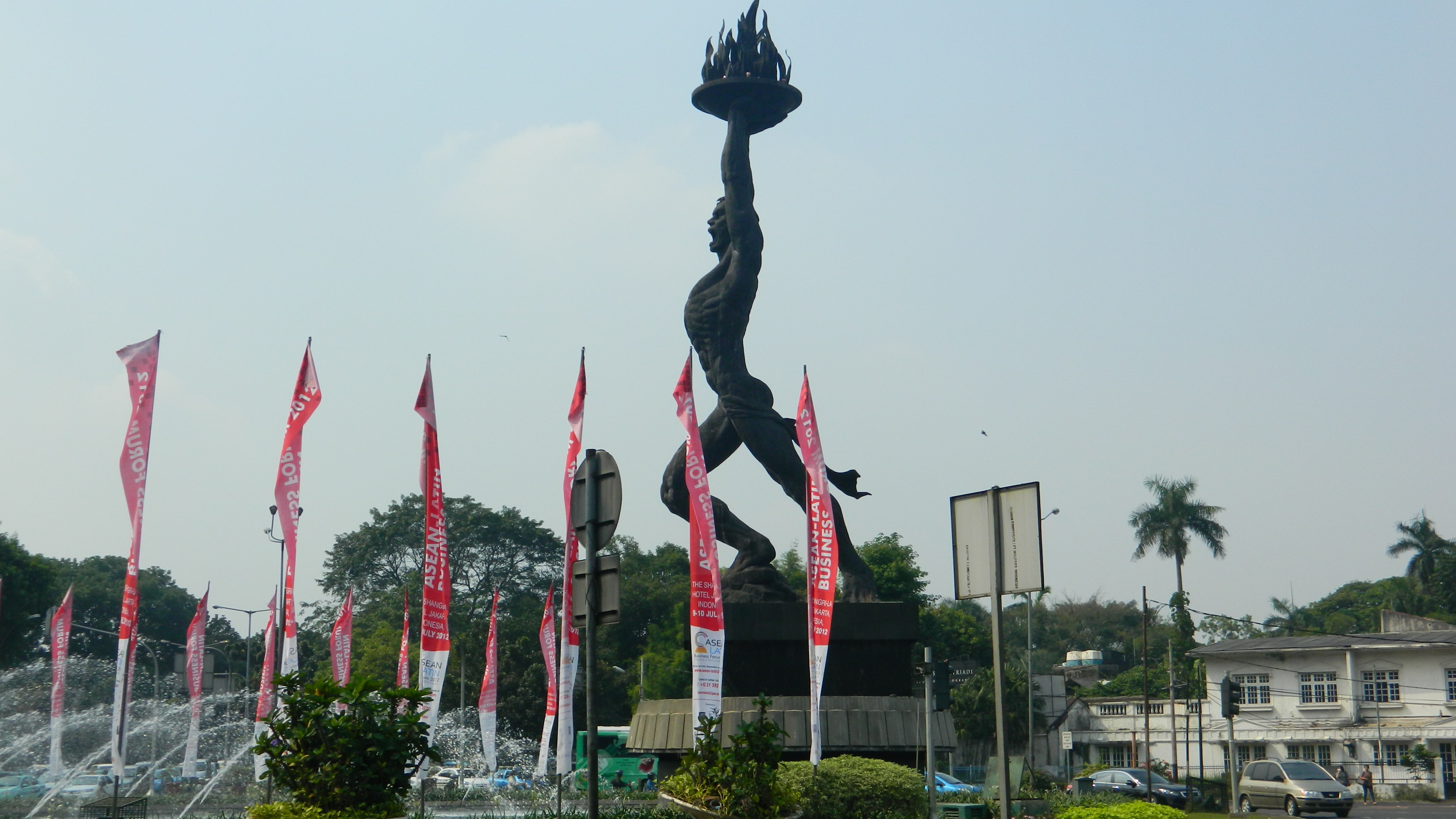
Various monuments in the Golden Triangle area. From above to below: The National Monument (Monas) as the main symbol and icon of Jakarta and Indonesia, the Arjuna Wijaya Chariot Statue near the Bank Indonesia headquarters, the Selamat Datang Monument, the Youth Monument, and the West Irian Liberation Monument on the northeast of the Monas

There are lots of monuments in the Golden Triangle area. One is the National Monument (Monas), the main symbol and icon of Jakarta and Indonesia. Other monuments, such as the Statue of Arjuna Wijaya near the Bank Indonesia head office, the Statue of Mohammad Hoesni Thamrin at the front of the Bank Indonesia Roundabout, the Selamat Datang Monument at the Hotel Indonesia Roundabout at the front of the Grand Indonesia Shopping Town, Statue of General Sudirman, Youth Monument, and the Dirgantara Monument.

== Streets ==
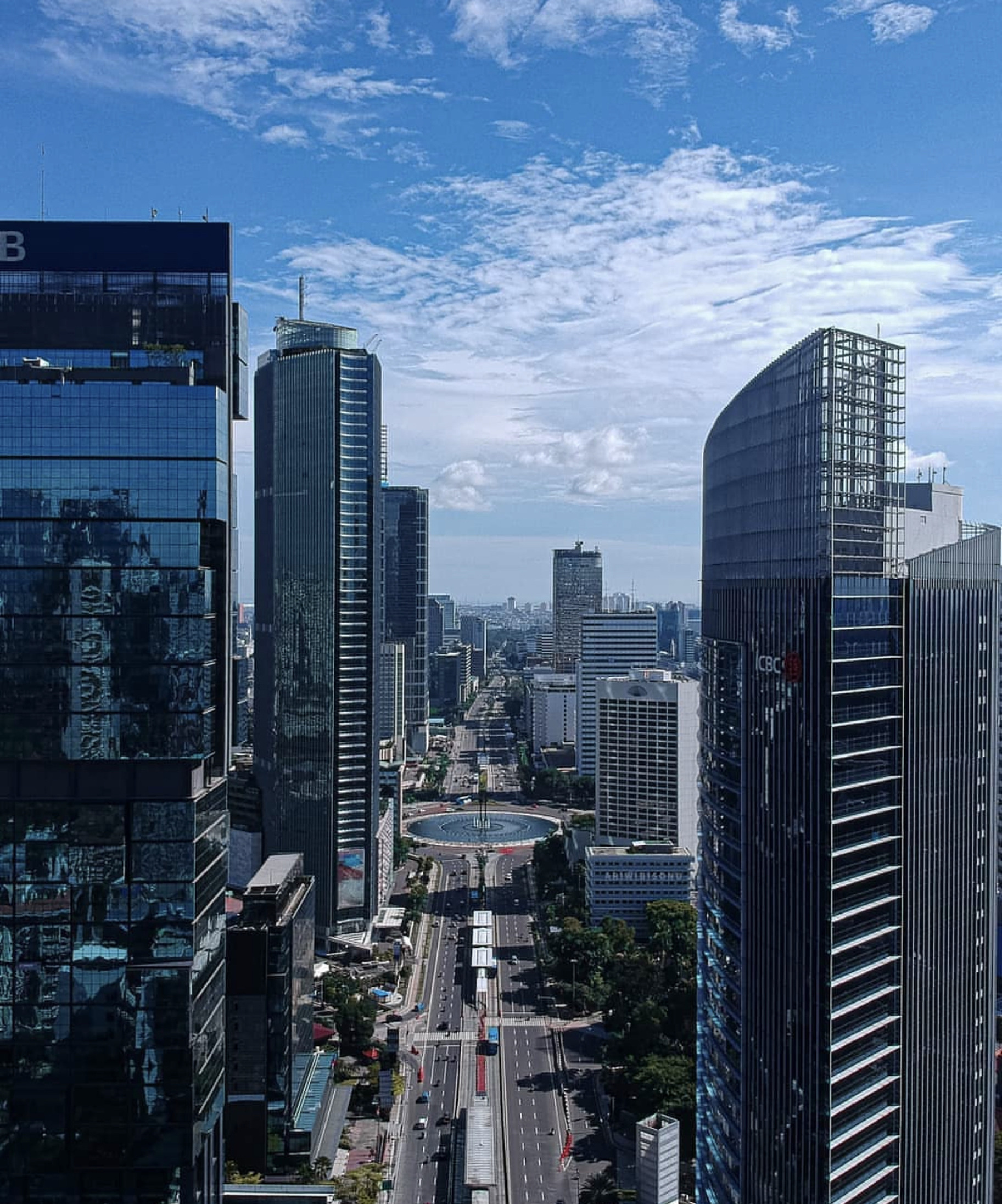
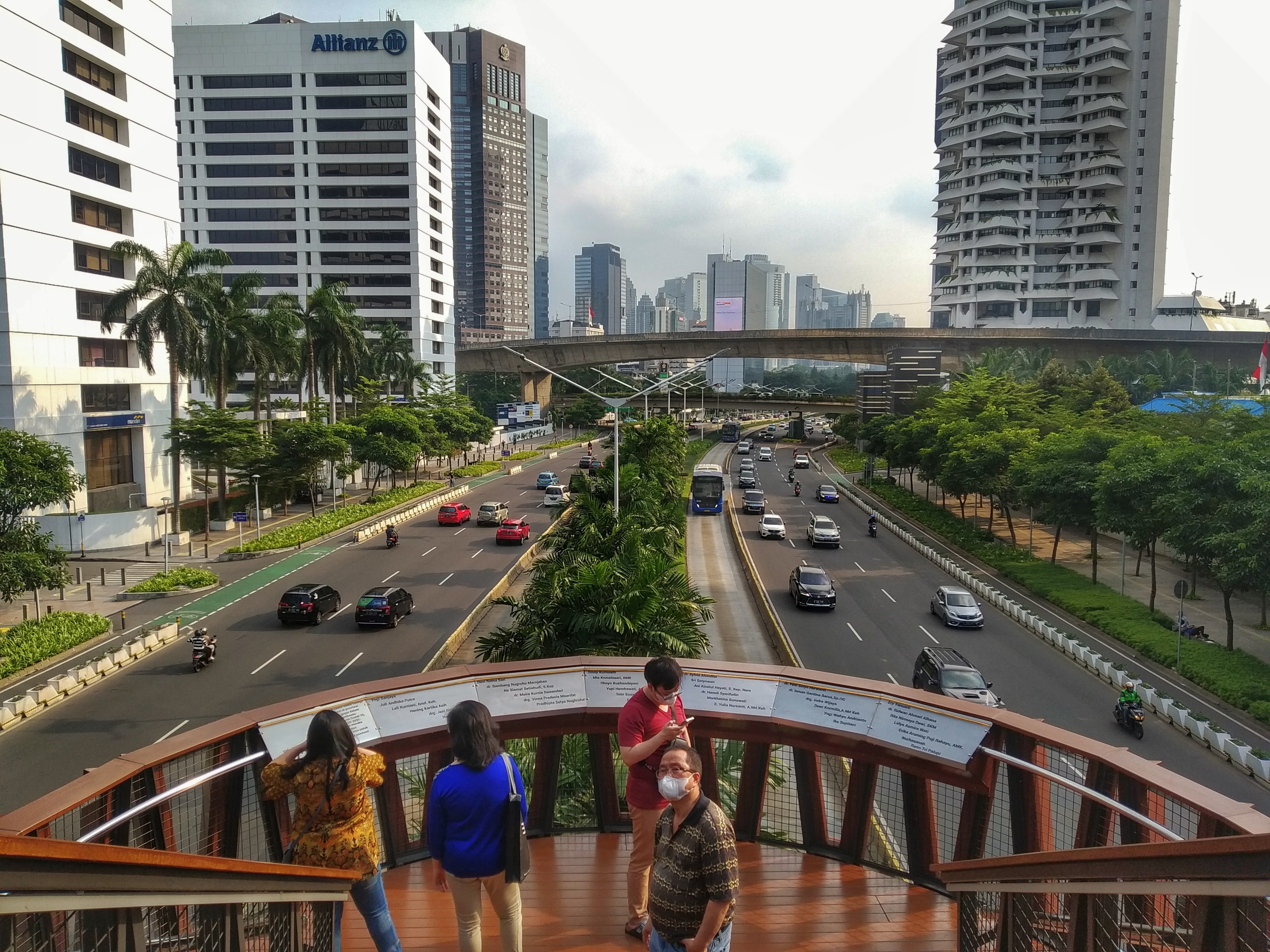
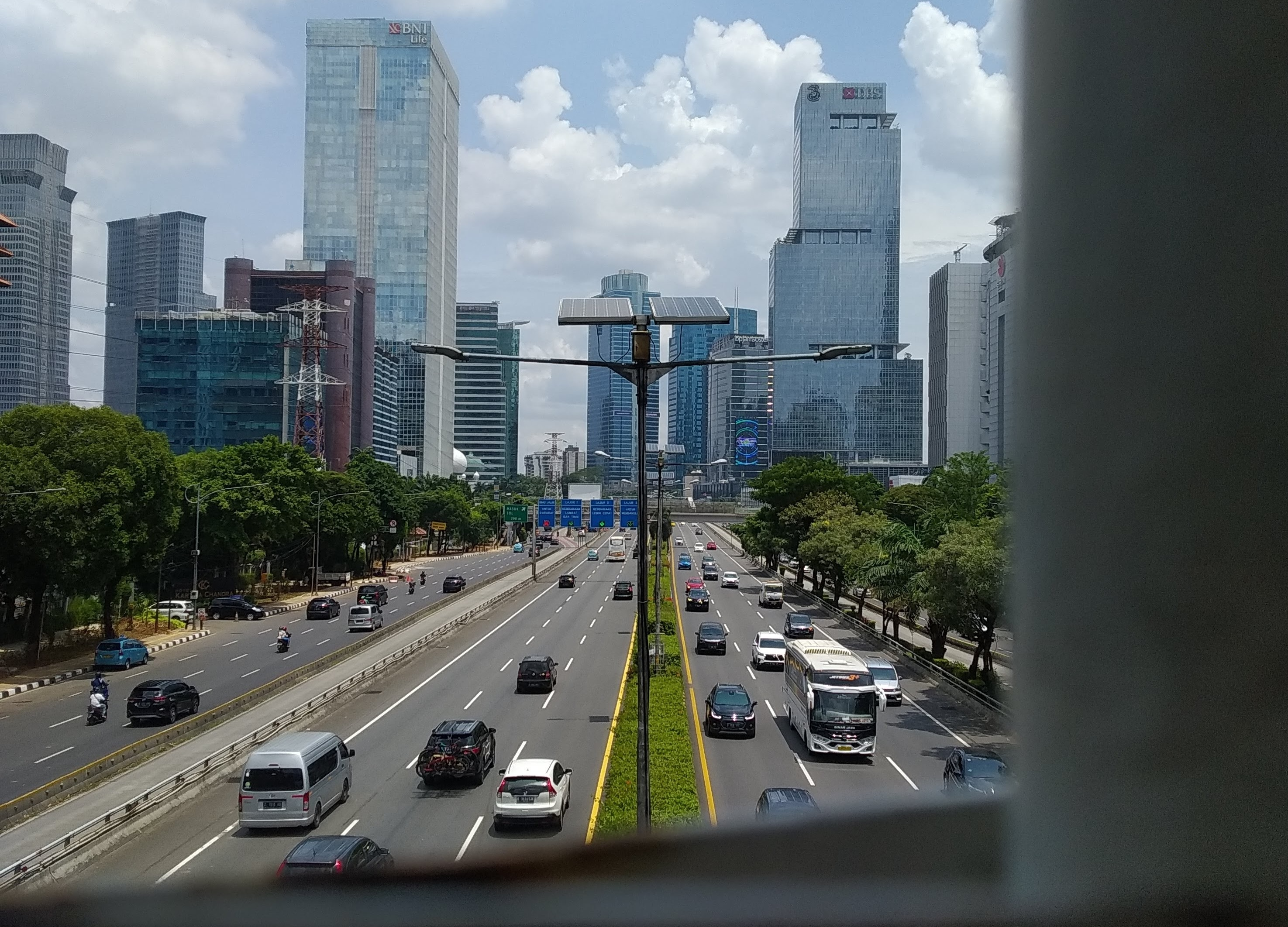
The major streets that form the Golden Triangle area: M.H. Thamrin Street (above), Sudirman Street (middle), and the Gatot Subroto Street

The Golden Triangle is formed by five major streets, on which most skyscrapers, business centers, and foreign embassies in Jakarta are located. These streets are Jalan M.H. Thamrin–Jalan Jenderal Sudirman, Jalan H.R. Rasuna Said, Jalan Prof. Dr. Satrio, and Jalan Jenderal Gatot Subroto.

=== Traffic restrictions ===
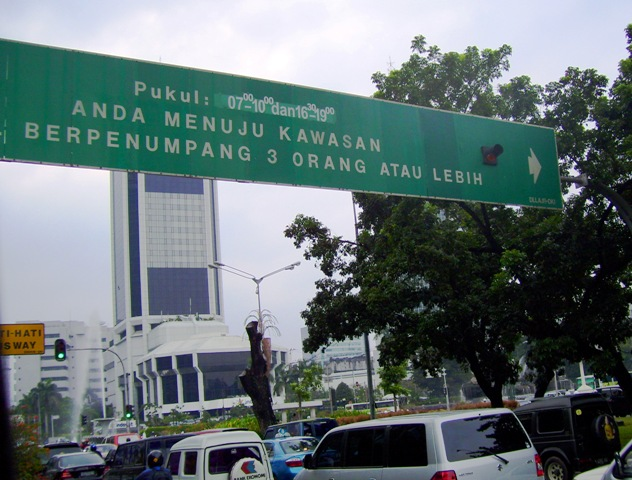
A large green signage indicates the HOV 3+ (Three in One) implementation zone near the Bank Indonesia Roundabout. This traffic restriction scheme was replaced by the Odd–even rationing in 2016

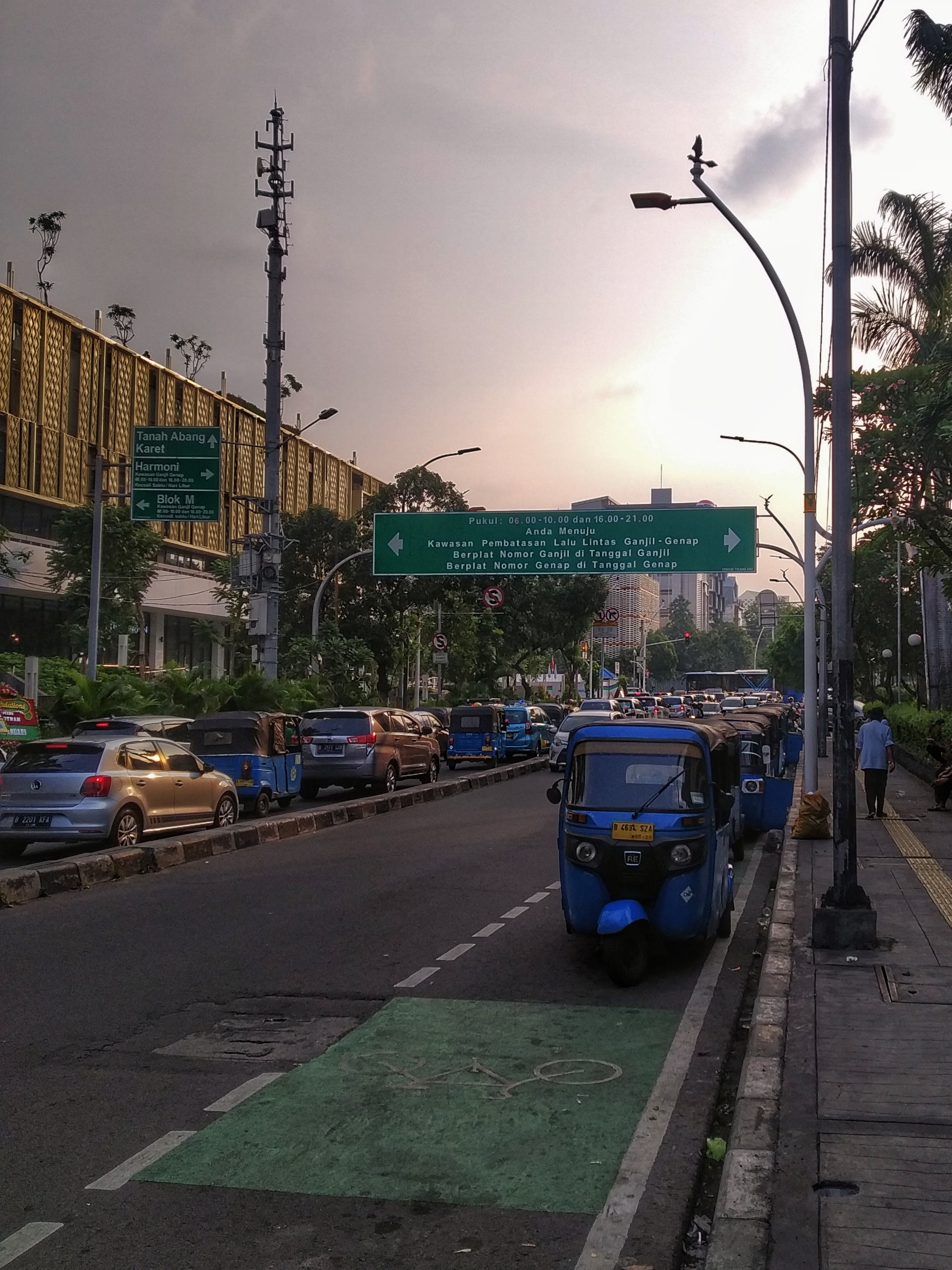
A large green signage indicates the Odd–even rationing implementation zone near the intersection between the M.H. Thamrin Street and the Wahid Hasyim Street.

As the main streets of the central business district, the streets have become the busiest area in Jakarta, with lots of heavy traffic. To reduce the gridlock in the Golden Triangle Area, since the 1990s, the Government of Jakarta began to implement the High-occupancy vehicle lane (HOV) 3+ scheme (commonly known as three in one or 3 in 1) on the West Medan Merdeka, Sudirman, Thamrin, and Gatot Subroto Streets. The 3 in 1 scheme failed due to sluggers or "car jockeys". The 3 in 1 scheme was replaced by the Odd–even rationing scheme in 2016. Currently, odd–even rationing is implemented every Monday to Friday from 06:00-10:00 and 16:00-21:00 on West Medan Merdeka, Sudirman, Thamrin, Gatot Subroto and 22 other streets in Jakarta.

=== Car-Free Day ===
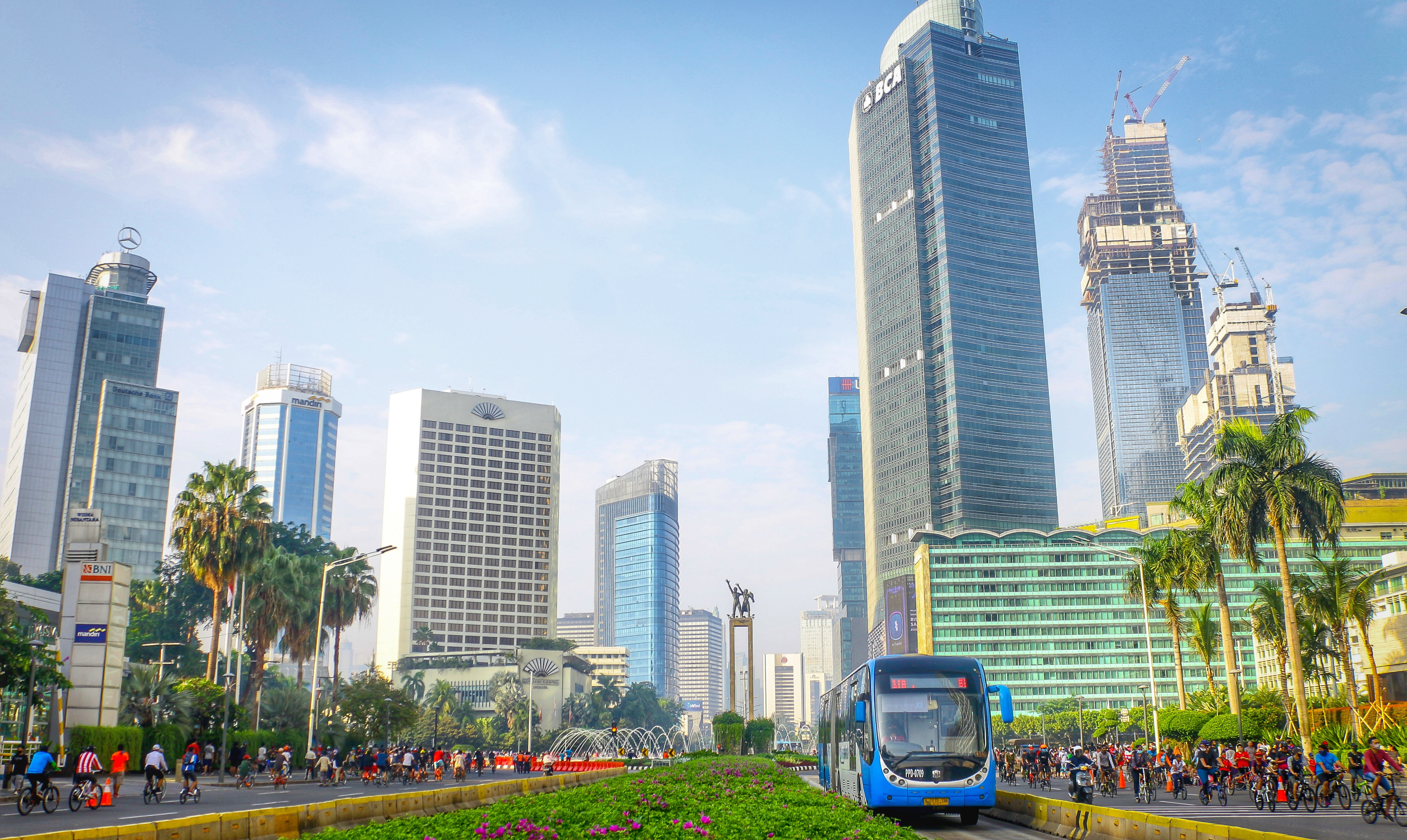
The M.H. Thamrin Street during Car Free Day

To reduce air pollution as the major impact of the gridlock in the Golden Triangle area, In September 2007, the Government of Jakarta held the city's first Car-Free Day that closed the main avenue of the city from cars and invited local pedestrians to exercise and having their activities on the streets that were normally full of cars and traffic. Along the road from the Senayan traffic circle on Jalan Sudirman to the Selamat Datang Monument at the Hotel Indonesia Roundabout on Jalan Thamrin, all the way north to National Monument Central Jakarta, cars are cleared out for pedestrians. Since May 2012, Car-Free Day in Jakarta has been held every Sunday. It is held on the main avenues of the city, Jalan Sudirman and Jalan Thamrin, from the Senayan area to Monas (Monumen Nasional), from 6 AM to 11 AM.

== Transportation ==
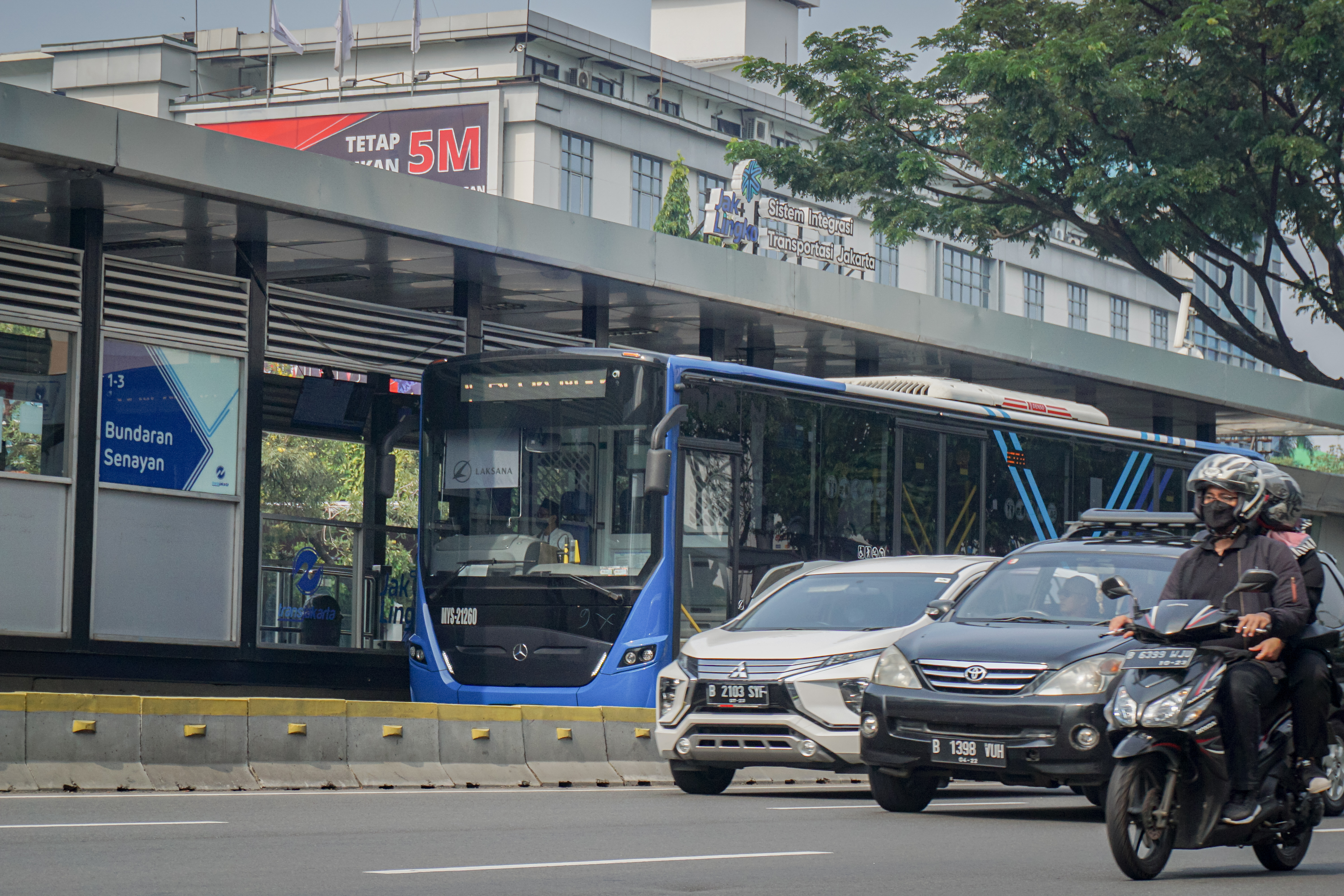
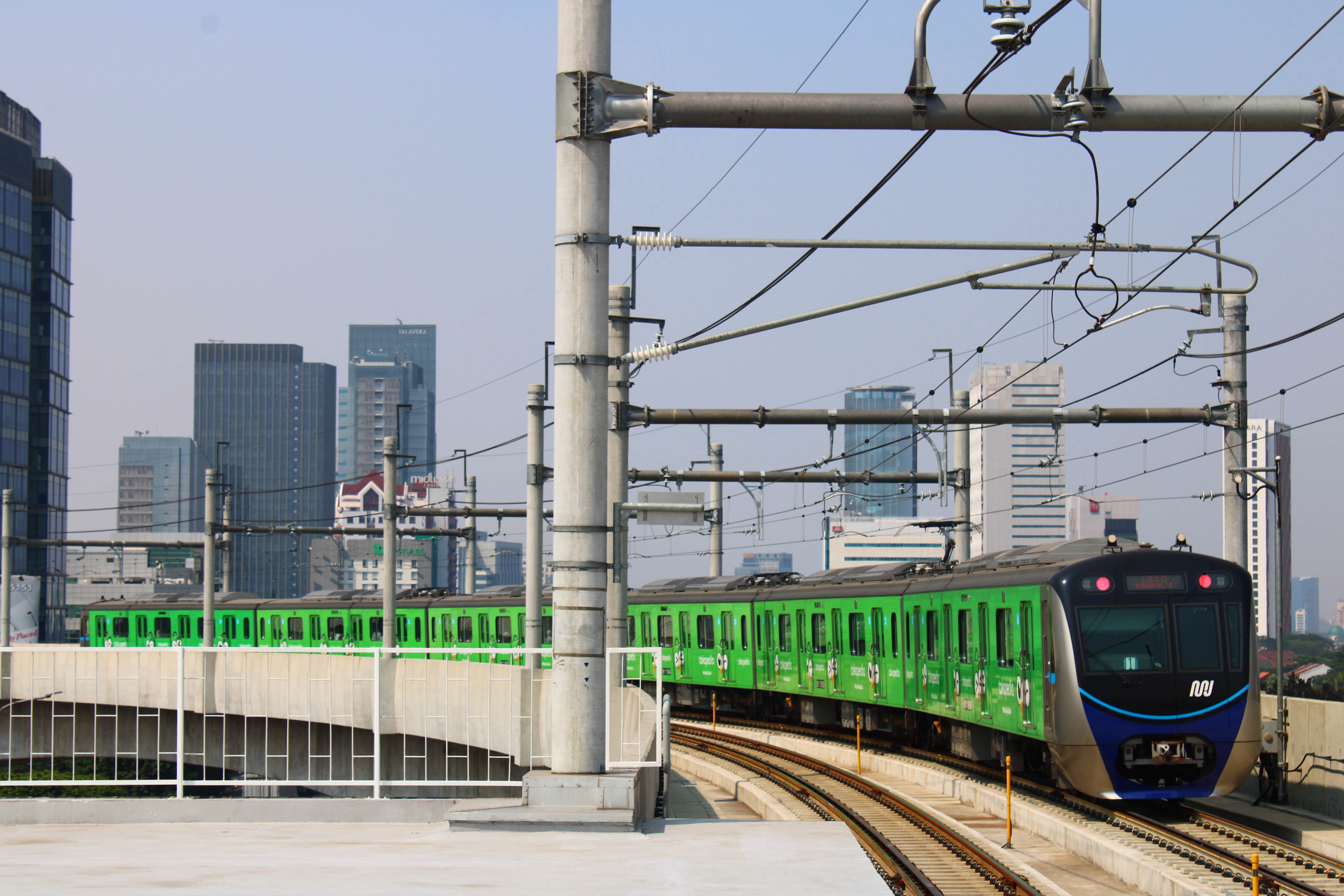
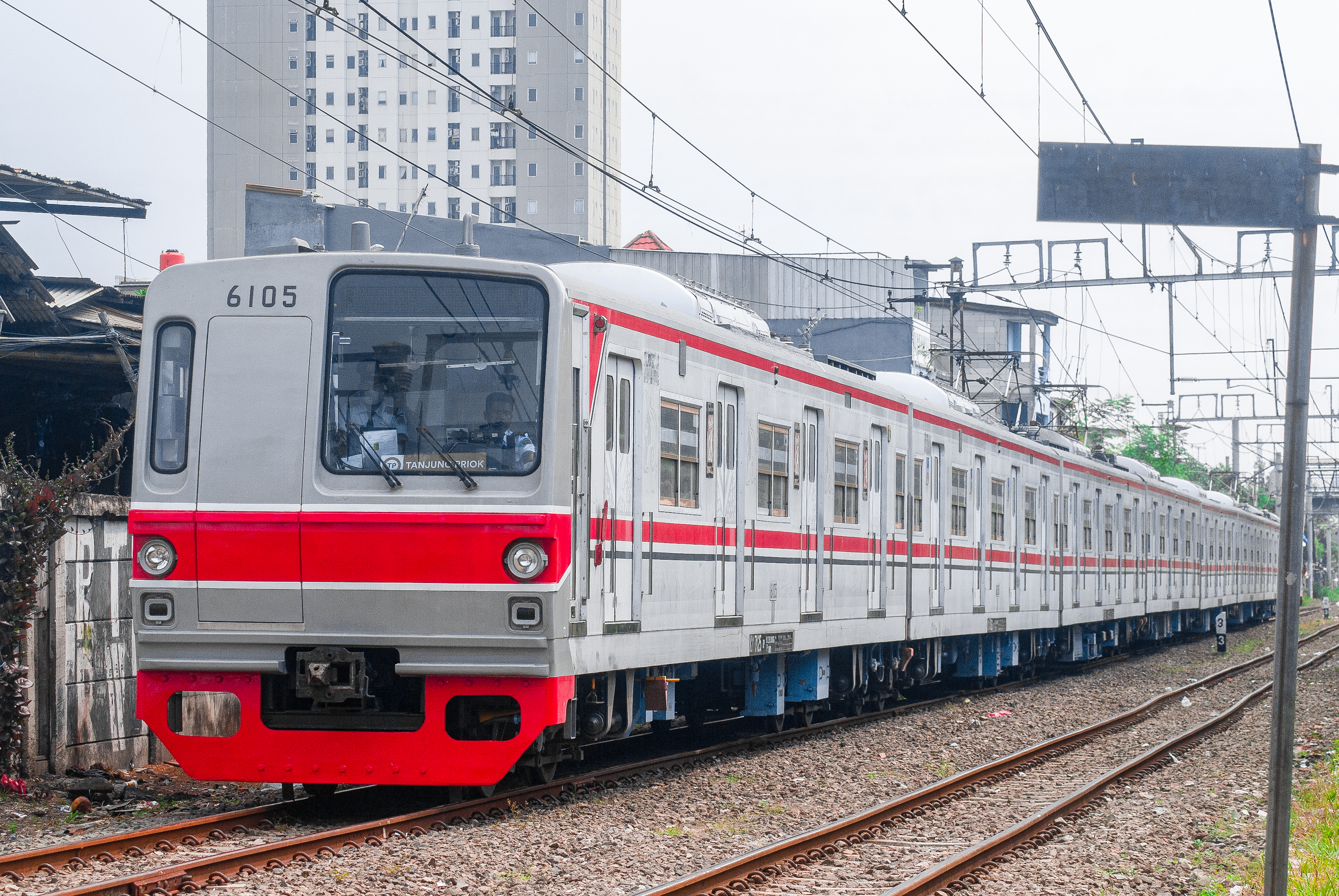
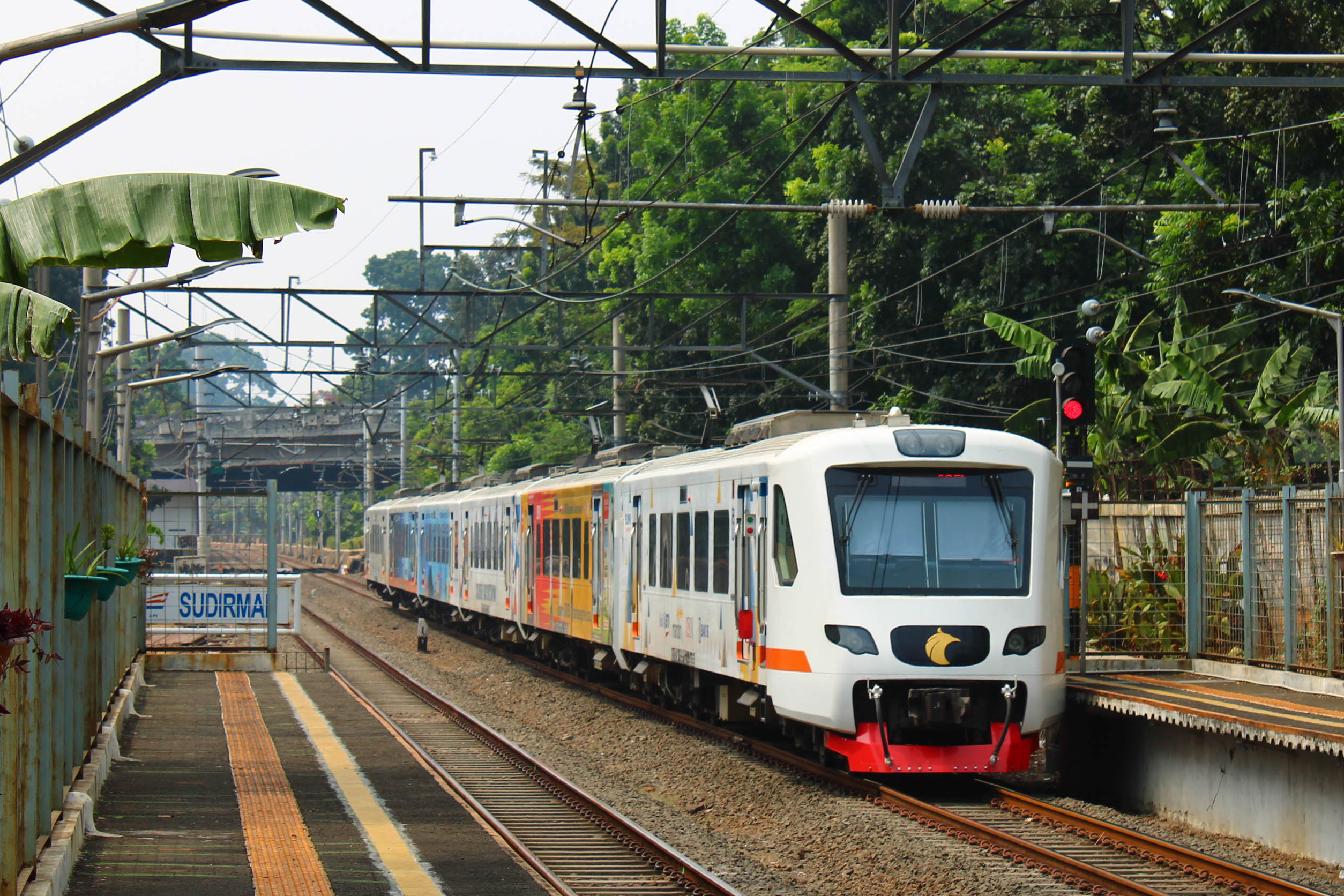
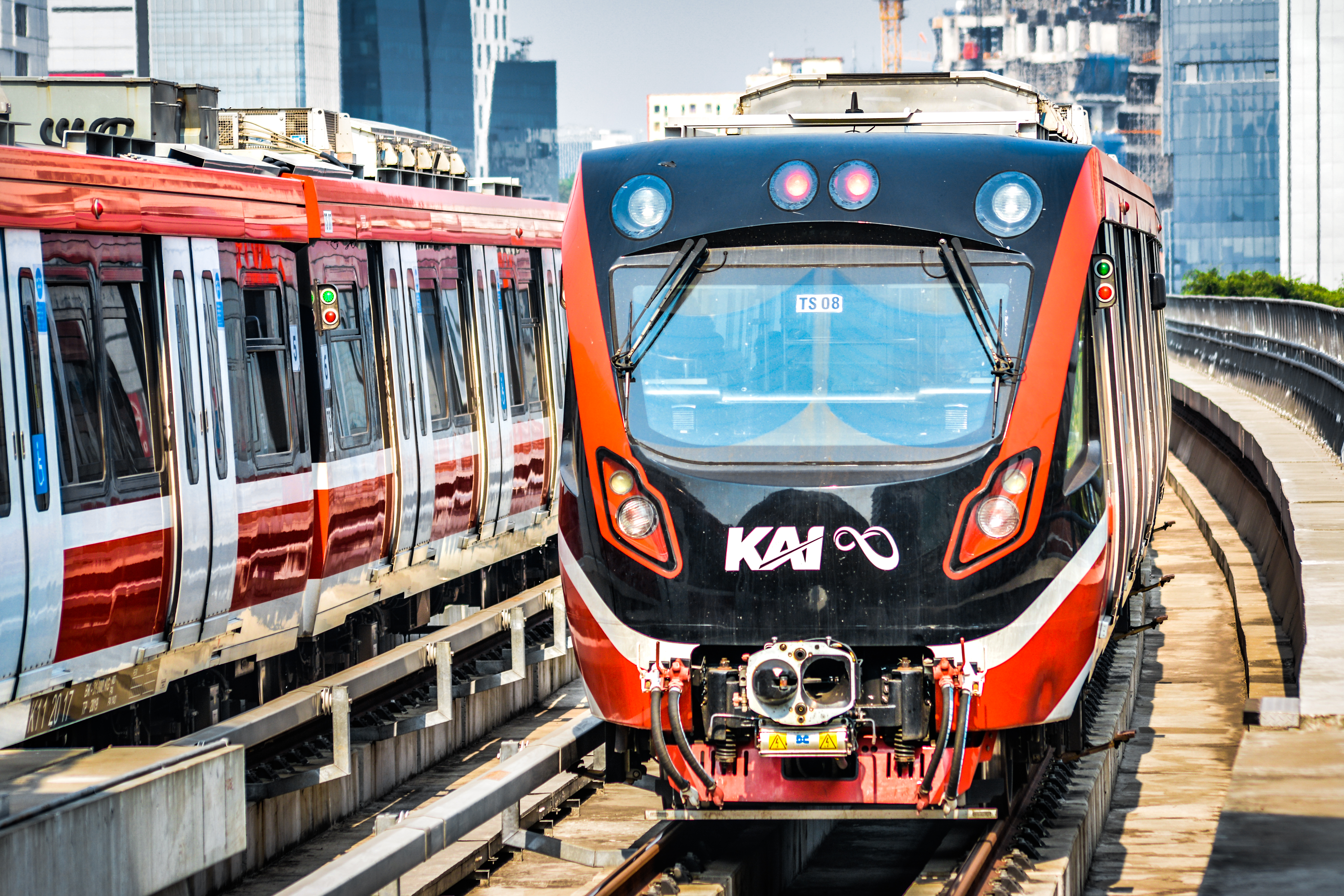
Various transportation services that serve the Golden Triangle area. From above to below: TransJakarta Bus Rapid Transit, Jakarta MRT, KRL Commuterline, the Soekarno-Hatta Airport Rail Link, and the Jabodebek LRT

The area is served by TransJakarta Corridor 1, Corridor 6, and Corridor 9. There are many routes operated by Kopaja, Mayasari Bakti and APTB buses. Sudirman, Cikini and Gondangdia stations of KRL Commuterline are within the area. The North-South line of the Jakarta MRT crosses the area with multiple stations and is also served by the Jabodebek LRT. Here are the lists of transportation services that serve the Golden Triangle Area:

=== Bus routes ===
- TransJakarta
  - Corridor
  - Corridor
  - Corridor
- Transjabodetabek

Former:

- Kopaja
- Metro Mini

=== Train lines ===
- Jakarta MRT
  - North-South Line
- Jabodebek LRT
  - Cibubur Line
  - Bekasi Line
- KRL Commuterline
  - Cikarang Loop Line
- Soekarno–Hatta Airport Rail Link

== See also ==
- Jalan M.H. Thamrin
- Jalan Jenderal Sudirman
- Jalan H.R. Rasuna Said
- Jalan Prof. Dr. Satrio
- Jalan Jenderal Gatot Subroto
- Sudirman Central Business District
- Mega Kuningan
