= Sudirman Central Business District =

Sudirman Central Business District SCBD
- Business district
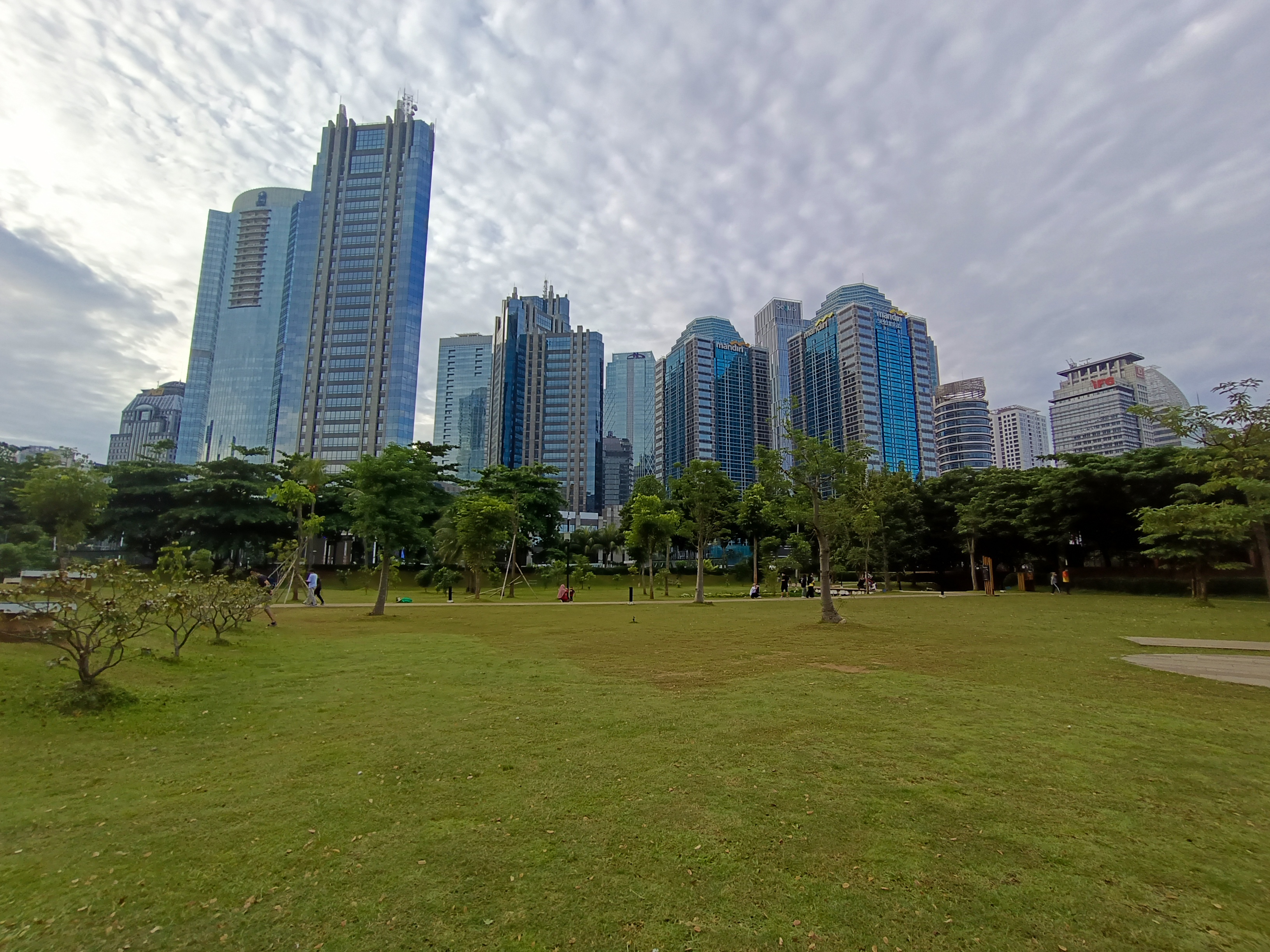
- SCBD taken from GBK City Park

- Interactive map of Sudirman Central Business District
- Coordinates: 6.2262°S 106.8098°E
- Country: Indonesia
- City: South Jakarta
- Province: Jakarta
- Named for: Sudirman

Area
  - Total: 0.45 km^{2} (0.17 sq mi)

Languages
  - Official: Indonesian & English
- Time zone: UTC+07:00 (WIB)
- Postal code: 12190
- Website: scbd.com

Sudirman Central Business District abbreviated and locally known as SCBD, is a business district with an integrated mixed-use development concept, located in Sudirman Avenue, South Jakarta, Indonesia, with many skyscrapers consisting of condominiums, office buildings, hotels, shopping and entertainment centers. The area is considered to be the epicentrum of business in the country, with office spaces inhabited by multinational companies.

SCBD is located within the Golden Triangle of Jakarta and is the best integrated mixed-use development complex in Indonesia. Office spaces in the district is considered the most luxurious and expensive in Indonesia.

Workers in the area are considered to be high-class and elite, since most of the workers wear branded outfits and luxury accessories, which led to a phenomenon known as "SCBD Lifestyle".

SCBD is one of the densest areas in the city, with total area of 45 hectares, which is divided into 25 lots. About 13 hectares of the district are used to develop road network and landscaping. SCBD is comparable with that of Canary Wharf in London, and KLCC in Kuala Lumpur.

== Notable buildings ==
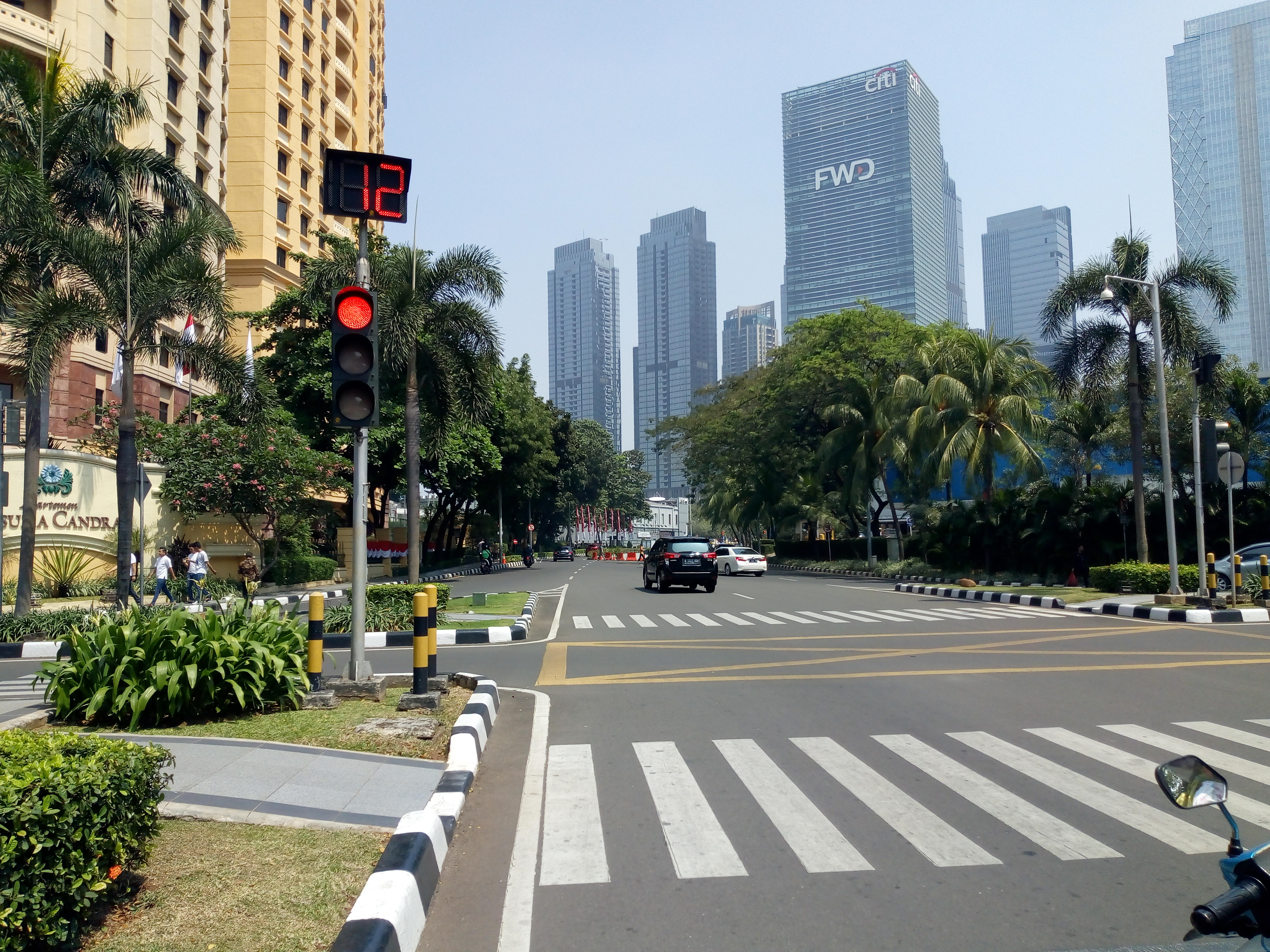
SCBD from street level

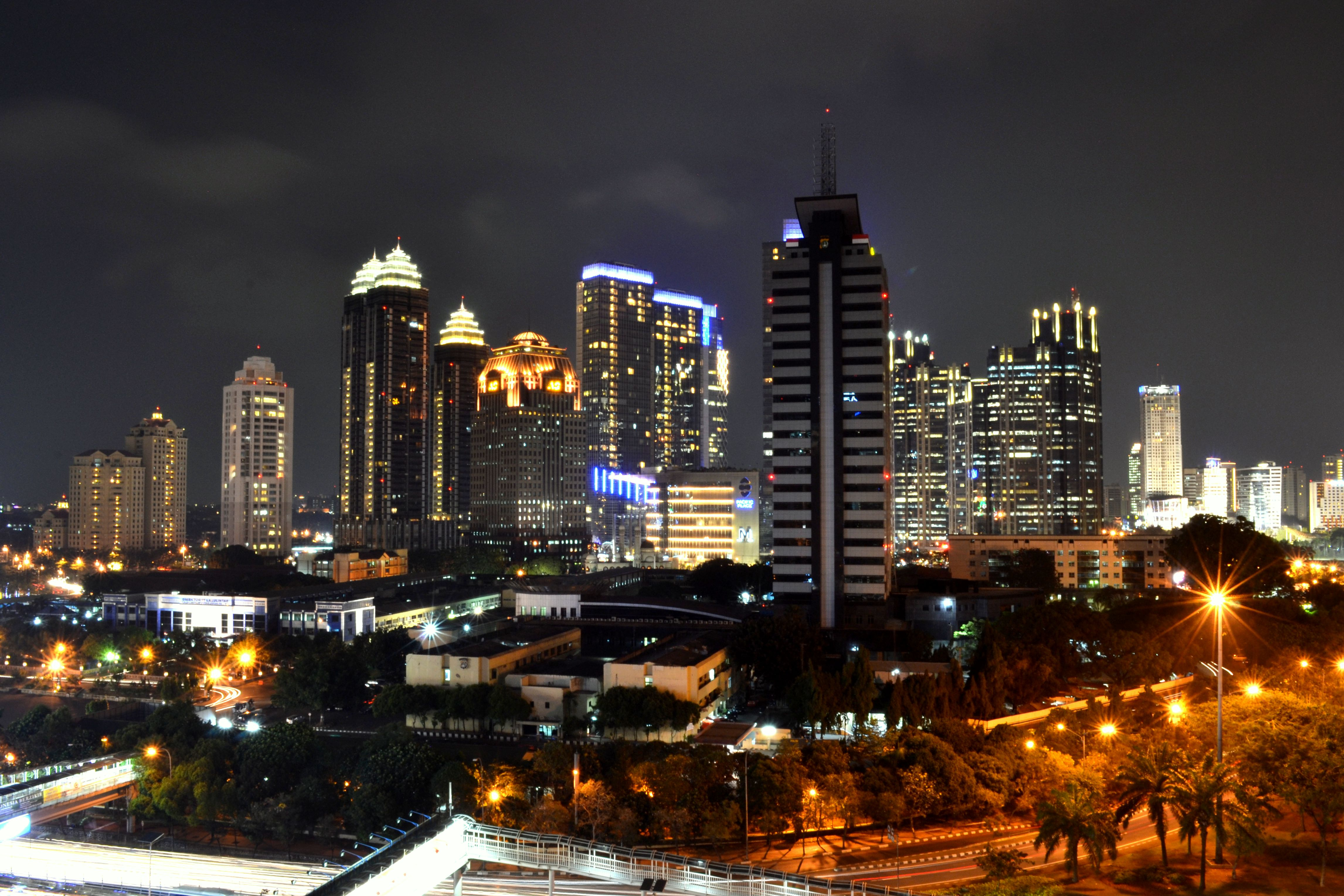
SCBD Skyline

As of January 2024, the fifth tallest building in Jakarta, Treasury Tower is located in the district.

Once completed, Jakarta Signature Tower will be the 5th tallest building in the world (although it may be potentially canceled or it will be restarting soon construction in 2025)

Notable buildings in this district are:

- Treasury Tower
- Pacific Place Jakarta
- Equity Tower
- The Energy
- District 8
- Revenue Tower
- Indonesia Stock Exchange
- Discovery SCBD
- Pacific Century Place
  - Head office of CitiBank Indonesia
  - Head office of FWD
- Sequis Centre Tower
- SCBD Suites
- Artha Graha Building
  - Embassies
    - Jordan (9th floor)
    - Mauritania (23th floor)
    - Taiwan (Economic and Trade Office; 12th floor)
- Capital Residence
- Kusuma Candra
- Bengkel Space
- SCBD Park

== Transportation ==
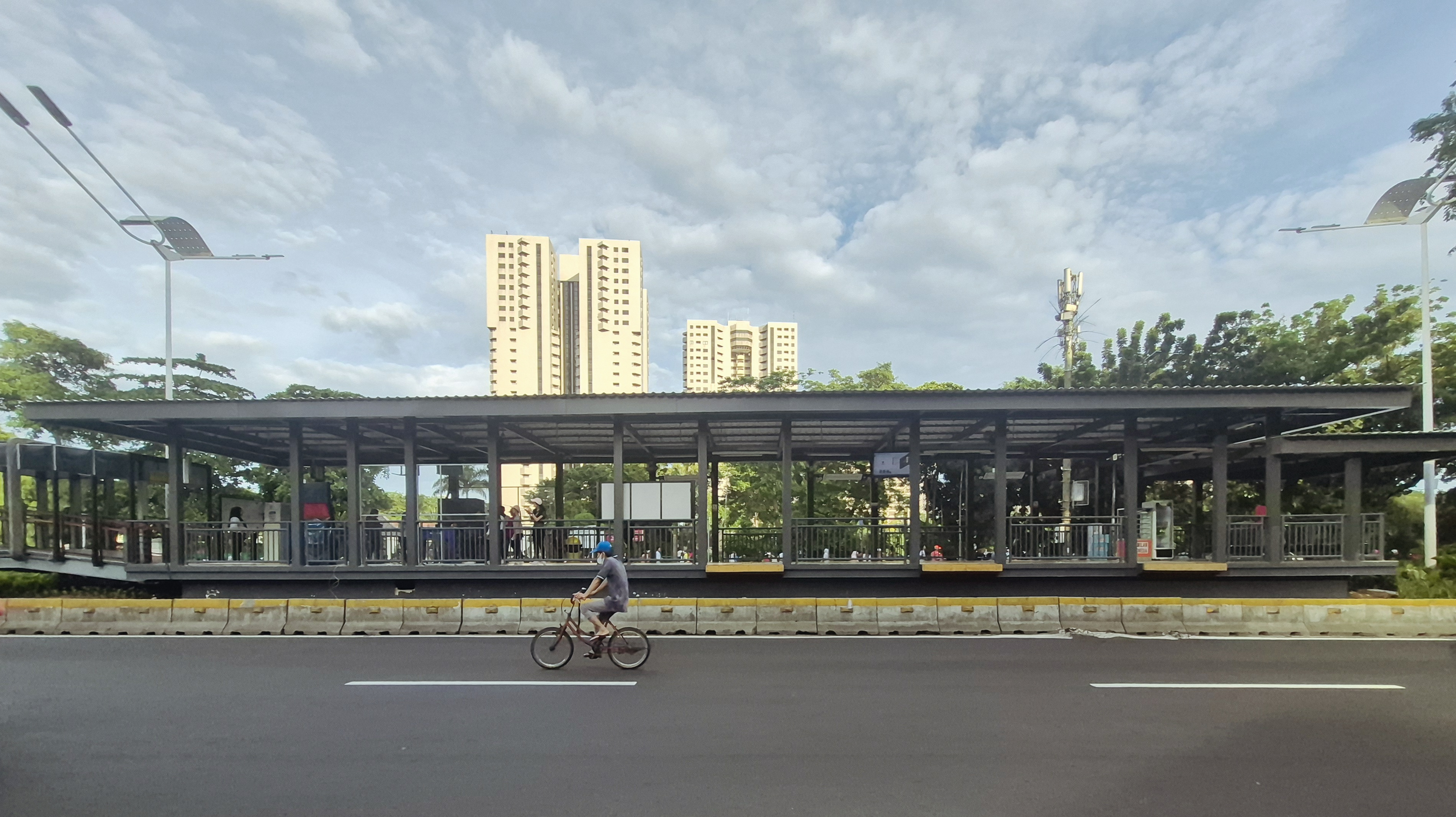
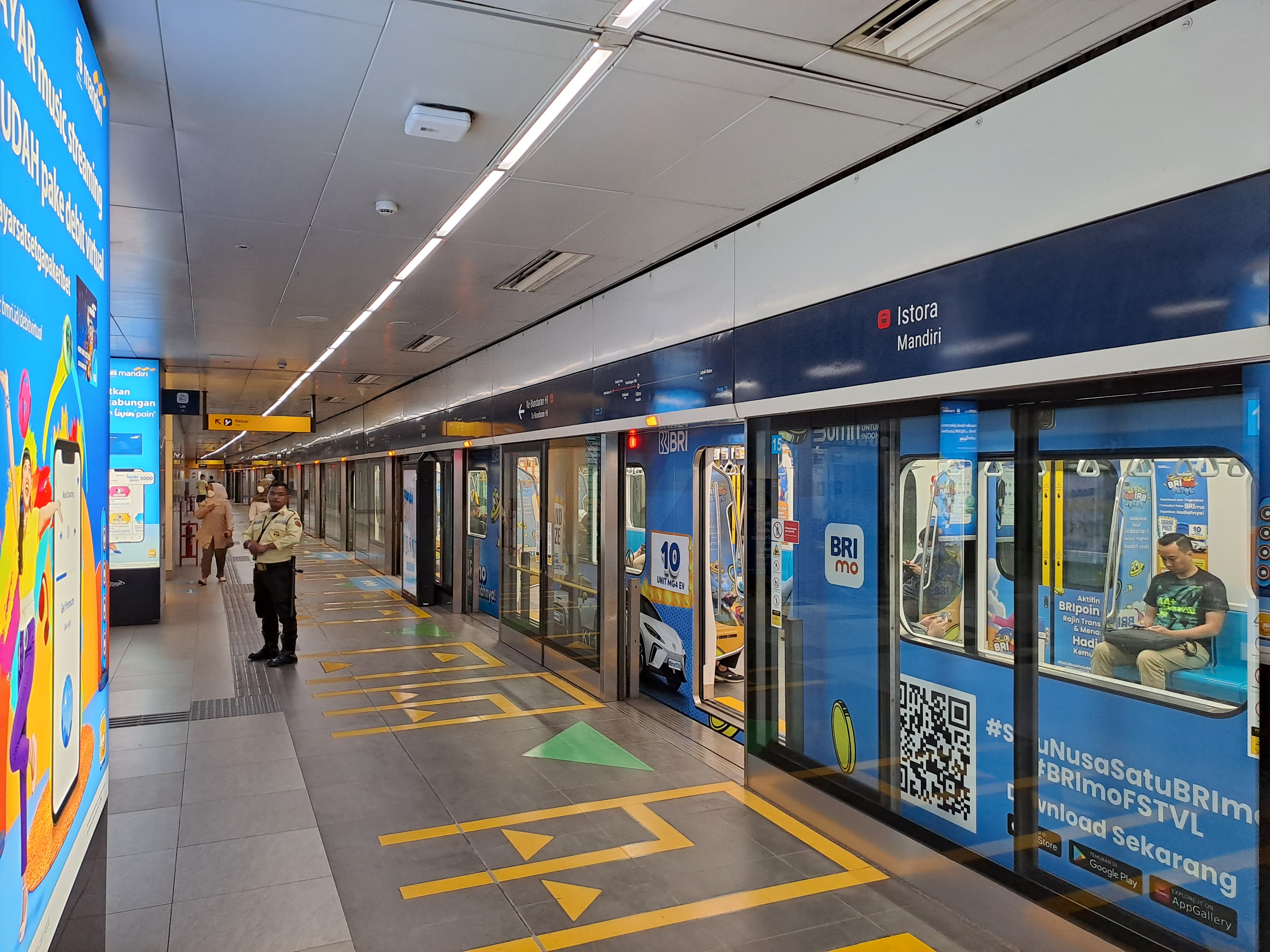
There are two main transportation services that serves the SCBD, the Transjakarta BRT at the Polda Metro Jaya BRT station (above) and the Jakarta MRT at the Istora Mandiri Station

SCBD is served by Transjakarta corridor 1 and corridor 9. Other bus service providers such as Mayasari Bakti also serves the SCBD. Those bus routes passes through main avenues surrounding the district and connect the district with other parts of the city. SCBD is also integrated with Istora Mandiri Station of the Jakarta MRT on Jalan Jenderal Sudirman. During busy hours, free shuttle buses are available to move within the district at 8–10 minutes interval. A tunnel near the Istora Mandiri MRT station connecting the Pacific Place Mall, the Indonesia Stock Exchange building and the pedestrian sidewalk.

Here are the list of transportation services that serves the SCBD:

=== Bus routes ===
==== Transjakarta ====
- Corridor at:
  - Polda Metro Jaya
- Corridor at:
  - Senayan Bank Jakarta
- Corridor at:
  - Semanggi
  - Widya Chandra Telkomsel

=== Rail lines ===
North–South Line of the Jakarta MRT with two stations:

- Senayan Mastercard MRT station
- Istora Mandiri

== See also ==
- List of tallest buildings in Indonesia
- List of tallest buildings in Jakarta
- List of tallest buildings in Asia
- Central business district
