= Irzen Octa =

Irzen Octa was a minor businessman and secretary general of the National Unifying Party (PPB), a small Indonesian party. On March 29, 2011, aged 49, he was found outside a Citibank branch in Jakarta and died of a brain hemorrhage on the way to hospital. The police found traces of blood on the wall and curtains of a fifth-floor room. In connection with the crime, police arrested three third-party Citibank debt collectors. In late September 2011, the prosecution announced that five third-party debt collectors would be charged, including three for false imprisonment (carrying a maximum sentence of eight years).

Irzen Octa left a wife and two teenage daughters. His widow is suing Citibank for three trillion rupiahs (roughly 350 million US dollars).

The case has severely affected the reputation of Citibank Indonesia, which was also faced with a spectacular case of embezzlement by one of its employees around the same time. Bank Indonesia banned Citibank for two years from processing new credit card applications and outsourcing debt collection.
