= Sequis Center Tower =

Sequis Tower
- Interactive map of the Sequis Tower area

General information
- Type: Office
- Location: Jakarta, Indonesia, Jalan Jenderal Sudirman Kav.71
- Coordinates: 6.2256045°S 106.8071378°E
- Construction started: 2014
- Completed: 2018
- Cost: 1,3 Trillion Rupiah (USD 87 Million)
- Owner: PT Prospero Realty

Height
- Architectural: 206.3 m (677 ft)
- Tip: 206.3 metres (677 ft)
- Top floor: 182.1 m (597 ft)

Technical details
- Floor count: 40

Design and construction
- Architect: Kohn Pedersen Fox Associates
- Developer: PT Farpoint Prima
- Structural engineer: Thornton Tomasetti
- Main contractor: PT Total Bangun Persada

Sequis Tower is a 210 metres (690 ft) tall skyscraper at Sudirman Central Business District, South Jakarta, Indonesia. This is a LEED Platinum building. The design of the tower is inspired from the Banyan tree with a bundle of four towers, with gardens on the roof featuring typical local plants. To reduce the amount of energy, Sequis Tower has adopted the design of shading fins that can compensate for solar radiation on the building facade. Sequis Tower's open plaza has pedestrian access to Pacific Place, The Alila Hotel, Jakarta Stock Exchange, Bapindo Towers, Sequis Center, The Energy Tower, Graha CIMB Niaga and MRT Jakarta's Istora station. The tower is topped off in March, 2017.

== See also ==
- List of tallest buildings in Indonesia
- List of tallest buildings in Jakarta
