= Pacific Century Place Jakarta =

Skyscraper in Jakarta

Pacific Century Place
- Interactive map of the Pacific Century Place area

General information
- Type: Mixed
- Location: Jakarta, Indonesia, Sudirman Central Business District, Lot-10
- Coordinates: 6.2276837°S 106.8084445°E
- Construction started: 2014
- Completed: 2017

Height
- Architectural: 209.3 m (687 ft)
- Tip: 209.3 m
- Top floor: 184.7 m (606 ft)

Technical details
- Floor count: 40
- Floor area: 151,000 m² / 1,625,350 ft²

Design and construction
- Architect: Pandega Desain Weharima (PDW)
- Developer: Pacific Century Premium Developments Ltd. (PT. Prima Bangun Investama)
- Main contractor: PT. Takenaka Indonesia, Total Bangun Persada

Pacific Century Place Jakarta, also known as PCP Tower, is a skyscraper at Sudirman Central Business District in South Jakarta, Indonesia. The tower has 40 floors above the ground and 6 floors as basement. It is 211 meters high. The basement of the building is used as podium and for car parking. The podium has retail space, bank and club. The skyscraper was completed in 2017. It is the new home for head office of Citibank Indonesia.

The building's elevators were supplied by Berca Schindler.

On 15 February 2023, a flexible workplace facility was launched at the tower by PCP management, in collaboration with The Executive Centre (TEC), a Hong Kong based company.

== See also ==
- List of tallest buildings in Jakarta
- List of tallest buildings in Indonesia
- SCBD
