= Treasury Tower =

Indonesian skyscraper

Coordinates: 6.207163°S 106.821499°E

- Treasury Tower @ District 8
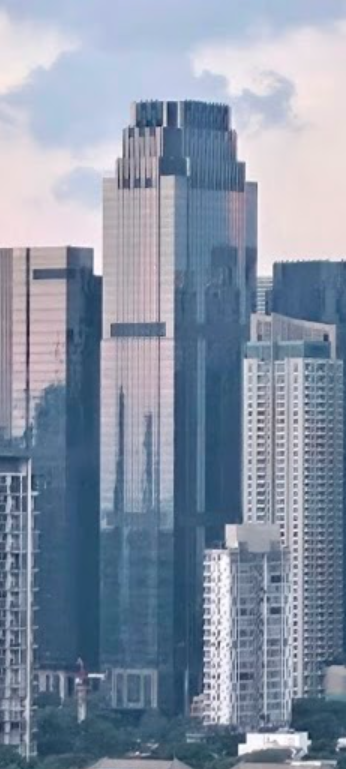
- Interactive map of the Treasury Tower area

General information
- Type: office
- Location: Jakarta, Indonesia, Lot 28, Sudirman Central Business District
- Construction started: 2013
- Completed: 2018

Height
- Architectural: 279.5 m (917 ft)
- Tip: 279.5 m (917 ft)
- Top floor: 260.6 m (855 ft)

Technical details
- Floor count: 61
- Lifts/elevators: Made by KONE

Design and construction
- Architects: PT Akamas Aseri & Forrec
- Developer: PT Agung Sedayu Group
- Structural engineer: PT Wiratman & Associates

Treasury Tower is a 279.5-meter-tall skyscraper at District 8 complex in Sudirman Central Business District (SCBD) in South Jakarta. As of April 2024, it is the fifth-tallest building in Jakarta. The architectural height of the tower is 279.5 meters and the top floor is situated at 260.6 meters. Construction was completed in 2016. Treasury Tower is one of three commercial office towers in District 8, which also comprises one hotel and seven residential apartment towers.

== See also ==
- District 8 Jakarta
- List of tallest buildings in Indonesia
- List of tallest buildings in Jakarta
- List of tallest buildings in Asia
