= District 8 Jakarta =

Coordinates: 6.2288278°S 106.8070871°E

District 8 @ SCBD
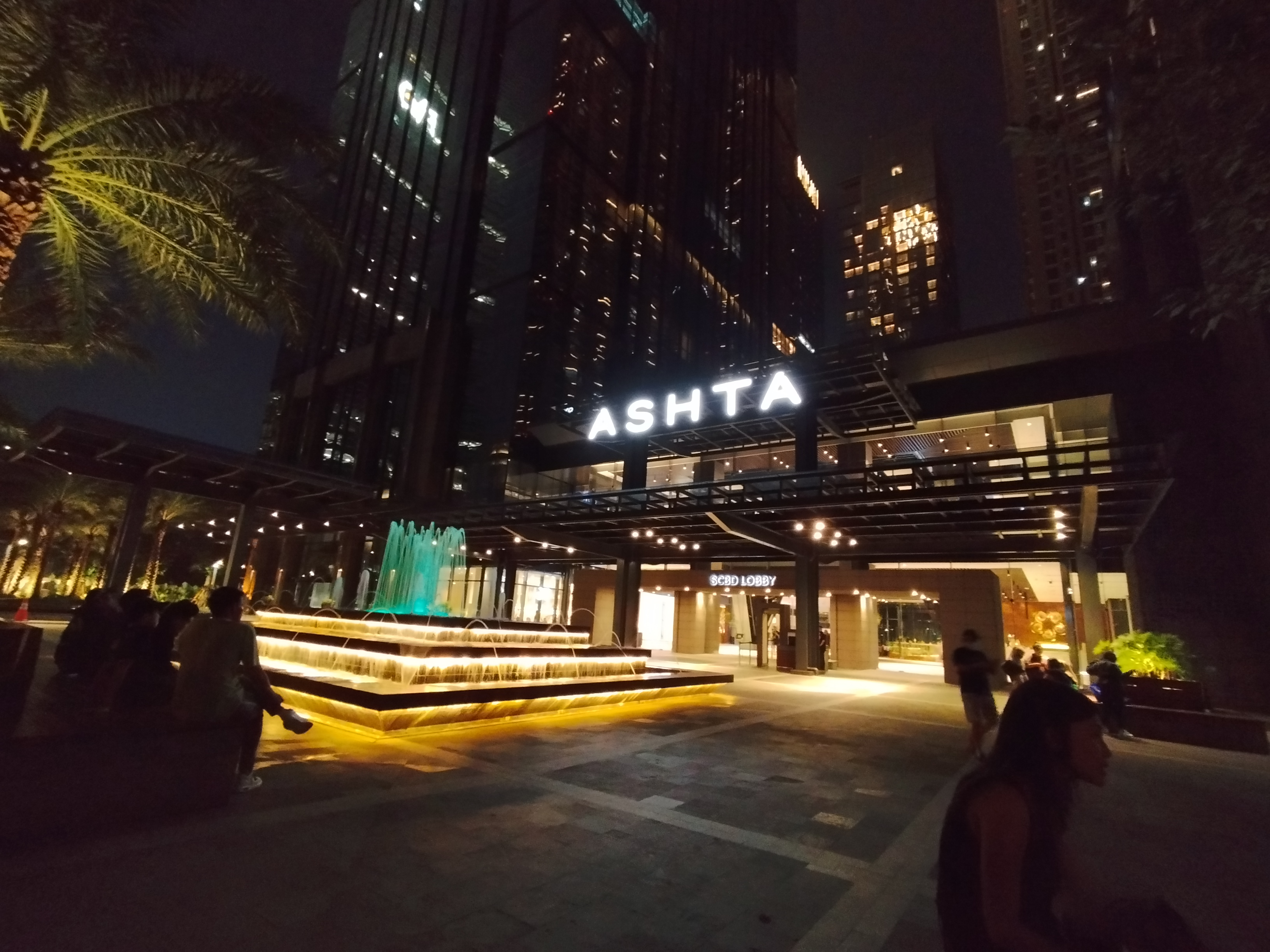
- The lobby of ASHTA shopping mall within the District 8 complex
- Interactive map of the District 8 @ SCBD area

General information
- Type: Hotel; Commercial offices Residential; Shopping mall
- Architectural style: Modern
- Location: Lot 28 Sudirman Central Business District, Jakarta, Indonesia
- Construction started: 2013
- Completed: 2017

Height
- Antenna spire: 917 ft (280 m)
- Roof: 917 ft (280 m)
- Top floor: 855 ft (261 m)

Technical details
- Floor count: 64 floors x 1; 55 floors x 2; 43 floors x 4; 34 floors x 1; 32 floors x 1; 26 floors x 1

Design and construction
- Architects: Airmas asri & Forrec
- Developer: Agung Sedayu Group
- Structural engineer: Wiratman & Associate
- Main contractor: Acset-Daewoo

Website
- www.district8jakarta.com

District 8 Jakarta is a mixed development complex of 10 towers and a shopping mall named ASHTA at Sudirman Central Business District, and adjacent Senopati area in Kebayoran Baru, South Jakarta, Indonesia. It is developed and owned by Agung Sedayu Group (ASG). The tallest building of this complex is Treasury Tower. Total land area of the complex is about 4.8 hectares. The complex has a retail area of about 15,000 square meters, dubbed Astha shopping mall.

The complex is being developed by Agung Sedayu Group. Most of its buildings were topped out by January 2017. The first Langham Hotel and Residence in Southeast Asia is located in the complex. A serviced apartment building is operated by Oakwood. As of September 2026, the fifth tallest building in Jakarta Treasury Tower is located within this complex.

Skyscrapers of District 8 Jakarta complex are as follows,

Rank	Name	Height m	Floors	Year
1	Treasury Tower	279.5	57	2017
2	Eternity Apartment @ District 8	205	51	2017
3	Infinity Apartment @ District 8	205	51	2017
4	Residence 8 @ Senopati Tower A	187.9	43	2012
5	Residence 8 @ Senopati Tower B	187.9	43	2012
6	Residence 8 @ Senopati Equity Tower	160.6	32	2012
7	District 8 Office Tower 2	175	43	2017
8	District 8 Office Tower 3	175	43	2017
9	District 8 Residential Tower 3	138	34	2017
10	District 8 Hotel/Residential Tower	106	26	2017

== Ashta District 8 ==
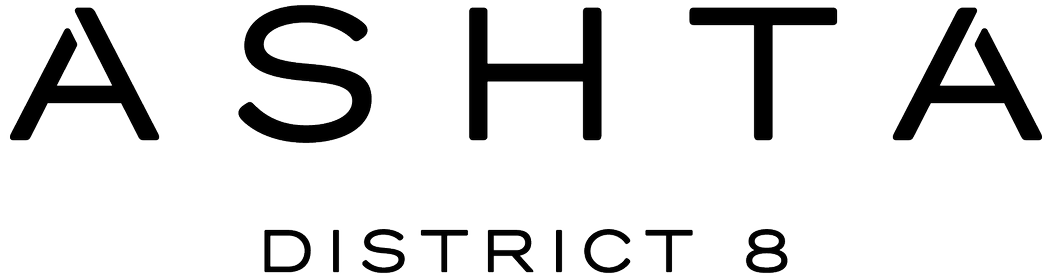
The logo of the shopping mall

Ashta District 8 (stylized in all caps) is the high-end shopping mall within District 8, officially opened on 11 November 2020. It is managed under ASG's subsidiary, Agung Sedayu Realestat Indonesia (ASRI). The anchor tenants of Ashta are Flix Cinema (an exclusive movie theater chain for ASRI-managed malls, including Mall of Indonesia), The Gourmet by Ranch Market, CS Fresh, and %Arabica café.

Ashta District 8 is known for its open-air top deck, featuring eco-friendly public space with astonishing view of the skyscrapers within District 8. Many Jakartans flocked into the mall's top deck at dusk or night.

== See also ==
- List of tallest buildings in Indonesia
  - List of tallest buildings in Jakarta
- List of shopping malls in Indonesia
  - List of shopping malls in Jakarta
