= Pacific Place Jakarta =

Pacific Place

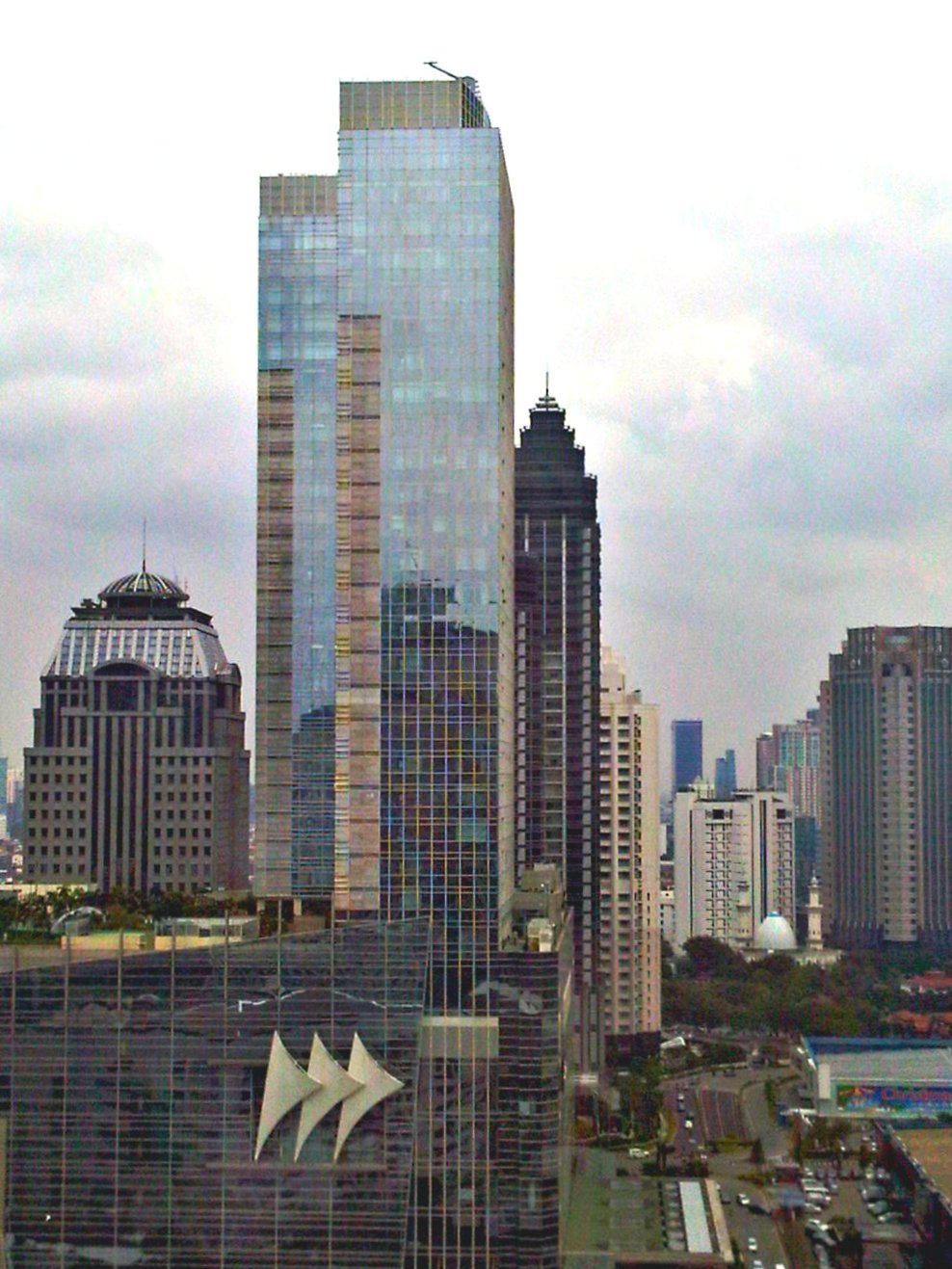
- Location: South Jakarta, Indonesia
- Coordinates: 6.224452°S 106.809645°E
- Address: Sudirman Central Business District, Jl Jend Sudirman Kav 52-53, Kebayoran Baru
- Opened: November 2007
- Developer: PT. Pacific Place Jakarta
- Manager: PT. Pacific Place Jakarta
- Owner: PT. Artharaya Bintang Semesta, PT. Mutiara Mulia Permata, PT. Panin Investment
- Num. of anchor tenants: 5 (Galeries Lafayette, Kidzania, Kem Chicks, CGV, Best Denki)
- Floors: 9 (2 underground)
- Public transit: Polda Metro Jaya; Istora Mandiri
- Website: Pacific Place

The Pacific Place Jakarta is a multipurpose building located in the Sudirman Central Business District, South Jakarta, Indonesia. The building is divided into three different sections: the six-floor Pacific Place Mall, the One Pacific Place Office Center, The Ritz-Carlton Pacific Place hotel, ballroom, and service apartment, and Pacific Place Residence. The mall opened in November 2007, and in January 2017 was recognized by Forbes as one of the top shopping malls in Jakarta.

== Shops and building inside ==
The basement level includes Bloomberg News, Bloomberg Television, Kem Chicks supermarket, restaurants, ATMs, and a bridge to the Ritz Carlton Hotel towers, and the Jakarta Stock Exchange. The Ritz Carlton Pacific Place is the only hotel in the building and has 62 rooms. The One Pacific Place building is the only office block of the building, located north of the building. Galeries Lafayette, the luxurious French department store, had opened a branch in the mall as of 2013, the second of its kind after Dubai in Asia. In 2015, Prada and Miu Miu have both opened their respective stores in this mall. In 2022, a Japanese store, Muji opened in this mall on the fourth floor.

== Gallery ==
The Ritz-Carlton Jakarta Pacific Place

Pacific Place Mall

== See also ==
- List of shopping malls in Indonesia
