= Patung Pemuda Membangun =

Statue in Jakarta, Indonesia

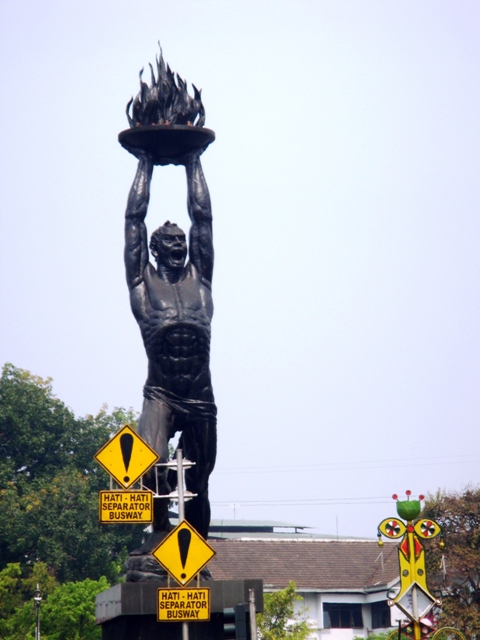
- Patung Pemuda Membangun in the south end of Jalan Jenderal Sudirman.
- Year: 1971
- Medium: steel-framed concrete covered with terrazzo layer.
- Movement: Realism
- Dimensions: 24.9 m (980 in)
- Location: Jakarta
- 6.229293°S 106.799416°E
- Owner: Jakarta City Government

Patung Pemuda Membangun (translated as Youth Advancement Monument or simply Youth Monument) is a statue located at the southern end of Jalan Jenderal Sudirman, Jakarta, Indonesia. The statue marks the entrance to Kebayoran Baru subdistrict in South Jakarta.

== Description ==
Patung Pemuda Membangun is a 25-meter Soviet-style dark-grey terrazzo statue which stands on a roundabout at the south end of Jalan Jenderal Sudirman. The roundabout marks the entrance to the Kebayoran Baru subdistrict in South Jakarta. The statue was erected to inspire people to participate in the nation's building, especially the youths of the new nation. The name Pemuda Membangun ("Youth Advancement") was chosen to inspire young people. The design of the statue shows a near naked young man shouting while holding a plate containing a flame above his head, his sinews and muscles strain at full effort. The flaming plate symbolizes youth taking forth light into the future.

== History ==
The statue was presented by Pertamina for the government of Jakarta to celebrate the 445th anniversary of Jakarta in 1971, at that time headed by Ibnu Sutowo.

The monument was designed by a team of sculptors known as Biro Insinyur Seniman Arsitektur (The Bureau of Engineer Artists Architecture) led by Imam Supardi. Munir Pamuncak was responsible for the construction. Construction of the monument started in July 1971. The construction was scheduled to be finished on October 28, 1971, in time for the celebration of the Youth Pledge Day. However completion was delayed until March 1972.

=== Construction of Jakarta MRT ===
The monument marks the transition between the elevated and the underground structure of the Jakarta Mass Rapid Transit. During the construction of the transition area, cut-and-cover construction of the box culvert tunnel had to commence below the statue. A temporary steel frame structure was built to protect the statue during the digging of the ground below. This protection structure consists of an H-beam kingpost, bracings, angle brackets, and a borepile at the bottom of the kingpost. After the completion of the work, this temporary protection structure was demolished and the ground foundation of the statue refilled on top of the MRT's box culvert tunnel.

== Popular culture ==
English-speaking foreigners call it the "Pizza Man" or "Hot-Hands Harry". Some Indonesians called it "Aduh, Panas" ("Ouch, Hot"). Other nickname for the monument is "Pertamina", referring to the national oil company which takes energy out of the ground and burns it in the air.

== See also ==
- Kebayoran Baru

== Cited works ==
- Litwina Ratri R. (2015). "EVALUASI STRUKTUR PROTEKSI UNDERPINNING PADA PATUNG PEMUDA MEMBANGUN DI AREA TRANSISI PROYEK MRT JAKARTA" [Evaluation of the Protection Underpinning Structure on Patun Pemuda Membangun in the Transition Area of MRT Jakarta Project] (PDF). Electronic Theses & Dissertations - Gadjah Mada University (in Indonesian).
- Merrillees, Scott (2015). Jakarta: Portraits of a Capital 1950-1980. Jakarta: Equinox Publishing. ISBN 9786028397308.
- Nas, Peter J.M. (1993). "1. Jakarta, city full of symbols: An essay in symbolic ecology". In Nas, Peter J.M. (ed.). Urban Symbolism. BRILL. ISBN 9789004098558.
- Pertamina (Persero), PT. (2008). Mutasi DNA powerhouse: Pertamina on the move. Jakarta: Gramedia Pustaka Utama. ISBN 9789792232929.
