= World Trade Center Jakarta =

- Interactive map of the World Trade Center Jakarta area

General information
- Type: Commercial
- Location: Kav-29, Jalan Jenderal Sudirman, Jakarta, Indonesia
- Coordinates: 6.215140°S 106.820515°E
- Current tenants: ABB Group; Permata Bank; Allianz; PriceWaterhouseCoopers; Hanwha Life; Embassies of: Canada; Ecuador; Guatemala; Ireland; Panama
- Construction started: 1984
- Completed: 2017
- Owner: PT Jakarta Land; (Murdaya family and Hongkong Land)

Height
- Antenna spire: 209.1 m
- Roof: 209.1 m
- Top floor: 191.5 m

Technical details
- Floor count: 44 floors x 1; 30 floors x 1; 20 floors x 1; 17 floors x 2

Design and construction
- Architects: Aedas; PT Anggara Architeam
- Developer: PT Jakarta Land
- Structural engineer: Davy Sukamta & Partners Structural Engineers
- Main contractor: Balfour Beatty Sakti

Website
- jakland.com

World Trade Center Jakarta is a complex of commercial high-rise buildings at Jalan Jenderal Sudirman, Jakarta, Indonesia. The buildings of the complex are named as WTC 1, WTC 2, WTC 3, WTC 5 and WTC 6. Total land area of the complex is about 8 hectares (20 acres).

WTC 5 and WTC 6 of the complex was completed in 1985, which were then known as Wisma Metropolitan I and Wisma Metropolitan II. Both buildings are 69 meters (226 ft) high with 18 floors above the ground.

WTC 1 was completed in 1991 and has 20 floors above the ground and 87 meters (285 ft) high. WTC 2 was completed in 2012, which is 160 meters (520 ft) tall and has 32 floors above the ground.

WTC 3 is the tallest building of the complex, which is a 209 meters (686 ft) tall skyscraper with 44 floors above the ground and 5 floors below the ground. The skyscraper topped off in April 2017.

== Gallery ==
The Complex seen from the Sudirman Avenue

WTC 2 Jakarta

== See also ==
- List of tallest buildings in Indonesia
- List of tallest buildings in Jakarta
