= Jalan Jenderal Sudirman =

Road in Jakarta, Indonesia

- Sudirman Avenue
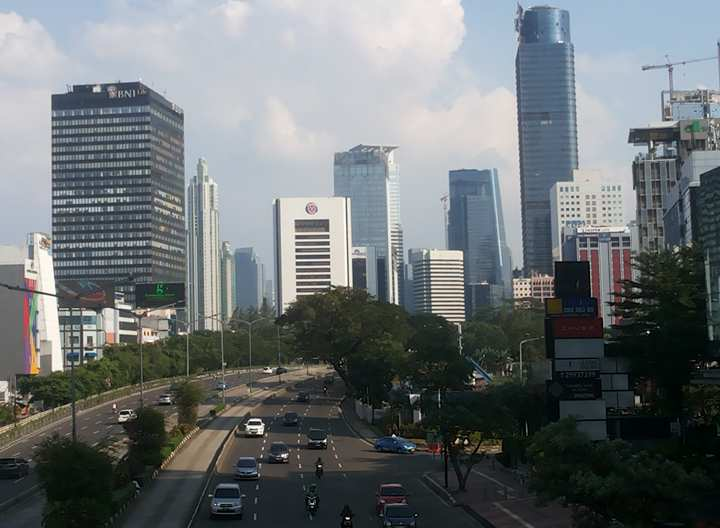
- A view of Jalan Jenderal Sudirman
- Former name: Djalan Raja Djendral Sudirman
- Owner: Government of Special Region of Jakarta
- Maintained by: Office of Public Works (Dinas Pekerjaan Umum) of Special Region of Jakarta
- Length: 4.1 km (2.5 mi)
- Location: South Jakarta and Central Jakarta
- Nearest metro station: Senayan, Istora Mandiri, Bendungan Hilir, Setiabudi Astra
- South end: Patung Pemuda Membangun
- North end: West Flood Canal bridge / Jalan M.H. Thamrin

Jalan Jenderal Sudirman (General Sudirman Avenue) or Jalan Sudirman (Sudirman Avenue) is a major thoroughfare in Jakarta, Indonesia. Named after Indonesian national hero Sudirman, the road runs from Patung Pemuda Membangun at the south end to the bridge of the West Flood Canal to the north, where it meets Jalan M.H. Thamrin. The road had been built between 1949 and 1953 to connect Central Jakarta with Kebayoran Baru, now the road has become the financial center of the country.

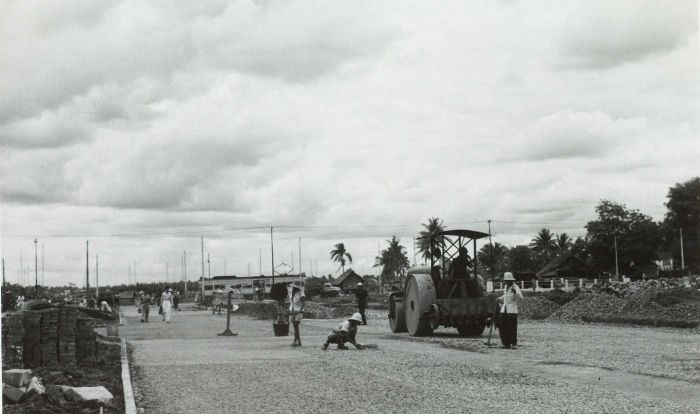
Sudirman Street paving process c. 1950.

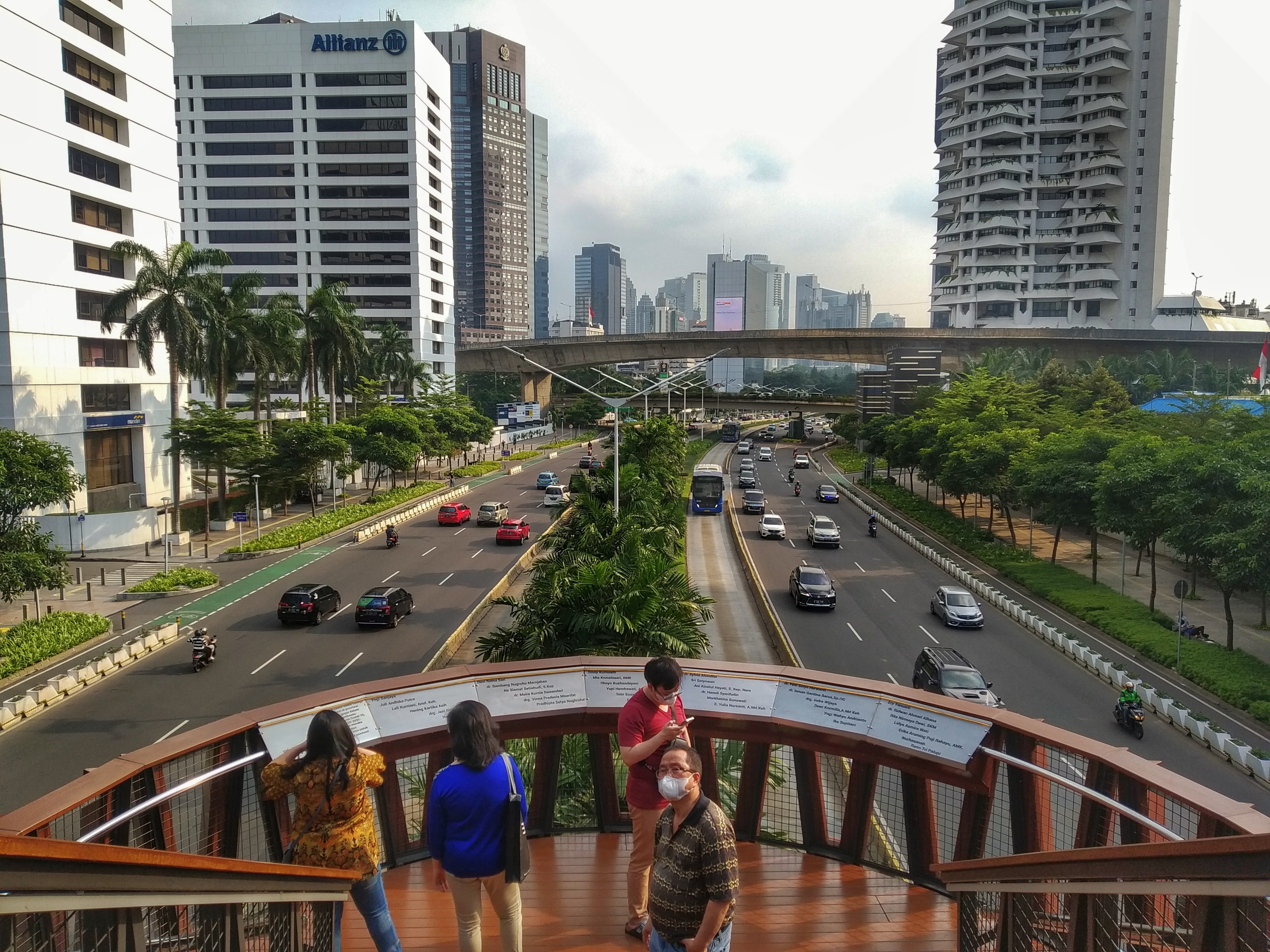
Jalan Sudirman view from the deck of the Karet Sudirman Pinisi Bridge

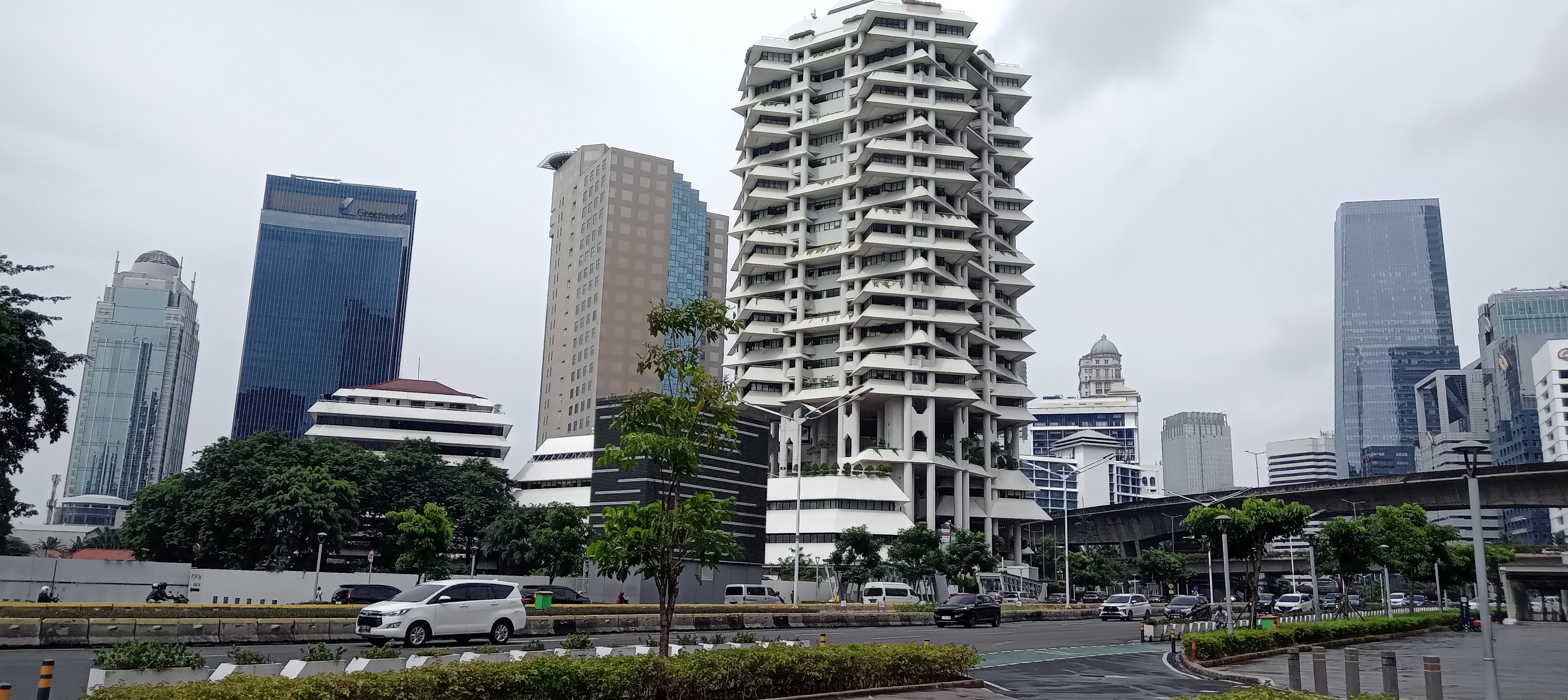
Intiland Tower and view of Jalan Jendral Sudirman

== Transportation ==
A part of Jakarta MRT runs underneath the total length of Jalan Jenderal Sudirman. Four stations of the MRT (Senayan Mastercard, Istora Mandiri, Bendungan Hilir, and Setiabudi Astra) located along this road. Sudirman station of KRL Commuterline, BNI City station of Soekarno–Hatta Airport Rail Link, and Dukuh Atas BNI station of Jabodebek LRT are located at the north end of the road as a part of Dukuh Atas TOD.

There are six stops for the Transjakarta busway along the street, mainly serving Corridor 1. They are:

- Bundaran Senayan, in front of Ratu Plaza
- Senayan Bank DKI, close to gate into Gelora Bung Karno
- Polda Metro Jaya, close to Polda Metro Jaya police headquarters
- Bendungan Hilir, close to Plaza Semanggi and the Semanggi Interchange which connects this street to Jalan Jenderal Gatot Subroto
- Karet, close to World Trade Center Jakarta and Le Méridien Hotel
- Dukuh Atas, close to Wisma 46, in front of Wisma Arthaloka.

== See also ==
- Jalan Gajah Mada and Jalan Hayam Wuruk
- Menteng
- History of Jakarta

== Cited works ==
- Herdruk Topografische Dienst Nederland; Koninklijk Instituut voor de Tropen (1930s). "Jakarta" (Map). Plattegrond van Batavia [Map of Batavia]. 1:20,000 (in Dutch).
- Merrillees, Scott (2015). Jakarta: Portraits of a Capital 1950-1980. Jakarta: Equinox Publishing. ISBN 9786028397308.
