= Citibank Indonesia =

- Company type: Subsidiary
- Industry: Consumer Banking, Commercial Banking, Financial services
- Founded: 1968; 58 years ago
- Parent: Citigroup
- Website: www.citigroup.com/global/about-us/global-presence/indonesia

Citibank Indonesia was the division of Citigroup that operated in Indonesia. In November 2023, the division was sold to United Overseas Bank.

== History ==
On June 14, 1968, Citibank Indonesia was established under the Ministry of Finance Decree No. D.15.6.1.4.23. It began its operations in Hotel Indonesia with an initial staff of 15 employees. In 1986, Citi was the first foreign bank to introduce ATMs in Indonesia. In 1989, Citi was the first foreign bank to introduce credit cards in Indonesia. In 1993, CitiPhone, a 24 hours a day, 7 days a week customer service program was launched. In 2013, Citi launched CitiMobile.

In 2023, United Overseas Bank acquired Citi's consumer business in Malaysia, Indonesia, Thailand, and Vietnam.

== Legal issues ==
On March 23, 2011, police arrested senior relationship manager Inong Malinda Dee who worked in the wealth management division on charges of embezzling $1.9 million from three clients in 2009 and 2010. In April 2011, Bank Indonesia temporarily banned Citibank from taking new customers for its wealth management division. On March 7, 2012, Malinda was convicted of stealing from clients by a three-judge panel and sentenced to eight years in jail, according to a ruling delivered at the South Jakarta district court. On March 29, 2011, Irzen Octa, a small-businessman from Jakarta, was found lying motionless in Citibank's credit card collection department on the fifth floor of the Jamsostek Tower in Jakarta; he had been there to discuss an Rp 48 million principal debt on his Citibank platinum credit card. He was driven to a nearby hospital in a Citibank car, where he was pronounced dead on arrival. Irzen's family alleged that he was assaulted by third-party debt collectors before his death. In June 2012, this charge was rejected by the Jakarta High Court, which went by the results of a prior autopsy that determined that his death was caused by a ruptured blood vessel caused by his chronic hypertension. The court, however, sentenced to five years in prison, three debt collectors implicated in the death of Irzen Octa, annulling a previous sentence of one year each, for depriving Irzen's liberty which ultimately resulted in his death.

Post these two incidents, Bank Indonesia (BI) announced sanctions on Citibank, effective 6 May 2011. These included barring Citibank from issuing credit cards to new customers for two years, prohibiting it from signing up new customers for its premium wealth service for one year, ordering Citibank not to use third-party debt collectors for two years and banning the bank from opening new branches for one year. BI also slapped managerial sanctions in the form of fit-and-proper tests on Citibank executives linked to the cases. It also instructed bank executives not to leave Indonesia until all tests were completed. BI also instructed 23 banks to stop signing up new customers for their priority banking businesses for a month starting May 2, 2011. On April 28, 2011, Citibank announced that it was hiring 1,400 debt collection staff who were previously outsourced.
