= List of diplomatic missions in Jakarta =

This is the list of diplomatic missions based in Jakarta, Indonesia. As the capital city of Indonesia, Jakarta hosts a number of embassies and missions of foreign countries and entities that have established diplomatic relations with Indonesia.

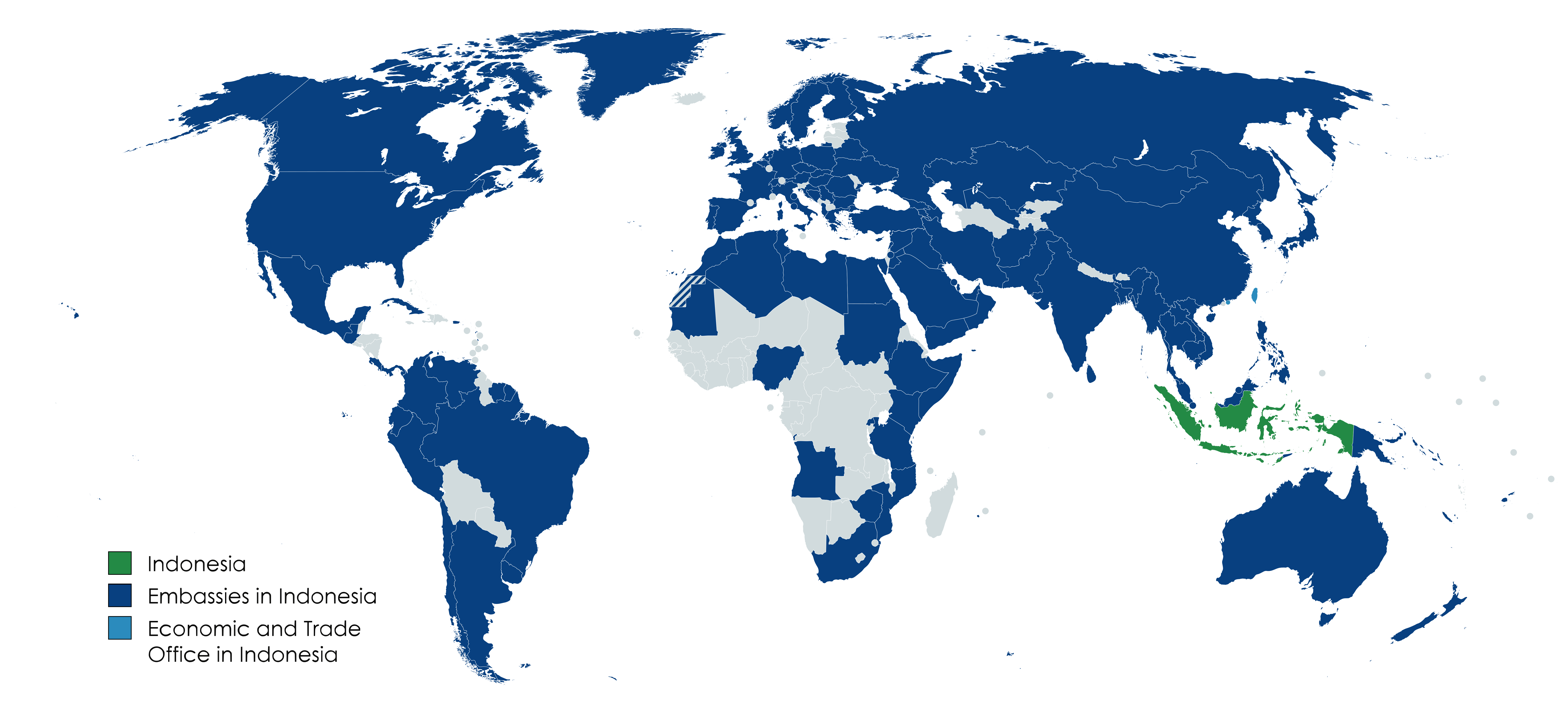
Map of diplomatic missions in Indonesia

Currently, the capital city of Jakarta hosts 109 embassies and several other countries accredit non-resident ambassadors from other capitals. In Jakarta, a large concentration of foreign embassies and missions are clustered around Central Jakarta (Menteng area and across Jalan MH Thamrin), and South Jakarta (across Jalan Jenderal Sudirman, Jalan H.R. Rasuna Said, and Mega Kuningan area).

Jakarta also serves as the official capital and the seat of Association of Southeast Asian Nations (ASEAN) Secretariat. While several countries established dedicated mission to ASEAN in Jakarta, a number of embassies in Jakarta are also accredited as the official mission to ASEAN.

== Embassies ==
Country	Name of Mission	Head of Mission	Address	Ref.
Afghanistan	Embassy of the Islamic Emirate of Afghanistan	Mr. Mawlawi Sadullah Baloch Charge d'affaires A.I	Jl. Dr. Kusuma Atmaja No. 15 Menteng, Central Jakarta 10310
Albania	Embassy of the Republic of Albania	Mr. Nikson Ballço Charge d'affaires A.I	Jl. Jenderal Sudirman Kav. 5-6 Setiabudi, South Jakarta 10220
Algeria	Embassy of the People's Democratic Republic of Algeria	H.E. Mr. Abdelouahab Osmane Ambassador Extraordinary and Plenipotentiary	Jl. H.R. Rasuna Said Kav. 10-11 Setiabudi, South Jakarta 12950
Angola	Embassy of the Republic of Angola	H.E. Mr. Floréncio Mariano da Conceição e Almeida Ambassador Extraordinary and Plenipotentiary	Jl. Kemang Dalam IX Blok H No. 8 RT/RW 005/003 Mampang Prapatan, South Jakarta 12730
Argentina	Embassy of the Argentine Republic	H.E. Mr. Gustavo Ricardo Coppa Ambassador Extraordinary and Plenipotentiary	Menara Thamrin Suite 1705 - 17th floor, Jl. M. H. Thamrin Kav 3 Menteng, Central Jakarta 10250
Armenia	Embassy of the Republic of Armenia	H.E. Mr. Serob Bejanyan Ambassador Extraordinary and Plenipotentiary	Jl. Karang Asem Utara Blok C/4, No. 40 Kuningan Timur, South Jakarta 12950
Australia	Embassy of Australia	H.E. Mr. Roderick Bruce Brazier Ambassador Extraordinary and Plenipotentiary	Jl. H.R. Rasuna Said Kav. C15-16 Setiabudi, South Jakarta 12940
Austria	Embassy of Austria	H.E. Mr. Alexander Rieger Ambassador Extraordinary and Plenipotentiary	Jl. Diponegoro No. 44 Menteng, Central Jakarta 10310
Azerbaijan	Embassy of the Republic of Azerbaijan	H.E. Mr. Ramil Abil oglu Rzayev Ambassador Extraordinary and Plenipotentiary	Jl. Karang Asem Tengah Blok C-5 No. 20 Setiabudi, South Jakarta 12950
Bahrain	Embassy of the Kingdom of Bahrain	H.E. Mr. Ahmed Abdulla Ahmed Alharmasi Alhajeri Ambassador Extraordinary and Plenipotentiary	Jl. Banyumas No. 2 Menteng, Central Jakarta 10310
Bangladesh	Embassy of the People's Republic of Bangladesh	H.E. Mr. Abul Hasan Mridha Ambassador Extraordinary and Plenipotentiary	Jl. Lembang No. 10 Menteng, Central Jakarta 10310
Belarus	Embassy of the Republic of Belarus	H.E. Mr. Raman Ramanouski Ambassador Extraordinary and Plenipotentiary	Jl. Patra Kuningan VII, No. 3 Setiabudi, South Jakarta 12950
Belgium	Embassy of Belgium	H.E. Mr. David Jordens Ambassador Extraordinary and Plenipotentiary	Deutsche Bank Building 16th floor, Jl. Imam Bonjol No. 80 Menteng, Central Jakarta 10310
Bosnia and Herzegovina	Embassy of Bosnia and Herzegovina	H.E. Mr. Armin Limo Ambassador Extraordinary and Plenipotentiary	Menara Imperium 11th floor Suite D2, Jl. H.R. Rasuna Said Kav. 1 Setiabudi, South Jakarta 12980
Brazil	Embassy of the Federative Republic of Brazil	H.E. Mr. George Monteiro Prata Ambassador Extraordinary and Plenipotentiary	Wisma Mulia 2 27th floor, Jl. Jendral Gatot Subroto No 40 Setiabudi, South Jakarta 12930
Brunei	Embassy of Brunei Darussalam	H.E. Mr. Dato Seri Pahlawan Haji Abdul Razak bin Haji Abdul Kadir Ambassador Extraordinary and Plenipotentiary	Jl. Cirebon No. 18 RT.10 / RW.7 Menteng, Central Jakarta 10310
Bulgaria	Embassy of the Republic of Bulgaria	H.E. Ms. Tanya Dimitrova Ambassador Extraordinary and Plenipotentiary	Jl. Imam Bonjol 34-36 Menteng, Central Jakarta 10310
Cambodia	Royal Embassy of Cambodia	H.E. Mr. Tean Samnang Ambassador Extraordinary and Plenipotentiary	Jl. Pejaten Barat No. 41 Mampang Prapatan, South Jakarta
Canada	Embassy of Canada	H.E. Mr. Jess Dutton Ambassador Extraordinary and Plenipotentiary	World Trade Center I 6th floor, Jl. Jenderal Sudirman Kav. 29-31 Setiabudi, South Jakarta 12920
Chile	Embassy of the Republic of Chile	H.E. Mr. Mario Ignacio Artaza Loyola Ambassador Extraordinary and Plenipotentiary	The City Tower Building (TCT) 27th floor, Jl. M.H. Thamrin No. 81 Menteng, Central Jakarta 10310
China	Embassy of the People's Republic of China	H.E. Mr. Wang Lutong Ambassador Extraordinary and Plenipotentiary	Jl. Mega Kuningan No. 2 Mega Kuningan, South Jakarta 12950
Colombia	Embassy of the Republic of Colombia	Mr. Carlos Alberto Dueñas Morales Charge d'affaires A.I	Sentral Plaza Building 12th floor, Jl. Jenderal Sudirman Kav. 47 Setiabudi, South Jakarta 12930
Costa Rica	Embassy of the Republic of Costa Rica	Mr. Francisco José Masís Holdridge Charge d'affaires A.I	Wisma Keiai 7th floor Suite 706, Jl. Jenderal Sudirman Kav. 3 Setiabudi, South Jakarta 10220
Croatia	Embassy of the Republic of Croatia	H.E. Mr. Nebojša Koharović Ambassador Extraordinary and Plenipotentiary	Menara Mulia-Suite 280, Jl. Jendral Gatot Subroto Kav. 9-11 Setiabudi, South Jakarta 12930
Cuba	Embassy of the Republic of Cuba	H.E. Ms. Dagmar González Grau Ambassador Extraordinary and Plenipotentiary	Pondok Indah Office Tower 1 5-501, Jl. Sultan Iskandar Muda Kav. VTA Pondok Indah Kebayoran Lama, South Jakarta 12310
Cyprus	Embassy of the Republic of Cyprus	H.E. Mr. Nikos Panayiotou Ambassador Extraordinary and Plenipotentiary	World Trade Center (WTC) 3, 22nd Fl, Jl. Jenderal Sudirman Kav. 29-31 Setiabudi, South Jakarta 12920
Czechia	Embassy of the Czech Republic	H.E. Mr. Petr Kopřiva Ambassador Extraordinary and Plenipotentiary	Jl. Gereja Theresia 20 Menteng, Central Jakarta 10350
Denmark	Royal Danish Embassy	H.E. Mr. Sten Frimodt Nielsen Ambassador Extraordinary and Plenipotentiary	Menara Rajawali 25th floor, Jl. Dr. Ide Anak Agung Gde Agung Mega Kuningan, South Jakarta 12950
Ecuador	Embassy of Ecuador	H.E. Mr. Luis Guillermo Arellano Jibaja Ambassador Extraordinary and Plenipotentiary	World Trade Center 17th floor, Jl. Jenderal Sudirman Kav. 29-31 Setiabudi, South Jakarta 12920
Egypt	Embassy of the Arab Republic of Egypt	H.E. Mr. Yasser Hassan Farag Elshemy Ambassador Extraordinary and Plenipotentiary	Jl. Teuku Umar No. 68 Menteng, Central Jakarta 10310
Ethiopia	Embassy of the Federal Democratic Republic of Ethiopia	H.E. Mr. Fekadu Beyene Aleka Ambassador Extraordinary and Plenipotentiary	Jl. Patra Kuningan IX No. 3, RT.6/RW.4 Setiabudi, South Jakarta 12950
Fiji	Embassy of the Republic of Fiji	H.E. Mr. Ratu Isoa Delamisi Tikoca Ambassador Extraordinary and Plenipotentiary	Sona Topas Tower floor 5A, Jl. Jenderal Sudirman No. 26 Setiabudi, South Jakarta 12920
Finland	Embassy of Finland	H.E. Ms. Pirjo Suomela-Chowdhury Ambassador Extraordinary and Plenipotentiary	Menara Rajawali 9th floor, Jl. Mega Kuningan Lot 5.1 Mega Kuningan, South Jakarta 12950
France	Embassy of France	H.E. Mr. Fabien Laurent Robert Penone Ambassador Extraordinary and Plenipotentiary	Jl. M.H. Thamrin No. 20 (Access via Jalan Sunda) Menteng, Central Jakarta 10350
Georgia	Embassy of Georgia	H.E. Mr. Tornike Nozadze Ambassador Extraordinary and Plenipotentiary	Jl. Denpasar Barat Blok C6 No. 19 A, RT.8/RW.2 Setiabudi, South Jakarta 12950
Germany	Embassy of the Federal Republic of Germany	H.E. Mr. Ralf Beste Ambassador Extraordinary and Plenipotentiary	Jl. M.H. Thamrin No. 1 Menteng, Central Jakarta 10310
Greece	Embassy of the Hellenic Republic	H.E. Mr. Dimitrios Michalopoulos Ambassador Extraordinary and Plenipotentiary	Plaza 89 12th Floor Suite 1203, Jl. H.R. Rasuna Said Kav X-7 No. 6 Setiabudi, South Jakarta 12950
Guatemala	Embassy of the Republic of Guatemala	H.E. Mr. Manuel Estuardo Roldán Barillas Ambassador Extraordinary and Plenipotentiary	World Trade Center I 16th floor, Jl. Jenderal Sudirman Kav. 29 Setiabudi, South Jakarta 12920
Holy See	Apostolic Nunciature	H.E. Archbishop Walter Erbì Ambassador Extraordinary and Plenipotentiary	Jl. Medan Merdeka Timur No. 18 Gambir, Central Jakarta 10110
Hungary	Embassy of Hungary	H.E. Ms. Lilla Karsay Ambassador Extraordinary and Plenipotentiary	Jl. H.R. Rasuna Said Kav. X/3 Setiabudi, South Jakarta 12940
India	Embassy of India	H.E. Mr. Sandeep Chakravorty Ambassador Extraordinary and Plenipotentiary	Gama Tower 28th floor, Jl. H.R. Rasuna Said Kav. C22 Setiabudi, South Jakarta 12940
Iran	Embassy of the Islamic Republic of Iran	H.E. Mr. Mohammad Boroujerdi Ambassador Extraordinary and Plenipotentiary	Jl. H.O.S. Cokroaminoto, No. 110 Menteng, South Jakarta 12920
Iraq	Embassy of the Republic of Iraq	Ms. Zainab Abdulhadi Al-Hassany Charge d'affaires A.I	Jl. Teuku Umar No. 38 Menteng, Central Jakarta 10350
Ireland	Embassy of Ireland	H.E. Ms. Sharon Ann Lennon Ambassador Extraordinary and Plenipotentiary	World Trade Center (Building 1, 14th floor), Jl. Jenderal Sudirman Kav. 29-31 Setiabudi, South Jakarta 12920
Italy	Embassy of Italy	H.E. Mr. Roberto Colaminè Ambassador Extraordinary and Plenipotentiary	Jl. Diponegoro No. 45 Menteng, Central Jakarta 10310
Japan	Embassy of Japan	H.E. Mr. Atsushi Ueno Ambassador Extraordinary and Plenipotentiary	Jl. M.H. Thamrin No. 24 Menteng, Central Jakarta 10350
Jordan	Embassy of the Hashemite Kingdom of Jordan	H.E. Mr. Sudqi Atallah Abdel Qader Al Omoush Ambassador Extraordinary and Plenipotentiary	Artha Graha Tower 9th Floor, Sudirman Central Business District, Jl. Jenderal Sudirman Kav. 52-53 Kebayoran Baru, South Jakarta 12190
Kazakhstan	Embassy of the Republic of Kazakhstan	H.E. Mr. Serzhan Abdykarimov Ambassador Extraordinary and Plenipotentiary	Jl. Patra Kuningan Raya Blok M7, Kav. 1 Setiabudi, South Jakarta 12950
Kenya	Embassy of the Republic of Kenya	H.E. Mr. Abdirashid Salat Abdille Ambassador Extraordinary and Plenipotentiary	Jl. Karawang No. 4, RT. 3/RW. 4 Menteng, Central Jakarta 10310
Kuwait	Embassy of the State of Kuwait	H.E. Mr. Khalid Jassim Al-Yassin Ambassador Extraordinary and Plenipotentiary	Jl. Mega Kuningan Barat III Kav. 16/17 Mega Kuningan, South Jakarta 12950
Laos	Embassy of the Lao People's Democratic Republic	H.E. Mr. Khamfeuang Phanthaxay Ambassador Extraordinary and Plenipotentiary	Jl. Patra Kuningan XIV No. 1A Setiabudi, South Jakarta 12950
Lebanon	Embassy of the Republic of Lebanon	H.E. Mr. Salam Al Achkar Ambassador Extraordinary and Plenipotentiary	Jl. YBR V, No. 82 Setiabudi, South Jakarta 12950
Libya	Embassy of the State of Libya	H.E. Mr. Zakarya Muhammad Mustafa El-Moghrabi Ambassador Extraordinary and Plenipotentiary	Jl. Kintamani Raya II Blok C/17 Kav. 6-7 Kuningan Timur, Setiabudi, South Jakarta 12950
Malaysia	Embassy of Malaysia	H.E. Mr. Muzafar Shah Mustafa Ambassador Extraordinary and Plenipotentiary	Jl. H.R. Rasuna Said Kav. X/6 No. 1-3 Setiabudi, South Jakarta 12940
Mauritania	Embassy of the Islamic Republic of Mauritania	Vacant	23rd Floor Gedung Artha Graha, Sudirman Central Business District, Jl. Jenderal Sudirman Kav. 52-53 Kebayoran Baru, South Jakarta 12190
Mexico	Embassy of Mexico	H.E. Mr. Francisco de la Torre Galindo Ambassador Extraordinary and Plenipotentiary	The East Floor 11 Unit 1, Jl. Dr. Ide Anak Agung Gde Agung Setiabudi, South Jakarta 12950
Mongolia	Embassy of Mongolia	H.E. Mr. Enkhtaivan Dashnyam Ambassador Extraordinary and Plenipotentiary	Sampoerna Strategic Square, South Tower, Level 21, Jl. Jenderal Sudirman Kav. 45-46 Setiabudi, South Jakarta 12930
Morocco	Embassy of the Kingdom of Morocco	H.E. Mr. Redouane Houssaini Ambassador Extraordinary and Plenipotentiary	Jl. Denpasar Raya Blok A13 Kav. 1 Setiabudi, South Jakarta 12950
Mozambique	Embassy of the Republic of Mozambique	H.E. Mr. António Rodrigues José Ambassador Extraordinary and Plenipotentiary	Menara Sudirman 14th Floor, Jl. Jenderal Sudirman Kav.60 RT.5/RW. 03 Kebayoran Baru, South Jakarta 12190
Myanmar	Embassy of the Republic of the Union of Myanmar	Mr. U Mang Hau Thang Charge d'affaires A.I	Jl. H. Agus Salim No. 109 Menteng, Central Jakarta 10350
Netherlands	Embassy of the Kingdom of the Netherlands	H.E. Mr. Marc Gerritsen Ambassador Extraordinary and Plenipotentiary	Jl. H.R. Rasuna Said Kav. S-3 Setiabudi, South Jakarta 12950
New Zealand	Embassy of New Zealand	H.E. Mr. Philip Nathan Taula Ambassador Extraordinary and Plenipotentiary	Jl. Asia Afrika No 8, Gelora Bung Karno Senayan, Central Jakarta 10270
Nigeria	Embassy of the Federal Republic of Nigeria	Ms. Patricia Ene Alechenu Charge d'affaires A.I	Jl. Taman Patra XIV No. 11-11A, Kuningan Timur P.O. Box 3649 Setiabudi, South Jakarta 12950
North Korea	Embassy of the Democratic People's Republic of Korea	H.E. Mr. Hong Kwang-Il Ambassador Extraordinary and Plenipotentiary	Jl. Sumenep RT.1/RW.6 Menteng, Central Jakarta 10310
Norway	Royal Norwegian Embassy	H.E. Ms. Kaja Glomm Ambassador Extraordinary and Plenipotentiary	Menara Rajawali Building 20th floor, Jl. Dr. Ide Anak Agung Gde Agung Mega Kuningan, South Jakarta 12950
Oman	Embassy of the Sultanate of Oman	H.E. Mr. Mohamed Ahmed Salim Alshanfari Ambassador Extraordinary and Plenipotentiary	Jl. Latuharhari Raya No. 12 Menteng, Central Jakarta 10310
Pakistan	Embassy of the Islamic Republic of Pakistan	H.E. Mr. Zahid Hafeez Chaudhri Ambassador Extraordinary and Plenipotentiary	Jl. Mega Kuningan Barat Blok E.3.9, Kav. 5-8 Mega Kuningan, South Jakarta 12950
Palestine	Embassy of the State of Palestine	H.E. Mr. Abdalfatah Ahmed Khalil Alsattari Ambassador Extraordinary and Plenipotentiary	Jl. Ki Mangunsarkoro No. 64 Menteng, Central Jakarta 10310
Panama	Embassy of the Republic of Panama	H.E. Mr. Bernardo César Brea Rodríguez Ambassador Extraordinary and Plenipotentiary	World Trade Center Building 13th floor, Jl. Jenderal Sudirman Kav. 29-31 Setiabudi, South Jakarta 12920
Papua New Guinea	Embassy of the Independent State of Papua New Guinea	H.E. Mr. Simon Wallace Namis Ambassador Extraordinary and Plenipotentiary	Panin Bank Centre 6th floor, Jl. Jenderal Sudirman No. 1 Tanah Abang, Central Jakarta 10270
Peru	Embassy of Peru	H.E. Mr. Luis Raúl Tsuboyama Galván Ambassador Extraordinary and Plenipotentiary	Menara Rajawali 12th floor, Jl. Dr. Ide Anak Agung Gde Agung Lot # 5.1 Mega Kuningan, South Jakarta 12950
Philippines	Embassy of the Republic of the Philippines	H.E. Mr. Christopher Baltazar Montero Ambassador Extraordinary and Plenipotentiary	Jl. Imam Bonjol No. 8 Menteng, Central Jakarta 10310
Poland	Embassy of the Republic of Poland	H.E. Ms. Barbara Magda Szymanowska Ambassador Extraordinary and Plenipotentiary	Jl. H.R. Rasuna Said Kav X Blok IV/3 Setiabudi, South Jakarta 12950
Portugal	Embassy of Portugal	H.E. Ms. Maria Gabriela Vieira Soares de Albergaria Ambassador Extraordinary and Plenipotentiary	Jl. Indramayu No. 2A Menteng, Central Jakarta 10310
Qatar	Embassy of the State of Qatar	H.E. Mr. Sultan bin Mubarak Saad Al-Dosari Ambassador Extraordinary and Plenipotentiary	Jl. Dr. Ide Anak Agung Gde Agung, Blok E 2.3 No.4 Mega Kuningan, South Jakarta 12950
Romania	Embassy of Romania	H.E. Mr. Dan Adrian Bălănescu Ambassador Extraordinary and Plenipotentiary	Jl. Teuku Cik Ditiro No. 42A Menteng, Central Jakarta 10310
Russia	Embassy of the Russian Federation	H.E. Mr. Sergei Gennadievich Tolchenov Ambassador Extraordinary and Plenipotentiary	Jl. H.R. Rasuna Said, Kav. X-7, 1-2 Setiabudi, South Jakarta 12940
Rwanda	Embassy of the Republic of Rwanda	H.E. Mr. Abdul Karim Harerimana Ambassador Extraordinary and Plenipotentiary	Jl. Cianjur No. 15 Menteng, Central Jakarta 10310
San Marino	Embassy of the Republic of San Marino	H.E. Mr. Massimo Ferdinandi Ambassador Extraordinary and Plenipotentiary	Tokopedia Tower 35th floor, Jl. Prof. Dr. Satrio Kav. 11 Karet Semanggi, Setiabudi, South Jakarta 12950
Saudi Arabia	Royal Embassy of Saudi Arabia	H.E. Mr. Faisal bin Abdullah H. Amodi Ambassador Extraordinary and Plenipotentiary	Jl. H.R. Rasuna Said, Kav. B-3 Setiabudi, South Jakarta 12620
Serbia	Embassy of the Republic of Serbia	H.E. Ms. Ivana Golubović-Duboka Ambassador Extraordinary and Plenipotentiary	Jl. H.O.S. Cokroaminoto No. 110 Menteng, Central Jakarta 10310
Singapore	Embassy of the Republic of Singapore	H.E. Mr. Kwok Fook Seng Ambassador Extraordinary and Plenipotentiary	Jl. H.R. Rasuna Said, Kav. 2 Blok X/4 Setiabudi, South Jakarta 12950
Slovakia	Embassy of the Slovak Republic	H.E. Mr. Tomáš Ferko Ambassador Extraordinary and Plenipotentiary	Jl. Profesor Mohammad Yamin No. 29 Menteng, Central Jakarta 10310
Solomon Islands	Embassy of the Solomon Islands	H.E. Ms. Gladys Kamia Isihanua Ambassador Extraordinary and Plenipotentiary	Sahid Sudirman Center 11th floor Suite A, Amethyst Executive Suites, Jl. Jenderal Sudirman No. 86 Tanah Abang, Central Jakarta 10220
Somalia	Embassy of the Federal Republic of Somalia	H.E. Mr. Faysal Ahmed Salad Ambassador Extraordinary and Plenipotentiary	88 Kasablanka Office Tower, Floor 27 Unit G, Jl. Raya Casablanca Kav. 88 Tebet, South Jakarta 12870
South Africa	Embassy of the Republic of South Africa	H.E. Mr. Mpetjane Kgaogelo Lekgoro Ambassador Extraordinary and Plenipotentiary	Suite 705, Wisma GKBI 7th floor, Jl. Jenderal Sudirman No. 28 Tanah Abang, Central Jakarta 10210
South Korea	Embassy of the Republic of Korea	H.E. Mr. Yoon Soon-gu Ambassador Extraordinary and Plenipotentiary	Jl. Jenderal Gatot Subroto Kav. 57 Setiabudi, South Jakarta 12950
Spain	Embassy of the Kingdom of Spain	H.E. Mr. Bernardo de Sicart Escoda Ambassador Extraordinary and Plenipotentiary	Jl. H. Agus Salim No. 61 Gondangdia Menteng, Central Jakarta 10350
Sri Lanka	Embassy of the Democratic Socialist Republic of Sri Lanka	H.E. Ms. Sumadhurika Sashikala Premawardhane Ambassador Extraordinary and Plenipotentiary	Jl. Diponegoro No. 70 Menteng, Central Jakarta 10320
Sudan	Embassy of the Republic of the Sudan	H.E. Mr. Yassir Mohamed Ali Mohammed Ambassador Extraordinary and Plenipotentiary	Jl. Patra Kuningan VII No. 14, RT.6/RW.4, Kuningan Timur Setiabudi, South Jakarta 12950
Suriname	Embassy of the Republic of Suriname	H.E. Mr. Andy Jozua Soenarijo Atmodimedjo Ambassador Extraordinary and Plenipotentiary	Jl. Padalarang No. 09 Menteng, Central Jakarta 10310
Sweden	Embassy of Sweden	H.E. Mr. Daniel Blockert Ambassador Extraordinary and Plenipotentiary	Menara Rajawali 9th floor, Jl. Dr. Ide Anak Agung Gde Agung Lot 5.1 Mega Kuningan, South Jakarta 12950
Switzerland	Embassy of Switzerland	H.E. Mr. Konstantin Obolensky Ambassador Extraordinary and Plenipotentiary	Jl. H.R. Rasuna Said Blok X/32, Kuningan Setiabudi, South Jakarta 12950
Syria	Embassy of the Syrian Arab Republic	H.E. Mr. Abdulmonem Annan Ambassador Extraordinary and Plenipotentiary	Jl. Karangasem I No. 8 Setiabudi, South Jakarta 12950
Tanzania	Embassy of the United Republic of Tanzania	H.E. Mr. Macocha Moshe Tembele Ambassador Extraordinary and Plenipotentiary	Jl. Iskandarsyah II No. 89A, RW.01, Kelurahan Melawai Kebayoran Baru, South Jakarta 12160
Thailand	Royal Thai Embassy	H.E. Mr. Prapan Disyatat Ambassador Extraordinary and Plenipotentiary	Jl. Dr. Ide Anak Agung Gde Agung Kav. E3.3 No. 3 (Lot 8.8) Mega Kuningan, South Jakarta 12950
Timor-Leste	Embassy of the Democratic Republic of Timor-Leste	H.E. Mr. Roberto Sarmento de Oliveira Soares Ambassador Extraordinary and Plenipotentiary	Mayapada Tower, 19th Floor, Jl. Jl. Jend Sudirman Kav. 28 Setiabudi, South Jakarta 12920
Tunisia	Embassy of the Republic of Tunisia	H.E. Mr. Mohamed Trabelsi Ambassador Extraordinary and Plenipotentiary	Jl. Karang Asem Tengah Blok C5 No. 21 Setiabudi, South Jakarta 12950
Turkey	Embassy of the Republic of Türkiye	H.E. Mr. Talip Küçükcan Ambassador Extraordinary and Plenipotentiary	Jl. H.R. Rasuna Said, Kav. 1 Setiabudi, South Jakarta 12950
Ukraine	Embassy of Ukraine	Ms. Yevhenia Shynkarenko Charge d'affaires A.I	Generali Tower – Gran Rubina Business Park 16th floor, Jl. H.R. Rasuna Said RT. 1/RW. 5 Setiabudi, South Jakarta 12940
United Arab Emirates	Embassy of the United Arab Emirates	H.E. Mr. Abdulla Salem Obaid Salem Al Dhaheri Ambassador Extraordinary and Plenipotentiary	Jl. Prof. Dr. Satrio Blok C4 Kav 16-17 Setiabudi, South Jakarta 12950
United Kingdom	His Britannic Majesty's Embassy	H.E. Mr. Dominic James Robert Jermey Ambassador Extraordinary and Plenipotentiary	Jl. Patra Kuningan Raya Blok L5-6 Setiabudi, South Jakarta 12950
United States	Embassy of the United States of America	Ms. Joy Michiko Sakurai Charge d'affaires A.I	Jl. Medan Merdeka Selatan No. 3-5 Gambir, Central Jakarta 10110
Uruguay	Embassy of the Oriental Republic of Uruguay	H.E. Ms. Cristina González Ambassador Extraordinary and Plenipotentiary	Noble House Building - 33rd Floor, Jl. Dr. Ide Anak Agung Gde Agung Kav. E.4.2 Nr.2 Mega Kuningan, South Jakarta 12950
Uzbekistan	Embassy of the Republic of Uzbekistan	H.E. Mr. Oybek Eshonov Ambassador Extraordinary and Plenipotentiary	Jl. Sriwijaya Raya No. 30 Kebayoran Baru, South Jakarta 12110
Venezuela	Embassy of the Bolivarian Republic of Venezuela	H.E. Mr. Enrique Antonio Acuña Mendoza Ambassador Extraordinary and Plenipotentiary	Plaza Kuningan, North Tower, Suite 302, 3rd floor, Jl. H.R. Rasuna Said Kav. C 11-14 Setiabudi, South Jakarta 12940
Vietnam	Embassy of the Socialist Republic of Vietnam	H.E. Mr. Ta Van Thong Ambassador Extraordinary and Plenipotentiary	Jl. Teuku Umar No. 25 Menteng, Central Jakarta 10350
Yemen	Embassy of the Republic of Yemen	H.E. Mr. Salem Ahmed Balfakeeh Ambassador Extraordinary and Plenipotentiary	Jl. Latuharhary No. 16 Menteng, Central Jakarta 10310
Zimbabwe	Embassy of the Republic of Zimbabwe	H.E. Mr. Martin Makururu Ambassador Extraordinary and Plenipotentiary	Jl. Patra Kuningan VII No. 15 Setiabudi, South Jakarta 12950

== Missions to the Association of Southeast Asian Nations (ASEAN) ==
Country/Organization	Name of Mission	Head of Mission	Address	Ref.
Australia	Australian Mission to ASEAN	H.E. Ms. Tiffany Anne McDonald Ambassador Extraordinary and Plenipotentiary	Jl. Patra Kuningan Raya Kav. 1-4 Setiabudi, South Jakarta 12950
Brazil	Mission of Brazil to ASEAN	H.E. Mr. Henrique Archanjo Ferraro Ambassador Extraordinary and Plenipotentiary	Wisma Mulia 2 27th floor, Jl. Jendral Gatot Subroto No 40 Setiabudi, South Jakarta 12930
Brunei	Permanent Mission of Brunei Darussalam to ASEAN	H.E. Ms. Latifah binti Zaini Ambassador Extraordinary and Plenipotentiary	Jl. Ciasem IV, No. 4 Kebayoran Baru, South Jakarta 12180
Cambodia	Permanent Mission of the Kingdom of Cambodia to ASEAN	H.E. Mr. Noy Choumneanh Ambassador Extraordinary and Plenipotentiary	Jl. Brawijaya VI No. 69 Kebayoran Baru, South Jakarta 12160
Canada	Mission of Canada to ASEAN	H.E. Ms. Ambra Dickie Ambassador Extraordinary and Plenipotentiary	World Trade Centre I 6th Floor, Jl. Jenderal Sudirman Kav. 29-31 Setiabudi, South Jakarta 12920
China	Mission of the People's Republic of China to ASEAN	H.E. Mr. Wang Qing Ambassador Extraordinary and Plenipotentiary	The East Building 32nd floor, Jl. Lingkar Mega Kuningan Blok E3.2 Kav. 1 Setiabudi, South Jakarta 12950
European Union	Delegation of the European Union to ASEAN	H.E. Mr. Sujiro Seam Ambassador Extraordinary and Plenipotentiary	Menara Astra 38th floor, Jl. Jenderal Sudirman 5-6 Tanah Abang, Central Jakarta 10220
India	Indian Mission to ASEAN	H.E. Mr. Shri Srinivas Gotru Ambassador Extraordinary and Plenipotentiary	Jl. Patra Kuningan XII No.3 Setiabudi, South Jakarta 12950
Indonesia	Permanent Mission of the Republic of Indonesia to ASEAN	H.E. Mr. Mohammad Iskandarsyah Derry Aman Ambassador Extraordinary and Plenipotentiary	Jl. Sisingamangaraja No. 73 Kebayoran Baru, South Jakarta 12120
Japan	Mission of Japan to ASEAN	H.E. Mr. Koji Yonetani Ambassador Extraordinary and Plenipotentiary	Jl. M.H. Thamrin No. 24 Menteng, Central Jakarta 10350
Laos	Permanent Mission of Lao PDR to ASEAN	H.E. Mr. Sitsangkhom Sisaketh Ambassador Extraordinary and Plenipotentiary	Jl. Pati Unus No.12, Blok F/4 Kebayoran Baru, South Jakarta
Malaysia	Permanent Mission of Malaysia to ASEAN	H.E. Ms. Sarah Al Bakri Devadason Ambassador Extraordinary and Plenipotentiary	Jl. H.R. Rasuna Said No. 1-3 Kav X/6 Setiabudi, South Jakarta 12950
Myanmar	Permanent Mission of the Republic of the Union of Myanmar to ASEAN	Mr. Mang Hau Tang Charge d'affaires A.I	Jl. Prapanca IV, No. 61 RT004/RW003 Kebayoran Baru, South Jakarta 12110
New Zealand	New Zealand Mission to ASEAN	H.E. Ms. Joanna Jane Anderson Ambassador Extraordinary and Plenipotentiary	Jl. Asia Afrika No. 8, Gelora Bung Karno Tanah Abang, Central Jakarta 10270
Philippines	Permanent Mission of the Republic of the Philippines to ASEAN	H.E. Ms. Evangeline Tiu Ong Jimenez-Ducrocq Ambassador Extraordinary and Plenipotentiary	Jl. Wijaya XVI No. 3-5, Melawai Kebayoran Baru, South Jakarta 12110
Russia	Mission of the Russian Federation to ASEAN	H.E. Mr. Evgeny Zagaynov Ambassador Extraordinary and Plenipotentiary	Jl. H.R. Rasuna Said, Kav. X-7, 1-2 Setiabudi, South Jakarta 12940
Singapore	Permanent Mission of the Republic of Singapore to ASEAN	H.E. Mr. Gerard Ho Wei Hong Ambassador Extraordinary and Plenipotentiary	Jl. H.R. Rasuna Said, Kav. 2 Block X/4 Setiabudi, South Jakarta 12950
South Korea	Mission of the Republic of Korea to ASEAN	H.E. Mr. Lee Chul Ambassador Extraordinary and Plenipotentiary	Sentral Senayan II 23F, Jl. Asia Afrika No. 8, Gelora Bung Karno Tanah Abang, Central Jakarta 10270
Thailand	Permanent Mission of the Kingdom of Thailand to ASEAN	H.E. Ms. Prinat Apirat Ambassador Extraordinary and Plenipotentiary	Jl. Imam Bonjol No. 74 Menteng, Central Jakarta 10310
Timor-Leste	Permanent Mission of Timor-Leste to ASEAN	H.E. Ms. Elisa Maria da Silva Ambassador Extraordinary and Plenipotentiary	Atrium Mulia Suite 502, Jl. H.R. Rasuna Said Kav. B10-11 Setiabudi, South Jakarta 12910
United Arab Emirates	UAE Mission to ASEAN	H.E. Mr. Mohamed Ahmed Mohamed Bandouq Al Qamzi Ambassador Extraordinary and Plenipotentiary	Jl. Prof. Dr. Satrio Blok C4 Kav 16-17 Setiabudi, South Jakarta 12950
United Kingdom	UK Mission to ASEAN	H.E. Ms. Helen Mary Fazey Ambassador Extraordinary and Plenipotentiary	Jl. Patra Kuningan Raya Blok L5-6 Setiabudi, South Jakarta 12950
United States	US Mission to ASEAN	H.E. Mr. Kevin Kim Ambassador Extraordinary and Plenipotentiary	Jl. Medan Merdeka Selatan No. 3-5 Gambir, Central Jakarta 10110
Vietnam	Permanent Mission of the Socialist Republic of Viet Nam to ASEAN	H.E. Ms. Ton Thi Ngoc Huong Ambassador Extraordinary and Plenipotentiary	Jl. Pekalongan No. 9 Menteng, Central Jakarta 10310

== Other Missions ==
Entity/Organization	Name of Mission	Head of Mission	Address	Ref.
European Union	Delegation of the European Union to Indonesia and Brunei Darussalam	H.E. Mr. Hervé Delphin Ambassador Extraordinary and Plenipotentiary	Menara Astra 38th floor, Jl. Jenderal Sudirman 5-6 Tanah Abang, Central Jakarta 10220
Hong Kong	Hong Kong Economic & Trade Office	Ms. Cheng Ching Mon, Libera Director-General	Level 19 World Trade Centre 2, Jl. Jenderal Sudirman Kav. 29-31 Setiabudi, South Jakarta 12920
Taiwan	Taipei Economic and Trade Office, Jakarta, Indonesia	Mr. Bruce Hung Representative of Taipei Economic and Trade Office in Indonesia	Gedung Artha Graha Lt. 17, Jl. Jenderal Sudirman Kav. 52-53 Kebayoran Baru, South Jakarta 12190
United Nations	The UN Resident Coordinator Office	Ms. Gita Sabharwal UN Resident Coordinator in Indonesia	Menara Thamrin Lt. 7, Jl. MH Thamrin Kav. 3 Menteng, Central Jakarta 10250

== See also ==
- List of diplomatic missions in Indonesia
