= Mega Kuningan =

Business district in South Jakarta, Indonesia

- Business district
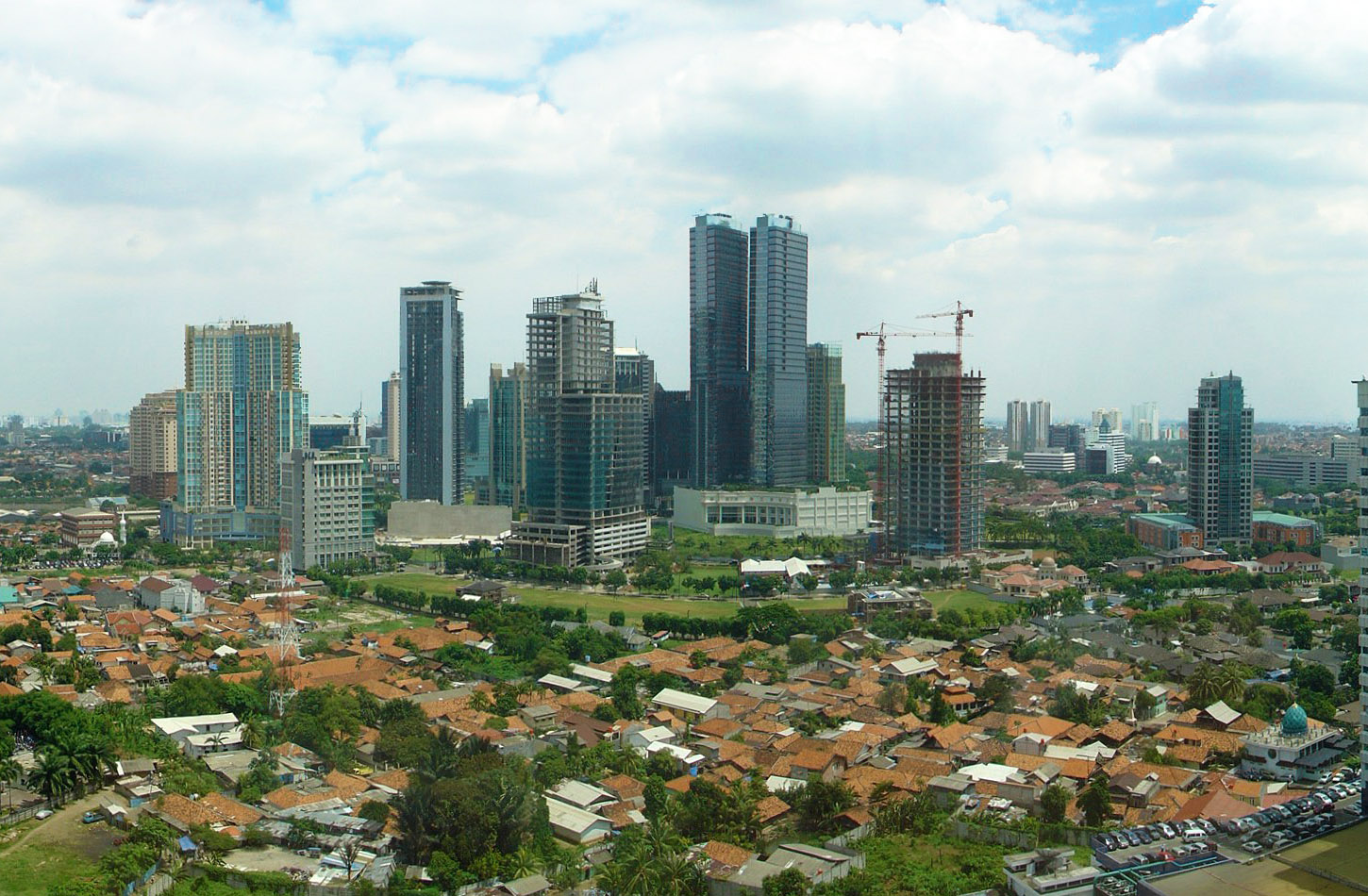
- The view of Mega Kuningan in 2007
- Interactive map of Mega Kuningan
- Coordinates: 6.230730°S 106.825680°E
- Country: Indonesia
- City: Jakarta
- Metro: Jakarta
- Named for: Kuningan Regency

Area
  - Total: 0.54 km^{2} (0.21 sq mi)

Languages
  - Official: Indonesian & English
- Time zone: UTC+07:00 (WIB)
- Postal code: 12950

Mega Kuningan is a business district with an integrated mixed use development concept, located at Setiabudi sub-district in Jakarta, Indonesia. The CBD is surrounded by some of the main roads in Jakarta (Jalan Sudirman, Jalan Gatot Subroto, Jalan Rasuna Said, Jalan Satrio), and is located within the Golden Triangle of Jakarta.

Mega Kuningan was developed as an integrated diplomatic and business area equipped with international standard infrastructure and utility networks. In addition to commercial property, there are also embassies of several countries. Mega Kuningan is divided into eight large blocks, which are subdivided into 44 sub-blocks.

== History ==
This area began its history in 1990, when Rajawali Nusantara Indonesia (RNI) received a fund from the government in the form of an area of 311,930 square meters in East Kuningan, Setiabudi, South Jakarta, which was previously managed by the Indonesian Ministry of Finance. RNI then established a joint venture company with PT Abadi Guna Papan to develop the land into this area. The cattle farm located on the land was also moved to another land in Pondok Ranggon, Cipayung, East Jakarta which was also handed over by the government to RNI.

== Important buildings ==
Mega Kuningan Skyline.

The embassies of China, Kuwait, Mongolia, Pakistan, Qatar, and Thailand are located in Mega Kuningan. The area and its surrounding also hosts many other embassies, diplomatic missions, and official residence of ambassadors. Mega Kuningan area is also the location of Ciputra World Jakarta, a mixed development complex consists of an upscale shopping mall, apartments, office tower, and a five star property of Raffles Hotels & Resorts. There are offices of many local and multinational companies within Mega Kuningan. Those Important buildings in the area include:

- World Capital Tower
- BTPN Towers
- Ritz-Carlton Jakarta Mega Kuningan
- JW Marriott Jakarta
- Embassies of
  - Armenia
  - Bangladesh
  - China
  - Georgia
  - Kazakhstan
  - Kuwait
  - Libya
  - Lebanon
  - Morocco
  - Mongolia
  - Mozambique
  - Nigeria
  - Pakistan
  - Qatar
  - Syria
  - Thailand
  - Tunisia
- Bellagio Mansion
- Oakwood Premiere Cozmo Mega Kuningan
- Noble House
  - Embassy of Uruguay (33rd floor)
- Menara Prima 1
- Menara Sunlife (Menara Prima 2)
- Menara Dea I
- Menara Dea II
- Menara Rajawali
  - Head office of Rajawali Corpora
  - Embassies of:
    - Denmark (25th floor)
    - Finland (9th floor)
    - Norway (20th floor)
    - Peru (12th floor)
    - Sweden (9th floor)
- The Hundred
- The East Tower
  - Embassy of Mexico (11th floor)
- Plaza Mutiara
- RDTX Tower
- Satrio Tower
- Somerset Grand Citra
- Best Western Mega Kuningan
- Branz Mega Kuningan
- Pollux Sky Suites
- Mega Kuningan Office Parks
- Sopo Del Tower
- Verde Two Complex
- Diamond Tower Mega Kuningan

== Transportation access ==
The Mega Kuningan can be accessed from the main gate on Jalan Professor Dr. Satrio in the north and from Jalan HR Rasuna Said in the east.

=== Bus routes ===
==== Transjakarta ====
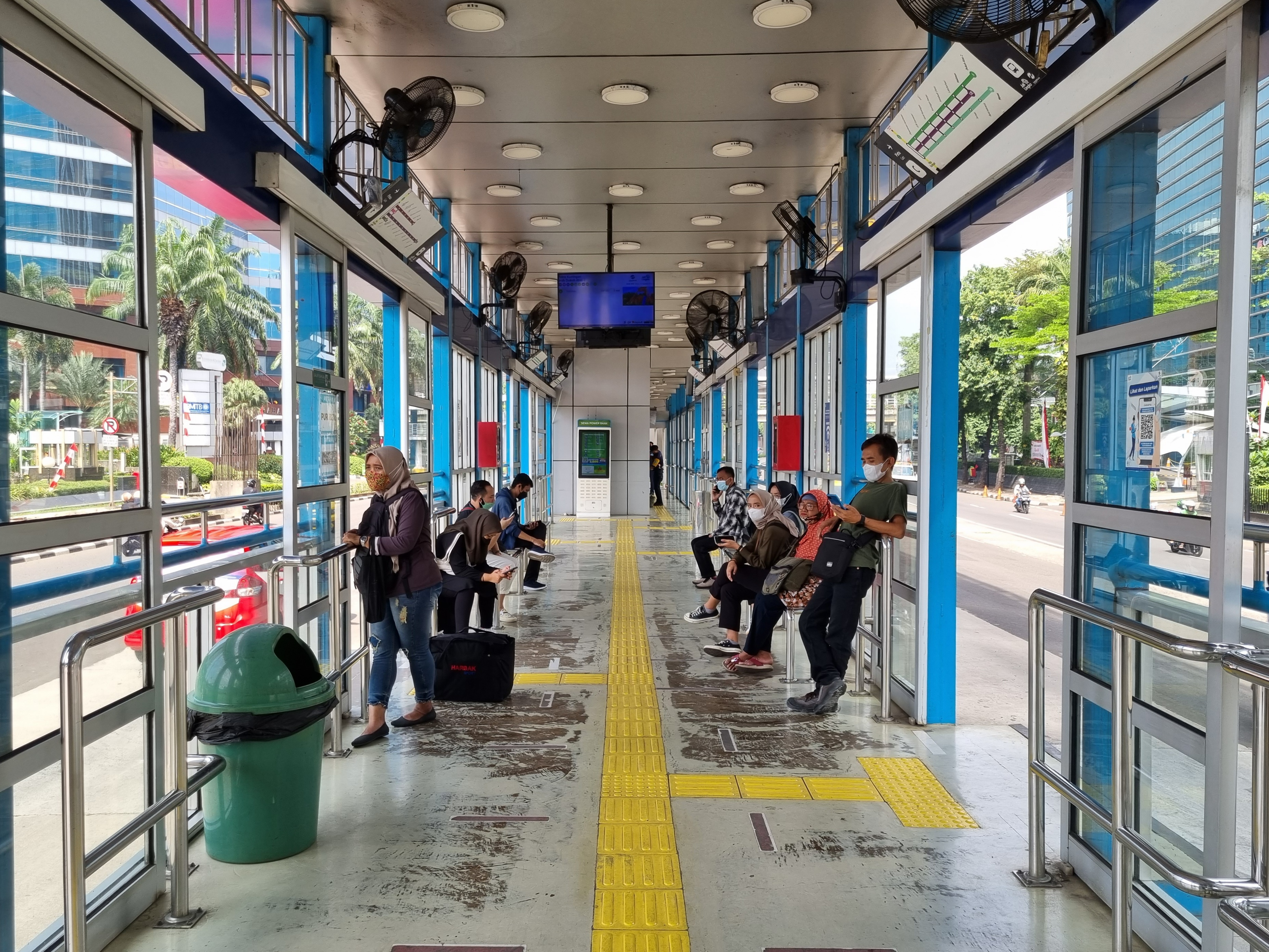
The Patra Kuningan Transjakarta BRT station on the HR Rasuna Said Street east of Mega Kuningan

The Mega Kuningan can be reached by various modes of transportation, such as Transjakarta bus rapid transit (BRT) network which passes through Jalan HR Rasuna Said and Jalan Professor Dr. Satrio. The following list is the TransJakarta route that passes through the area around Mega Kuningan:

- BRT corridors
  - Corridor Pulo Gadung – Patra Kuningan
  - Corridor Ragunan – Galunggung
  - Corridor Ragunan – Balai Kota via Kuningan
  - Corridor Puri Beta – Flyover Kuningan (express service, only on weekdays)
  - Corridor Puri Beta – Flyover Kuningan (only on weekends)
- Non-BRT feeder routes
  - Corridor 6C Tebet Station – Kuningan
  - Corridor 6D Tebet Station – Bundaran Senayan
  - Corridor 6H Lebak Bulus – Senen
  - Corridor 6K Patra Kuningan – Karet
  - Corridor 6M Manggarai Station – Blok M
- Royaltrans (premium feeder service)
  - 6P Cibubur Junction – Kuningan
  - B13 Summarecon Bekasi – Kuningan
  - D31 South City Cinere – Kuningan

==== Other buses ====
- Sinar Jaya AC149 Tanah Abang-Bekasi (via KH Mas Mansyur - Prof. dr. Satrio - Kp. Melayu - UKI - Bulak Kapal)
- Mikrolet M44 Kampung Melayu-Karet (via Tebet - Casablanca - Prof. dr. Satrio)

=== Rail transport ===
The area is also served by both Cibubur and Bekasi lines of the Jabodebek LRT at the Kuningan LRT Station at Jalan HR Rasuna Said.

== Incidents ==
Mega Kuningan was affected by terrorist attacks, first on 5 August 2003 at the JW Marriott Hotel and the second time on 17 July 2009 at the JW Marriott and Ritz-Carlton Hotels.

== See also ==
- Rajawali Corpora
- Central business district
- Golden Triangle of Jakarta
- JW Marriott Jakarta
- World Capital Tower
- BTPN Towers
