= Jalan Prof. Dr. Satrio =

Street in Jakarta, Indonesia

Coordinates: 6.22347°S 106.82447°E

- Jalan Profesor Dokter Satrio
- Interactive map of Jalan Prof. Dr. Satrio
- Owner: Pemprov DKI Jakarta
- Maintained by: Dinas Pekerjaan Umum DKI Jakarta
- Length: 2.25 km (1.40 mi)
- Location: South Jakarta and Central Jakarta
- North-West end: Karet Sudirman, Tanah Abang, Central Jakarta
- South end: Terowongan Casablanca, South Jakarta

Jalan Prof. Dr. Satrio or Jalan Satrio is one of main streets of Jakarta, Indonesia. The road has many important commercial buildings and shopping centers. It is named after former Minister for Health of Indonesia, Major General (Ret.) Prof. Dr. Satrio. This is a 2.25 km long road that extends from Karet Sudirman, Tanah Abang, Central Jakarta to Casablanca Tunnel, Kuningan, South Jakarta. The road is located within the Golden Triangle of Jakarta. The road crosses 4 urban villages and has access point for Mega Kuningan.

== Important buildings ==
- Sampoerna Strategic Square
- Arena Futsal
- The Satrio Tower
- Ciputra Group Head Office
- ITC Kuningan
- Mall Ambasador
- NISP Tower ( Bank NISP )
- Ciputra World Jakarta
- Kuningan City
- Somerset Grand Citra Residence
- Hotel Manhattan Jakarta
- Danamon Tower ( Bank Danamon Indonesia )
- Malaysian Embassy
- Cyber2 Tower
- BTPN Tower
- Bank Muamalat

== Intersections ==
The road has 4 intersections:

- Junction at Karet Sudirman (towards Tanah Abang, Thamrin and Semanggi )
- East West intersection near the Satrio roundabout (towards Jalan Jenderal Gatot Subroto and Karet Pedurenan)
- Mega Kuningan Gate (towards Mega Kuningan )
- Intersection of Casablanca (towards Dukuh Atas, Casablanca and Tendean / Pacoran )

== Transport ==
- TransJakarta, feeder route Karet-Tebet.
- Kopaja, S602 Ragunan-Tanah Abang

== See also ==
- History of Jakarta
- Golden Triangle of Jakarta
- Mega Kunnigan
