= Kuningan City =

Shopping, residence, and office complex in Indonesia

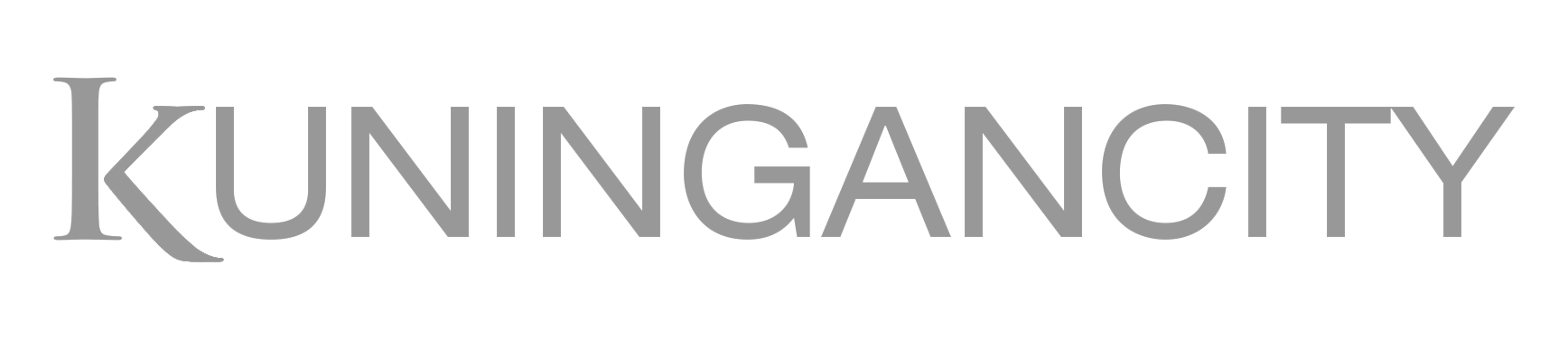

- Interactive map
- Location: Setiabudi, South Jakarta, Indonesia
- Coordinates: 6.2246°S 106.8296°E
- Address: Jalan Prof. Dr. Satrio, Kav 18, Kuningan
- Opened: 2012
- Developer: Agung Podomoro Group
- Num. of stores: 220
- Num. of anchor tenants: 2
- Floors: Residence Towers 58, Office Tower 45, Mall 6
- Website: www.kuningancity.com

Kuningan City in Jakarta, Indonesia is a mixed-use complex including a shopping mall, two apartment towers and one office tower. It is located in South Jakarta and is home to the largest Don Don Donki outlet in Indonesia.

The mall is called Kuningan City Mall, the apartment complex is named Denpasar Residence and the office tower is named AXA Tower, named after AXA Mandiri insurance company. The residential complex Denpasar Residence has two towers, named Kintamani Tower and Ubud Tower.

== See also ==
- List of shopping malls in Indonesia
- List of malls in Jakarta
- List of tallest buildings in Jakarta
