= GGWP =

Esports Website

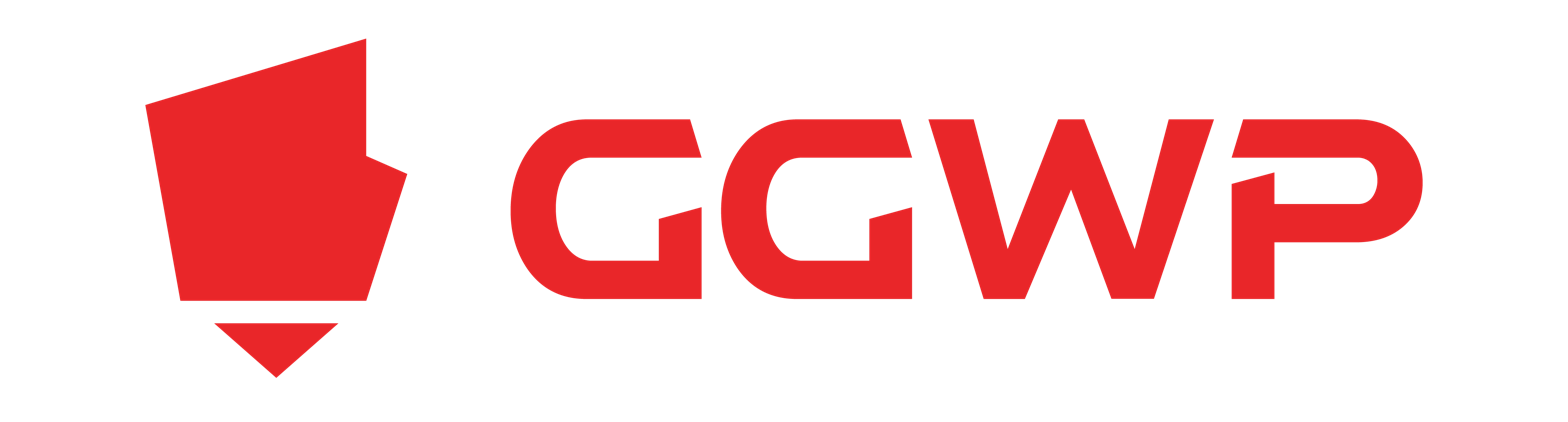
- Website type: Esports, games and online newspaper
- Founded: 15 July 2016; 10 years ago (as GGWP.ID); 19 October 2023; 2 years ago (as GGWP)
- Predecessor: GGWP.ID (2016-2023)
- Headquarters: Menara Global Lantai 3, Jalan Jenderal Gatot Subroto Kav. 27, East Kuningan, Setiabudi, South Jakarta 12950, South Jakarta, Indonesia
- Area served: Indonesia
- Key people: Ricky Setiawan (CEO GGWP); Winston Utomo (CEO at IDN); William Utomo (COO at IDN)
- Website: ggwp.id
- Commercial: Yes

GGWP (previously known as GGWP.ID) is digital media website focused on esports in Indonesia, owned and managed by IDN, a media platform company for the young generation in Indonesia.

== History ==
GGWP is a digital media focused around esports and esports tournaments founded by IDN Media on 15 July 2019, as GGWP.ID. GGWP is an acronym for Good Game Well Played, which is a phrase that is often used by players at esports tournaments.

As of 19 October 2023, GGWP.ID changed its name and logo to GGWP.

== Cooperation ==
GGWP collaborates with Indonesian Tourism and Creative Economy Agency and the Indonesian Game Association to hold annual games events Prime Asia, also called BEKRAF Game Prime, namely a business-to-business game conference, seminar and exhibition in Indonesia which was first held in 2016 at Balai Kartini in Jakarta. BEKRAF Game Prime is a means for local game developers to be able to follow trends and compete at the global level.

== Game development ==
On 14 April 2022, GGWP announced that it was developing the NFT game Purraria as a result of collaboration with development studio Kingdom Labs. Purrarria is a 1v1 tower defense game, where players can later collect NFT assets that can be played and upgraded.
