= Capital Tower =

Capital Tower can refer to:

- World Capital Tower, Jakarta
- Capital Tower (Amman, Jordan)
- Capital Tower (Singapore)
- Capital Tower, Cardiff
- Capital Gate, in Abu Dhabi
- Capital Towers (Moscow), Moscow
- Capital Towers (London), London

== See also ==
- Capitol Records Tower
