= Jalan H.R. Rasuna Said =

Main road in Jakarta, Indonesia

- Rasuna Said Avenue
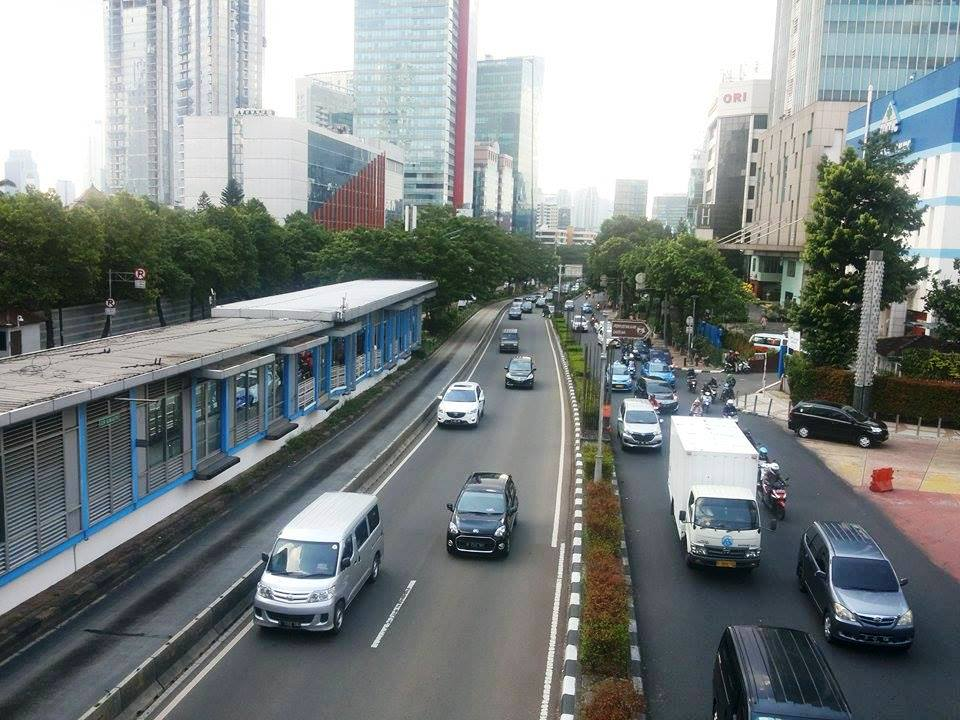
- The HR Rasuna Said Street before the construction of the Greater Jakarta LRT
- Interactive map of Jalan H.R. Rasuna Said
- Owner: Government of Jakarta
- Length: 4.9 km (3.0 mi)
- Location: South Jakarta
- North-West end: Setiabudi, South Jakarta
- South-East end: Mampang Prapatan, South Jakarta

Jalan H.R. Rasuna Said (H.R. Rasuna Said Avenue) or Jalan Rasuna Said (Rasuna Said Avenue) is one of the main avenues of Jakarta, Indonesia. It was constructed during the 1970s. It is located in the Golden Triangle of Jakarta. The road was named after Hajjah Rangkayo Rasuna Said, a National Hero of Indonesia. The road runs 4.9 km (3.0 mi) from Setiabudi, South Jakarta, to Tendean, Mampang Prapatan, South Jakarta. The Rasuna Said Street is also one of the Odd–even Traffic Restriction Scheme implementation zones (Monday to Friday, 06:00-10:00 and 16:00-21:00).

== History and planning ==
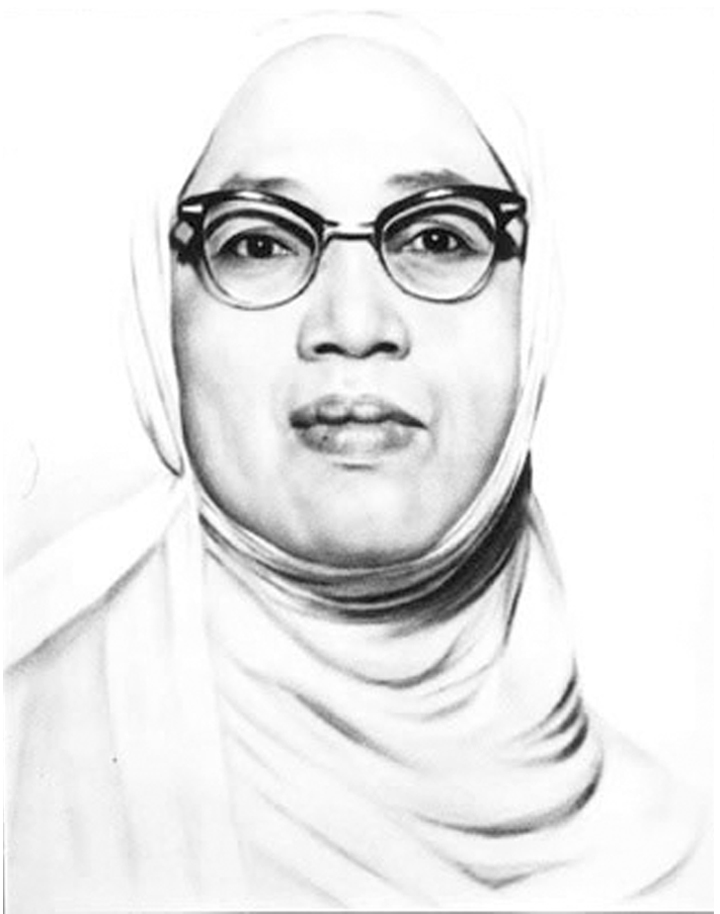
Portrait of Rasuna Said

Jalan Rasuna Said was a relatively new thoroughfare in Jakarta, having been planned during the early 1970s, when the Indonesian economy began a period of sustained high economic growth as a result of oil export revenue during the 1973 global energy crisis. Construction commenced in 1973, launched by Public Works and Electricity Minister Sutami. Planners had originally intended to extend Jalan HOS Cokroaminoto in Menteng to the south to meet Jalan Gatot Subroto. In this plan, the south end of Jalan Rasuna Said would be connected to Jalan Gatot Subroto via a partial cloverleaf interchange. This cloverleaf interchange plan was not implemented.

Jalan Rasuna Said was completed by 1979. Its first buildings included Gelanggang Soemantri Brojonegoro Sports Complex (1974), Gedung Wanita (demolished, now Gama Tower), and Setiabudi Building complex.

The area southwest of Jalan Kuningan was planned as the Future Kuningan Kompleks to contain a complex of embassies. This complex was developed as Mega Kuningan, one of the most expensive areas in Jakarta and home to the embassies of Hungary, Switzerland, the Netherlands, India, Singapore and Poland.

In the 1990s, Jalan Professor Dr. Satrio and Jalan Casablanca would extend from Jalan Kyai Haji Mas Mansyur through to Tebet, passing Jalan Rasuna Said in the middle via an underpass. In the 2010s, a flyover was constructed to ease congestion.

== Administrative villages ==
The road crosses seven administrative villages of Jakarta:

- Menteng, Central Jakarta
- Setiabudi, South Jakarta
- Guntur
- Karet
- Karet Kuningan
- Kuningan Timur
- Kuningan Barat, South Jakarta

There is an access point towards Mega Kuningan from the road. This road houses many important buildings, such as the Corruption Eradication Commission, Ministry of Health and foreign embassies.

== Notable buildings along Jl. HR. Rasuna Said ==
Sorted from north to south
West	East
St. Regis Hotels & Resorts Jakarta	Royal Kuningan Hotel
Plaza BP Jamsostek	The Red and White Building of the Indonesian Corruption Eradication Commission
IDP Education Kuningan Jakarta	The Red and White Building of the Indonesian Corruption Eradication Commission
Menara Duta	Empty
Setiabudi Tax Office	Empty
Lina Building	Menara Karya
Graha Arda	Imperium Tower ( Embassy of Bosnia and Herzegovina)
Gedung Ibnu Sutowo	Empty
Wisma Kodel	The Indonesian Corruption Eradication Commission Education Center
Embassy of Saudi Arabia	The Indonesian Corruption Eradication Commission Education Center
Ministry of National Development Planning of Indonesia	The Indonesian Corruption Eradication Commission Education Center
Wisma Bakrie	Jasa Rahaja
Bakrie Park	Mega Plaza
Bakrie Park	Gedung Wahana Tata
Bakrie Park	Gedung Wirausaha
Atrium Setiabudi	Wisma Budi
Setiabudi One	Wisma Tugu
Plaza Setiabudi 2	Danamon Bank Tower
Plaza Setiabudi 2	Plaza Kuningan
Lippo Kuningan	Mayapada Hospital Kuningan
Plaza 89 ( Embassy of Greece)	Former building of the embassy of Australia (no longer used, the embassy has moved to Jalan Patra Kuningan.)
Kuningan Tower	Mayapada Hospital
Ministry of Cooperatives and Small and Medium Enterprises	Menara Binakarsa
Ministry of Cooperatives and Small and Medium Enterprises	The Ombudsman of the Republic of Indonesia
Embassy of Russia	The H Tower
Embassy of Russia	MMC Hospital Jakarta
Ministry of Law and Human Rights	Rasuna Epicentrum
Ministry of Law and Human Rights	Plaza Festival
Ministry of Law and Human Rights	Haji Usmar Ismail Fim Center
Ministry of Law and Human Rights	JS Luwansa Hotel
Embassy of Malaysia	Gama Tower ( Embassy of India)
Embassy of Malaysia	Trinity Tower
Intersection with the Prof. Dr. Satrio Street (west) and Casablanca Street (east)
Cyber 2 Tower	Directorate General of Electricity of the Ministry of Energy and Mineral Resources
XL Axiata Tower	Palma Tower
Tempo Pavilion 1	Aribimo Sentral
Tempo Pavilion 1	Palma One
Tempo Pavilion 2	Mega Bank Syaria Tower
Ministry of Health	Pertamina Gas Station
Ministry of Health	Agro Plaza
Ministry of Health	Embassy of Algeria
Ministry of Health	Gedung Granadi
Ministry of Health	Empty
Menara Kadin	Graha Aktiva
Menara Karya	Gedung Indorama
Embassy of Poland	Empty
Embassy of Singapore	Empty
Former building of the embassy of India (no longer used, the embassy has moved to Gama Tower)	Gran Melia Hotel Jakarta
Embassy of the Netherlands	Tempo Scan Tower
Embassy of Hungary	The Jakarta High Prosecutor
Best Argo International	Embassy of Turkey

Buildings are sorted from Menteng to Mampang Prapatan.

== Intersections ==
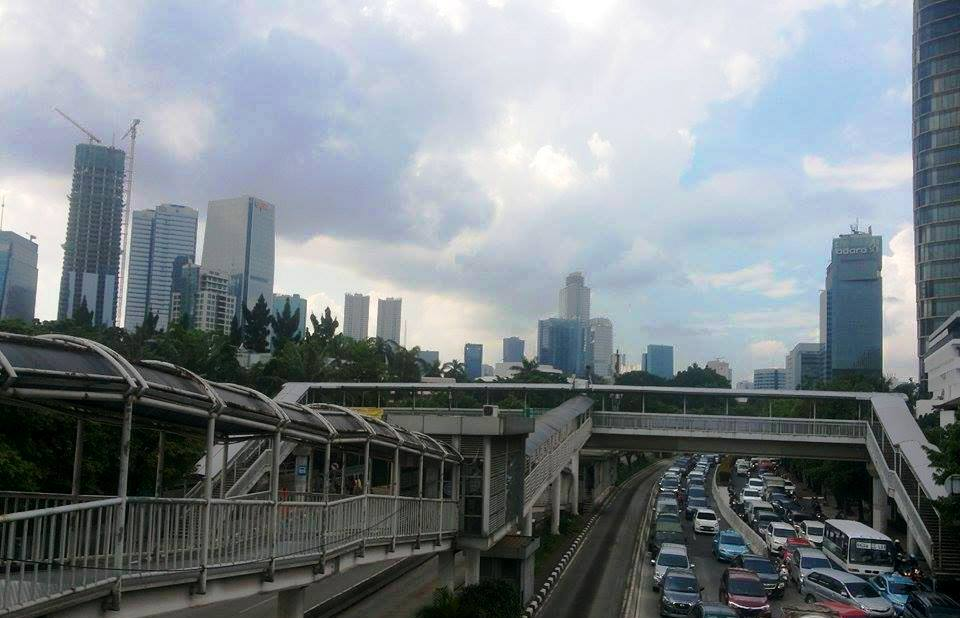
TransJakarta BRT station at the south-east end of Jalan HR Rasuna Said Jakarta. The Mega Kuningan financial district can be seen on left of the photo.

This road has 10 intersections, namely:

- Intersection Rasuna Said Bridge (towards Sudirman Station and Latuharhari)
- Intersection St. Regis Hotel Jakarta (towards St. Regis Hotel Jakarta)
- Intersection of East Menara Imperium (towards Tower Empire and Epicentrum)
- Intersection of West Atrium Setiabudi / Setiabudi Aini (towards Aini Hospital)
- Intersection of West and East (towards Karet Pedurenan and Epicentrum)
- Intersection of East GOR Sumantri (towards Epicentrum)
- Intersection of West and East Casablanca (into Kuningan and Casablanca)
- Intersection of West and East Patra Kuningan (into Mega Kuningan and Patra Park)
- Crossroads Kuningan Mampang (towards Semanggi and Pancoran)
- Tendean intersection (towards Tendean Plaza and Trans TV headquarters)

== Transportation ==
=== Bus routes ===
==== TransJakarta ====
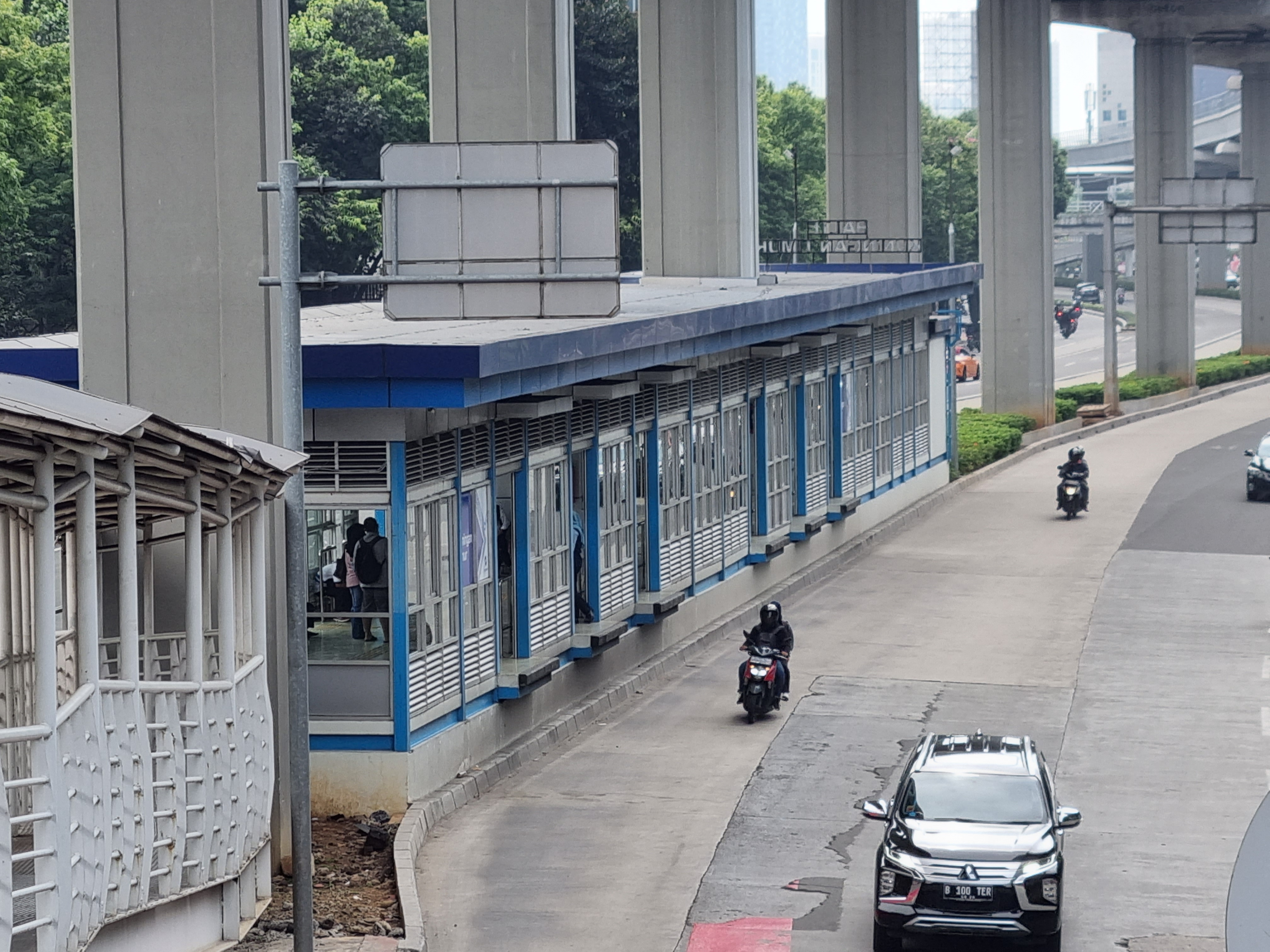
The Kuningan Timur shelter is one of the TransJakarta bus shelters on the HR Rasuna Said Street

The road is served by TransJakarta Corridor 6 with the route from Ragunan to Dukuh Atas 2. There are five TransJakarta shelters, they are:

- Kuningan Timur
- Patra Kuningan
- Departemen Kesehatan
- GOR Soemantri
- Karet Kuningan
- Kuningan Madya
- Setiabudi Utara

TransJakarta routes that serves HR Rasuna Said Street are:

- BRT routes
  - Corridor Pulo Gadung–Patra Kuningan
  - Corridor Ragunan–Dukuh Atas 2
  - Corridor Ragunan–M.H. Thamrin via Kuningan
  - Corridor L13E Latuharhari–Puri Beta 2 (express)
- Inner city feeder
  - Corridor 6H Lebak Bulus - Senen
  - Corridor 6K Patra Kuningan - Karet
- Railway station feeder
  - Corridor 6C Tebet Station - Departemen Kesehatan
  - Corridor 6M Manggarai Station–Blok M
- Royaltrans
  - 6P Cibubur Junction - Kuningan
  - B13 Summarecon Bekasi - Kuningan
  - D31 South City Cinere - Kuningan

=== Rail transport ===
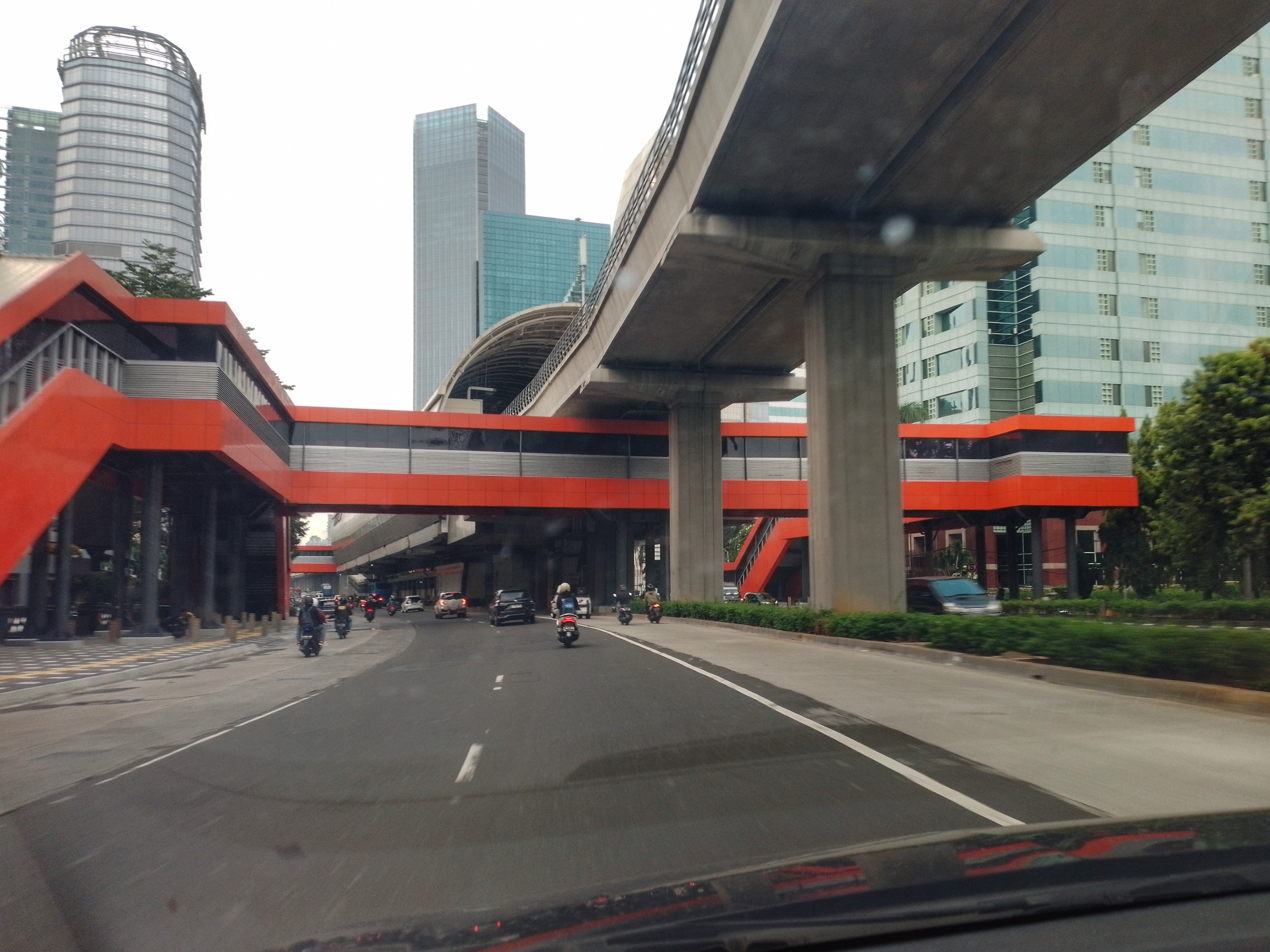
The Kuningan LRT station

The street is also served by Cibubur and Bekasi lines of the Jabodebek LRT with three stations. Those stations are:

- Kuningan
- Rasuna Said
- Setiabudi

== See also ==
- Rasuna Said
- Mega Kuningan
- Golden Triangle of Jakarta

== Cited works ==
- Berkmoes, R.V. et al. ¨Indonesia¨. Lonely Planet, 2010.
- Merrillees, Scott (2015). Jakarta: Portraits of a Capital 1950-1980. Jakarta: Equinox Publishing. ISBN 9786028397308.
