= Ritz-Carlton Jakarta =

Skyscraper hotel in Jakarta, Indonesia

The Ritz-Carlton Jakarta
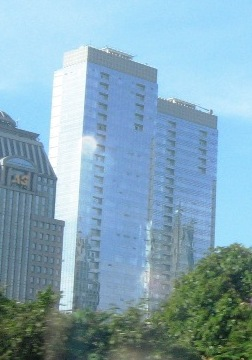
- Ritz-Carlton Jakarta

- Location in Jakarta

General information
- Location: Mega Kuningan, South Jakarta, Indonesia, Lingkar Mega Kuningan Street, Kav. E 1.1 No. 1, Jakarta
- Coordinates: 6°13′43″S 106°49′37.7″E
- Opening: 2005
- Owner: Ritz-Carlton

Height
- Height: 212 m (696 ft)

Technical details
- Floor count: 48
- Floor area: 140,000 m^{2}

Design and construction
- Developer: PT Mutiara Permata Mulia

Other information
- Number of rooms: 278
- Number of suites: 55

The Ritz-Carlton Jakarta is a hotel and skyscraper at Mega Kuningan in South Jakarta, Indonesia, operated by The Ritz-Carlton Hotel Company, and adjacent to the sister JW Marriott Hotel. The complex has two towers, the hotel and the Airlangga Apartment. The hotel was opened in 2005.

The building is 212 m (696 ft) tall and has 48 floors and 4 basement levels. Construction on the building started in April 2003 and ended in October 2004. The Hotel has 278 Club level rooms and 55 Suites.

It was bombed on 17 July 2009. The facade of the Ritz-Carlton was blown away by the blast and windows had been blown out of the Airlangga Restaurant on the second storey.

== See also ==
- List of tallest hotels in the world
