= List of diplomatic missions in Indonesia =

This is a list of diplomatic missions in Indonesia. At present, the capital city of Jakarta hosts 109 embassies. As Jakarta hosts the headquarters of the Association of Southeast Asian Nations (ASEAN), the city also hosts missions of both members and observers to the organization. In practice, missions to ASEAN could be integrated or separated from their respective embassies to Indonesia.

This listing excludes honorary consulates.

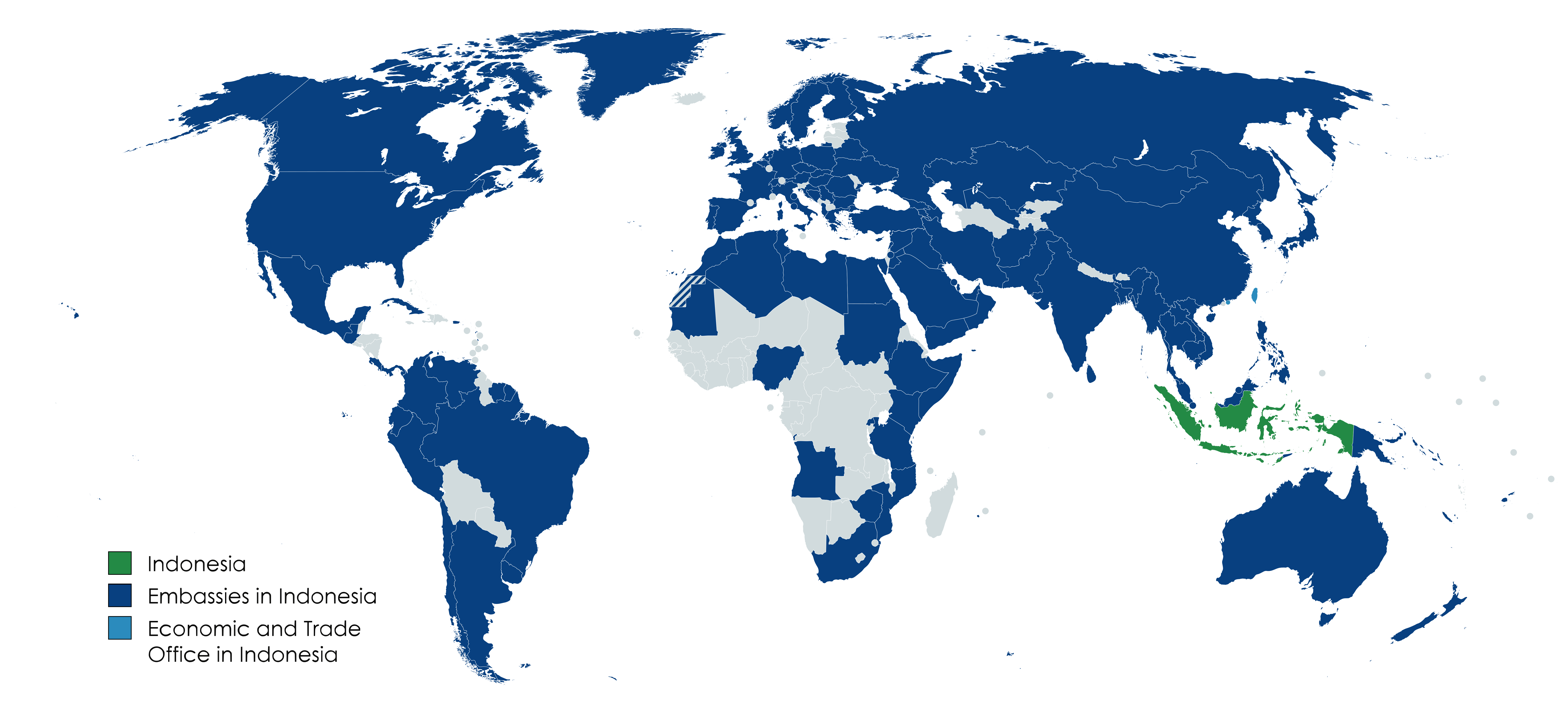
Map of diplomatic missions in Indonesia

== Diplomatic missions in Jakarta ==
=== Embassies ===
1. Afghanistan
2. Albania
3. Algeria
4. Angola
5. Argentina
6. Armenia
7. Australia
8. Austria
9. Azerbaijan
10. Bahrain
11. Bangladesh
12. Belarus
13. Belgium
14. Bosnia and Herzegovina
15. Brazil
16. Brunei
17. Bulgaria
18. Cambodia
19. Canada
20. Chile
21. China
22. Colombia
23. Costa Rica
24. Croatia
25. Cuba
26. Cyprus
27. Czech Republic
28. Denmark
29. Ecuador
30. Egypt
31. Ethiopia
32. Fiji
33. Finland
34. France
35. Georgia
36. Germany
37. Greece
38. Guatemala
39. Holy See
40. Hungary
41. India
42. Iran
43. Iraq
44. Ireland
45. Italy
46. Japan
47. Jordan
48. Kazakhstan
49. Kenya
50. Kuwait
51. Laos
52. Lebanon
53. Libya
54. Malaysia
55. Mauritania
56. Mexico
57. Mongolia
58. Morocco
59. Mozambique
60. Myanmar
61. Netherlands
62. New Zealand
63. Nigeria
64. North Korea
65. Norway
66. Oman
67. Pakistan
68. Palestine
69. Panama
70. Papua New Guinea
71. Peru
72. Philippines
73. Poland
74. Portugal
75. Qatar
76. Romania
77. Russia
78. Rwanda
79. San Marino
80. Saudi Arabia
81. Serbia
82. Singapore
83. Slovakia
84. Solomon Islands
85. Somalia
86. South Africa
87. South Korea
88. Spain
89. Sri Lanka
90. Sudan
91. Suriname
92. Sweden
93. Switzerland
94. Syria
95. Tanzania
96. Thailand
97. Timor-Leste
98. Tunisia
99. Turkey
100. Ukraine
101. United Arab Emirates
102. United Kingdom
103. United States
104. Uruguay
105. Uzbekistan
106. Venezuela
107. Vietnam
108. Yemen
109. Zimbabwe

=== Missions to the Association of Southeast Asian Nations (ASEAN) ===
1. Australia
2. Brazil
3. Brunei
4. Cambodia
5. Canada
6. China
7. European Union (Delegation)
8. India
9. Indonesia
10. Japan
11. Laos
12. Malaysia
13. Myanmar
14. New Zealand
15. Philippines
16. Russia
17. Singapore
18. South Korea
19. Thailand
20. Timor-Leste
21. United Arab Emirates
22. United Kingdom
23. United States
24. Vietnam

=== Other missions/delegations ===
1. European Union (Delegation)
2. Hong Kong (Economic & Trade Office)
3. Republic of China (Taiwan) (Economic & Trade Office)
4. United Nations (Resident Coordinator Office)

== Consular missions ==
=== Atambua, East Nusa Tenggara ===
Country	Mission
Timor-Leste	Consular Agency

=== Badung, Bali ===
Country	Mission
South Korea	Consulate
United States	Consular Agency

=== Batam, Riau Islands ===
Country	Mission
Singapore	Consulate-General

=== Denpasar, Bali ===
Country	Mission
Australia	Consulate-General
China	Consulate-General
India	Consulate-General
Japan	Consulate-General
Russia	Consulate-General
Timor-Leste	Consulate-General

=== Jayapura, Papua ===
Country	Mission
Papua New Guinea	Consulate-General

=== Kupang, East Nusa Tenggara ===
Country	Mission
Timor-Leste	Consulate

=== Makassar, South Sulawesi ===
Country	Mission
Australia	Consulate-General
Japan	Consular Office

=== Manado, North Sulawesi ===
Country	Mission
Philippines	Consulate-General

=== Medan, North Sumatra ===
Country	Mission
China	Consulate-General
India	Consulate-General
Japan	Consulate-General
Malaysia	Consulate-General
Singapore	Consulate-General
United States	Consulate

=== Pekanbaru, Riau ===
Country	Mission
Malaysia	Consulate

=== Pontianak, West Kalimantan ===
Country	Mission
Malaysia	Consulate

=== Surabaya, East Java ===
Country	Mission
Australia	Consulate-General
China	Consulate-General
Japan	Consulate-General
Republic of China (Taiwan)	Economic & Trade Office
United States	Consulate-General

== Non-resident embassies accredited to Indonesia ==
=== Resident in Bangkok, Thailand ===
Country
Bhutan
Luxembourg

=== Resident in Beijing, China ===
Country
Bahamas
Bolivia
Cameroon
Chad
Comoros
Guinea-Bissau
Malawi
Montenegro

=== Resident in Canberra, Australia ===
Country
Botswana
El Salvador
North Macedonia
Samoa
Slovenia
Tonga

=== Resident in Hanoi, Vietnam ===
Country
Haiti
Nicaragua

=== Resident in Kuala Lumpur, Malaysia ===
Country
Eswatini
Ghana
Guinea
Kyrgyzstan
Lesotho
Maldives
Mauritius
Namibia
Nepal
Senegal
Tajikistan
Turkmenistan
Uganda
Zambia

=== Resident in New Delhi, India ===
Country
Burkina Faso
Burundi
Congo-Kinshasa
Congo-Brazzaville
Equatorial Guinea
Eritrea
Gambia
Guyana
Mali
Niger
Seychelles
Trinidad and Tobago

=== Resident in Singapore ===
Country
Estonia
Lithuania

=== Resident in Suva, Fiji ===
Country
Kiribati
Tuvalu

=== Resident in Tokyo, Japan ===
Country
Benin
Djibouti
Dominican Republic
Federated States of Micronesia
Gabon
Iceland
Ivory Coast
Jamaica
Liberia
Madagascar
Paraguay
Togo

=== Resident in New York City, United States ===
Accredited missions are the sending countries' permanent missions to the United Nations.

Country
Antigua and Barbuda
Cape Verde
Central African Republic
Dominica
Honduras
Saint Kitts and Nevis
Saint Lucia
São Tomé and Príncipe

=== Other Resident Locations ===
Country	Host city
Grenada	Washington, D.C.
Latvia	Riga
Malta	Valletta
Marshall Islands	Taipei
Palau	Manila
Sierra Leone	Seoul

== Closed missions ==
Host city	Sending country	Mission	Year closed	Ref.
Jakarta	Guinea-Bissau	Embassy (Note: Resident in Beijing, China)	2021	
Jakarta	Paraguay	Embassy (Note: Resident in Tokyo, Japan)	2014	
Jakarta	Senegal	Embassy (Note: Resident in Kuala Lumpur, Malaysia)	Unknown	
Banjarmasin	China	Consulate	1965	
Denpasar	United Kingdom	Consulate	Unknown	
Kupang	Australia	Consulate	1999	
Medan	Australia	Consulate	Unknown	
Medan	United Kingdom	Consulate	Unknown	
Pekanbaru	Singapore	Consulate	2012	

== Missions to open ==
Host city	Sending country	Mission	Ref.
Jakarta	Ghana	Embassy	
Jakarta	Madagascar	Embassy	
Jakarta	Senegal	Embassy	
Jakarta	Sierra Leone	Embassy	
Jakarta	Tajikistan	Embassy	
Jakarta	Vanuatu	Embassy	
Manado	China	Consulate-General	

== See also ==
- List of diplomatic missions of Indonesia
- Foreign relations of Indonesia
- List of diplomatic missions in Jakarta
