= JW Marriott Jakarta =

Luxury hotel in South Jakarta, Indonesia

- View of the JW Marriott Jakarta, July 2024

- Location in Jakarta

General information
- Location: 1-2 Jl. Lingkar, Mega Kuningan, South Jakarta, Indonesia
- Coordinates: 6°13′37.3″S 106°49′37″E
- Opening: 26 September 2001

Technical details
- Floor count: 30

Other information
- Number of rooms: 333

The JW Marriott Jakarta is a 5 star luxury hotel in Mega Kuningan, South Jakarta, Indonesia. The hotel is adjacent to the sister Ritz-Carlton Jakarta Hotel. The hotel—operated by JW Marriott—was opened in 2001 and offers 333 rooms and suites. It has been bombed twice, first in 2003 and the second time in 2009 by terrorists. The hotel has sustained $500 million in damage from its two deadly bombings. There are now five layers of blast walls surrounding the hotel, armed security personnel, and magnetometers to enter the hotel.

== Incidents ==
It has been bombed twice, first in 2003 and the second time in 2009 by terrorists. On 5 August 2003, a suicide bomber detonated a car bomb outside the lobby of the JW Marriott Hotel, killing twelve people and injuring 150. Among those killed were eight Indonesian, one Dutch, one Danish, and two Chinese people. The hotel was viewed as a Western symbol, and had been used by the United States embassy for various events. The hotel was closed for five weeks and reopened to the public on 8 September.

On 17 July 2009, at around 7:50 am local time (0:50 UTC), the JW Marriott Hotel and the Ritz-Carlton Hotel in Jakarta, were hit by separate bombings five minutes apart. Three of the seven victims who were killed were Australians, two from the Netherlands, and one each from New Zealand and Indonesia. More than 50 people were injured in the blasts. Both blasts were caused by suicide bombers, who checked into the hotels as paying guests several days earlier. The twin suicide bombings came four years after the last serious terrorist attack in Indonesia.
