= Ciputra World Jakarta =

Residential skyscrapers in Indonesia

Coordinates: 6.224055°S 106.823085°E

- Ciputra World I
- Interactive map of the Ciputra World Jakarta area

General information
- Type: Mixed
- Location: Jakarta, Indonesia, Jalan Prof. Dr. Satrio Kav 3-5, Kav 11, Kav 4 & 6
- Construction started: 2011
- Cost: US$ 1.25 billion (IDR 15 trillion)
- Owner: PT. Ciputra Development Tbk

Design and construction
- Architect: Nikken Sekkei Ltd.
- Developer: PT. Ciputra Development Tbk
- Structural engineer: PT. ASCE

Ciputra World Jakarta is a mixed development complex, which is built by PT. Ciputra Development Tbk, located on Jalan Prof. Dr. Satrio, Mega Kuningan, South Jakarta, Indonesia. With a total land area of 15 hectares, Ciputra World Jakarta planned to have 15 towers. It is divided in three separate but adjacent land blocks.

== Buildings ==
Ciputra World II

Ciputra World 1 Jakarta has a land area of 5.5 hectares. The complex includes three towers; Raffles Hotel and Raffles Residences Jakarta; My Home Apartments & Ascott Service Apartment; and DBS Bank Tower. Ciputra Artpreneur Center (Museum, Theatre & Gallery) and a shopping centre (Lotte Mall, formerly Lotte Shopping Avenue) is also located in the complex. This is one of the largest buildings in the world by floor area.

Ciputra World 2 Jakarta has a land area of 4.5 hectares. The development has six towers used for office space; W Hotels Jakarta and the Hotel Apartment, the Office Satrio, the Orchard Condominium, the Residence and Fraser Suites Serviced Apartment, and The Newton 1, 2 apartment towers. The office building (known as Tokopedia Tower) houses Tokopedia, which is one of Indonesia’s biggest online marketplace. The project also has a green area of about 60% of the land area.

Ciputra World 3 Jakarta is planned to have conference & exhibition centre with a large capacity.

== See also ==
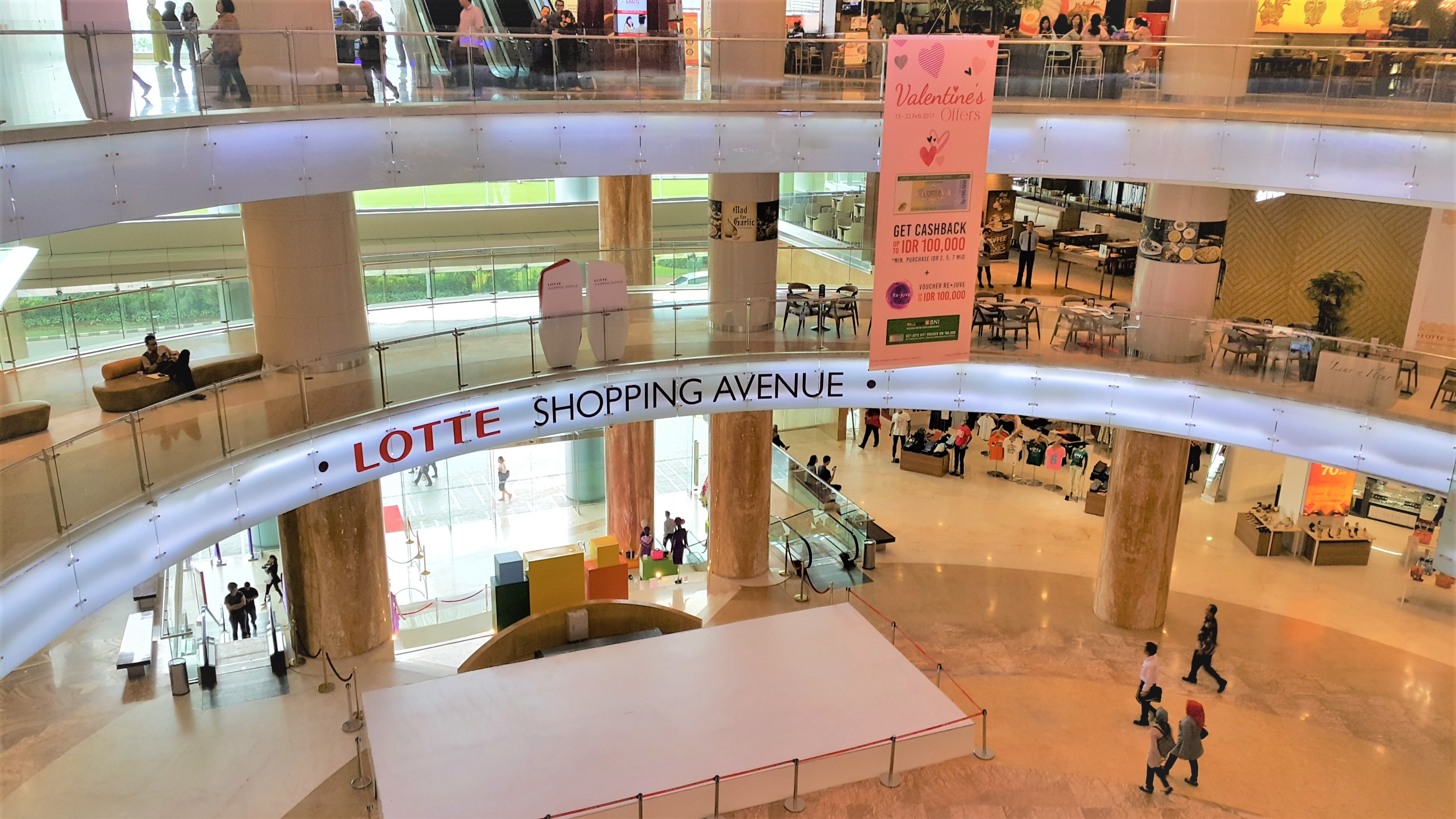
The Lotte Mall (formerly Lotte Shopping Avenue) is built within Ciputra World 1

Side view of Ciputra World Jakarta

- List of tallest buildings in Jakarta
- Ciputra World Surabaya
