= World Capital Tower =

Coordinates: 6.229326°S 106.826759°E

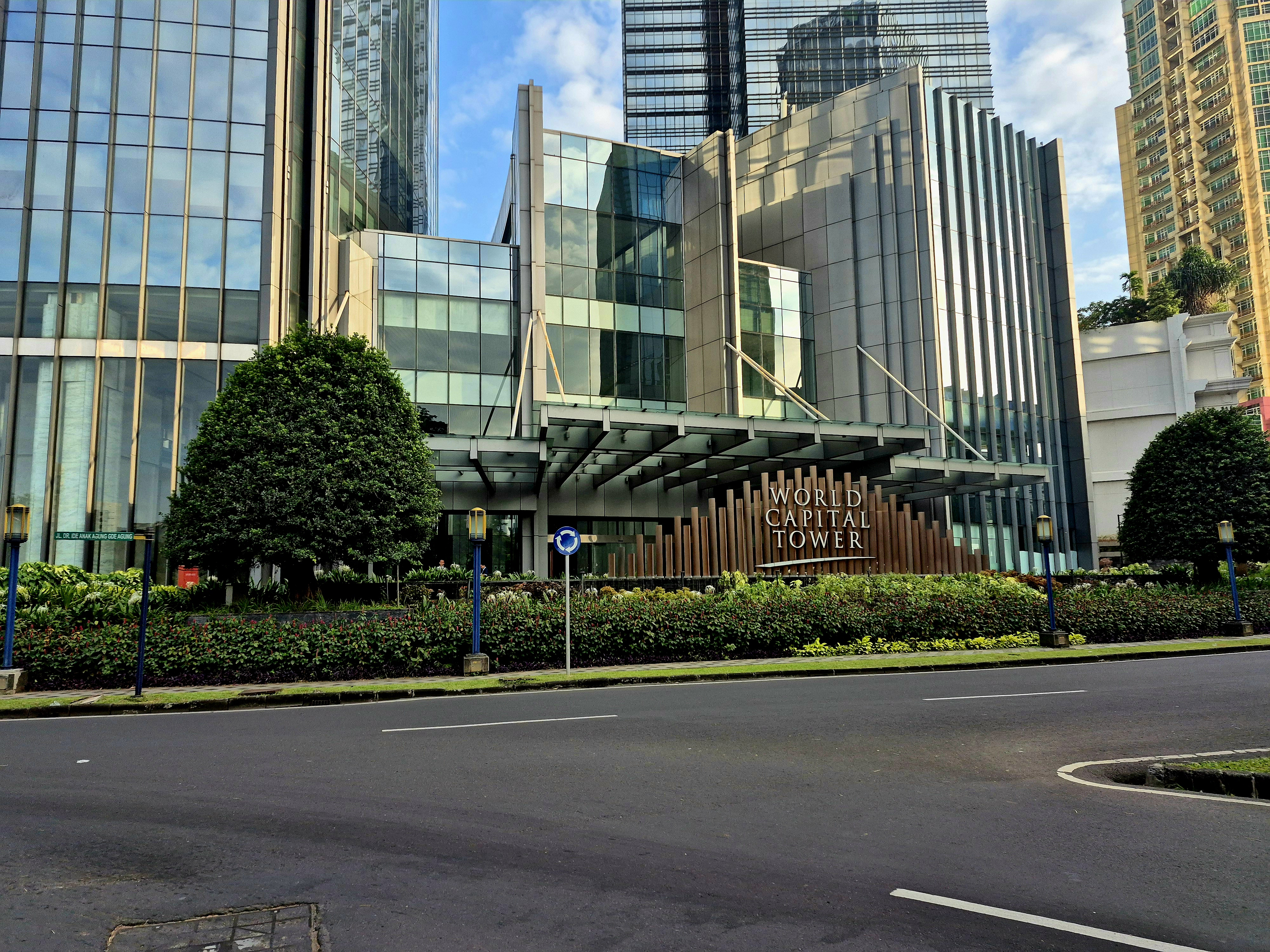
- Interactive map of the World Capital Tower area

General information
- Type: Office
- Location: Jakarta, Indonesia, JL. DR. Ide Anak Agung Gde Agung Parcel B, Mega Kuningan, South Jakarta
- Construction started: 2013
- Completed: 2017
- Owner: PT. Mega Kuningan International And Pollux Properties

Height
- Architectural: 270 m (890 ft)

Technical details
- Floor count: 54
- Lifts/elevators: 24

Design and construction
- Architects: Aedas & Tetra Design
- Developer: PT. Mega Kuningan Pinnacle
- Structural engineer: PT. Gistama Inti Semesta
- Main contractor: PT. Nusa Konstruksi Enjiniring

World Capital Tower is a skyscraper at Mega Kuningan, South Jakarta, Indonesia. The skyscraper has total floor area of 70,000 sq.meters with retail & entertainment space. The tower, which is 270 meter-tall, has 54 floors. It is one of the tallest office buildings in Jakarta.

The WCT is equipped with bomb and metal detection equipment, including 10 meters of glass applications and 19 mm thick bomb blast glass proof material in the main lobby. To reduce noise from outside and to reject the heat of the sun, the tower is equipped with infrared rays, and building facades coated low-e-double glass. WCT will also be equipped with a garden area of 3,000 square meters and a special building (annex) three floors covering an area of 2.700 square meters for retail and lifestyle, especially food & beverage.

== Awards ==
In December 2019, World Capital Tower scored at the 14th Asia Property Awards Grand Final.

== See also ==
- List of tallest buildings in Indonesia
- List of tallest buildings in Jakarta
