= 2009 Jakarta bombings =

Terrorist attacks in Indonesia

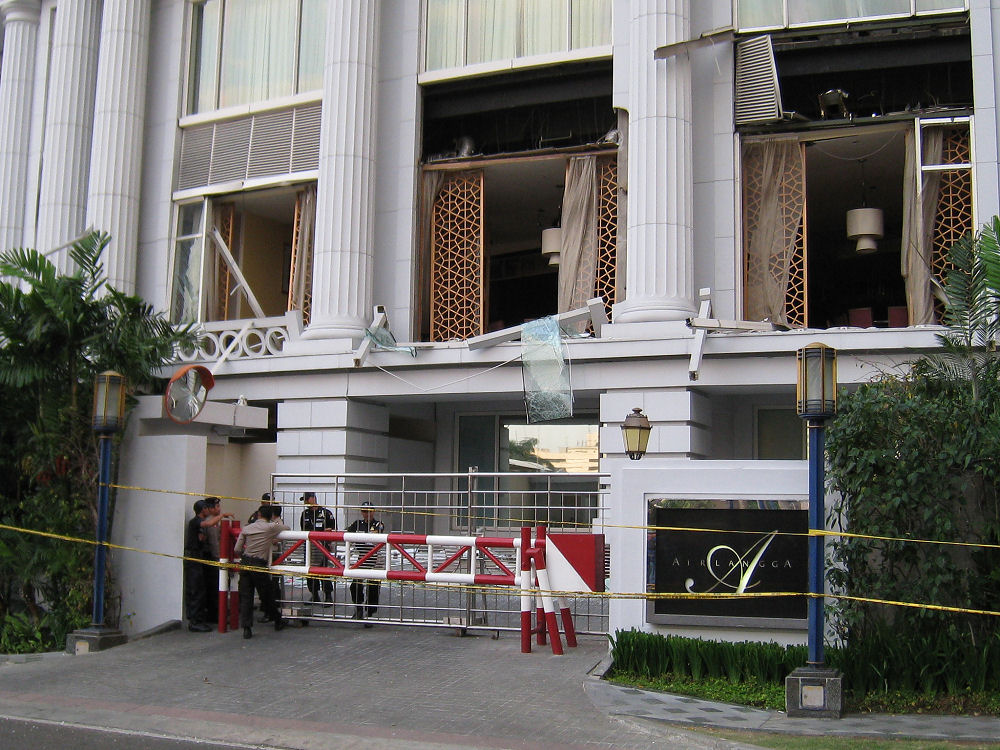
- Damaged Ritz-Carlton Hotel

- 2009 Jakarta bombings (Jakarta) Location of the attacked, JW Marriott and Ritz Carlton
- Location: 6.225758°S 106.827139°E 6.230448°S 106.825925°E; Jakarta, Indonesia
- Date: 17 July 2009; 17 years ago 07:47–07:57 WIB. (UTC+07)
- Target: JW Marriott and Ritz-Carlton Hotels
- Attack type: Suicide bombing, terrorism
- Deaths: 9 (including the perpetrators)
- Injuries: 53

A series of bombings took place in Jakarta, Indonesia, on 17 July 2009. At around 07:47 until 07:57 WIB (00:47-00:57 UTC), the JW Marriott and Ritz-Carlton Hotels in Setiabudi, South Jakarta, were hit by two suicide bombers. The attacks were carried out five minutes apart. Seven people were killed, including three Australians, two Dutch, an Indonesian and a New Zealander. More than 50 people were injured in the blasts. Both blasts were caused by suicide bombers, who checked into the hotels as paying guests several days earlier. The twin suicide bombings came four years after the previous serious terrorist attack in Indonesia.

== Background ==
Since the 2002 Bali bombings, in which 202 were killed, Indonesia had stepped up attempts to crack down on terrorism. An anti-terrorism law was confirmed by the Indonesian legislature in 2003. The 2002 attacks was carried out by Jemaah Islamiyah, a group previously linked to al-Qaeda and later to Islamic State of Iraq and the Levant (ISIL), and seeking to unite Indonesia, Malaysia, and the southern Philippines as an Islamic state.

The Marriott had previously been the target of a suicide bombing in August 2003.

== The attacks ==
The Marriott bombing occurred first and was followed five minutes later by the Ritz bombing. Police moved to seal off the surrounding area. At noon local time, an unexploded bomb was found in room 1808 of the Marriott, together with bomb-making equipment.

The Ritz-Carlton explosion is thought to have originated in the Airlangga Restaurant on the second story, where people were eating breakfast. There was said to be glass everywhere. A part of the facade of the Ritz Carlton was blown away by the blast and windows had been blown out.

The Marriott bombing occurred during one of a series of periodic breakfast meetings of CEOs and other prominent (and predominantly expatriate) members of the Jakarta business community hosted by James Castle, president of AmCham Indonesia, a branch of the United States Chamber of Commerce in Jakarta. The Marriott bomb was detonated in a small breakfast room rented for the event, and not in the main restaurant. One witness said the lobby of the neighboring Plaza Mutiara building was destroyed in the explosion.

The unexploded bomb in room 1808 of the JW Marriott hotel was programmed to go off prior to the other bomb there, but its timer malfunctioned. The Indonesian police believe the bomb was intended to create an atmosphere of panic, causing guests to flee their rooms to exit the hotel, and generating a significant crowd in the lobby. Had this occurred as planned, the lobby bomb may have taken a much greater toll.

=== Casualties ===
There were a total of nine fatalities: three Australians, one New Zealander, two Dutch tourists, and three Indonesians (including two suicide bombers). The Australians killed were Austrade official Craig Senger, mining executive Garth McEvoy and Perth businessman Nathan Verity. New Zealander Tim Mackay died; he was president and director of PT Holcim Indonesia and a master mariner. The Indonesian man killed was Evert Mokodompis, a waiter at the JW Marriott Hotel.

Sixteen foreigners were treated at Metropolitan Medical Center (MMC) hospital. A New Zealander, a Canadian, an Indian and 3 Dutch men were reported injured.

== Investigation ==
Police believe planning for the bombings was led by Noordin Mohammad Top, who also involved in the 2005 Palu market bombing. The first meeting had been held on 30 April. Ibrohim, a florist who worked for a florist company which had stores in both the bombed hotels, was another key organiser. Ibrohim was recruited in 2000 by Saifudin Jaelani, his brother-in-law, while he was working as a florist at the Hotel Mulia in Jakarta. In 2005, Ibrohim and Jaelani were inaugurated as members of Noordin's special forces. Ibrohim set strategies, conducted surveys of the locations and smuggled the bombs into the hotels. Saifudin Jaelani is believed to have also recruited the suicide bombers for the operation.

The bombs were smuggled into the JW Marriott one day before the blast through the hotel's loading dock using a pick-up truck rented by Ibrohim. The bomb design and materials of an unexploded bomb found by Police in room 1808 were identical to those used by Jemaah Islamiyah in previous attacks.

The suicide bomber of the JW Marriott Hotel was Dani Dwi Permana, an 18-year-old graduate of a private senior high school in Bogor, West Java. The suicide bomber of the Ritz-Carlton hotel was Nana Ikhwan Maulana, a 28-year-old former resident of Pandeglang, Banten. Dani rented room 1808 in the JW Marriott. The room was paid for by Amir Abdillah, who was arrested on 5 August.

On 7 August, police raided a house in Temanggung, Central Java. Three people were arrested and one person was killed, later identified to be Ibrohim. On 8 August, police raided a house in Bekasi, West Java, killing two people believed to be preparing to attack the Indonesian president Susilo Bambang Yudhoyono with a truck bomb near his private residence in Bogor, West Java.

Funding for the bombings is believed to have been provided from the Middle East. A number of suspects, including a Saudi Arabian national, have been arrested by Indonesian police for their involvement in handling the funds.

== Aftermath ==
The bombings were deplored by numerous governments—in Indonesia, elsewhere in the region, and around the world. United States president Barack Obama, who spent a portion of his childhood in Jakarta, said, "I strongly condemn the attacks that occurred this morning in Jakarta, and extend my deepest condolences to all of the victims and their loved ones. The US government stands ready to help the Indonesian government respond to and recover from these outrageous attacks as a friend and partner."

Manchester United, which had been scheduled to play an exhibition football match in Jakarta on 20 July 2009 and had booked rooms at the Ritz Carlton, cancelled the Jakarta leg of its tour.

== Reopening ==
The hotel was closed for 2 weeks and reopened to the public on Monday, 3 August 2009 at 10:00 WIB. The 17th United States Ambassador to Indonesia's Cameron R. Hume attended the reopening of the JW Marriott and Ritz Carlton Hotels on Wednesday, 29 July 2009 in Jakarta. The ambassador visited both hotels.

== See also ==
- 2003 Marriott Hotel bombing
- Jakarta school bombing
