= BTPN Towers =

Coordinates: 6.228349°S 106.823607°E

- BTPN Tower Far right
- Interactive map of the BTPN Towers area

General information
- Type: office and hotel
- Location: Jakarta, Indonesia, Mega Kuningan
- Construction started: 2013
- Completed: 2016

Height
- Architectural: 223 m (732 ft)
- Tip: 223 m
- Top floor: 223 m (732 ft)

Technical details
- Floor count: 48 (Office Tower); 25 (Hotel Tower)

Design and construction
- Architects: M² Master Planning & Architecture; Pandega Desain Weharima (PDW)
- Developer: PT. Bahana Semesta Citra Nusantara
- Structural engineer: Haerte (HRT) Widya Konsultan

BTPN Towers are a pair of skyscrapers located at Mega Kuningan in Jakarta, Indonesia. They are part of a mixed use development called the Quadrant Complex. There are two buildings: The BTPN Office Tower, also known as Menara BTPN, is 223 meters tall and has 48 floors. It was constructed from 2013 to 2016, and serves as the headquarters for Bank BTPN, now part of Sumitomo Mitsui Banking Corporation as well as other businesses. The BTPN Hotel Tower has 25 floors and is under construction.

== See also ==
- List of tallest buildings in Indonesia
- List of tallest buildings in Jakarta
