= Setiabudi =

District in South Jakarta, Indonesia

- District
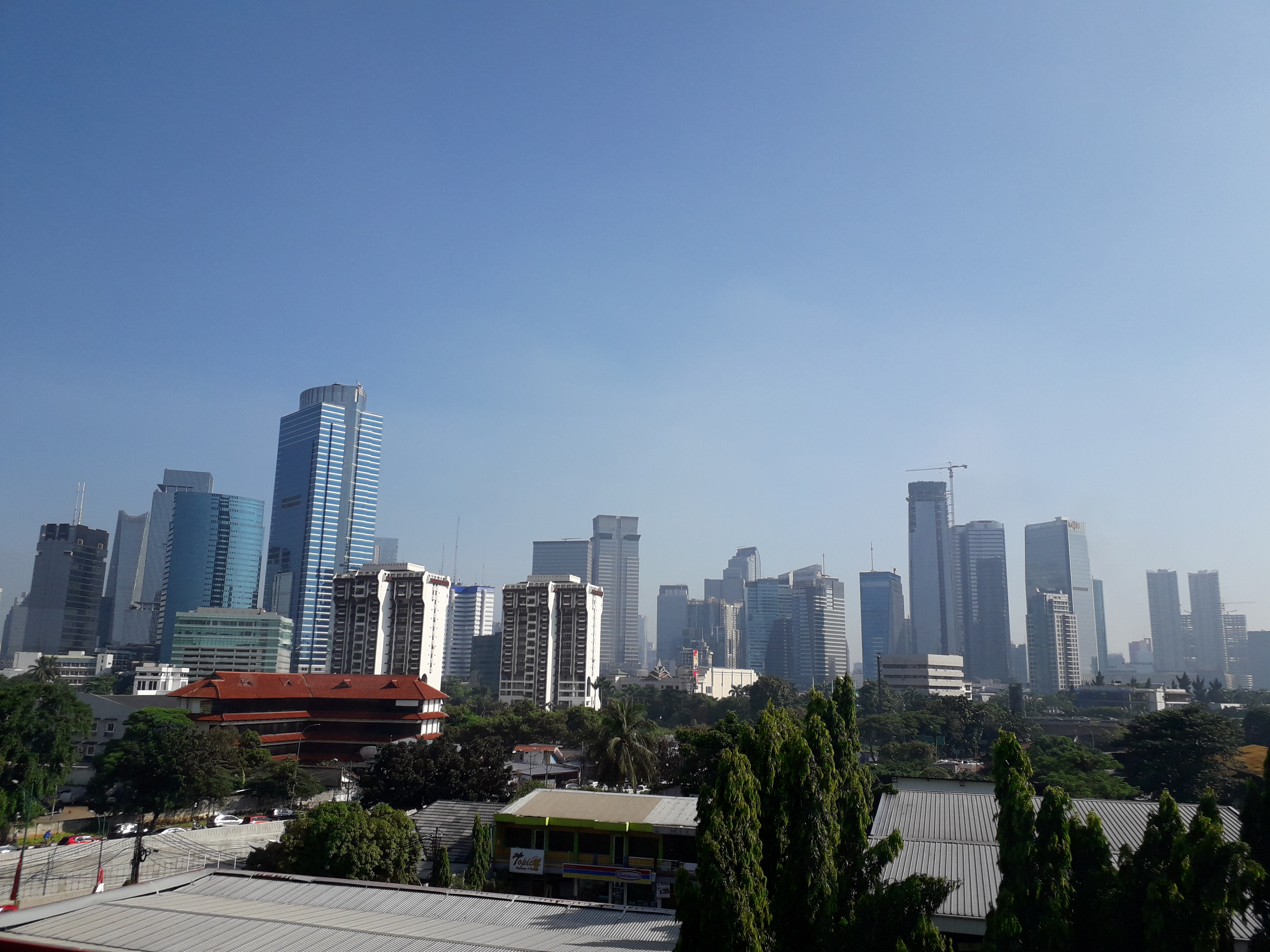
- Skyline of Kuningan, Setiabudi

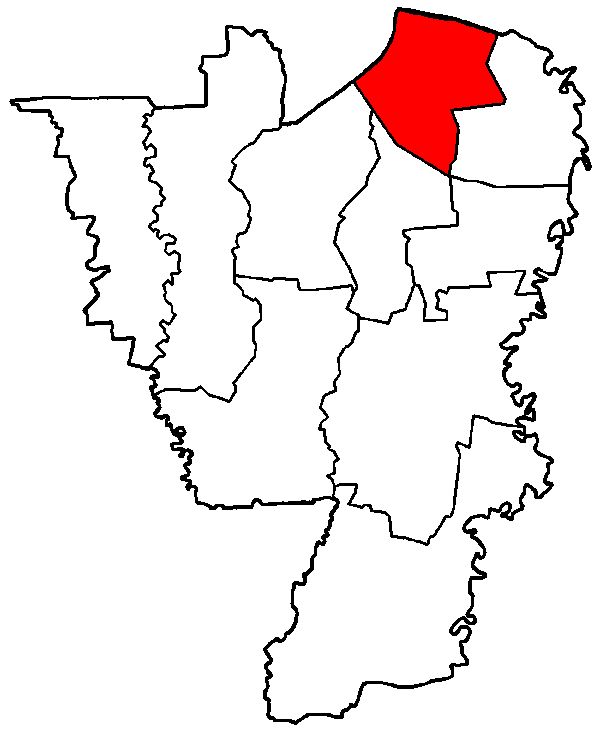
- The district of Setiabudi in South Jakarta
- Country: Indonesia
- Province: Jakarta
- Administrative city: South Jakarta

Setiabudi is a district in the administrative city of South Jakarta, Indonesia. It is part of the Golden Triangle of Jakarta (Indonesian: Segitiga Emas Jakarta), the centre of business and commercial establishments in the city. Setiabudi is named after an Indonesian hero of partial Indo and Sundanese descent, Ernest Douwes Dekker, also known as Danudirdja Setiabudi. Setiabudi is bordered by Central Jakarta in the north.

== History ==
Setiabudi was among the first housing neighborhoods in Jakarta after Indonesia is independent. It is the oldest of such place in the district and contains the oldest buildings standing. It was among the first two neighborhoods with direct access to the Sudirman Road, the other being Bendungan Hilir.

Planning was initiated in the 1950s but mostly completed in the 1960s. The work heralded the building of the Kuningan Road.

== Subdistricts ==
Setiabudi is divided into eight kelurahan or subdistricts:

| Name | Area/postal code |
|---|---|
| Setiabudi | 12910 |
| Karet | 12920 |
| Karet Semanggi | 12930 |
| Karet Kuningan | 12940 |
| Kuningan Timur | 12950 |
| Menteng Atas | 12960 |
| Pasar Manggis | 12970 |
| Guntur | 12980 |

== Boundaries ==
It is bounded by Cideng River, Menteng Pulo Road, a water channel to the east, a flood channel to the north, Jalan Jenderal Sudirman (a main road to the west), and Jalan Jenderal Gatot Subroto (a main road to the south).

== List of important places ==
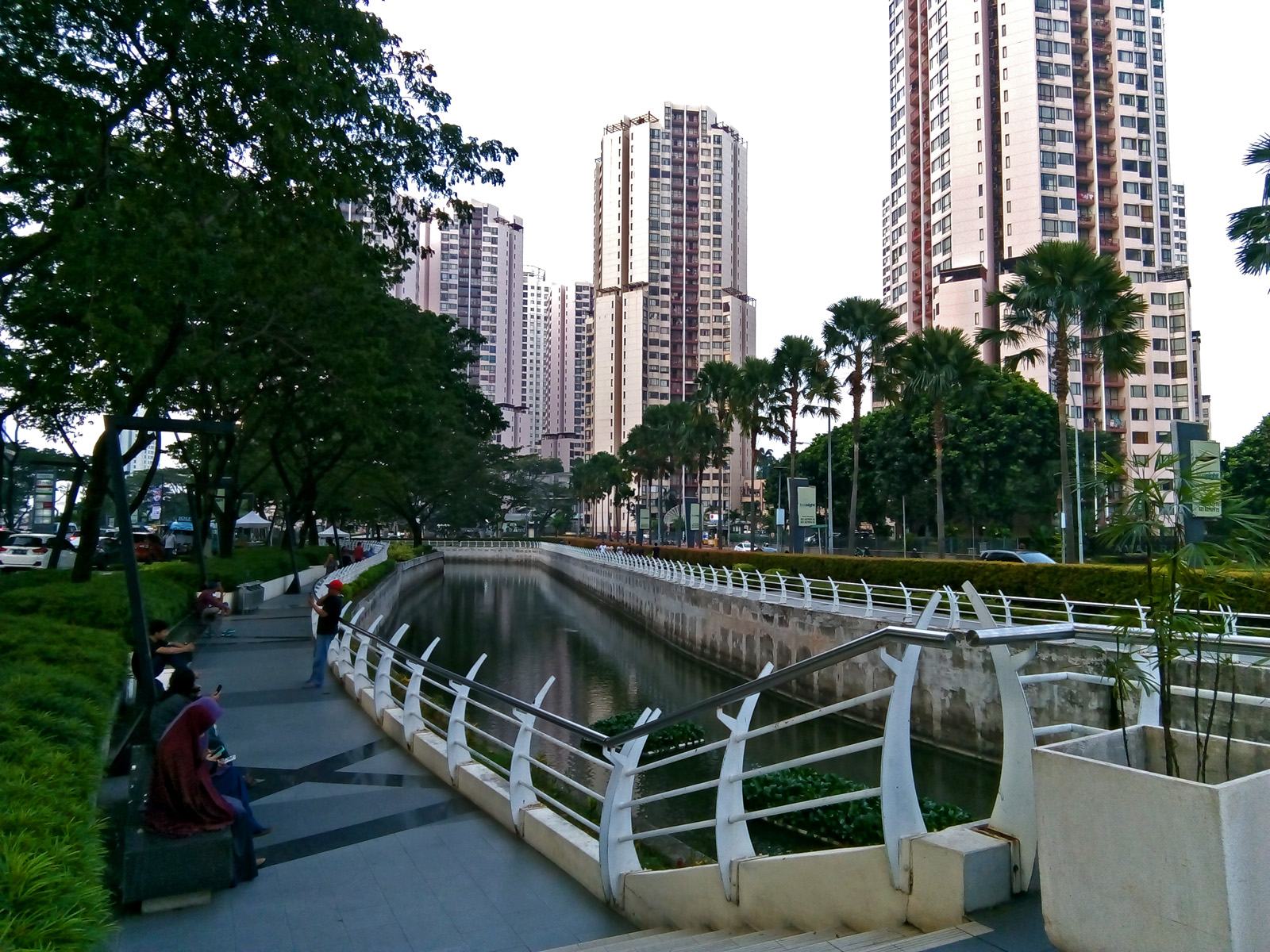
Epiwalk, in Rasuna Epicentrum Area

- Mega Kuningan is an area of densely concentrated high rise buildings within Golden Triangle of Jakarta, (Indonesian: Segitiga Emas Jakarta), which again a triangular area of business and commercial establishments, is located in Setiabudi District. The 2003 JW Marriott hotel bombing, the 2004 Australian embassy bombing in Jakarta, and the 2009 JW Marriott - Ritz-Carlton bombings occurred within Mega Kuningan.
- Rasuna Epicentrum is an area filled with high-rise buildings with a total area of 53.6 hectares, consisting of residential, offices, hotels, hospitals, places of worship, sports, shopping and entertainment and education all in one area.
- Pasar Rumput Market

== Manggarai Bus Terminal ==
Manggarai Bus Terminal, which opened on 16 April 2014, is integrated with TransJakarta corridor and KRL Jabodetabek Commuter Line with skywalk.
