= Menara Jakarta at Kemayoran =

Coordinates: 6.148136°S 106.846252°E

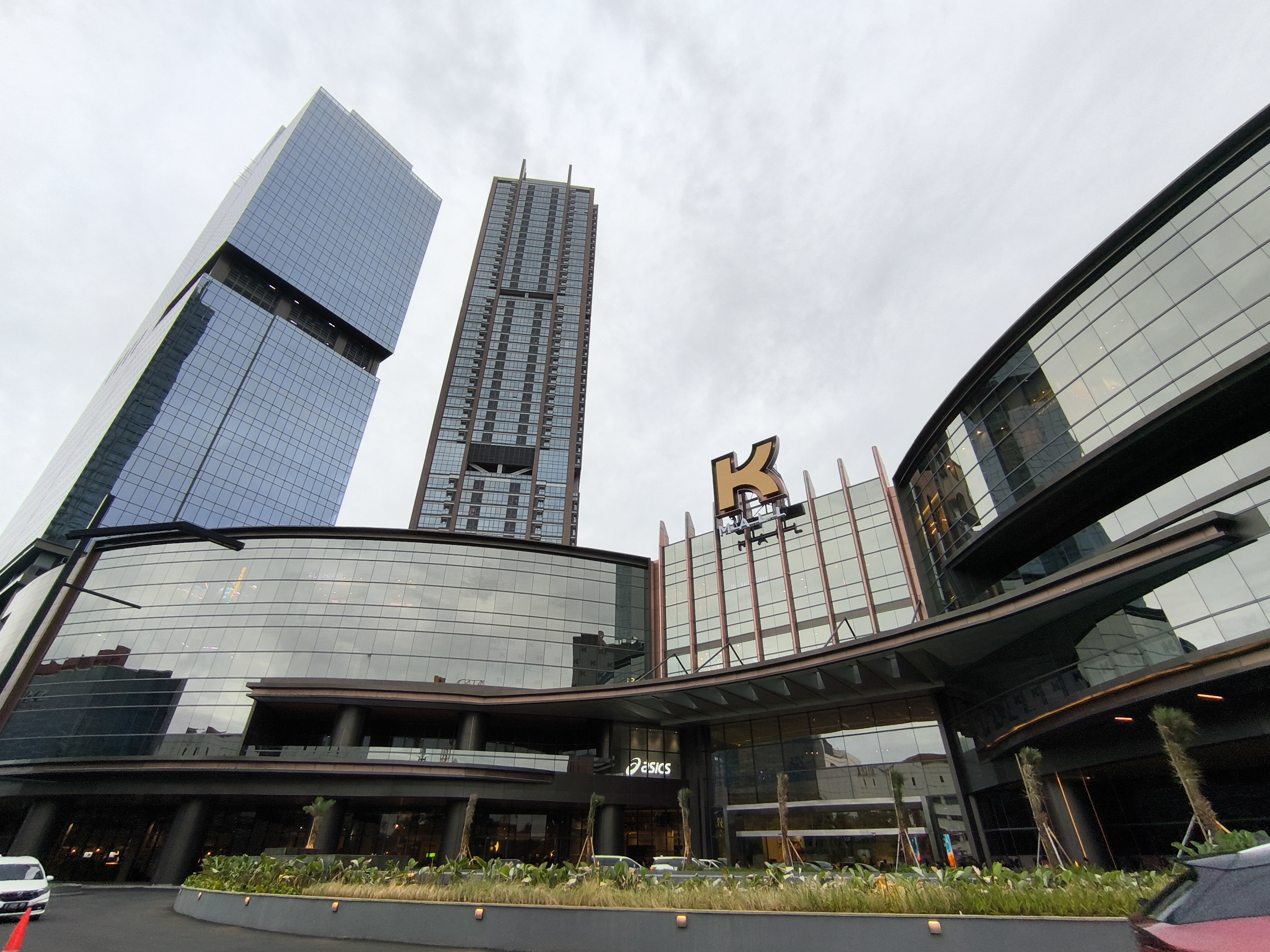
- Front view of the shopping mall
- Interactive map of the Menara Jakarta at Kemayoran area

General information
- Type: Hotel; Commercial offices Residential; Shopping mall
- Architectural style: Modern
- Location: Jl. Pekan Raya, Kemayoran, Jakarta, Indonesia
- Construction started: 2017
- Completed: 2025

Height
- Architectural: Azure Tower – 200 m (660 ft); Equinox Tower – 180 m (590 ft)

Technical details
- Floor count: Azure Tower – 55; Equinox Tower – 52; Fortune Tower – 34

Design and construction
- Developer: Agung Sedayu Group

Other information
- Public transit access: JIEXPO Kemayoran

Menara Jakarta is a mixed development complex at Kemayoran, Jakarta, Indonesia. Located in front of JIEXPO, it consists of six towers, 1 Conho (Condo & Hotel), 1 Condo Tower, 1 Office Tower, and 3 Suite Tower. The complex also has a mall named K Mall at Menara Jakarta, which opened on 11 November 2025. The complex is constructed on the site of postponed Jakarta Tower.

The towers of this complex are named as Fortune Tower, Azure Tower, Celestial Tower, Breeze Tower, Equinox Tower, and Destiny Tower.

The office tower in the complex is known as Fortune Tower, which will be a skyscraper of 140-160 meters tall at the tip. It includes facilities such as Sky Garden, Sky Lounge & Restaurant and a 360' Sky Observatory.

== See also ==
- List of tallest buildings in Indonesia
  - List of tallest buildings in Jakarta
