= JIEXPO Kemayoran (Transjakarta) =

Bus rapid transit station in Jakarta, Indonesia

14 05 JIEXPO Kemayoran
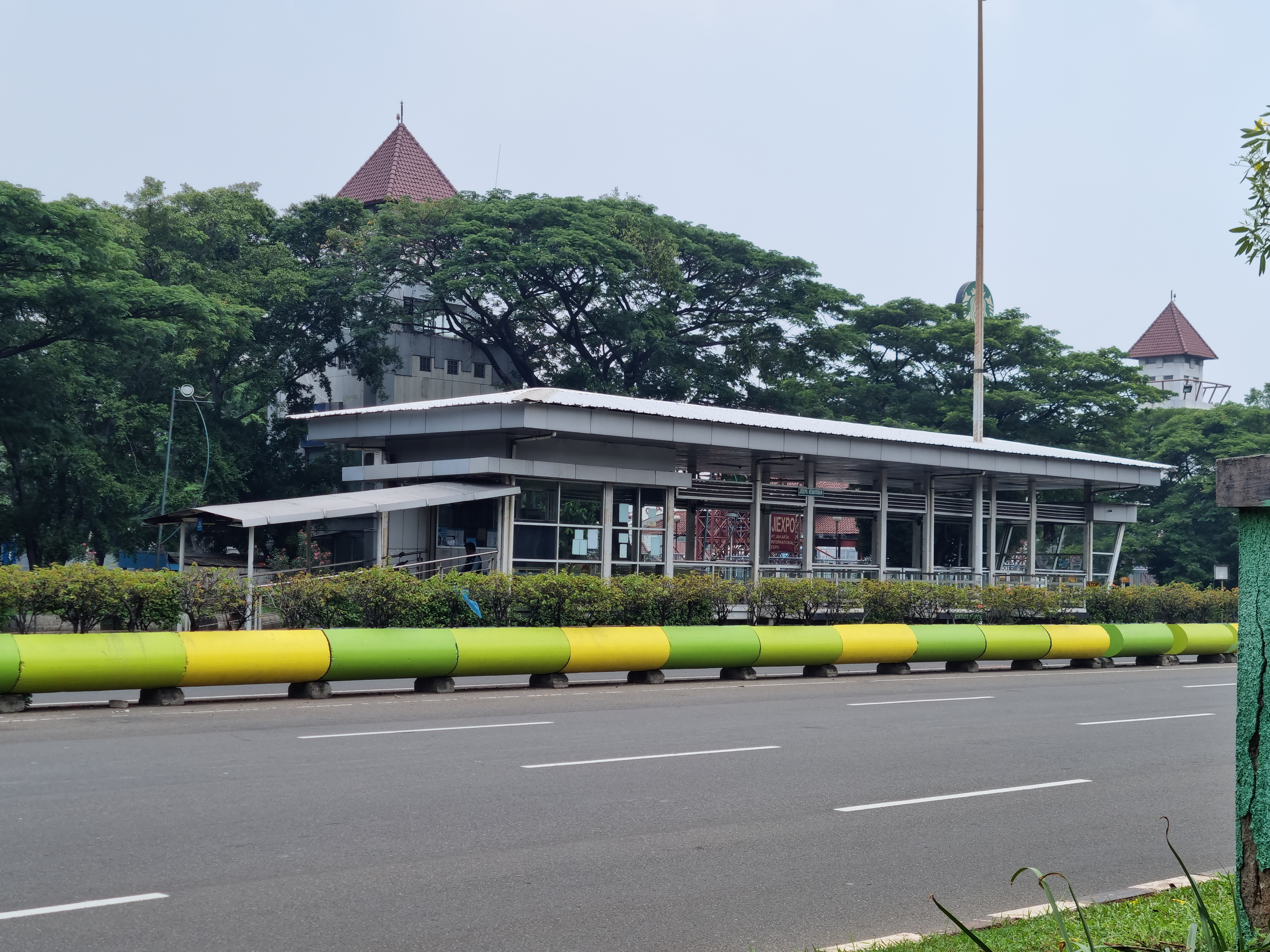
- Southeast view of the station

General information
- Location: Benyamin Sueb St., East Pademangan, Pademangan, North Jakarta, Jakarta, Indonesia
- Coordinates: 6.14484°S 106.84865°E
- System: Transjakarta
- Owner: Transjakarta
- Operator: Transjakarta
- Lines: List of TransJakarta corridors#Corridor 14
- Platforms: Single side platform

Construction
- Structure type: At-grade
- Cycle facilities: No
- Accessible: Yes

History
- Opened: 29 May 2015 (seasonal operations); 23 August 2024 (full operations)

Services
| Preceding | | Following |
|---|---|---|
| Kemayoran One-way operation | Corridor 14 | Landasan Pacu towards Jakarta International Stadium |
Location

JIEXPO Kemayoran is a Transjakarta bus rapid transit station located east of the Jakarta International Expo (JIEXPO, hence the name) compound at Benyamin Sueb street in Pademangan, Jakarta, Indonesia, serving northbound Corridor 14 buses one way towards Jakarta International Stadium.

Until 2024, the station only operates to serve seasonal routes during the annual Jakarta Fair (Indonesian: Pekan Raya Jakarta, PRJ) and/or other Transjakarta-sponsored events taking place in JIEXPO. Since 23 August 2024, JIEXPO Kemayoran BRT station began to cater northbond Corridor 14 and operate regularly like most of its kind.

== History ==
On 28 May 2015, Transjakarta announced the operational of Jakarta Fair-exclusive special route connecting JIEXPO and Monumen Nasional BRT station. The BRT station outside of the venue's eastern gate had been prepared as the northern termini. The Monas–JIEXPO route and its termini station was launched in the opening day of the 2015 Jakarta Fair on 29 May, and were closed together with the closing of the fair on 5 July. Since then, the BRT station only operates during the Jakarta Fair and/or other events sponsored by Transjakarta.

The Monas–JIEXPO route was the sole exclusive route to the Jakarta Fair until three new routes were launched in 2017, connecting Kampung Melayu (PRJ1), Cililitan (PRJ2) and Pulo Gadung (PRJ3); the existing Monas–JIEXPO route was labeled as route 2C at the same time. As of 2026, the Cililitan–JIEXPO route was decommissioned, with the Kampung Melayu–JIEXPO route bearing the PRJ2 label.

On 23 August 2024, JIEXPO Kemayoran BRT station began to serve northbound Corridor 14 buses towards Jakarta International Stadium. Thus, the station has since began fully operating in a regular 24/7 schedule like other stations across the Transjakarta system.

== Station layout ==
West
Side platform, the doors are opened on the left side of the bus travel direction
| East | to Jakarta International Stadium (Landasan Pacu) ⤴ |

== Non-BRT bus services ==
| Service type | Route | Destination | Notes |
|---|---|---|---|
| Inner city feeder | | Ancol → Blok M | Inside the station |
| Jakarta Fair feeder | | JIEXPO Kemayoran–Balai Kota | Only operates during the Jakarta Fair and/or other events at the Jakarta International Expo Inside the station |
| Jakarta Fair feeder | | JIEXPO Kemayoran–Kampung Melayu | Only operates during the Jakarta Fair and/or other events at the Jakarta International Expo Inside the station |
| Jakarta Fair feeder | | JIEXPO Kemayoran–Pulo Gadung | Only operates during the Jakarta Fair and/or other events at the Jakarta International Expo Inside the station |
| Mikrotrans Jak Lingko | JAK-118 | Taman Waduk Papanggo–Kota Tua | Outside the station |

== Nearby places ==
- Jakarta International Expo
- Golf Residence Kemayoran
- The Royale Springhill Residences
- Menara Jakarta at Kemayoran
  - K Mall at Menara Jakarta

== Incident ==
On 30 April 2017, a Transjakarta staff member at JIEXPO Kemayoran station was attacked by four sharp-armed robbers during his late-night shift around 01:00 local time. The culprits managed to steal the victim's phone, leaving him to be wounded in the right hand and left back.

== Gallery ==
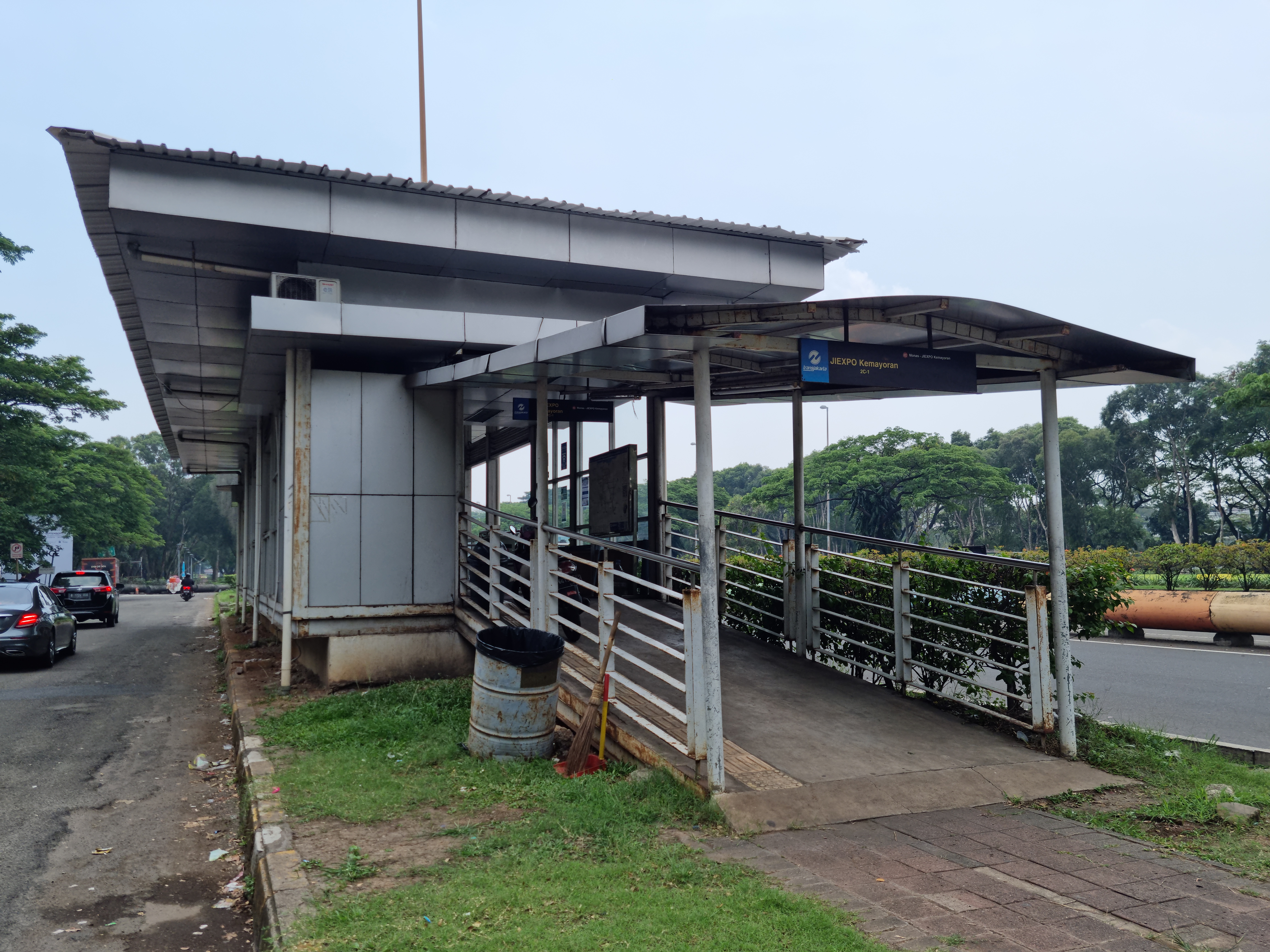
Entrance at the south end of the building

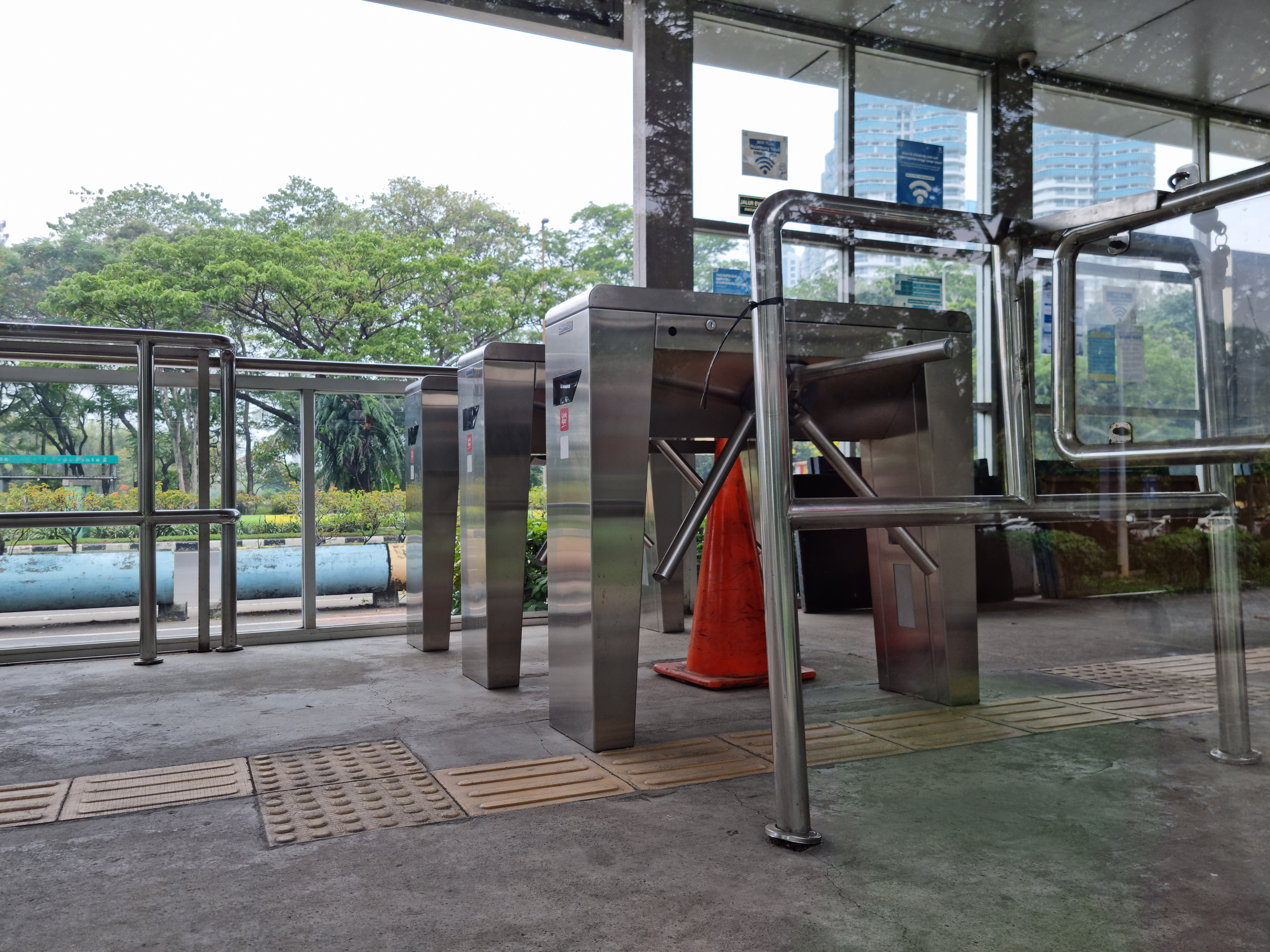
Entrance/exit turnstiles

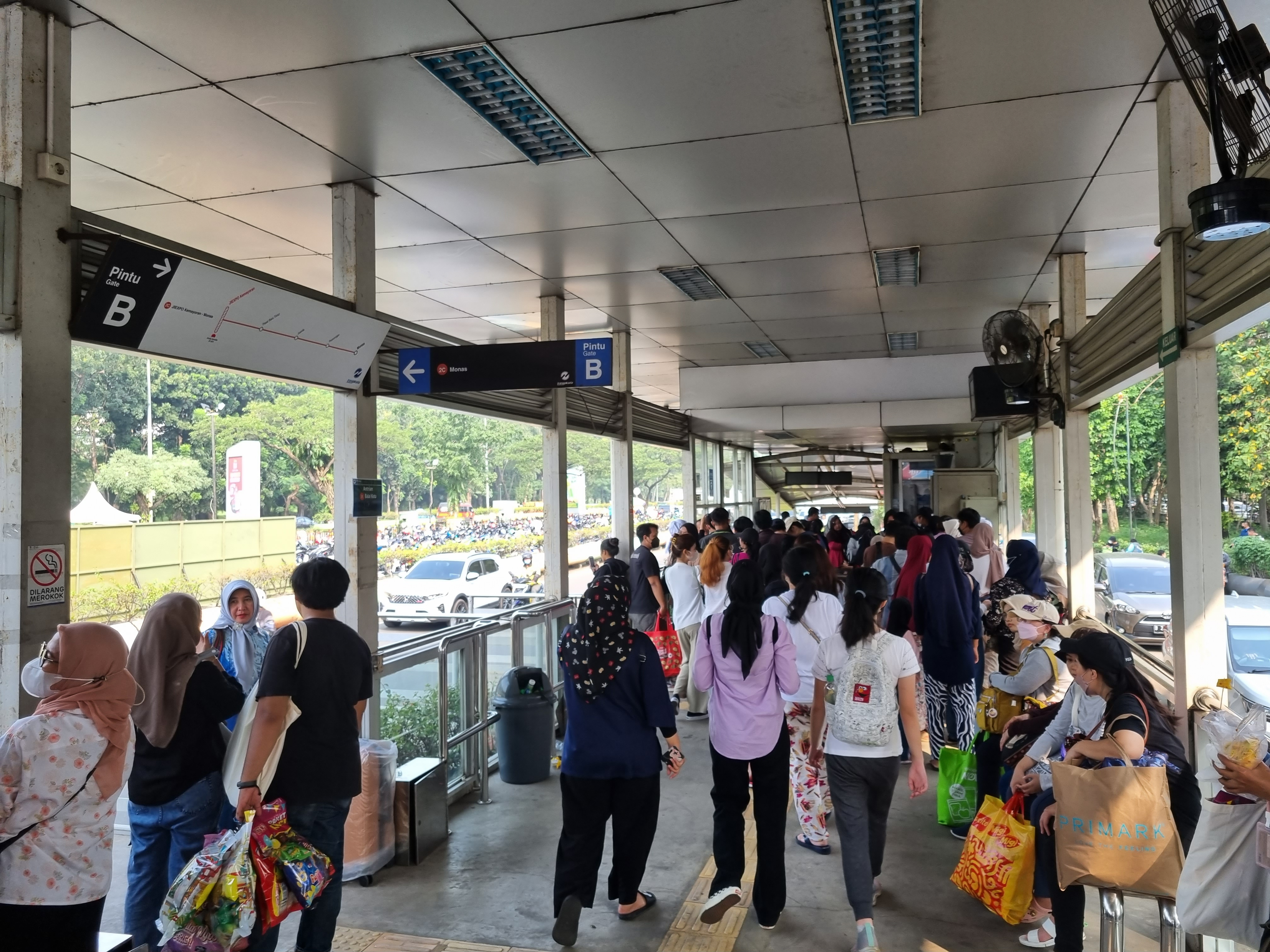
Inner view looking south
