= Transport in Jakarta =

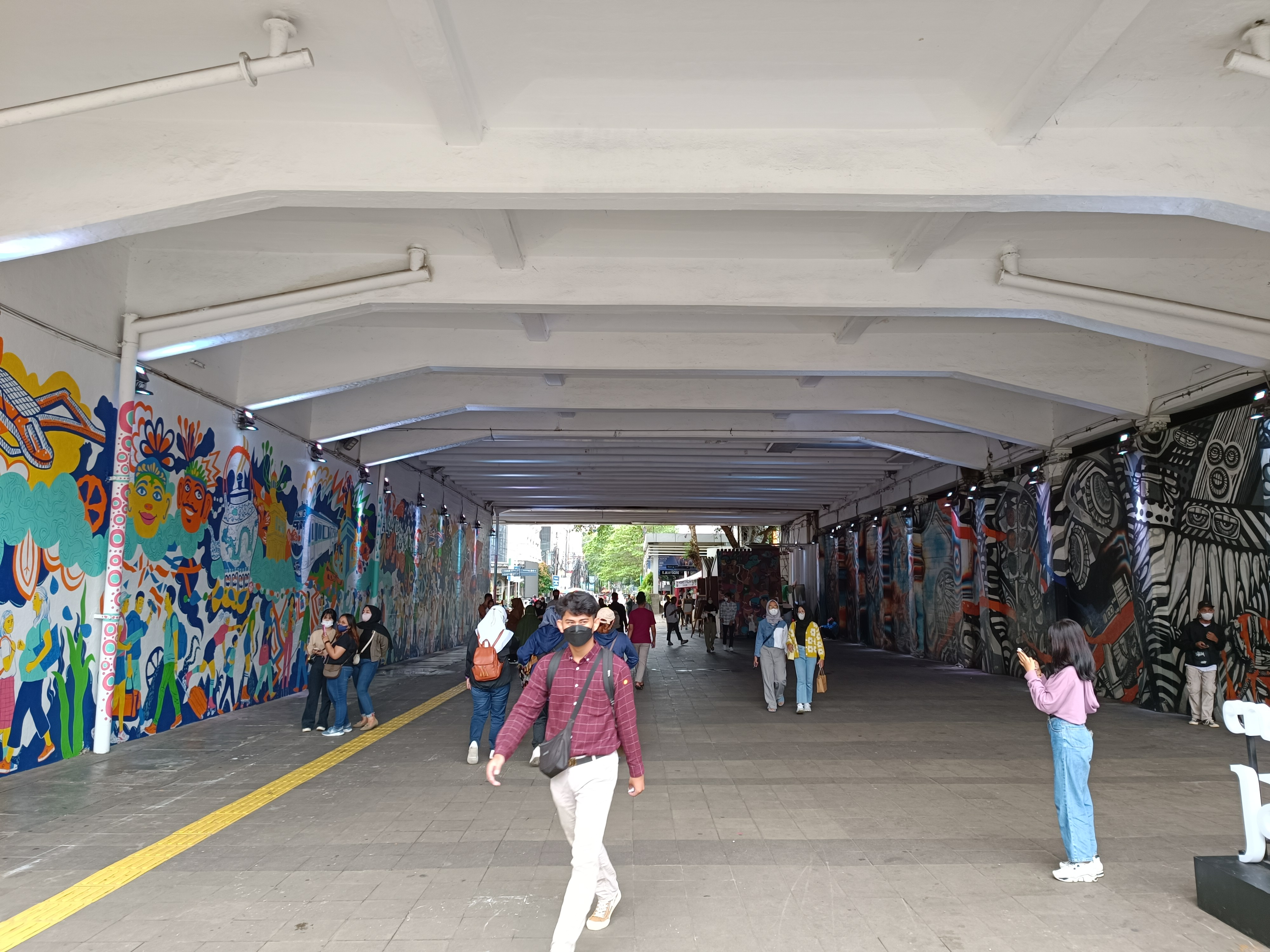
- People walking at Dukuh Atas TOD

Overview
- Locale: Greater Jakarta
- Transit type: Commuter rail, metro, light metro, people mover, bus rapid transit and bus, angkot, taxicab, motorcycle taxi, bajaj, private automobile, bicycle, pedestrian

As a metropolitan area of about 42 million people, Jakarta has a variety of transport systems. Jakarta was awarded 2021 global Sustainable Transport Award (STA) for integrated public transportation system. However, the Jakarta public transport system remains severely underdeveloped compared to the size of the city.

The city prioritized development of road networks, which were mostly designed to accommodate private vehicles. A notable feature of Jakarta's present road system is the toll road network. Composed of an inner and outer ring road and five toll roads radiating outwards, the network provides inner as well as outer city connections. An 'odd-even' policy limits road use to cars with either odd or even-numbered registration plates on a particular day as a transitional measure to alleviate traffic congestion until the future introduction of electronic road pricing.

There are many bus terminals in the city, from where buses operate on numerous routes to connect neighborhoods within the city limit, to other areas of Greater Jakarta and to cities across the island of Java. The biggest of the bus terminal is Pulo Gebang Bus Terminal, which is arguably the largest of its kind in Southeast Asia. Main terminus for long distance train services are Gambir and Pasar Senen. Whoosh High-speed railways is connecting Jakarta to Bandung and another one is at the planning stage from Jakarta to Surabaya.

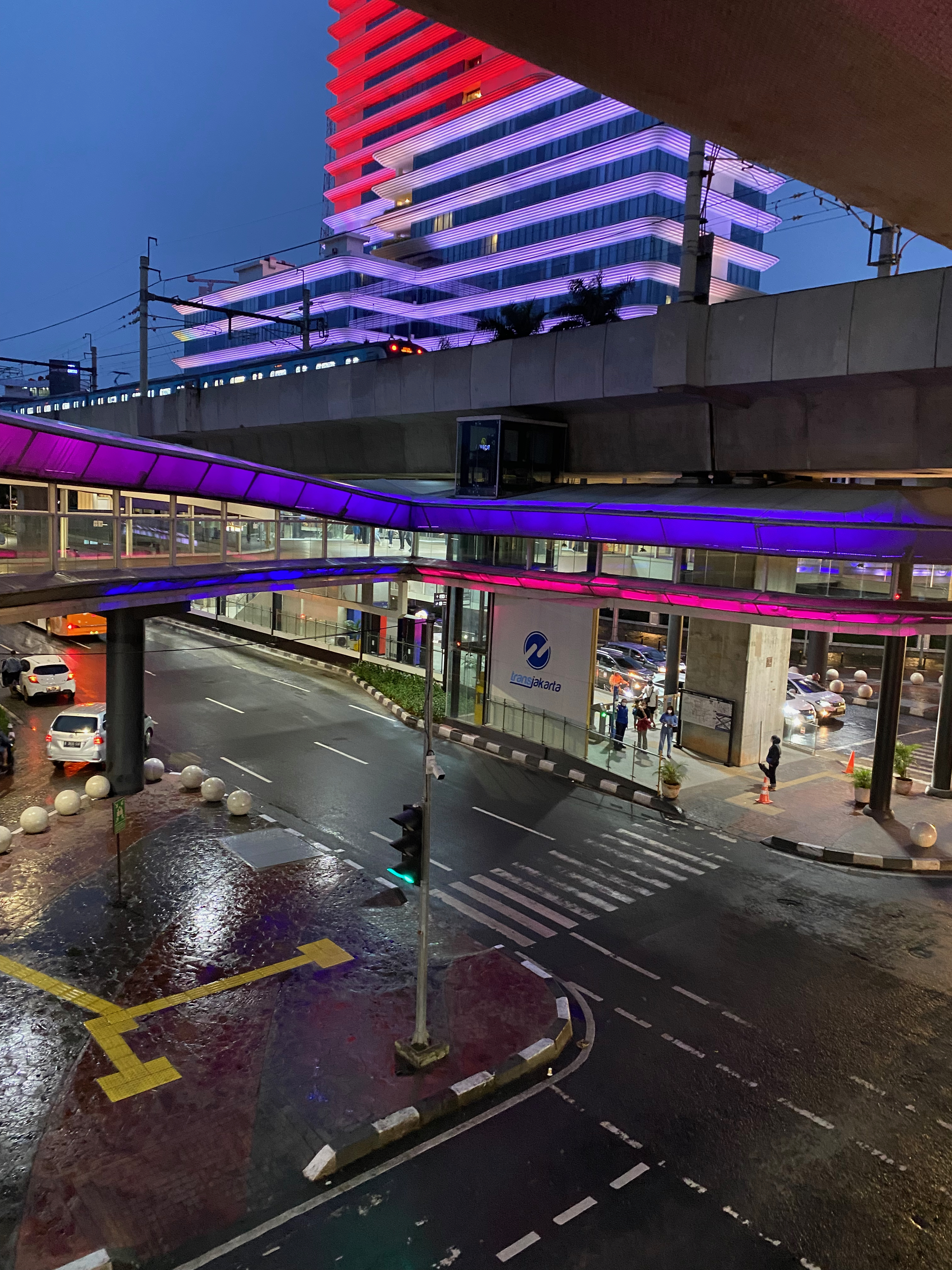
A skybridge at CSW-ASEAN TOD

As of September 2023, Jakarta's public transport service coverage has reached 86 percent, which is targeted to increase to 95 percent. Rapid transit in Greater Jakarta consists of TransJakarta bus rapid transit, Jakarta LRT, Jakarta MRT, KRL Commuterline, Jabodebek LRT, and Soekarno-Hatta Airport Rail Link. The city administration is building transit oriented development like Dukuh Atas TOD and CSW-ASEAN TOD in several area across Jakarta to facilitate commuters to transfer between different mode of public transportation.

Previously, privately owned bus systems like Kopaja, MetroMini, Mayasari Bakti and PPD also provide important services for Jakarta commuters with numerous routes throughout the city, many of them have since been replaced by Minitrans and Metrotrans buses or Mikrotrans microbuses or absorbed into TransJakarta. Pedicabs are banned from the city for causing traffic congestion. Bajaj auto rickshaw provide local transportation in the back streets of some parts of the city. Angkot microbuses also play a major role in road transport of Jakarta. Taxicabs and ojeks (motorcycle taxis) are available in the city. As of January 2023, about 2.6 million people use public transportation daily in Jakarta.

The city administration has undertaken a project to build about 500 kilometers of bicycle lanes. As of June 2021, Jakarta already has 63 kilometers of bicycle lanes, and another 101 kilometers will be added by the end of the year 2021.

Soekarno–Hatta International Airport (CGK) is the main airport serving the Greater Jakarta area, while Halim Perdanakusuma Airport (HLP) accommodates private and some commercial domestic flights. Other airports in the Jakarta metropolitan area include Pondok Cabe Airport and an airfield on Pulau Panjang, part of the Thousand Island archipelago.

Indonesia's busiest and Jakarta's main seaport Tanjung Priok serves many ferry connections to different parts of Indonesia. The old port Sunda Kelapa only accommodate pinisi, a traditional two-masted wooden sailing ship serving inter-island freight service in the archipelago. Muara Angke is used as a public port to Thousand Islands, while Marina Ancol is used as a tourist port.

For payment method in public transportation (for KRL Commuterline, Transjakarta, LRT Jakarta, LRT Jabodebek, MRT Jakarta, and SHIA Airport rail link) already using cashless such as Jak Lingko. Travelers can use Jak Lingko card or Electronic money banking cards. The electronic money cards include those issued, which are:

- BRIZZI (issued by Bank BRI)
- TapCash (issued by Bank BNI)
- e-Money (issued by Bank Mandiri)
- Flazz (issued by Bank BCA)
- Jakcard (issued by Bank Jakarta)

The electronic banking cards is integrated cad can be accepted in KAI Commuter line, TransJakarta, LRT Jakarta, LRT Jabodebek, MRT Jakarta, eToll payment and parking payment. The electronic bank card can be bought in Bank Branch office or in e-commerce.

For the electronic banking card Top Up can be done at:

- Indomaret Outlet (convenience store).
- Alfamart Outlet (convenience store).
- Alfamidi Outlet (convenience store).
- Bright Store Outlet (convenience store).
- e-Money Card Vending Machine.
- ATM machines and NFC-enabled mobile banking.

Jakarta is part of the Maritime Silk Road that runs from the Chinese coast via the Suez Canal to the Mediterranean and there to the Upper Adriatic region.

== Usage shares ==
As of 2015, about 1.4 million commuters travel into the city center from the outskirts of Jakarta. Based on the survey, 58 percent of these commuters use motorcycles, 12.8 percent use cars and only 27 percent use public transportation. In 2004, a study was undertaken to prepare a master plan for an integrated public transport system within Greater Jakarta, which revealed the mode of transport among city dwellers. The city's 9.5% average annual growth rate of motorized vehicles far exceeds the 0.01% increase in road length between 2005 and 2010. As of 2010, public transportation in Jakarta serves only 56% of commuter trips.

== Road transport ==
=== Streets and highways ===
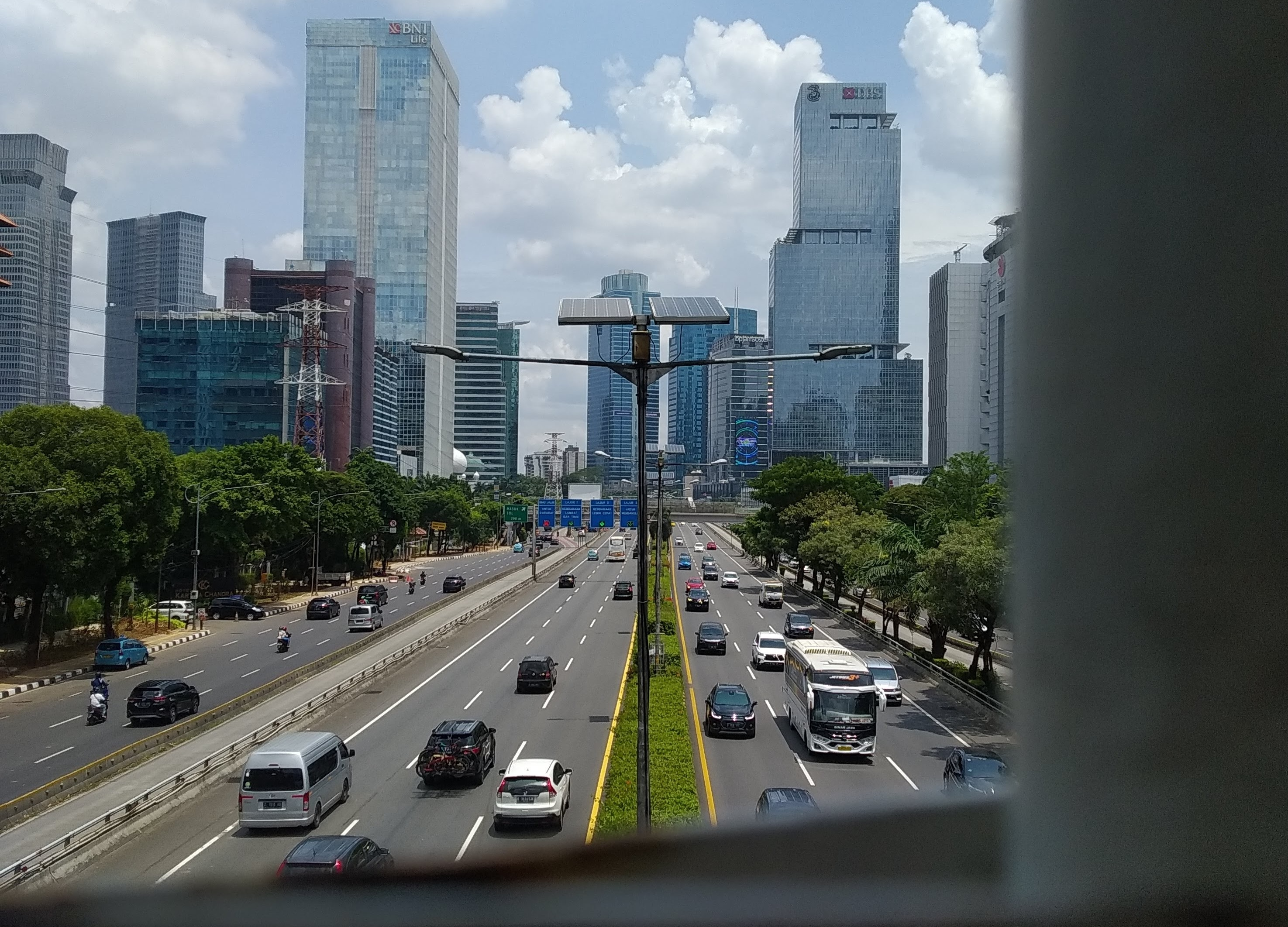
Part of Jakarta Inner Ring Road or Jalan Tol Lingkar Dalam Jakarta in Kuningan, South Jakarta

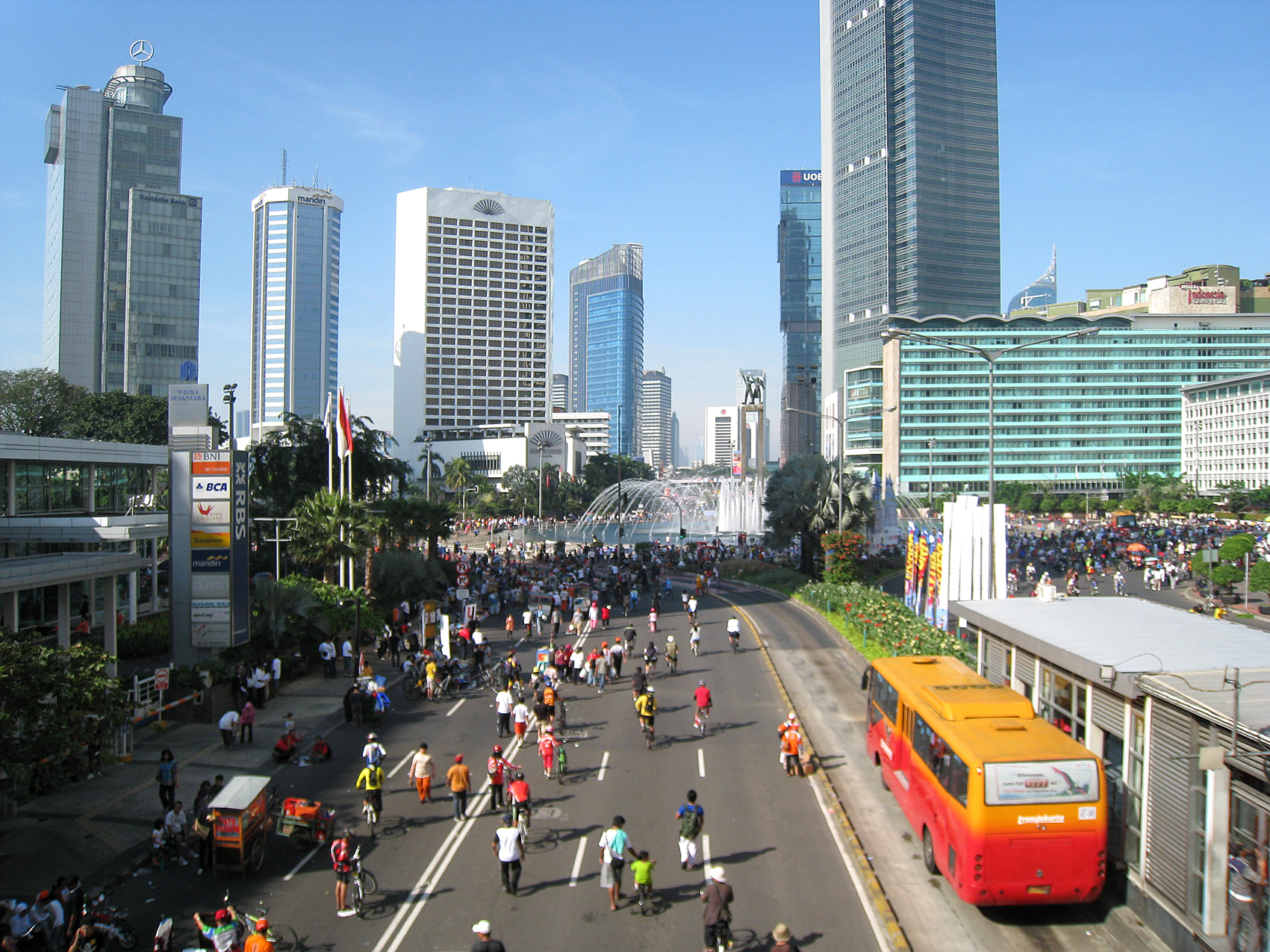
Jakarta pedestrians, joggers and bicyclists take over the main avenue during Car-Free Day

During the Dutch colonial era, a structured road network connecting most major cities throughout Java was developed as a part of the Java Great Post Road by former Governor-General H.W. Daendels. The network was built in the early 19th century, and although the network was later expanded to a great extent, it could not keep up with the rapidly increasing numbers of motorized vehicles, resulting in highly congested traffic. The city prioritized development of road networks, which were mostly designed to accommodate private vehicles.

A notable feature of Jakarta's present road system is the toll road network. Composed of an inner and outer ring road and six toll roads radiating outwards, the network provides inner as well as outer city connections. Jakarta Outer Ring Road 2 is an under-construction toll road encircling greater Jakarta area, parallel with Jakarta Outer Ring Road (JORR 1).

The six radiating toll roads are:

- Prof. Dr. Ir. Soedijatmo Toll Road linking to Soekarno–Hatta International Airport
- Jakarta–Tangerang Toll Road linking to Tangerang and further to Merak in the west
- Jakarta–Serpong Toll Road linking to Serpong
- Depok-Antasari Toll Road linking to Depok and planned to go further to Bogor
- Jagorawi Toll Road linking to Bogor and Ciawi in the south
- Jakarta–Cikampek Toll Road linking to Bekasi and Cikampek in the east

The city's 9.5% average annual growth rate of motorized vehicles far exceeded the 0.01% increase in road length between 2005 and 2010. In 2018, over 13 million motorcycles and 4.4 million cars used the roads of Jakarta. In 2019, there were about 88 million movements per day in the Greater Jakarta area, and public transportation accounts for only 30% of commuter trips. According to the National Development Planning Agency (Bappenas) traffic congestion in Greater Jakarta causes a waste of about $7.4 billion each year.

Throughout the years, several attempts have been made to reduce traffic congestion on Jakarta's main arteries. Implemented solutions include a 'three-in-one' rush-hour law, during which cars with fewer than three passengers are prohibited from driving on the main avenues. However, "car jockeys" were paid by commuters to ride into the center of the city to permit the use of three-in-one roads. Another example is the ban on trucks passing main avenues during the day. In 2016, 'odd-even' policy was introduced which designated cars with either odd or even-numbered registration plates on a particular day. This aims to function as a transitional measure to alleviate traffic congestion until the future introduction of Electronic Road Pricing which would be more effective.

Due to the city's acute gridlock, the Jakarta administration has decided to implement Electronic Road Pricing in 10 districts: Tanah Abang, Menteng, Setiabudi, Tebet, Matraman, Senen, Gambir, Tambora, Sawah Besar and Taman Sari. The ERP is planned to be implemented in the three-in-one zone and along Jl. Rasuna Said. The ERP system is expected to be operational by 2019 along with the opening of the Jakarta MRT. Implementation of the ERP system is planned to take place in two phases; the first will be for vehicles moving from the Senayan traffic circle to the Hotel Indonesia traffic circle while the second will be installed from the HI traffic circle to Jl. Medan Merdeka Barat.

=== Bus service ===
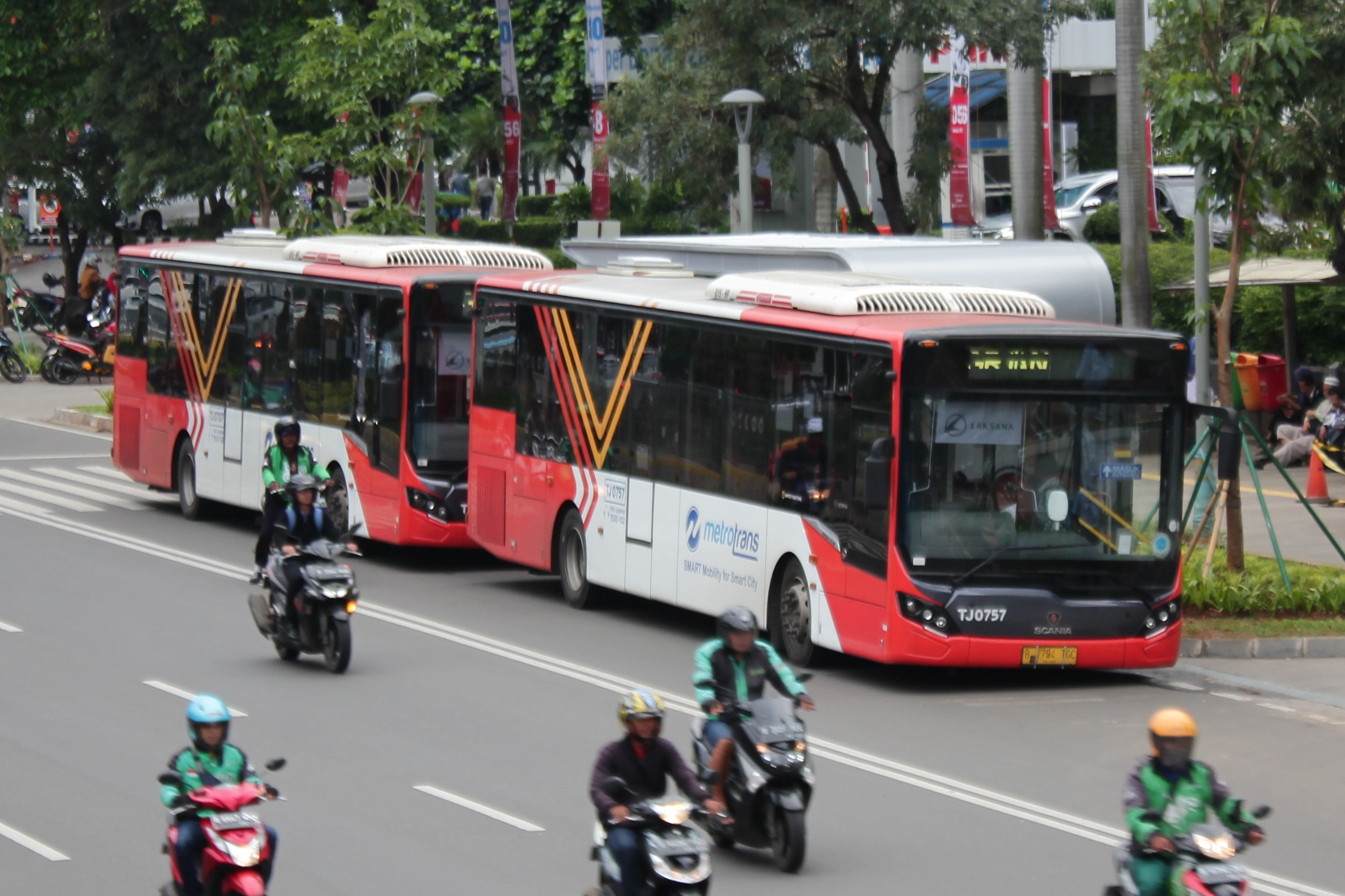
A Metrotrans bus at Senayan

There are many bus terminals in the city, from where buses operate on numerous routes to connect neighborhoods within the city limit, to other areas of Greater Jakarta area and to cities across the island of Java. The biggest of the bus terminal is Pulo Gebang Bus Terminal, which is arguably the largest of its kind in Southeast Asia. Besides TransJakarta, other private owned bus systems like Mayasari Bakti and PPD also provide important services for Jakarta commuters with numerous routes throughout the city. Since January 2013, Jakarta Government has integrated these services with TransJakarta feeder bus routes. Many routes are replaced by Minitrans and Metrotrans buses.

=== Traditional transports ===
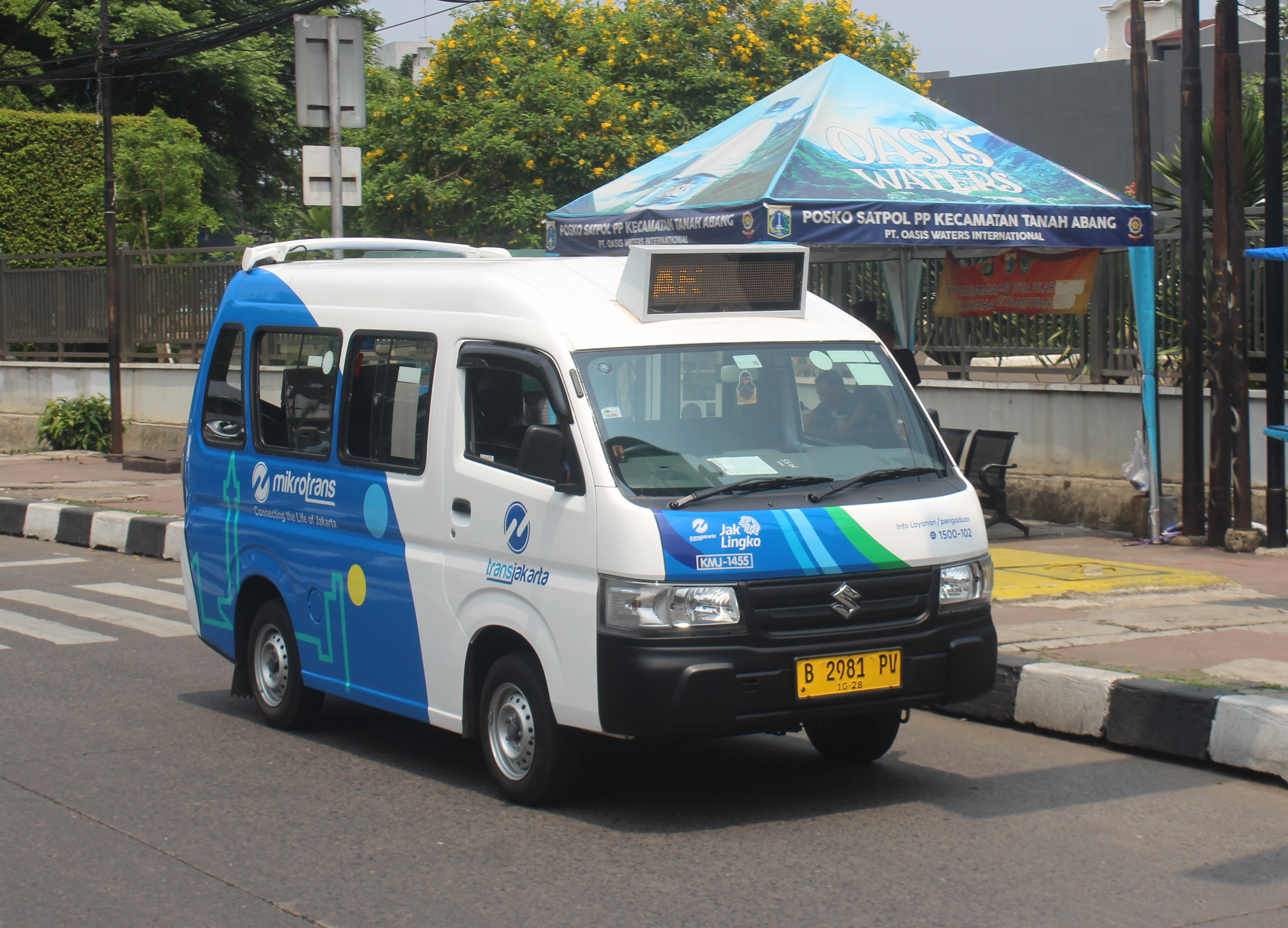
Mikrotrans microbus (angkot) operated by Transjakarta

In 1966, an estimated 160 thousand pedicabs (becak) operated in the city; as much as 15% of Jakarta's total workforce was engaged in becak driving. In 1971, becaks were banned from major roads, and shortly thereafter the government attempted a total ban, which substantially reduced their numbers but did not eliminate them. A campaign to eliminate them succeeded in 1990 and 1991, but during the economic crisis of 1998, some returned amid less effective government attempts to control them. Becaks were banned because they caused traffic congestion and they were seen as the exploitation of humans by other humans. Becaks were replaced by bemo, betor, helicak, minicar, and bajaj. In 2018, Governor Anies Baswedan attempted to allow becaks again because of a political contract with becak drivers during his campaign. Most cycle rickshaw drivers in the 1980s were former landless agricultural laborers from rural areas of Java. As of March 2018, there are about 1,500 becaks in Jakarta.

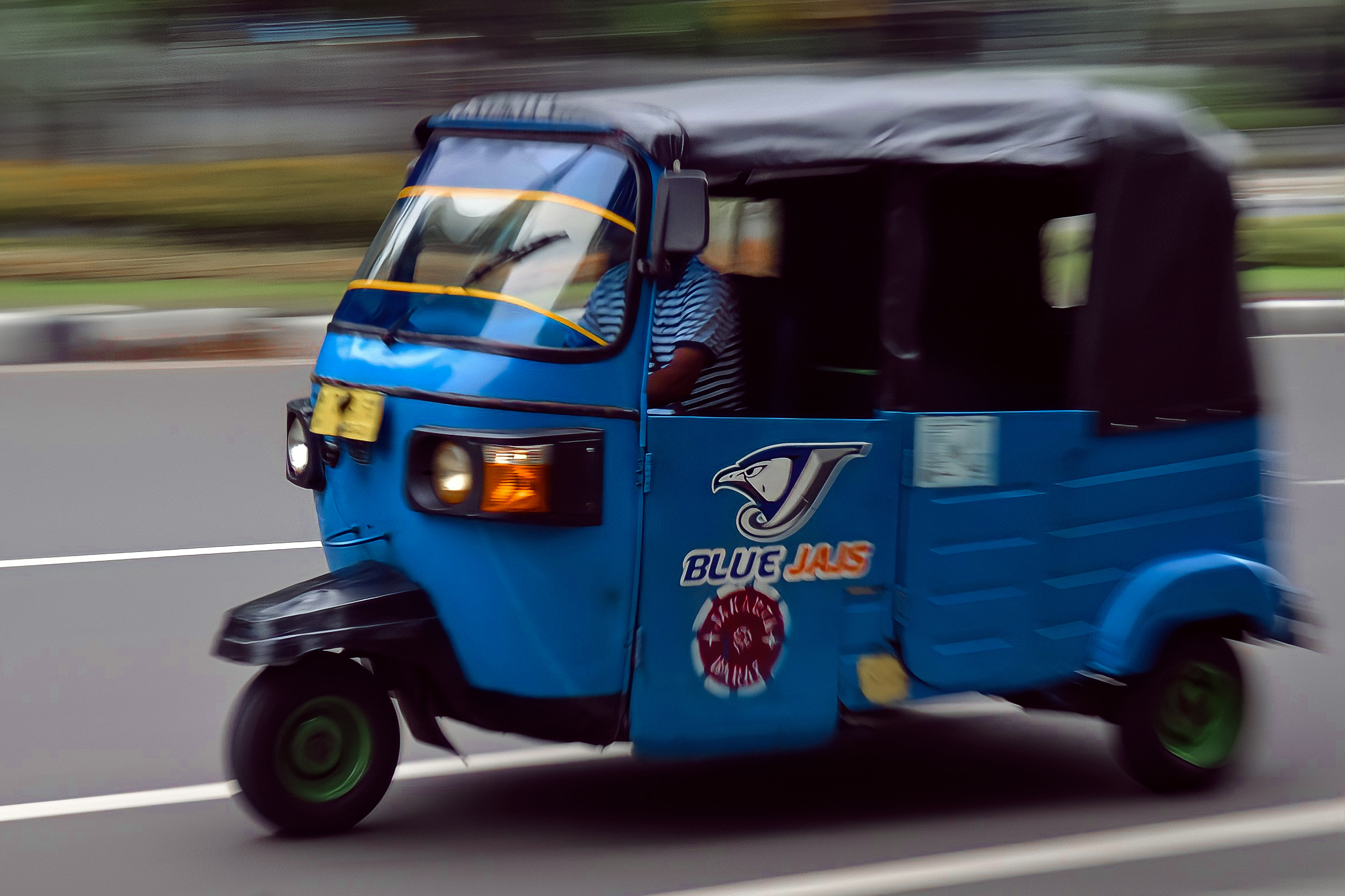
Compressed natural gas fuelled Bajaj in Jakarta.

Bajaj auto rickshaw provide local transportation in the back streets of some parts of the city. From the early 1940s to 1991 they were a common form of local transportation in the city. They are colored blue (for the ones which use Compressed natural gas) and orange (for the ones which use normal gasoline fuel). The blue ones are imported from India with the brand of Bajaj and TVS and the orange ones are the old design from 1990. The government is currently replacing the orange bajajs with the blue ones because blue bajajs are less polluting and the gas fuel is cheaper. Bemo was a three-wheeled vehicle similar to bajaj, which were eliminated in 1996 because they were old, too dangerous and cause much pollution, but they continued to exist until recently, when in 2017, Bajaj Qute was introduced to replace bemo. Angkot microbuses also play a major role in road transport of Jakarta. They operates in numerous routes to connect neighborhoods of the city.

=== Taxi cab ===
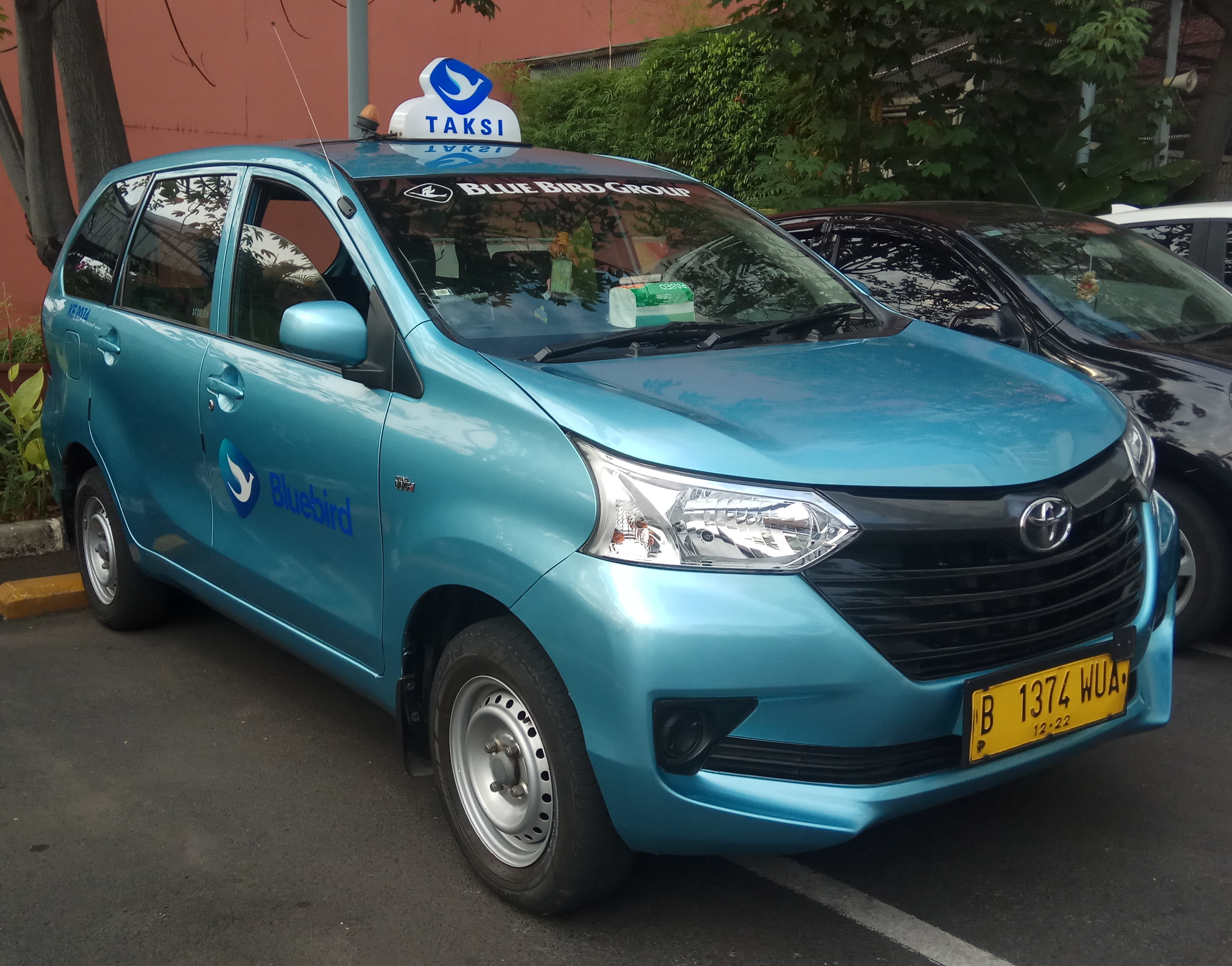
Toyota Avanza taxi, operated by Blue Bird.

Plenty of taxi cabs are available in the city. Many companies operate & maintain pools of different model of cars in their own brands. Go-Jek and Grab also have wide presence. Vehicle for hire companies accessible by mobile apps, known in Indonesia as taksi online (online taxi), has reduced the number of conventional taxi companies operating in Jakarta from 32 to 4 (Blue Bird, Express, Gamya, and Taxiku).

=== Motorcycle taxi/ojek ===
Although ojek are not an official form of public transport, they can be found throughout Indonesia and in Jakarta. They are especially useful when navigating crowded urban roads, narrow alleyways, heavy traffic and cramped locations that larger vehicles cannot reach. Most of the ojeks are operated by Gojek and Grab, in Indonesia called ojek online. Gojek was founded in 2011 so that ojek drivers who had been working with unpredictable income could operate professionally with better income, and its app was created in 2015.

=== Bicycle ===
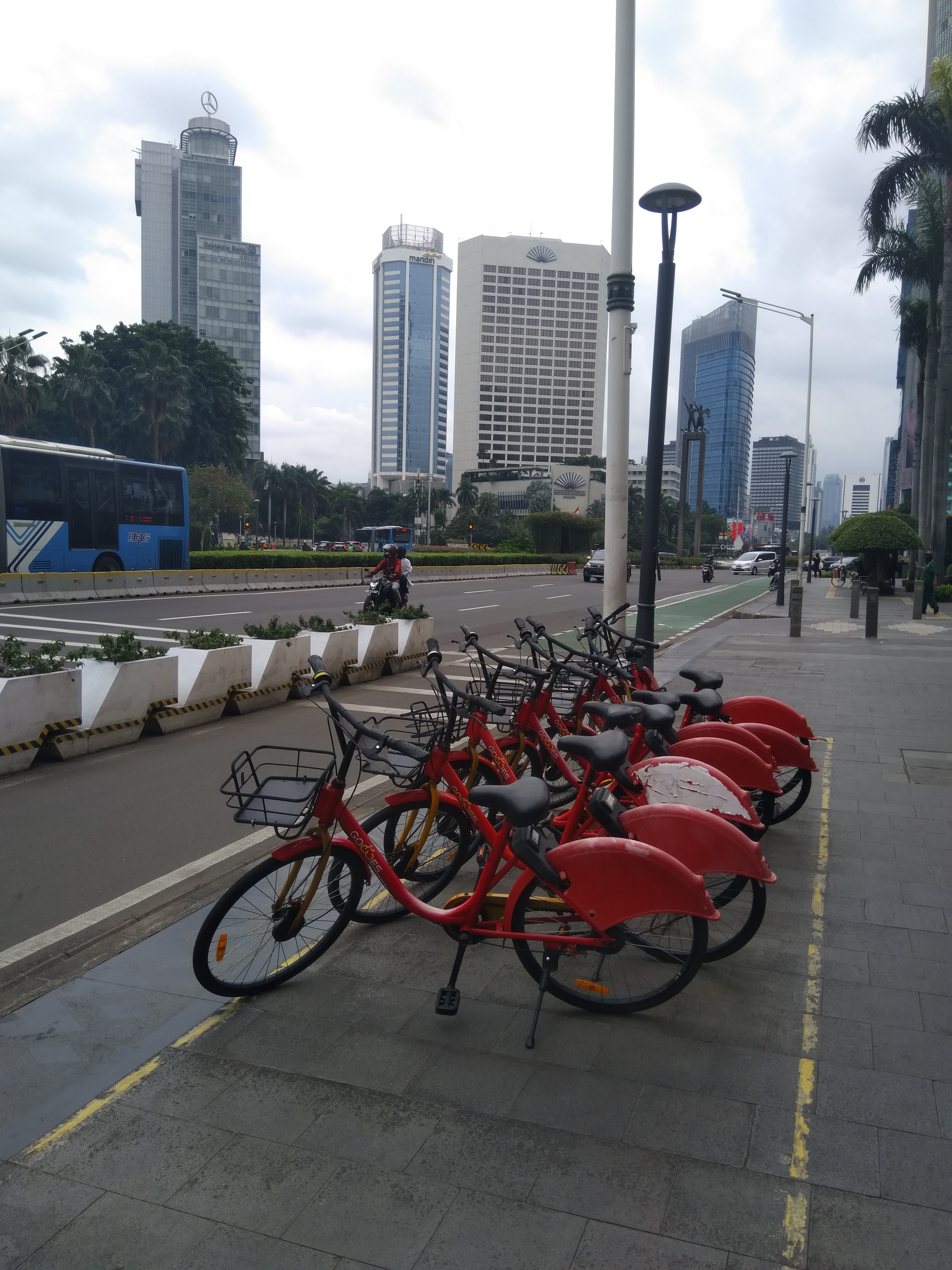
Gowes bike sharing station at Bundaran HI, Jakarta

There are bicycle taxis (ojek sepeda ontel) in the Kota Tua (Old City) region. However, the revenues are declining because of the popularity of ojek online. As of late 2023, Jakarta has 314 kilometers of separate bicycle lane, which will be extended to 535 kilometers by 2026. Bicycle-sharing company Gowes, which means "to paddle," in Indonesian, started operation in limited areas of Jakarta in 2018.

== Intercity Rail ==
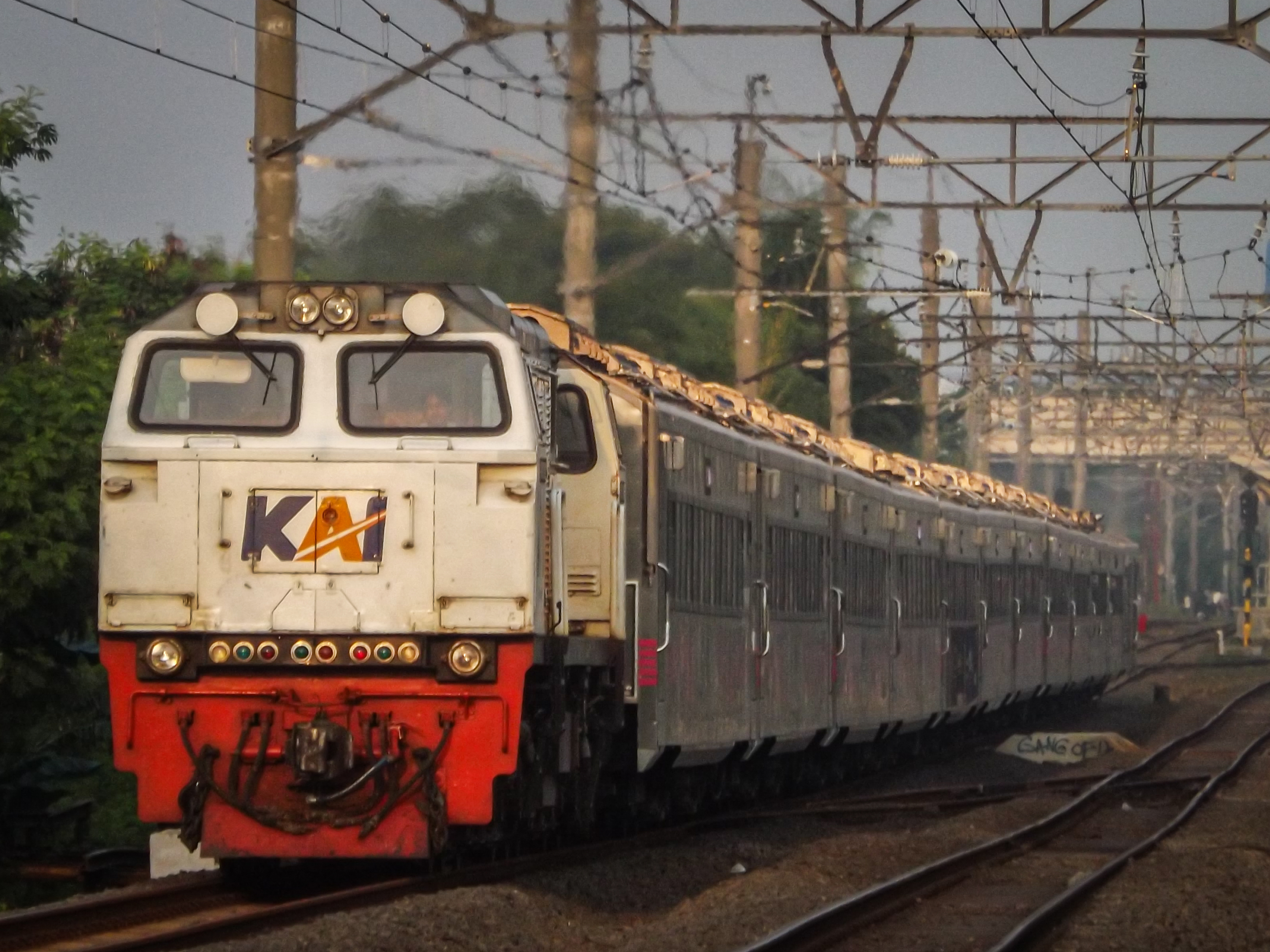
Argo Bromo Anggrek, a non-stop train connecting Jakarta and Surabaya

Long-distance railways and local tram services were first introduced during the Dutch colonial era. While the trams were replaced with buses in the post-colonial era, long-distance railways continued to connect the city to its neighboring regions as well as cities throughout the island of Java. Main terminus for long distance train services are Gambir and Pasar Senen.

=== High speed rail ===
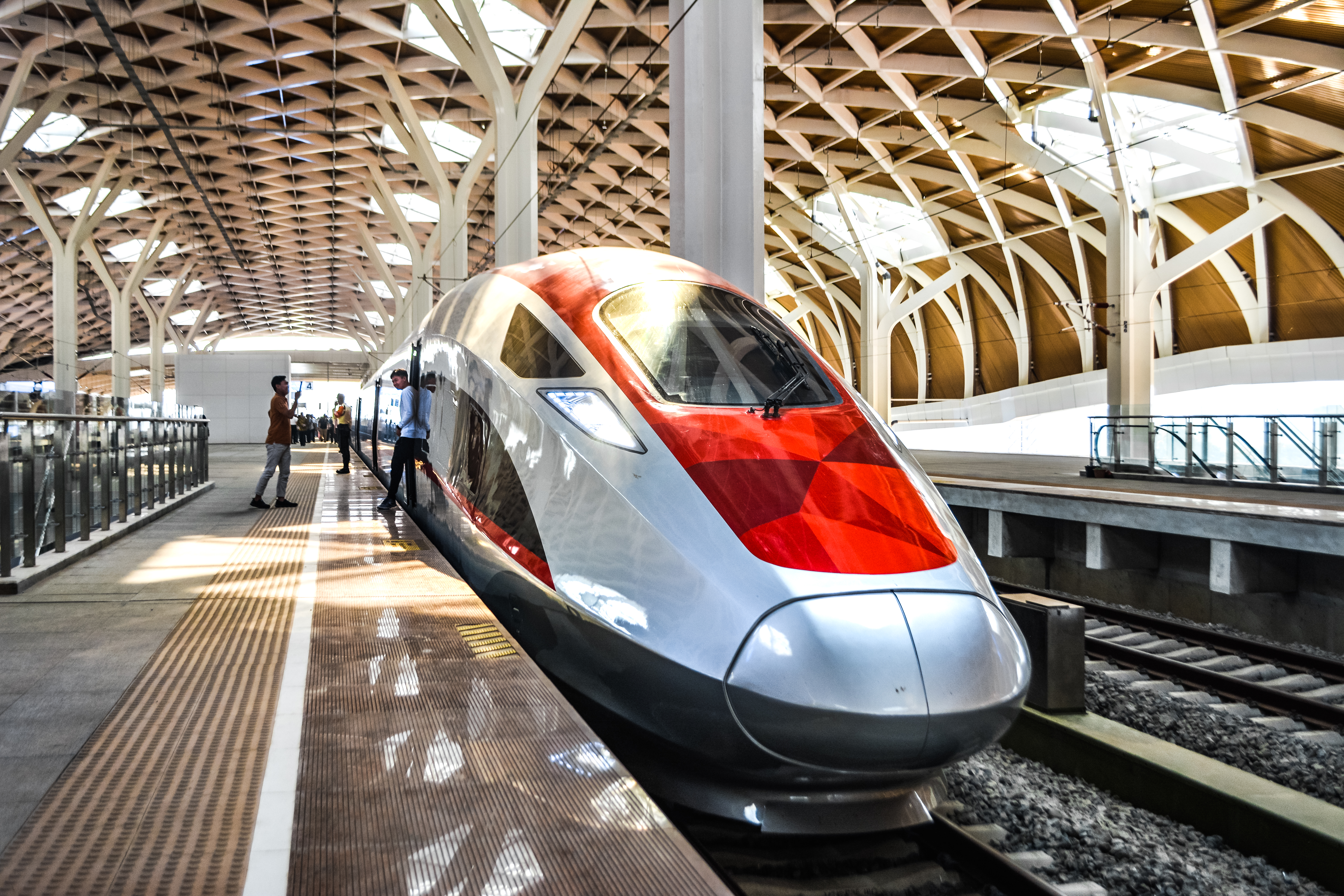
A train HSR KCIC400AF stopped at Halim station connecting Jakarta and Bandung

The Whoosh (short for Waktu Hemat, Operasi Optimal, Sistem Hebat, lit. '"Timesaving, Optimal Operation, Excellent System"') is the brand name for high-speed train services on the Jakarta–Bandung high-speed railway (Indonesian: Kereta Cepat Jakarta–Bandung) operated by Kereta Cepat Indonesia China (KCIC). The Whoosh is the first high-speed railway in the Southern Hemisphere and South East Asia, covering a distance of 142.3 kilometres (88.4 mi) with a top speed of 350 kilometres per hour (220 mph) connecting two of Indonesia's largest cities, Greater Jakarta with over 34 million population and Greater Bandung with population of 9 million, serving a total of 43 million population. (Note: The railway does not enter Bandung City proper) (Note: Laos' Vientiane-Boten railway with speed of 160 kilometres per hour (99 mph) would be classified as semi-high speed rail.) It reduces the travel time between the two cities from 3 hours to about 30 minutes.

== Public transport ==
At present public transport in Greater Jakarta consists of a Jakarta MRT, Jabodebek LRT, Jakarta LRT, KRL Commuterline, Soekarno-Hatta Airport Rail Link, and BRT Transjakarta

| Symbol | Name | Began Operation | Last Extension | Terminus | | Type | Depots | Owner | Operator(s) | No. of Stations | Length (km) | Ridership(s) 2024 |
Rail-based
| KA Commuter Line Jakarta Kota–Tanjung Priok | Tanjung Priok Line | 5 December 2011 (Note: Converted as KCJ line) | 21 December 2015 | Jakarta Kota | Tanjung Priok | Commuter rail (S-train) | Bukit Duri; Depok; Bogor; Manggarai | KAI Commuter | KRL Commuterline | 4 | 15.4 km | 334,361,011 |
| KAI Commuter Cikarang Loop Line | Cikarang Loop Line | 5 December 2011 | 28 May 2022 | Kampung Bandan | Cikarang | Commuter rail (S-train) | Bukit Duri; Depok; Bogor; Manggarai | KAI Commuter | KRL Commuterline | 29 | 87.4 km | 334,361,011 |
| KAI Commuter Bogor Line | Bogor Line | 5 December 2011 | 28 May 2022 | Jakarta Kota | Bogor | Commuter rail (S-train) | Bukit Duri; Depok; Bogor; Manggarai | KAI Commuter | KRL Commuterline | 23 | 54.8 km | 334,361,011 |
| KAI Commuter Bogor Line | Bogor Line | 5 December 2011 | 28 May 2022 | Jakarta Kota | Nambo | Commuter rail (S-train) | Bukit Duri; Depok; Bogor; Manggarai | KAI Commuter | KRL Commuterline | 22 | 51.0 km | 334,361,011 |
| KA Commuter Line Tanah Abang–Rangkasbitung | Rangkasbitung Line | 5 December 2011 | 1 April 2017 | Tanah Abang | Rangkasbitung | Commuter rail (S-train) | Bukit Duri; Depok; Bogor; Manggarai | KAI Commuter | KRL Commuterline | 17 | 72.8 km | 334,361,011 |
| KA Commuter Line Duri–Tangerang | Tangerang Line | 5 December 2011 | | Duri | Tangerang | Commuter rail (S-train) | Bukit Duri; Depok; Bogor; Manggarai | KAI Commuter | KRL Commuterline | 11 | 19.3 km | 334,361,011 |
| Soekarno–Hatta Airport Rail Link | Soekarno-Hatta Line | 31 December 2017 | 8 September 2019 | Manggarai | Soekarno-Hatta | Airport rail link | Manggarai | KAI | KAI Commuter | 5 | 54.3 km | 2,380,704 |
| MRT Line 1 (Jakarta Mass Rapid Transit) | North-South Line | 24 March 2019 | | Lebak Bulus | Bundaran HI Bank Jakarta | Rapid transit | Lebak Bulus | MRT Jakarta | | 13 | 15.7 km | 39,910,100 |
| LRT Line S (Jakarta LRT) | Southern Line | 1 December 2019 | 16 September 2026 | Kelapa Gading | Manggarai | Light metro | Kelapa Gading | LRT Jakarta | | 11 | 12.2 km | 1,213,461 |
| LRT Line 1 (Greater Jakarta LRT) | Cibubur Line | 28 August 2023 | | Dukuh Atas BNI | Harjamukti | Light metro | Jati Mulya | KAI | LRT Jabodebek | 12 | 25.9 km | 21,055,870 |
| LRT Line 3 (Greater Jakarta LRT) | Bekasi Line | 28 August 2023 | | Dukuh Atas BNI | Jati Mulya | Light metro | Jati Mulya | KAI | LRT Jabodebek | 14 | 29.5 km | 21,055,870 |
Bus rapid transit trunk lines
| List of Transjakarta corridors#Corridor 1 | Corridor 1 | 1 February 2004 | 22 July 2022 | Blok M | Kota | Bus rapid transit | Cipayung; Ciputat; Cakung; Cawang; Pulo Gadung; Cijantung; Cibubur; Klender; Kelapa Gading; Klender; Jembatan Gantung; Rawa Buaya; Pinang Ranti; Kampung Rambutan; Pesing; Pamulang; Petukangan Selatan; Cipayung | Transjakarta | | 22 | 15.48 km | 383,198,279 |
| List of Transjakarta corridors#Corridor 2 | Corridor 2 | 15 January 2006 | 4 March 2023 | Pulo Gadung | Monumen Nasional | Bus rapid transit | Cipayung; Ciputat; Cakung; Cawang; Pulo Gadung; Cijantung; Cibubur; Klender; Kelapa Gading; Klender; Jembatan Gantung; Rawa Buaya; Pinang Ranti; Kampung Rambutan; Pesing; Pamulang; Petukangan Selatan; Cipayung | Transjakarta | | 24 | 17.88 km | 383,198,279 |
| List of Transjakarta corridors#Corridor 3 | Corridor 3 | 15 January 2006 | 4 March 2023 | Kalideres | Monumen Nasional | Bus rapid transit | Cipayung; Ciputat; Cakung; Cawang; Pulo Gadung; Cijantung; Cibubur; Klender; Kelapa Gading; Klender; Jembatan Gantung; Rawa Buaya; Pinang Ranti; Kampung Rambutan; Pesing; Pamulang; Petukangan Selatan; Cipayung | Transjakarta | | 14 | 16.14 km | 383,198,279 |
| List of Transjakarta corridors#Corridor 4 | Corridor 4 | 27 January 2007 | | Pulo Gadung | Galunggung | Bus rapid transit | Cipayung; Ciputat; Cakung; Cawang; Pulo Gadung; Cijantung; Cibubur; Klender; Kelapa Gading; Klender; Jembatan Gantung; Rawa Buaya; Pinang Ranti; Kampung Rambutan; Pesing; Pamulang; Petukangan Selatan; Cipayung | Transjakarta | | 17 | 11.90 km | 383,198,279 |
| List of Transjakarta corridors#Corridor 5 | Corridor 5 | 27 January 2007 | | Ancol | Kampung Melayu | Bus rapid transit | Cipayung; Ciputat; Cakung; Cawang; Pulo Gadung; Cijantung; Cibubur; Klender; Kelapa Gading; Klender; Jembatan Gantung; Rawa Buaya; Pinang Ranti; Kampung Rambutan; Pesing; Pamulang; Petukangan Selatan; Cipayung | Transjakarta | | 18 | 13.58 km | 383,198,279 |
| List of TransJakarta corridors#Corridor 6 | Corridor 6 | 27 January 2007 | ca. 2009 | Ragunan | Galunggung | Bus rapid transit | Cipayung; Ciputat; Cakung; Cawang; Pulo Gadung; Cijantung; Cibubur; Klender; Kelapa Gading; Klender; Jembatan Gantung; Rawa Buaya; Pinang Ranti; Kampung Rambutan; Pesing; Pamulang; Petukangan Selatan; Cipayung | Transjakarta | | 20 | 15.90 km | 383,198,279 |
| List of TransJakarta corridors#Corridor 7 | Corridor 7 | 27 January 2007 | | Kampung Rambutan | Kampung Melayu | Bus rapid transit | Cipayung; Ciputat; Cakung; Cawang; Pulo Gadung; Cijantung; Cibubur; Klender; Kelapa Gading; Klender; Jembatan Gantung; Rawa Buaya; Pinang Ranti; Kampung Rambutan; Pesing; Pamulang; Petukangan Selatan; Cipayung | Transjakarta | | 14 | 12.57 km | 383,198,279 |
| List of TransJakarta corridors#Corridor 8 | Corridor 8 | 21 February 2009 | 4 March 2023 | Lebak Bulus | Pasar Baru | Bus rapid transit | Cipayung; Ciputat; Cakung; Cawang; Pulo Gadung; Cijantung; Cibubur; Klender; Kelapa Gading; Klender; Jembatan Gantung; Rawa Buaya; Pinang Ranti; Kampung Rambutan; Pesing; Pamulang; Petukangan Selatan; Cipayung | Transjakarta | | 26 | 25.33 km | 383,198,279 |
| List of TransJakarta corridors#Corridor 9 | Corridor 9 | 31 December 2010 | | Pinang Ranti | Pluit | Bus rapid transit | Cipayung; Ciputat; Cakung; Cawang; Pulo Gadung; Cijantung; Cibubur; Klender; Kelapa Gading; Klender; Jembatan Gantung; Rawa Buaya; Pinang Ranti; Kampung Rambutan; Pesing; Pamulang; Petukangan Selatan; Cipayung | Transjakarta | | 26 | 31.57 km | 383,198,279 |
| List of TransJakarta corridors#Corridor 10 | Corridor 10 | 31 December 2010 | | Tanjung Priok | PGC | Bus rapid transit | Cipayung; Ciputat; Cakung; Cawang; Pulo Gadung; Cijantung; Cibubur; Klender; Kelapa Gading; Klender; Jembatan Gantung; Rawa Buaya; Pinang Ranti; Kampung Rambutan; Pesing; Pamulang; Petukangan Selatan; Cipayung | Transjakarta | | 22 | 19.11 km | 383,198,279 |
| List of TransJakarta corridors#Corridor 11 | Corridor 11 | 28 December 2011 | 28 December 2016 | Pulo Gebang | Kampung Melayu | Bus rapid transit | Cipayung; Ciputat; Cakung; Cawang; Pulo Gadung; Cijantung; Cibubur; Klender; Kelapa Gading; Klender; Jembatan Gantung; Rawa Buaya; Pinang Ranti; Kampung Rambutan; Pesing; Pamulang; Petukangan Selatan; Cipayung | Transjakarta | | 16 | 13.86 km | 383,198,279 |
| List of TransJakarta corridors#Corridor 12 | Corridor 12 | 14 February 2013 | 18 December 2021 | Pluit | Tanjung Priok | Bus rapid transit | Cipayung; Ciputat; Cakung; Cawang; Pulo Gadung; Cijantung; Cibubur; Klender; Kelapa Gading; Klender; Jembatan Gantung; Rawa Buaya; Pinang Ranti; Kampung Rambutan; Pesing; Pamulang; Petukangan Selatan; Cipayung | Transjakarta | | 24 | 23.30 km | 383,198,279 |
| List of TransJakarta corridors#Corridor 13 | Corridor 13 | 13 August 2017 | 12 November 2018 | CBD Ciledug | Tegal Mampang | Bus rapid transit | Cipayung; Ciputat; Cakung; Cawang; Pulo Gadung; Cijantung; Cibubur; Klender; Kelapa Gading; Klender; Jembatan Gantung; Rawa Buaya; Pinang Ranti; Kampung Rambutan; Pesing; Pamulang; Petukangan Selatan; Cipayung | Transjakarta | | 15 | 14.18 km | 383,198,279 |
| List of TransJakarta corridors#Corridor 14 | Corridor 14 | 10 November 2023 (Note: Converted as BRT line) | 23 August 2024 | Jakarta International Stadium | Senen Raya | Bus rapid transit | Cipayung; Ciputat; Cakung; Cawang; Pulo Gadung; Cijantung; Cibubur; Klender; Kelapa Gading; Klender; Jembatan Gantung; Rawa Buaya; Pinang Ranti; Kampung Rambutan; Pesing; Pamulang; Petukangan Selatan; Cipayung | Transjakarta | | 10 | 9.7 km | 383,198,279 |
| Total | | | | | | | | | | 424 | 672.4 km | 788,175,314 |
Planned/under construction lines
| KAI Commuter Bogor Line | Bogor Line extension | TBA | | Bogor | Sukabumi | Commuter rail (S-train) | Bukit Duri; Depok; Bogor; Manggarai | KAI Commuter | KRL Commuterline | 11 | 57.3 Km | |
| | JIS Line | TBA | | Jatinegara | Tanjung Priok | Commuter rail (S-train) | Bukit Duri; Depok; Bogor; Manggarai | KAI Commuter | KRL Commuterline | 9 | TBA | |
| KA Commuter Line Tanah Abang–Rangkasbitung | Rangkasbitung Line extension | TBA | | Rangkasbitung | Merak | Commuter rail (S-train) | Bukit Duri; Depok; Bogor; Manggarai | KAI Commuter | KRL Commuterline | 11 | 68.5 Km | |
| KAI Commuter Cikarang Loop Line | Cikarang Loop Line extension | TBA | | Cikarang | Cikampek | Commuter rail (S-train) | Bukit Duri; Depok; Bogor; Manggarai | KAI Commuter | KRL Commuterline | 8 | 41.0 Km | |
| MRT Line 1 (Jakarta Mass Rapid Transit) | North-South Line extension | Under construction | | Bundaran HI Bank Jakarta | Kota | Rapid transit | Lebak Bulus | MRT Jakarta | | 7 | 5.8 km | |
| MRT Line 1 (Jakarta Mass Rapid Transit) | North-South Line extension | TBA | | Kota | Ancol Marina | Rapid transit | Ancol Marina | MRT Jakarta | | 3 | 5.2 km | |
| MRT Line 1 (Jakarta Mass Rapid Transit) | North-South Line extension | TBA | | Lebak Bulus | Parung | Rapid transit | Lebak Bulus | MRT Jakarta | | TBA | 18.0 km | |
| Jakarta MRT | East-West Line | Under Construction | | Tomang | Medan Satria | Rapid transit | Rorotan Balaraja | MRT Jakarta | | 21 | 24.5 km | |
| Jakarta MRT | East-West Line | TBA | | Tomang | Kembangan | Rapid transit | Rorotan Balaraja | MRT Jakarta | | 6 | 9.2 km | |
| Jakarta MRT | East-West Line | TBA | | Kembangan | Balaraja | Rapid transit | Rorotan Balaraja | MRT Jakarta | | 14 | 29.9 km | |
| Jakarta MRT | East-West Line | TBA | | Medan Satria | Cikarang | Rapid transit | Rorotan Balaraja | MRT Jakarta | | 8 | 20.5 km | |
| Jakarta MRT | Outer Ring Line | TBA | | Kampung Rambutan | Fatmawati | Rapid transit | Kampung Rambutan | MRT Jakarta | | 10 | 12.0 km | |
| Jakarta MRT | Outer Ring Line | TBA | | Fatmawati | Joglo | Rapid transit | Kampung Rambutan | MRT Jakarta | | TBA | 10.0 km | |
| Jakarta MRT | Outer Ring Line | TBA | | Joglo | PIK | Rapid transit | Kampung Rambutan | MRT Jakarta | | TBA | 12.0 km | |
| Jakarta MRT | Outer Ring Line | TBA | | PIK | Ancol | Rapid transit | Kampung Rambutan | MRT Jakarta | | TBA | 12.0 km | |
| Jakarta MRT | Outer Ring Line | TBA | | Ancol | Semper Barat | Rapid transit | Kampung Rambutan | MRT Jakarta | | TBA | 12.0 km | |
| Jakarta MRT | Outer Ring Line | TBA | | Semper Barat | Cakung | Rapid transit | Kampung Rambutan | MRT Jakarta | | TBA | 11.0 km | |
| Jakarta MRT | Outer Ring Line | TBA | | Cakung | Kampung Rambutan | Rapid transit | Kampung Rambutan | MRT Jakarta | | TBA | 17.0 km | |
| LRT Line S (Jakarta LRT) | Southern Line extension | TBA | | Manggarai | Dukuh Atas | Light metro | Pegangsaan Dua | LRT Jakarta | | 1 | 2.4 km | |
| LRT Line S (Jakarta LRT) | Southern Line extension | TBA | | Dukuh Atas | Pesing | Light metro | Pegangsaan Dua | LRT Jakarta | | 13 | 12.3 km | |
| LRT Line S (Jakarta LRT) | Southern Line extension | TBA | | Velodrome | Klender | Light metro | Pegangsaan Dua | LRT Jakarta | | 5 | 4.5 km | |
| LRT Line S (Jakarta LRT) | Southern Line extension | TBA | | Klender | Halim | Light metro | Pegangsaan Dua | LRT Jakarta | | 4 | 4.9 km | |
| LRT Northern Line (Jakarta LRT) | Northern Line | TBA | | Rajawali | Pesing | Light metro | Pegangsaan Dua | LRT Jakarta | | 6 | 8.9 km | |
| LRT Northern Line (Jakarta LRT) | Northern Line | TBA | | Kelapa Gading | JIS | Light metro | Pegangsaan Dua | LRT Jakarta | | 6 | 8.9 km | |
| LRT Northern Line (Jakarta LRT) | Northern Line | TBA | | JIS | Rajawali | Light metro | Pegangsaan Dua | LRT Jakarta | | 4 | 5.6 km | |
| LRT Line 1 (Greater Jakarta LRT) | Cibubur Line extension | TBA | | Harjamukti | Baranangsiang | Light metro | Jati Mulya | KAI | LRT Jabodebek | 4 | 6.0 km | |
| LRT Line 1 (Greater Jakarta LRT) | Cibubur Line extension | TBA | | Senayan | Dukuh Atas BNI | Light metro | Jati Mulya | KAI | LRT Jabodebek | 5 | 40.0 km | |
| LRT Line 3 (Greater Jakarta LRT) | Bekasi Line extension | TBA | | Dukuh Atas BNI | Soekarno-Hatta | Light metro | Jati Mulya | KAI | LRT Jabodebek | 9 | 45.2 km | |
| | PLGP LRT Line | TBA | | Pulo Gebang | Joglo | Light metro | Pulo Gebang | TBA | | TBA | TBA | |

=== Jakarta BRT ===
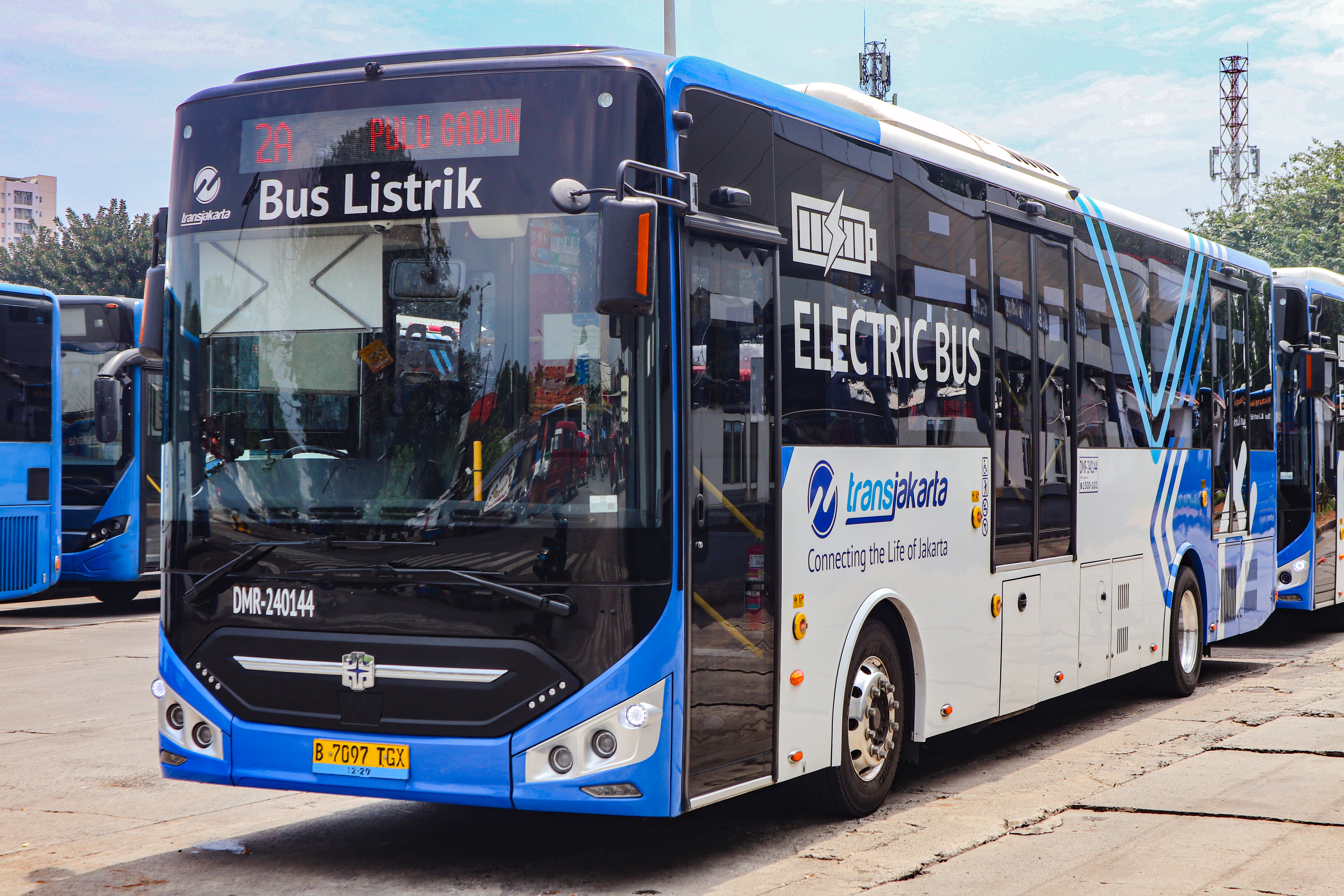
Transjakarta buses use separate lanes to avoid congested roads, and it has the world's longest bus rapid transit routes.

Transjakarta bus rapid transit service (known as Busway) was developed in the context of development reforms (or reformasi) and used Bogota's TransMilenio system as a model. Jakarta's first busway line, from Blok M to Jakarta Kota opened in January 2004 and as of 11 November 2023, fourteen out of nineteen corridors are in use. Transjakarta has the world's longest bus rapid transit routes (230.9 kilometers (143.5 mi) in length). Transjakarta had a total of 128 routes as of April 2018 (corridor, cross route & feeder route) - a significant increase from 41 routes in 2015. TransJakarta has targeted to serve one million passengers per day by the end of 2018. In addition there are 14 feeder routes that serve beyond the exclusive busway corridors. Located in the municipalities surrounding Jakarta, the feeder service uses special buses that allow for boarding at either ground level or the Transjakarta station platforms. Transjakarta owned more than 1,500 buses in the first three months of 2017 and targets to have 3,000 buses by the end of the year.

=== KRL Commuterline ===
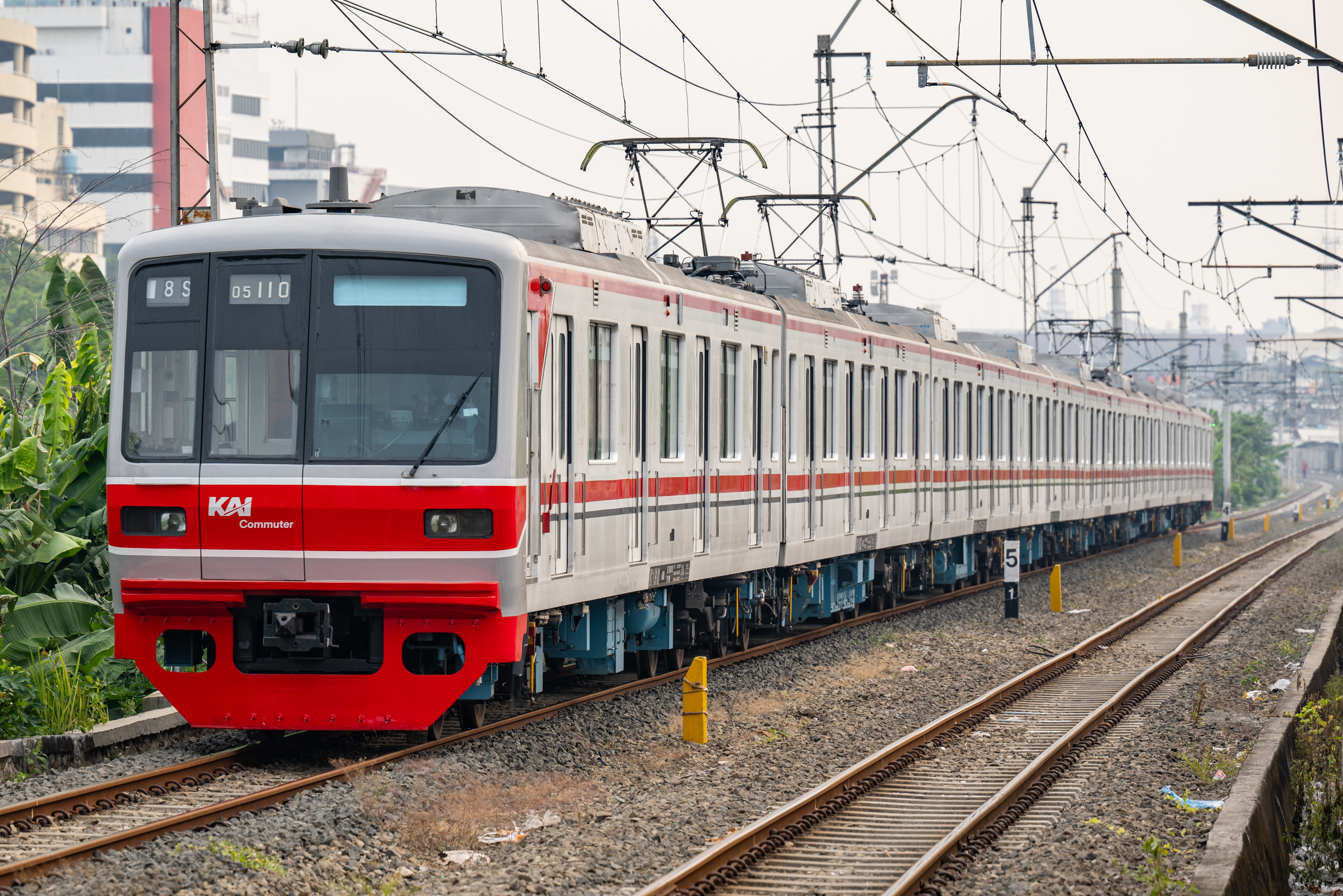
A KRL Commuterline arriving in Kampung Bandan station

Greater Jakarta Commuter Rail or commonly known as KRL Commuterline is a commuter rail system which serves commuters in Jakarta, Bogor, Depok, Tangerang, South Tangerang, and Bekasi. The commuter system was started in 2000. The number of passengers in 2014 reached 208 million, rising from 158 million in the previous year. Commuter Line serves all municipalities in Jakarta excluding the Thousand Islands, as well as Greater Jakarta region. The rail system uses rolling stock of rapid transit standard and operates at high frequency with a minimum headway. The average daily ridership was about 0.95 million with a total of 315.8 million commuters used Commuter LineL Jabodetabek in the year 2017.

Major rail stations on the commuter line are Jakarta Kota, Jatinegara, Tanah Abang, Duri, Pasar Senen, Manggarai and Sudirman. As a transit station, Manggarai railway station is the busiest station in Indonesia, with more than 100,000 passengers boarding and alighting each day. Though during rush hours, the number of passengers greatly exceeds the system's capacity, and crowding is common.

=== Jakarta MRT ===
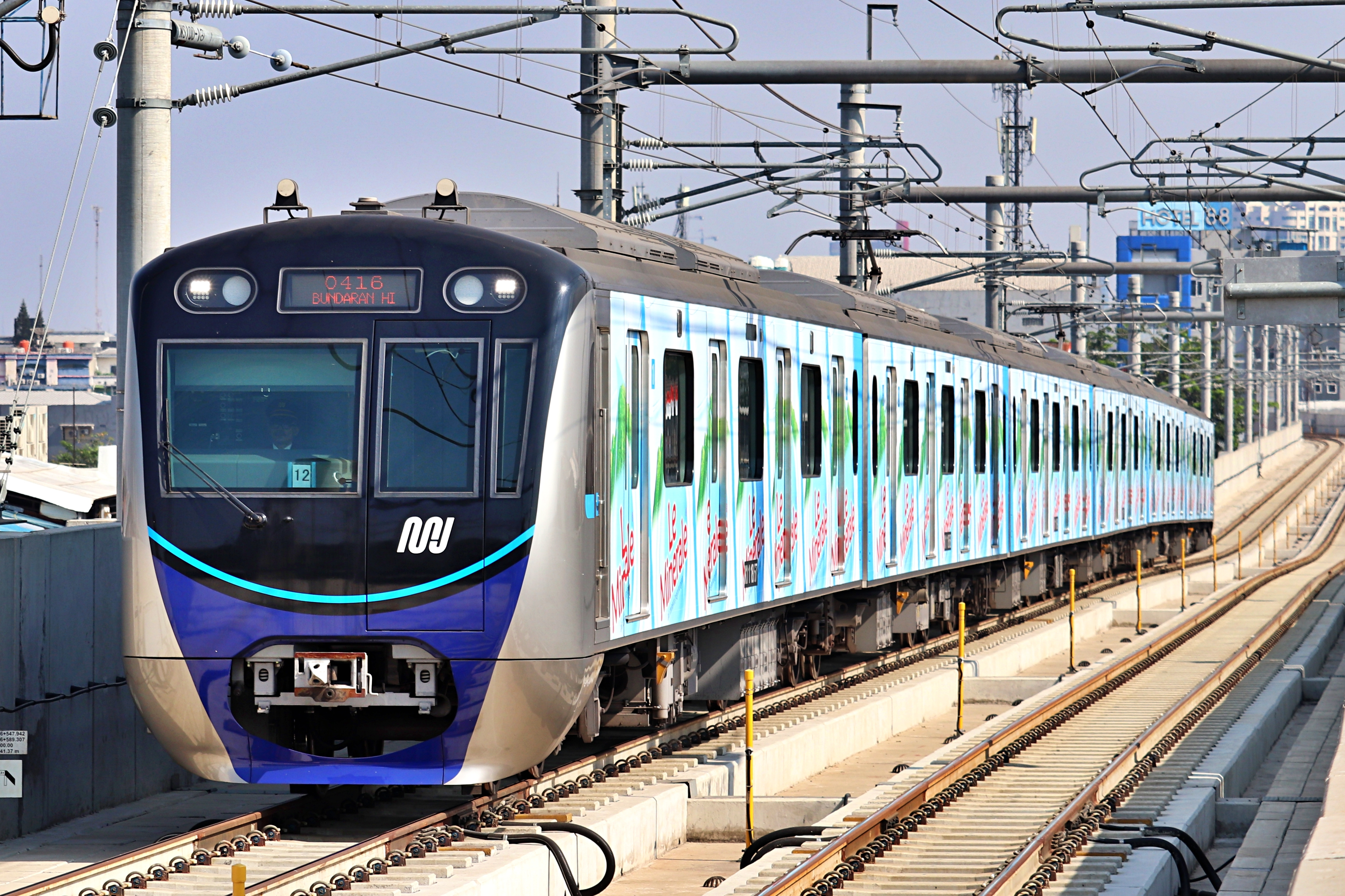
Jakarta MRT train leaving Haji Nawi station.

After a long planning and years of delay, Jakarta Mass Rapid Transit is currently in service. Jakarta city government decided for a rail-based system because of its ability to carry large numbers of people quickly and cheaply. Jakarta MRT has a North–South line between Kota and Lebak Bulus and an East–West line. Preparation work started in April 2012, and groundbreaking was done in October 2013. The first phase, between Bundaran HI Bank Jakarta and Lebak Bulus began operations on 24 March 2019, and the entire North–South line is scheduled to be operational by 2027, with segment from Bundaran HI to Kota currently under construction.

=== Jakarta LRT ===
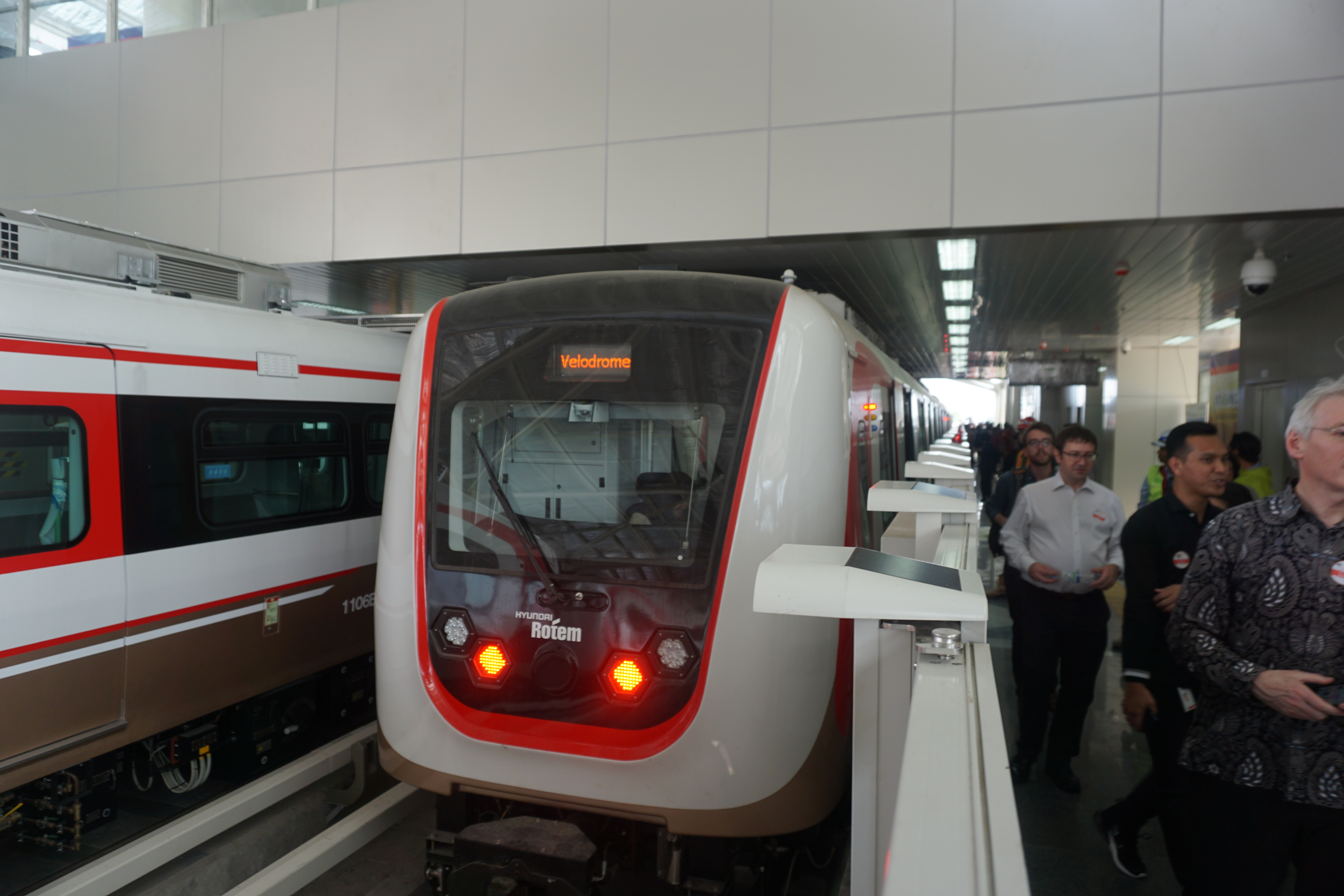
Jakarta LRT at Boulevard Utara station.

Jakarta LRT is a light rapid transit system. Eight two-cars trainsets were procured. The first phase of the LRT, from Velodrome to Pegangsaan Dua with six stations and a length of 5.8 kilometers (3.6 mi), began commercial operations on 1 December 2019. Currently, phase 1B, which spans from Velodrome to Manggarai, is under construction and expected to open in 2026.

=== Jabodebek LRT ===
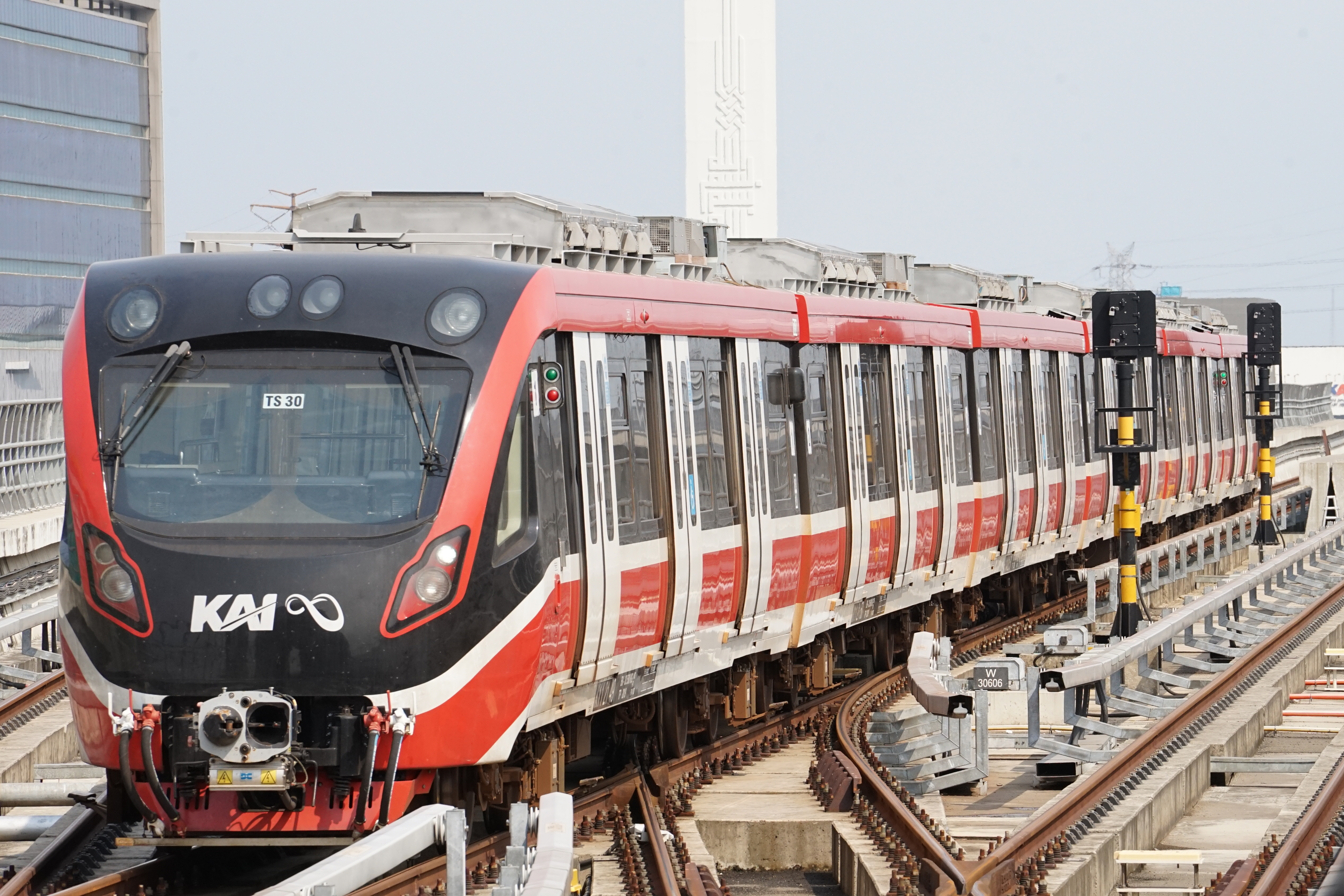
Jabodebek LRT arriving to Jatimulya station.

Jabodebek LRT (LRT Jabodebek), formerly known as Greater Jakarta LRT is a light metro system. The light rail transit (LRT) project was launched to replace the previously abandoned monorail project. The groundbreaking ceremony was held on 9 September 2015, with the first phase of the construction will connect Harjamukti in Depok with Dukuh Atas BNI in downtown Central Jakarta, passing through Cawang intersection. This phase is 42.1 kilometers (26.2 miles) long, includes 18 stations, began commercial operation on August 28, 2023 after multiple delays.

=== Airport rail link ===
Soekarno-Hatta Airport Rail Link is a commuter train service connecting the Soekarno-Hatta International Airport to Manggarai in Central Jakarta.

=== Jak Lingko ===
Jak Lingko (formerly OK OTrip) is a public transport integration program designed to integrate payment between transport modes in Jakarta. The integration includes BRT, Commuter rail, Light Metro, MRT, LRT, Airport rail link and local angkot (Mikrotrans). The payment card caps fares at IDR 5,000 for up to 3 hours on transfers for smaller participating local bus services to or from the TransJakarta BRT network, and aims to reduce transportation costs by 30 percent.

== Air ==
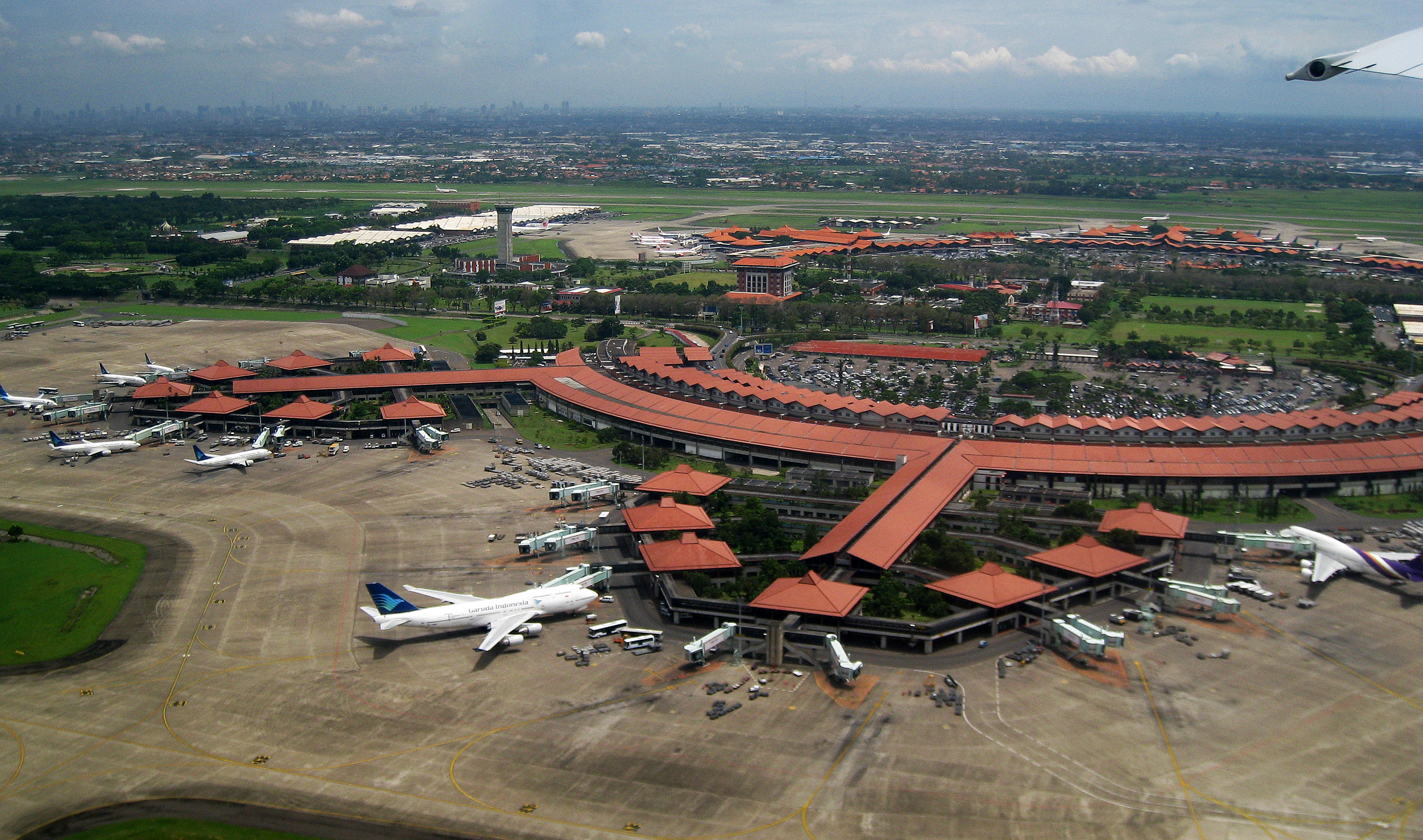
Soekarno–Hatta International Airport Aerial view

Soekarno–Hatta International Airport (CGK) is the main airport serving the Greater Jakarta area. The airport is named after the first President of Indonesia, Soekarno, and the first Vice President of Indonesia, Mohammad Hatta. The airport is often called Cengkareng airport or Soetta by Indonesians. The airport's IATA code, CGK, originates from the name of the Cengkareng locality, Tangerang, Banten, although the location of this airport is located outside of the city, it is used as a gate out by the Jakartans and citizen of the surrounding areas, therefore at the main gate of the airport, there is an inscription "Jakarta Airports". Soekarno–Hatta International Airport was ranked as 17th busiest airport in the world by Airports Council International, with about 63 million passengers in 2017. Today the airport is running over capacity. After T3 Soekarno-Hatta Airport expansion has finished in May 2016, the total capacity of three terminals become 43 million passengers a year. T1 and T2 also will be revitalized, so all the three terminals finally will accommodate 67 million passengers a year.

A second airport, Halim Perdanakusuma Airport (HLP) serves domestic flight of low-cost airline, private and VIP/presidential flights. Other airports in the Jakarta metropolitan area include Pondok Cabe Airport and an airfield on Pulau Panjang, part of the Thousand Island archipelago (Kepulauan Seribu).

== Waterway ==
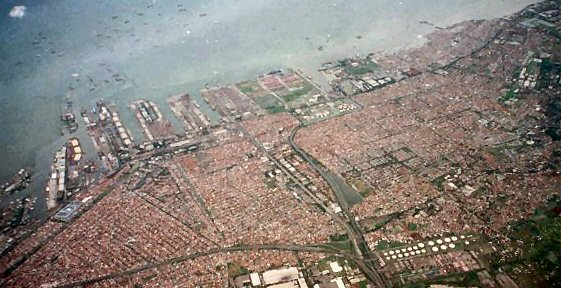
Port of Tanjung Priok, the busiest port in Indonesia.

=== Sea ===
Jakarta's main seaport Port of Tanjung Priok serves many ferry connections to different parts of Indonesia. Port of Tanjung Priok is Indonesia's busiest port, and the 21st busiest port in the world in 2013, handling over 6.59 million TEUs. To boost the port capacity, two-phase "New Tanjung Priok" extension project is currently ongoing. When fully operational in 2023, it will triple existing annual capacity.

The port is also an important employer in the area, with more than 18,000 employees who provide services to more than 18,000 ships every year. The Port of Tanjung Priok has 20 terminals: general cargo, multipurpose terminal, scraps terminal, passenger terminal, dry bulk terminal, liquid bulk terminal, oil terminal, chemicals terminal and three container terminals, 76 berths, a quay length of 16,853 meters (55,292 feet), a total storage area of 661,822 square meters (7,123,790 square feet) and a storage capacity of 401,468 metric tons.

Muara Angke Port is used as a public port to Thousand Islands. In December 2011, Muara Angke Port was renovated for Rp 130 billion ($14.4 million) in a 3 hectare area. The port serves three water transport routes as of 2020:

| Route | Stops |
|---|---|
| Route 1 | Muara Angke – Untung Jawa Island – Lancang Island – Payung Island – Tidung Island |
| Route 2 | Muara Angke – Untung Jawa Island – Pari Island – Panggang Island – Pramuka Island |
| Route 3 | Muara Angke – Kelapa Island – Sabira Island |

Another ports in Jakarta include the old port of Sunda Kelapa and Marina Ancol Port. Sunda Kelapa Port only accommodate pinisi, a traditional two masted wooden sailing ship serving inter-island freight service in the archipelago. Marina Ancol Port is used as a tourist port, serves speed boat routes to various islands across Thousand Islands.

=== River ===
On 6 June 2007, the city administration introduced the Waterway (officially Angkutan Sungai), a new river boat service along the Ciliwung River. Due to varying water levels during the dry and wet seasons in addition to heavy water pollution that comes with water from upstream during rain, the service was closed.

== See also ==
- Greater Jakarta Integrated Mass Transit System
- Transport in Indonesia
- Bali MRT
