= Minitrans =

Indonesian bus service

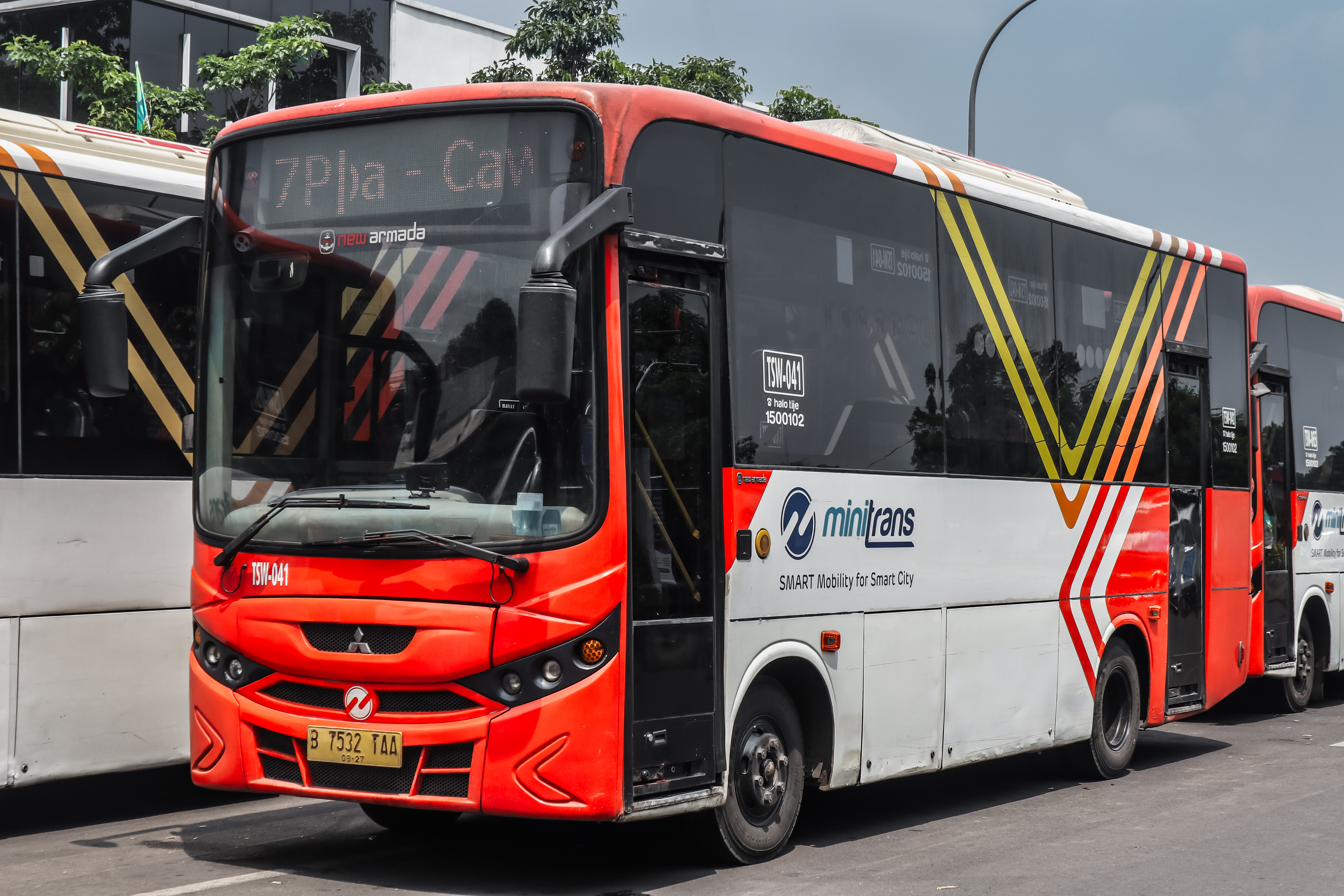

Overview
- Owner: Provincial Government of DKI Jakarta
- Area served: Greater Jakarta
- Locale: Jakarta, Indonesia
- Transit type: City Bus
- Website: https://transjakarta.co.id/layanan/angkutan-pengumpan

Operation
- Began operation: 2017
- Character: At-Grade

Minitrans is a bus service operated by Transjakarta from 2017 along with Metrotrans. Like Metrotrans, they were introduced to replace the ageing MetroMini and Kopaja busses. They often inherit similar routes, which MetroMini and Kopaja busses once served, though using different numbering. Furthermore Minitrans busses are also used to serve cross corridor routes. They along with the more smaller Mikrotrans, serve as both a feeder bus service to the main Transjakarta corridors, as well as an additional form of urban transportation in Jakarta.

The busses bodies are often built by local carrosseries such as New Armada, Laksana, Tri Sakti, or Lie Ling, and use Mitsubishi Fuso, Isuzu or Hino chassis. They are smaller than Metrotrans busses, allowing them to travel through narrower roads.

== Routes and fares ==
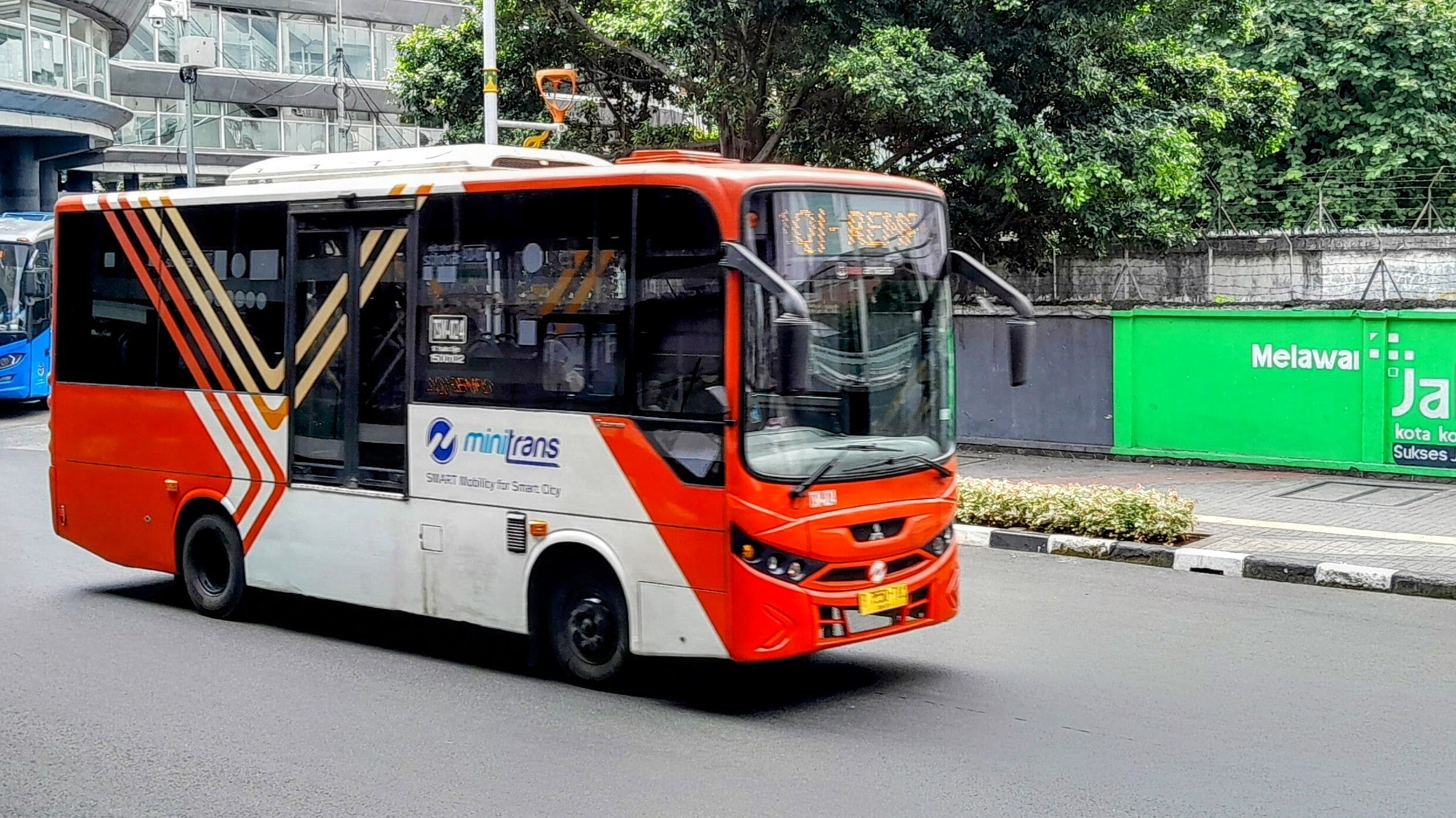
A Minitrans Bus

As of December 2025, there are about 65 routes that are served by both Minitrans and Metrotrans busses. The service covers nearly all of Jakarta, and runs daily from 05:00 - 22:00. Nearly all routes are connected to a Transjakarta or a Mikrotrans corridor, where passengers could transfer. Furthermore they are also connected to Transportation Hubs like CSW-ASEAN, Blok-M Terminal and Dukuh Atas.

The fair of a single trip on Minitrans Bus is Rp. 3,500, it can only be paid electronically using QRIS on your phone or by cards like e-money. While it is an essential feeder service to Transjakarta, one still has to tap out of a Minitrans Bus and then tap in at a Transjakarta bus station, resulting in one having to pay double to transit.

== Facilities ==
Minitrans busses are high-floor medium-busses, that can carry 17 seated passengers and 15 standing passengers. There are also 2 priority seats on board, and space for one wheelchair. Unfortunately due to the high-floor built, it can only drop off wheelchair users at Transjakarta BRT station, which is often the termini of Minitrans routes.

The busses themselves all include AC, and have stop buttons to indicate to the driver that they should stop at the next bus stop. It is however also common that bus drivers stop at every bus stop.

Unlike the high-floor Transjakarta buses, Minitrans and Metrotrans do not have a designated Women's Area at the front, so male passengers are still allowed to sit in the front area.

== Fleet ==
Operator	Brand	Model	Fuel	Coachbuilder	Image
Jewa Dian Mitra	(Japan) Hino Motors	GB 150 A/T	Diesel	Laksana	Minitrans bus operated by Jewa Dian Mitra
Metro Baru Transport	(Japan) Hino Motors	GB 150 A/T	Diesel	Laksana	Minitrans bus operated by Metrobaru Transport
Pusaka Satria Utama	(Japan) Isuzu	NQR 71	Diesel	Laksana	Minitrans bus operated by Pusaka Satria Utama
PT. Bianglala Metropolitan	(Japan) Isuzu	NQR 71	Diesel	Trisakti	Minitrans bus operated by PT. Bianglala Metropolitan
Koantas Bima (Korperasi Angkut Lintas Bis Madya)	(Japan) Isuzu	FB 130 / GB 150 M/T	Diesel	Trisakti	Minitrans bus operated by Koantas Bima using the Koantas bima livery
Sentra Glosia Indonesia	(Japan) Isuzu	Elf NQR-B	Diesel	New Lie Ling	Minitrans bus operated by Sentra Glosia Indonesia
Trans Swadaya	(Japan) Mitsubishi Fuso	FE 84G BC	Diesel	New Armada	Minitrans bus operated by Trans Swadaya

== Gallery ==
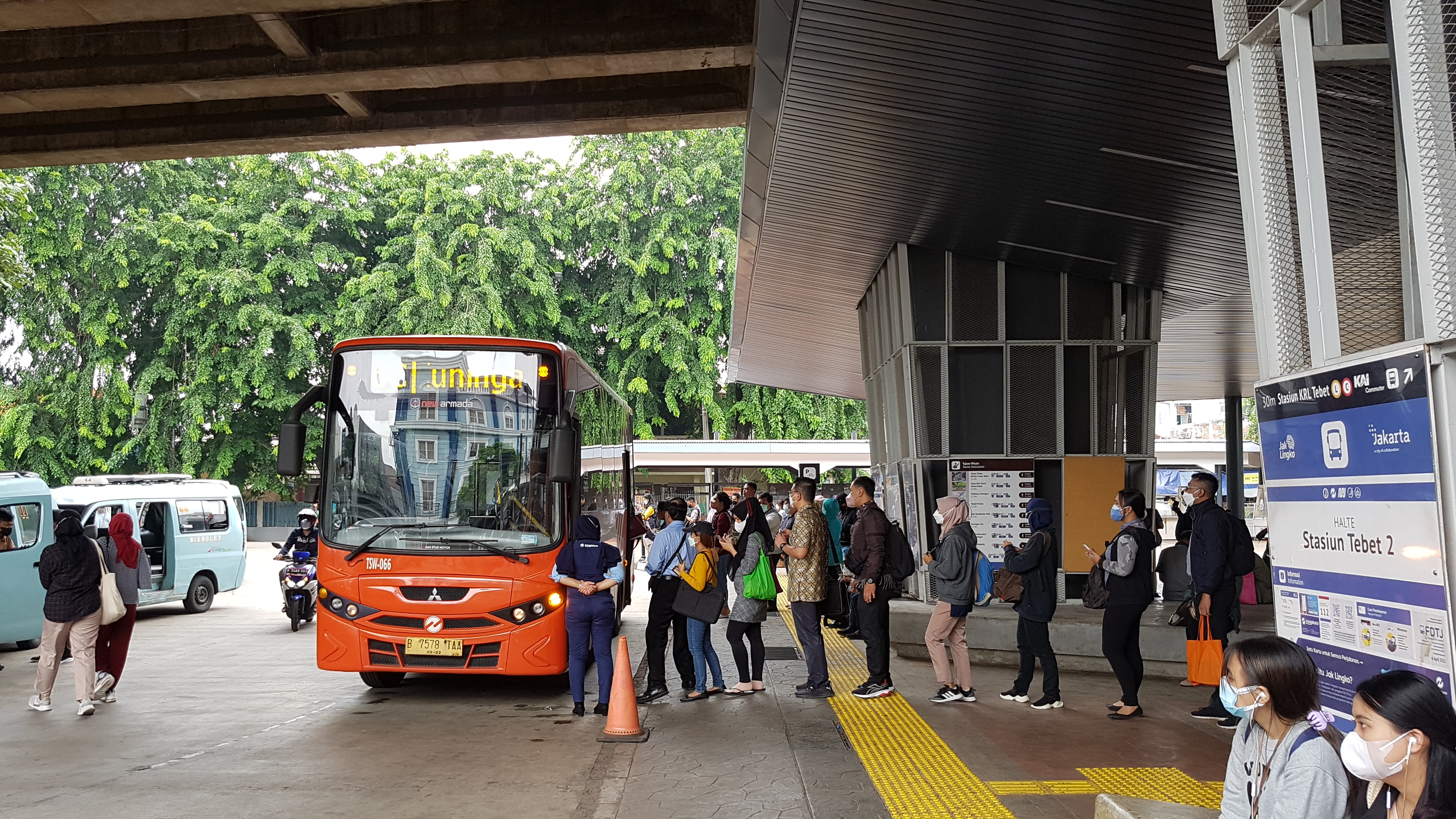
Passengers boarding a Minitrans bus at Tebet Transit Hub, which integrates with the Tebet KRL Commuterline station.

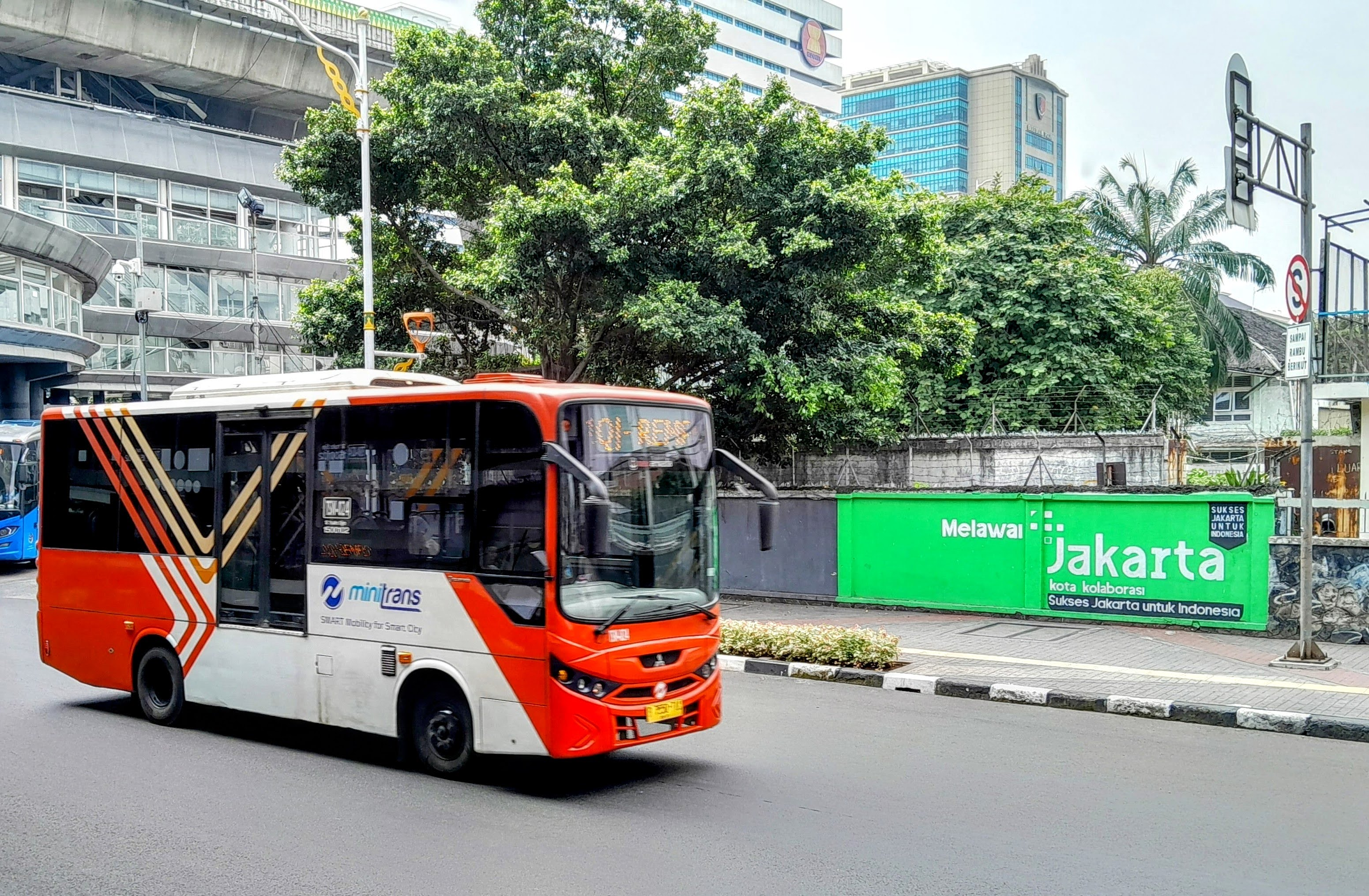
Minitrans bus near Blok-M bus terminal, with the ASEAN headquarters building in the background.

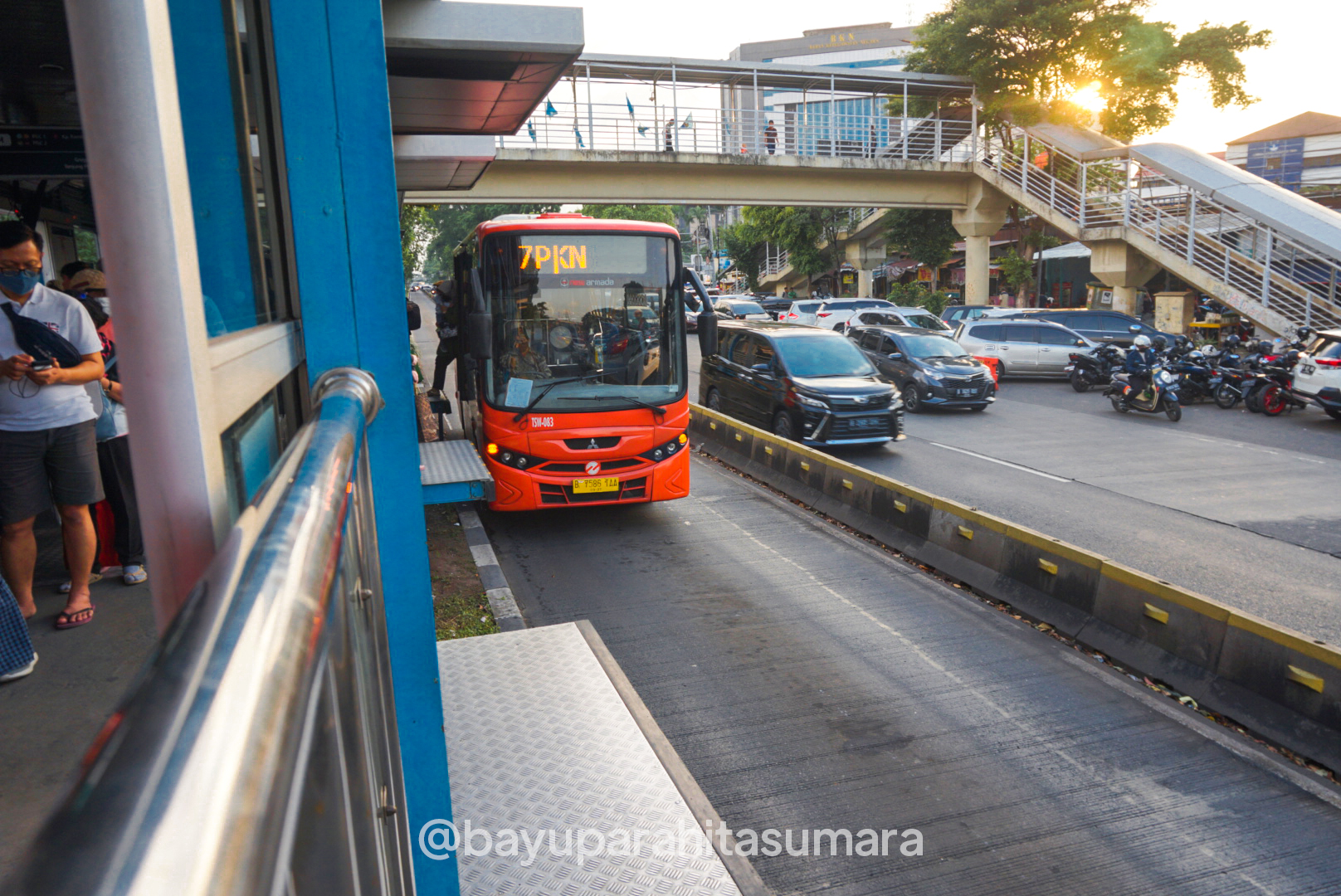
Minitrans bus entering the Cawang Cilitan bus stop.

== See also ==
- Metrotrans
- Mikrotrans
- Royaltrans
- TransJakarta
- Transport in Jakarta
