= Metrotrans =

Bus service in Jakarta, Indonesia

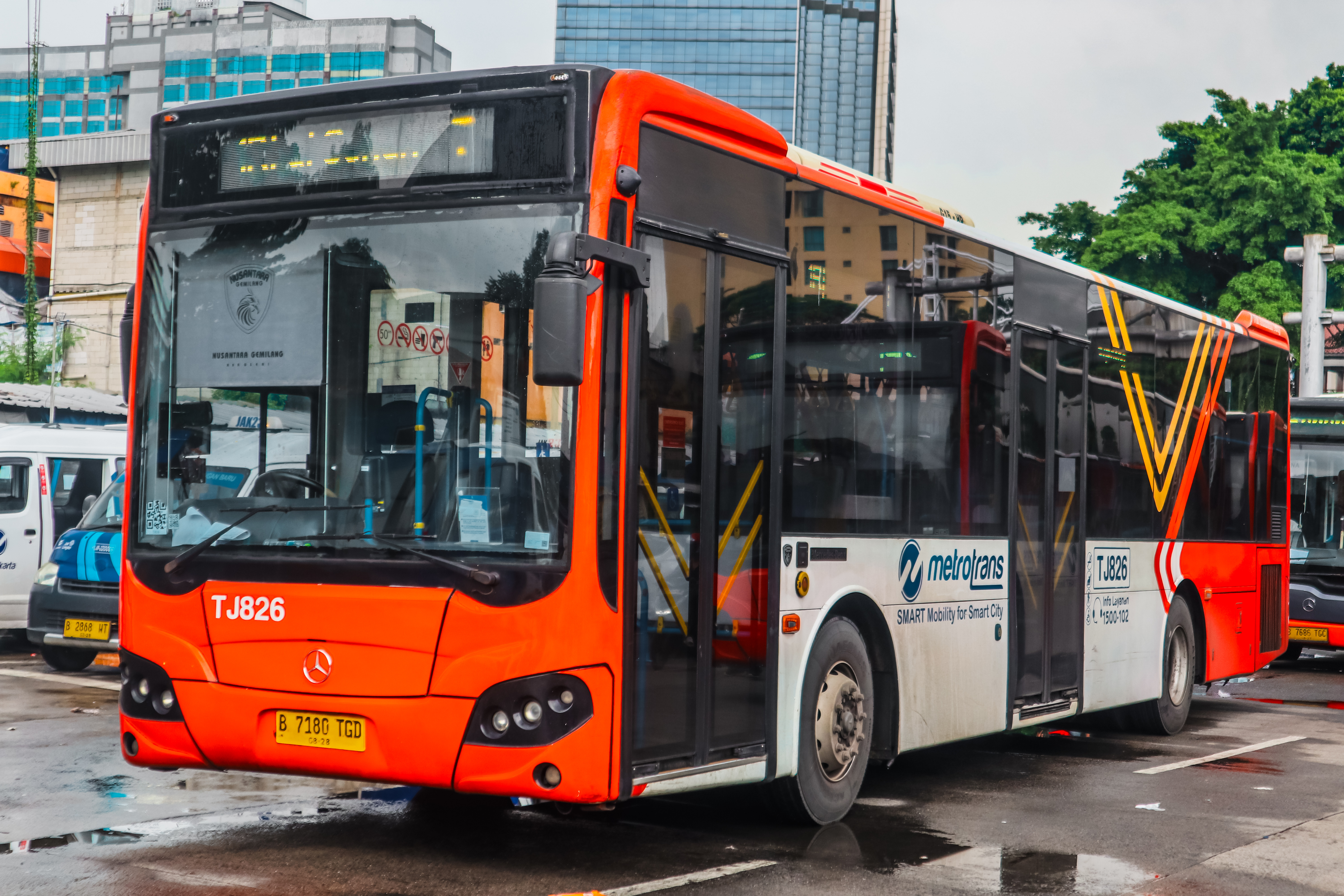

Overview
- Owner: Provincial Government of DKI Jakarta
- Area served: Greater Jakarta
- Locale: Jakarta, Indonesia
- Transit type: City Bus
- Website: https://transjakarta.co.id/layanan/angkutan-pengumpan

Operation
- Began operation: 2017
- Character: At-Grade

Metrotrans is a regular transit bus service operated by TransJakarta introduced in 2017 to replace the aging MetroMini and Kopaja buses. It was introduced to offer a more reliable and comfortable form of bus travel in Jakarta and its surrounding areas. It serves a number of routes, that are often interconnected with other modes of transport in Jakarta like the Transjakarta BRT, MRT, and Commuterline. Unlike Transjakarta buses it doesn't drive on a dedicated bus lane, and has its design based on the European-styled low-floor bus. One reason for the low-floor buses is to make the bus service more accessible for disabled passengers. Since 2022, Metrotrans also operates a fleet of electric powered buses. These electric buses are from Chinese manufacturers such as BYD, Skywell, Golden Dragon, and Zhongtong.

== Routes and fares ==
Metrotrans and minitrans operate about 65 routes. The service covers nearly all of Jakarta, and runs daily from 05:00 - 22:00. Nearly all routes are connected to Mikrotrans microbus corridors, Transjakarta BRT, Jakarta MRT and Greater Jakarta Commuterline. The service is also connected to Transportation Hubs like CSW-ASEAN, Blok-M Terminal and Dukuh Atas.

The fair of a single trip regardless of distance travelled on a Metrotrans Bus is Rp. 3,500. The fare can only be paid electronically using QRIS on your phone or by card, like e-money. Passengers have to tap in when entering the bus and tap out when exiting the bus. While it is an essential feeder service for Transjakarta, one still has to tap out of a Minitrans Bus and then tap in at a Transjakarta bus station. This results in one having to pay double to transit between the services.

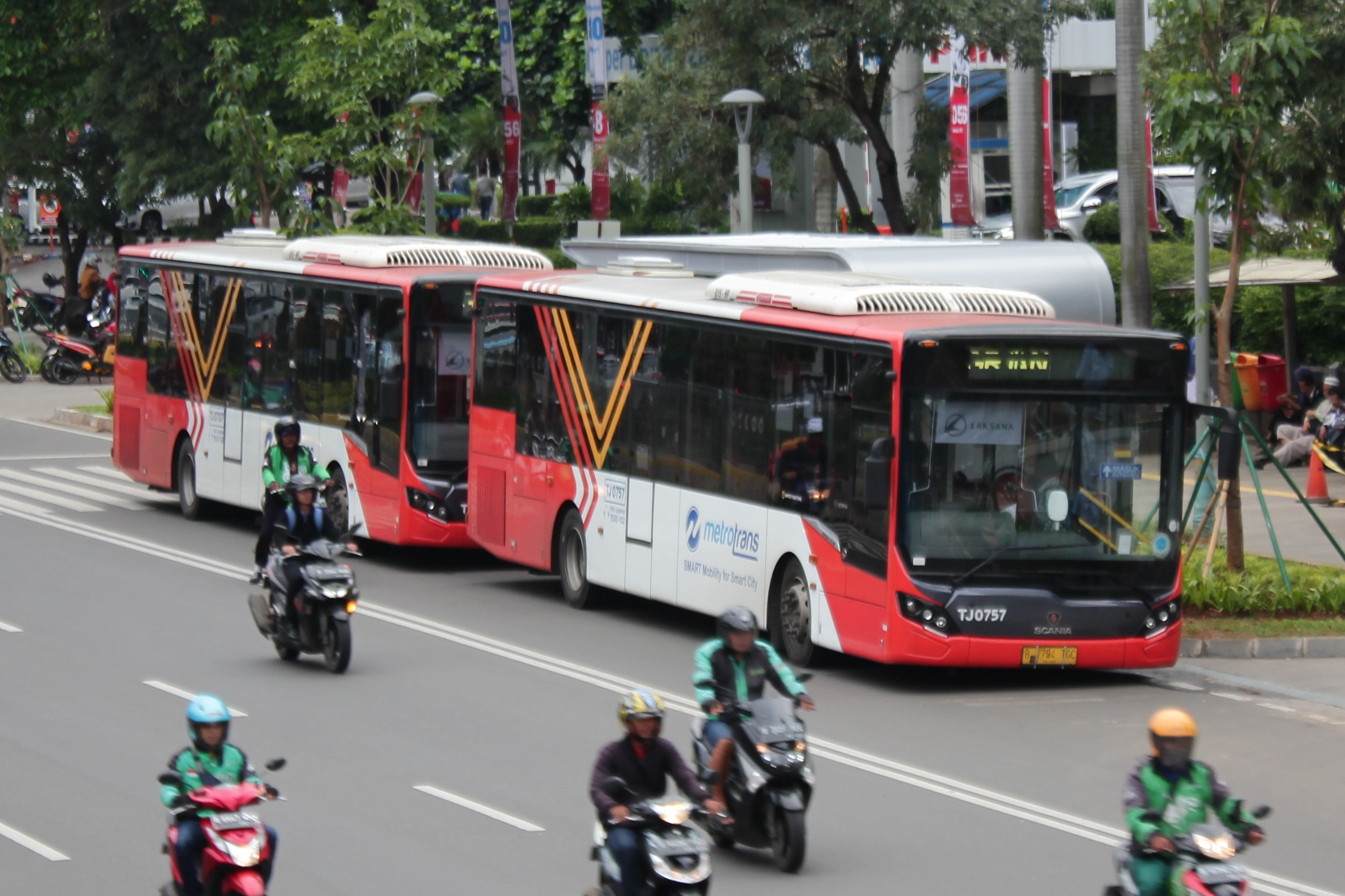
Metrotrans busses at Senayan

== Fleet ==
Operator	Brand	Model	Fuel	Coachbuilder	Image
PT. Transportasi Jakarta (self-managed)	(Sweden) Scania	K250UB 4x2 Euro III	Diesel	Laksana	
PT. Transportasi Jakarta (self-managed)	(Germany) Mercedes Benz	0500U 1726 Euro III	Diesel	Laksana	
PT. Transportasi Jakarta (self-managed)	(Germany) Mercedes Benz	0500U 1726 Euro III	Diesel	Nusantara Gemilang	
Perum Damri	(China) Skywell	NJL6129BEV Low-deck	Electric	Completely built-up from China	
PT. Mayasari Bakti	(China) BYD	B12	Electric	Completely built-up from China	
PT. Bianglala Metropolitan	(China) SAG	XML6125JEVJ0C3 Low-deck	Electric	Completely built-up from China	

== See also ==
- TransJakarta
- Minitrans
- Royaltrans
