= Kopaja =

Former Public transport services in Jakarta

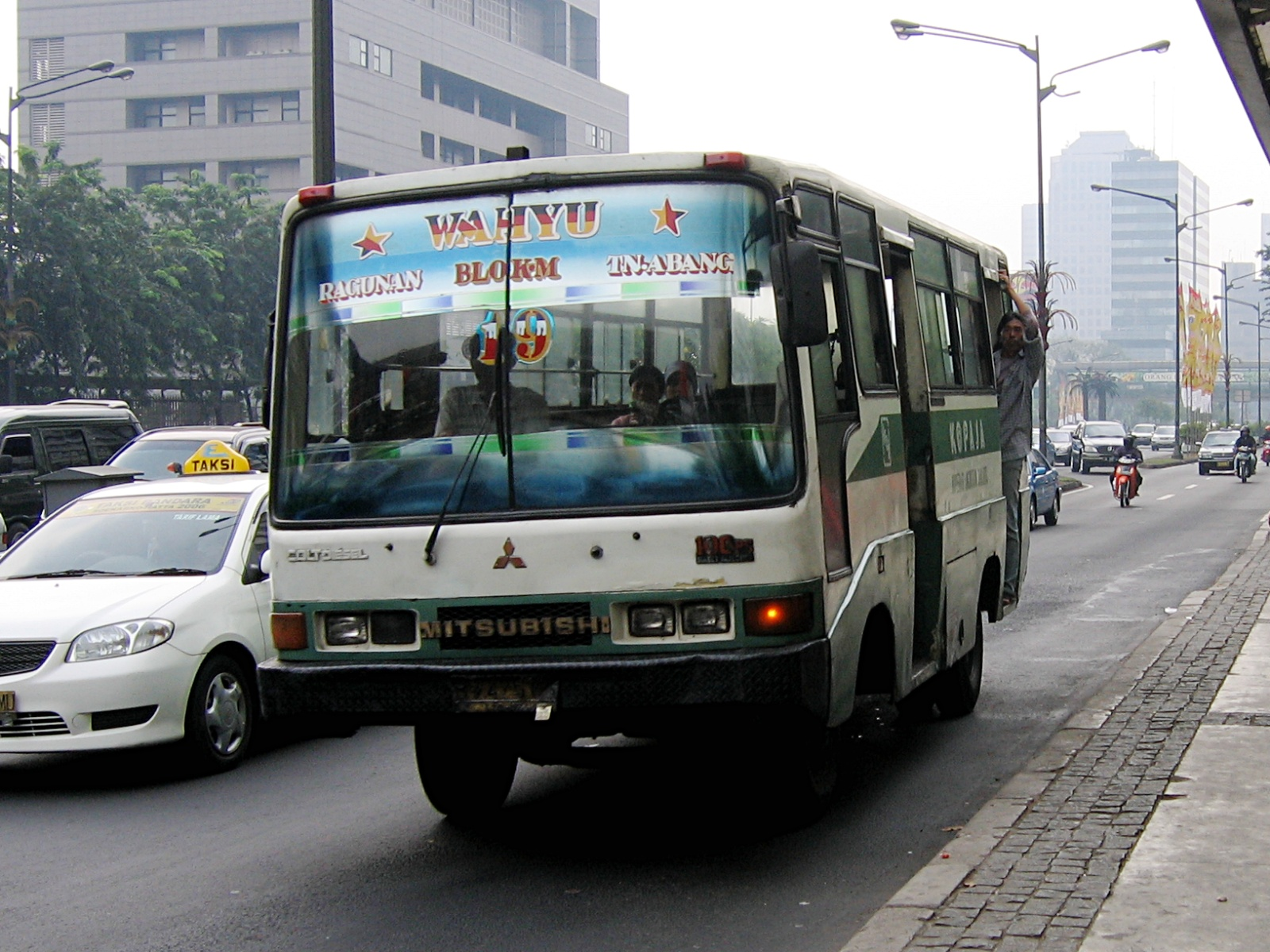
- Kopaja buses in Sudirman avenue

Overview
- Locale: Jakarta, Indonesia
- Transit type: Minibus

Operation
- Began operation: 1962
- Ended operation: 2020 (Replaced in role by Metrotrans and Minitrans)

Koperasi Angkutan Jakarta or Kopaja (Jakarta Transport Cooperative) was a cooperative established in 1971 to provide public transport services in Jakarta. There were reportedly over 1,400 minibuses in the Kopaja fleet in mid-2012, more than half of which were estimated to be over 20 years old.

Kopaja buses have a rated capacity of 20-30 seats like the similar MetroMini service. Kopaja buses are green and white. But despite the nominal capacity of 20-30 passengers, Kopaja buses are often heavily overloaded. Safety is often compromised by this practice of overloading. In addition, the drivers are often reckless and do not pay attention to traffic signs and other traffic. Further, Kopaja diesel vehicles are often badly maintained and contribute significant amounts of pollution in Jakarta. In late 2012, in response to criticisms the chairman of the Kopaja organisation admitted that around 70% of the Kopaja buses were not road worthy but said that improvements would need support from the Jakarta government.

Despite these problems the Kopaja bus service, like other low-cost bus transport options such as the small local Angkot vans, is a key part of the Jakarta transport network. There are numerous routes which crisscross the city and link into the Transjakarta Bus Rapid Transit (BRT) system. Fares, at Rp 2,000 per ride (around US 20 cents) for most services, are cheap. Efforts to upgrade the service by introducing newer air-conditioned Kopaja buses in 2012 have so far attracted limited custom because passengers are reluctant to pay the higher Rp 5,000 (about US 50 cents) price for the higher-quality buses. Other attempts are made from time to time by the Jakarta Government to improve services; in late 2015, for example, it was announced that the Government would provide new, larger buses on one of the Kopaja routes (route S66) and tighten up fare arrangements on the route.

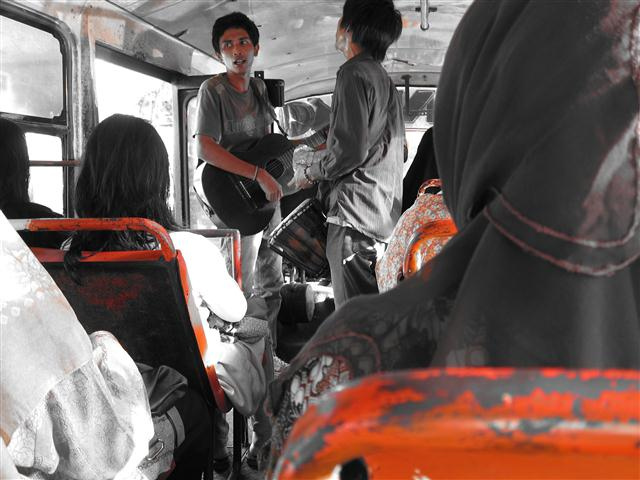
Busker on a Jakarta bus

It is not uncommon for buskers, often children, to jump aboard the Kopaja minibuses. However apart from hoping for a small contribution they rarely cause any trouble at all to passengers.

== Routes ==
Kopaja buses are numbered and travel along designated routes. The numbers are sometimes a little hard to spot since they are posted in a somewhat random fashion on the buses, usually on the front and back windows and sometimes (or alternatively) on the side windows as well. There are also designated bus stops but the bus stops are rarely used. Rather, passengers just wave down the slowly travelling passing buses and later just indicate the spot where they wish to alight. Conductors hanging out of the front or rear doors of the Kopaja, who are often shouting the destination as the buses travel along (such as, "Senen, Senen, Senen" on route No P.20 listed below), facilitate these arrangements.

The route that a Kopaja bus is following is usually listed on the front window of the bus (such as Tn. Abang - Ragunan for route No P.19 below). But somewhat confusingly, most buses have large garish names plastered across the front window as well such as Mawar (Rose), Bunga (Flower), Ikhlas (Sincere), Firdaus (Paradise) and even Sexy. These names, which often tend to obscure other details such as the route number and name, are merely decorations and do not provide information of any particular kind to commuters.

== List of routes ==
The following is the set of routes currently in service. The bus numbers and routes sometime show prefix letters which indicate the following:

- P = Central Jakarta (Jakarta Pusat)
- B = West Jakarta (Jakarta Barat)
- S = South Jakarta (Jakarta Selatan)
- T = East Jakarta (Jakarta Timur)
- U = North Jakarta (Jakarta Utara)

The routes are the following:

P.16
Tanah Abang - Slipi Jaya - Kemanggisan - Kedoya - Ciledug

P.19
Tanah Abang - Landmark - Karet Pasar Baru - Blok M - Fatmawati - Kemang - Ampera - Ragunan Depan

P.20 (Now became Transjakarta route 6H)
Lebak Bulus - TB. Simatupang (Cilandak Barat) - Warung Buncit - Mampang Prapatan - Rasuna Said - Setiabudi - Menteng - Gambir - Senen

U.27
Senen - Sunter - Kelapa Gading

T.57 (Now became Transjakarta route 7B)
Terminal Kp. Rambutan - Raya Bogor - Cililitan (PGC) - Dewi Sartika - Kalibata - Duren Tiga - Warung Buncit - Tendean - Wolter Monginsidi - Terminal Blok M.

S.66 (Now became Transjakarta route 6M)
Blok M - Rasuna Said - Setiabudi - Latuharhari - Sultan Agung (Pasar Rumput) - Manggarai

S.68
Ragunan Depan - Pasar Minggu - Kalibata Tengah - Duren Tiga - Pancoran - Tebet - Kampung Melayu

B.86 (Now became Transjakarta route 9E, being modified into Pasar Kebayoran Lama - Jelambar)
Lebak Bulus - Pondok Indah - Raya Simprug - Palmerah - Slipi - Grogol - Mangga Dua - Kota

B.88
Slipi - Grogol - Kalideres

T.502 (Now became Transjakarta route 5M)
Kampung Melayu - Matraman - Proklamasi - Cikini - Monas - Tanah Abang

S.602 (Now became Transjakarta route 6B, shortened until MH Thamrin due to construction of MRT Jakarta Phase 2A around Bundaran HI until MH Thamrin)
Ragunan Depan - Mampang Prapatan - Setiabudi - Komdak - Casablanca - Tanah Abang

S.605 (Blok M — Kampung Rambutan)
Blok M - Iskandarsyah - Melawai - Panglima Polim - Darmawangsa - Darmawangsa 4 - Darmawangsa 13 - Fatmawati - Abdul Majid - Kemang Selatan 8 - Kemang - Kemang Selatan - Ampera - TB Simatupang - Masuk Tol AMPERA~1 - Keluar Tol~30 "Cililitan—Cijantung" - Terminal Kp. Rambutan

S.605A (Blok M — Ragunan Depan) (Now became Transjakarta route 6N)
Blok M - Prapanca - Kemang - Kemang Selatan - Ampera - TB Simatupang - Harsono - Terminal Ragunan (Ragunan Depan).

S.608 (Now became Transjakarta route 8C, being moved from Blok M to Kebayoran Lama)
Blok M - CSW - Mayestik - Kebayoran Lama - Simprug - Senayan Belakang - Palmerah - Tanah Abang

S.609 (Now became Transjakarta route 1M)
Blok M - Kebayoran Lama - Cipulir - Meruya

S.612 (Now became Transjakarta route 5N)
Ragunan Belakang — Cilandak - Kemang Timur Raya - Mampang Prapatan - Pancoran - Tebet - Kampung Melayu

S.613 (Now became Transjakarta route 8E)
Blok M - Bintaro

S.614 (Now became Transjakarta route 6T, shortened until Velbak)
Pasar Minggu - Warung Buncit - Pejaten Barat - Ampera - Kemang Selatan - Benda - Puri Sakti - Antasari - Taman Brawijaya - Darmawangsa 15 - Darmawangsa - Darmawangsa 6 - Wijaya 2 - Panglima Polim - Kramat Pela - Barito 2 - Barito 1 - Kyai Maja - Velbak - Cipulir

S.615
Lebak Bulus - Blok M - Palmerah - Tanah Abang

S.616 (Now became Transjakarta route 9H, being moved to Universitas Indonesia)
Blok M - Tendean (Trans TV) - Pancoran - Pasar Minggu - Cipedak

S.606
Pasar Minggu - Lenteng Agung - Srengseng Sawah

S.63
Depok - Lenteng Agung - TB. Simatupang - Masuk Tol Lenteng Agung 2 - Keluar Tol Ampera 2 - Ampera - Kemang - Jeruk Purut - Antasari - Kantor Walikota Jaksel - Terminal Blok M

S.620
Pasar Rumput - Pancoran - Blok M

S.13 (Air Conditioned)
Ragunan Belakang - Cilandak KKO - TB. Simatupang - Pondok Indah - Gandaria - Mayestik - CSW - Semanggi - Slipi

B.95
Rawa Bokor - Taman Anggrek
