= E-Toll (Indonesia) =

Smart card to pay road tolls in parts of Indonesia

A standard e-toll card (older designs)

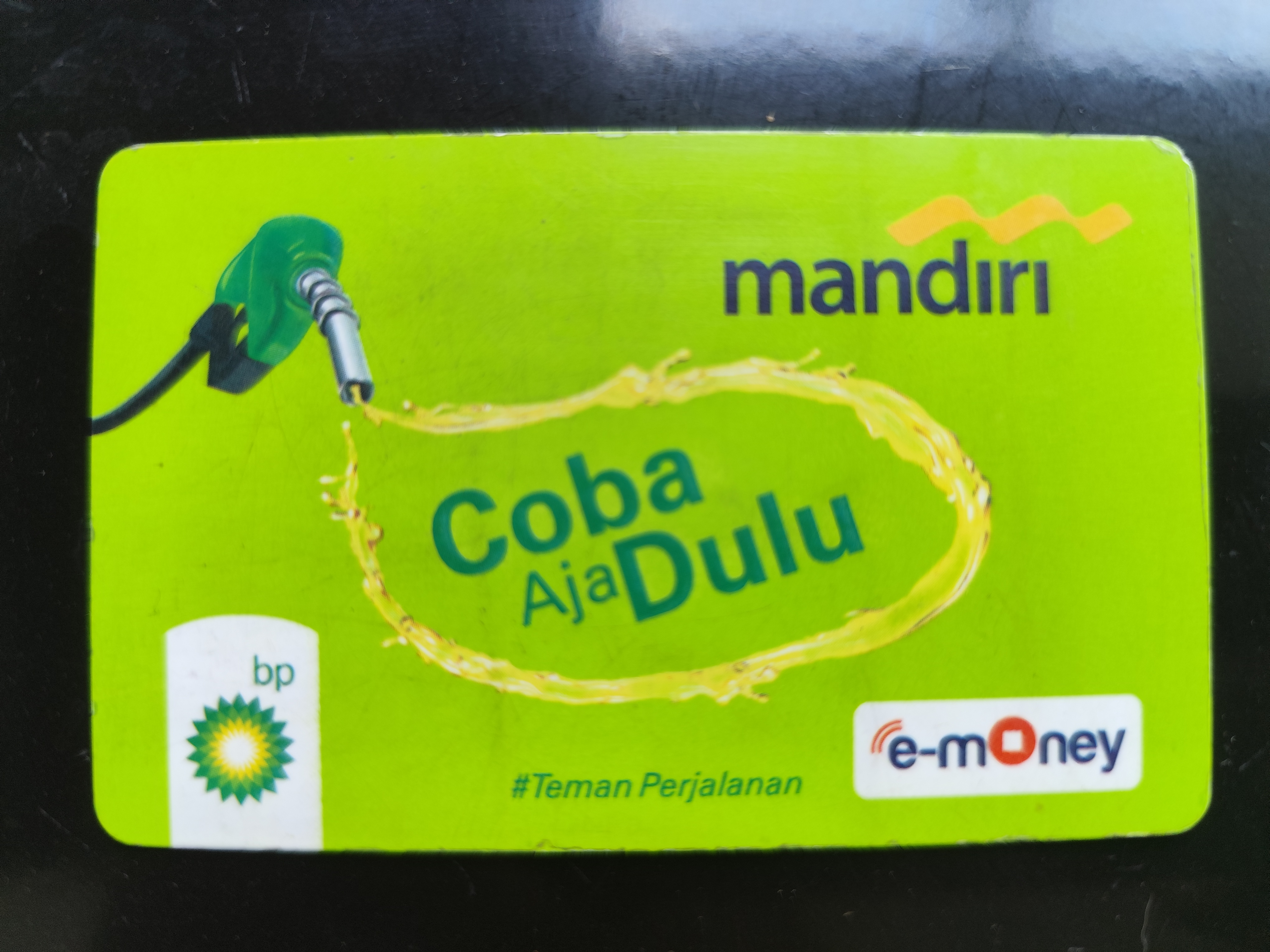
A BP-themed limited edition of e-money card

e-toll or e-toll card, now officially as Mandiri e-money, is an Indonesian contactless smart card used by toll road drivers to pay the toll fee. The card is issued by Bank Mandiri in cooperation with 3 toll operators (PT Jasa Marga Tbk, PT Citra Marga Nusaphala Persada Tbk and PT Marga Mandala Sakti). This card used the RFID system.

The card can be used to pay the toll fee at almost all toll roads at Sumatra, Java, Borneo and Bali.

== Purchase and top-up ==
Now, this card can also be used to pay the toll fee at Jakarta–Cikampek Road (Gate Pondokgede Barat & Pondokgede Timur) and Jakarta Outer Ring Road (JORR). Next projects, all Toll Road can accept e-Toll Card payment system. e-Toll Card can be purchased at all Bank Mandiri and Indomaret outlets in the Jabodetabek Area (Jakarta–Bogor–Depok–Tangerang–Bekasi) and several toll gates' offices.

It can be reloaded from range Rp 100,000 - Rp 1,000,000. This card also can be reloaded from Bank Mandiri's e-channels : ATM Mandiri (cash and non-cash), Internet Banking Mandiri, SMS Banking Mandiri, and EDC Mandiri.

== See also ==
- Electronic money
- List of smart cards
