= Transjakarta =

Bus Rapid Transit system in Jakarta, Indonesia

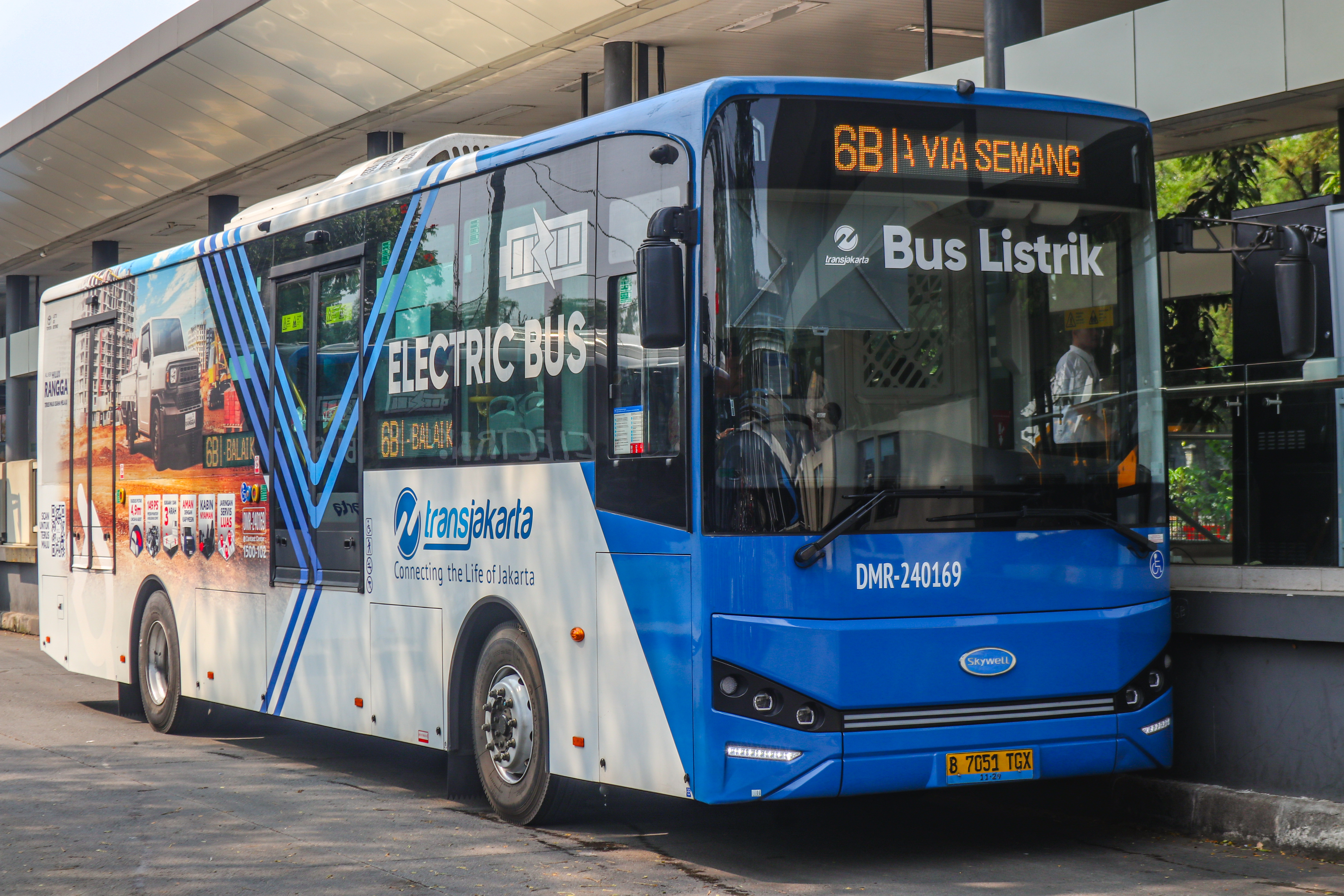
- Transjakarta fleet with Golden Dragon (Skywell) chassis

Overview
- Owner: Provincial Government of DKI Jakarta
- Area served: Greater Jakarta
- Locale: Jakarta, Indonesia
- Transit type: Bus rapid transit
- Number of lines: 14 (5 planned)
- Number of stations: 252
- Daily ridership: 1.6 million (2025 daily peak)
- Annual ridership: 413 million (2025)
- Chief executive: Welfizon Yuza
- Headquarters: Jalan Mayjen Soetoyo, Jakarta, 13650, Indonesia
- Website: transjakarta.co.id

Operation
- Began operation: 15 January 2004; 22 years ago
- Operator: see below

Technical
- System length: 264.6 kilometres (164.4 mi)
System map
At present map of Transjakarta's main corridors

A Transjakarta articulated bus on Transjakarta Corridor 2

Transjakarta (stylised in all-lowercase, often erroneously called Busway sometimes shortened as TJ, and branded as TiJe) is a bus rapid transit (BRT) system in Jakarta, Indonesia. The first BRT system in Southeast Asia, it commenced operations on 15 January 2004 to provide a fast public transport system to help reduce rush hour traffic. The system is considered Jakarta's premier public transit offering. The buses run in dedicated lanes (busways), and ticket prices are subsidised by the regional government.

Transjakarta has the world's longest BRT system (251.2 kilometres [156.1 mi] in length), which operates about 5,000 buses, of which 470 are electric. Transjakarta aims to have 50 percent of its fleet be electric buses by 2027. By 2030, the aim is for the entire Transjakarta ecosystem to use electric buses. As of March 2026, it serves an average of 1.4 million passengers daily and covers 92.5% of Jakarta's area.

The system is operated by municipally owned company PT Transportasi Jakarta. However, many of its fleet is operated by private companies alongside the company itself.

== History ==
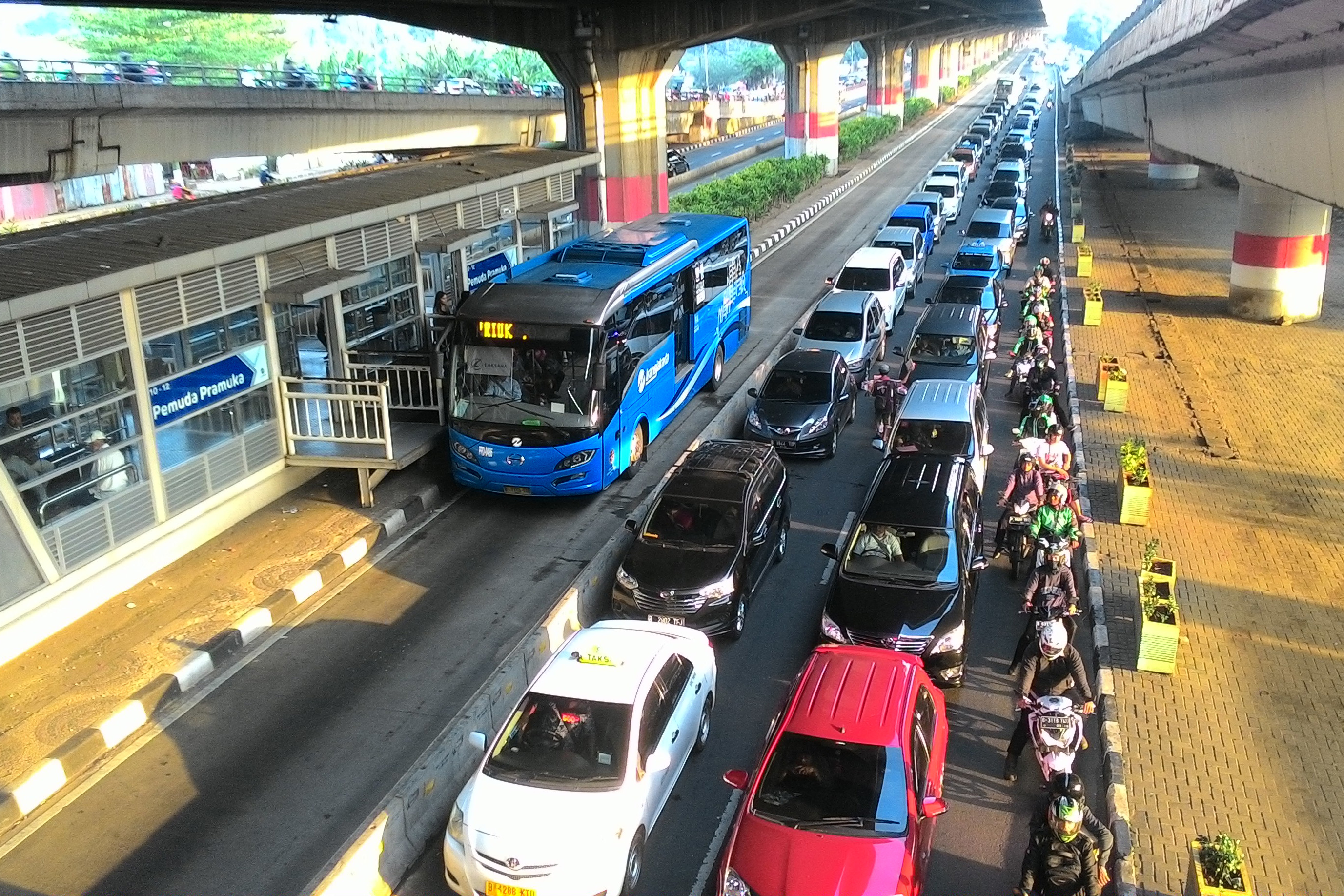
Transjakarta bus on the dedicated bus lane separated from heavy traffic

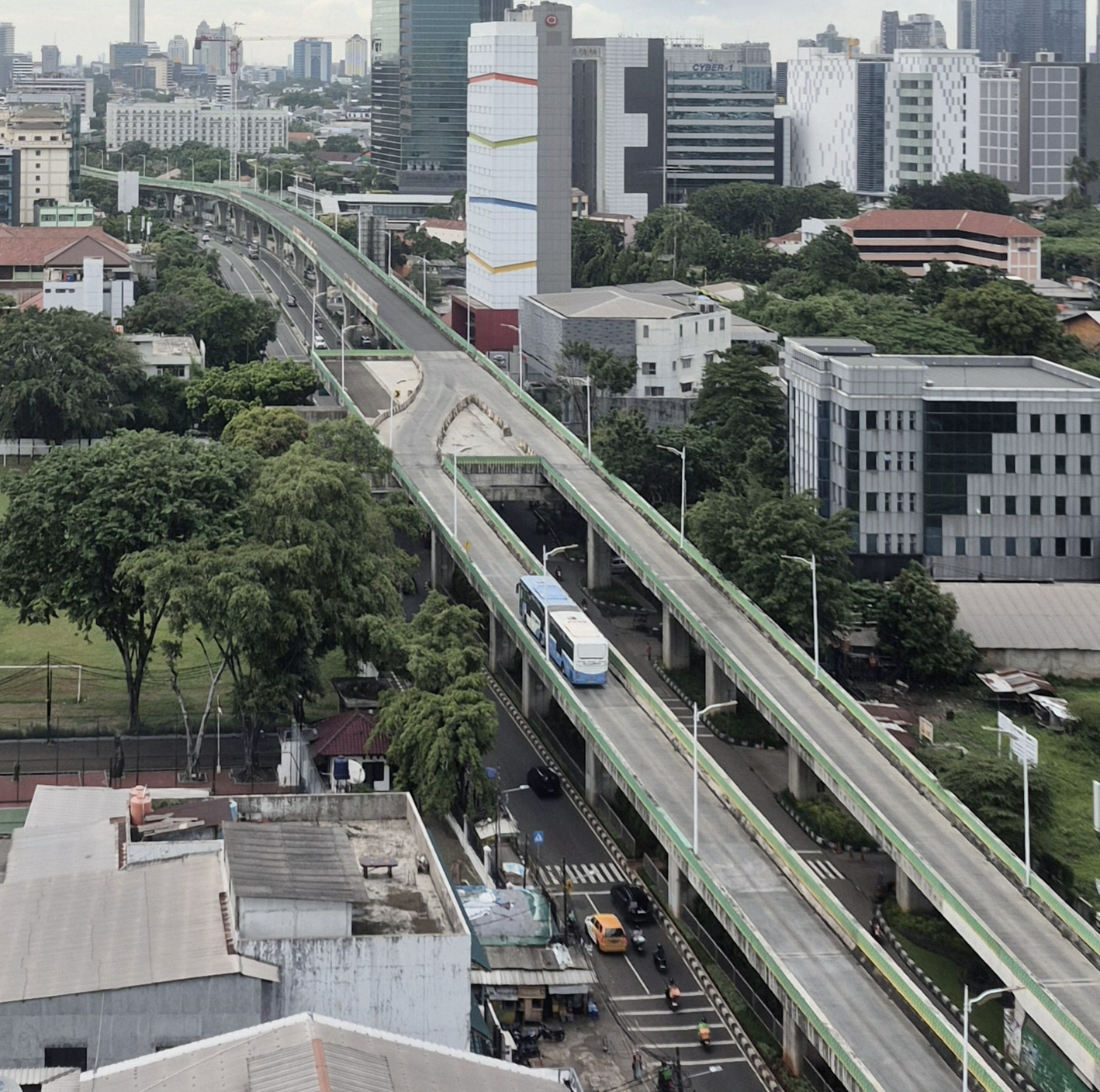
Corridor 13 features dedicated overpass.

Transjakarta was conceived to provide a fast, comfortable, and affordable mass transportation system in Jakarta. The proposal for a BRT system was emerged in 2001; Governor of Jakarta at the time, Sutiyoso proposed four mass public transportation modes in Jakarta:

- Mass-rapid transit (MRT), with the construction of the first line beginning in late 2013 and opening in March 2019.
- Monorail, which began construction in 2004 but was halted shortly thereafter. The construction was expected to resume in 2013 but was eventually permanently cancelled two years later.
- Bus rapid transit (BRT), by carrying the concept from the TransMilenio system in Bogotá, Colombia.
- Water transport (waterway), which was short-lived.

The MRT was considered a long-term goal thanks to its speed and capacity, but it required large foreign investment. At the time, Indonesia lost investor confidence due to concerns about domestic instability in the early 2000s, following the fall of the New Order regime in 1998, so the MRT construction could not be realised. Among those four, the bus rapid transit was considered the most likely to be realised in the near future because it didn't require foreign investment.

The Institute for Transportation and Development Policy (ITDP) was an important party accompanying the BRT planning process. The initial concept was created by PT Pamintori Cipta, a transportation consultant who had frequently worked with the Jakarta Office of Transportation (Dinas Perhubungan Provinsi DKI Jakarta). Apart from the private sector, several other parties supported the project, including the United States Agency for International Development (USAID) and University of Indonesia's Center for Transportation Studies (UI–CTS).

The buses were given lanes restricted from other traffic and separated by concrete blocks on the streets that became part of the busway routes. The first Transjakarta line opened to the public on 15 January 2004. It was free to ride for the first two weeks, after which commercial operations started on 1 February 2004.

Currently, Transjakarta has 14 main BRT corridors and 17 cross-corridor BRT services. In addition, there are about 200 non-BRT services that serve beyond the exclusive busway corridors to serve smaller streets as well as neighbouring suburbs. The number of Transjakarta buses has also increased dramatically, from 605 medium-to-large buses in 2015 to about 4,700 in 2026. The fare has remained Rp3,500 (27 US cents) per passenger since operations began. In November 2020, Transjakarta won the 2021 Sustainable Transport Award.

== Operations ==
Inside a Transjakarta bus fleet during rush hour.

=== Routes ===
15 corridors were initially planned, 14 of which are currently in operation. Corridors 1 to 12 and Corridor 14 operates at a ground level, mostly separated from mixed traffic by roadblocks. Corridor 13 is the first and only corridor to feature a dedicated elevated track.

Other than the 14 main BRT corridors, Transjakarta operates 17 cross-corridor BRT services, 64 non-BRT services operating within the city border, 18 non-BRT services operating into the satellite cities called Transjabodetabek, 10 premium non-BRT services called Royaltrans, 3 city tour services called Bus Wisata, 65 routes consists of Metrotrans electric buses and 100 microbus services called Mikrotrans.

Most services run from 5:00am to 10:00pm daily. The 24-hour overnight service called AMARI is available for the 14 main BRT corridors as well as 4 Mikrotrans services.

Corridor #	Origin-Destination	Length of Line	Opened	BRT Standard (2025)
Transjakarta Corridor 1	Blok M – Kota	15.48 km	15 January 2004	Silver
Transjakarta Corridor 2	Pulo Gadung – Monumen Nasional	17.88 km	15 January 2006	Bronze
Transjakarta Corridor 3	Kalideres – Monumen Nasional	16.14 km	15 January 2006	Bronze
Transjakarta Corridor 4	Pulo Gadung – Galunggung	12.33 km	27 January 2007	Bronze
Transjakarta Corridor 5	Ancol – Kampung Melayu	13.58 km	27 January 2007	Bronze
Transjakarta Corridor 6	Ragunan – Galunggung	15.90 km	27 January 2007	Bronze
Transjakarta Corridor 7	Kampung Rambutan – Kampung Melayu	12.57 km	27 January 2007	Basic BRT
Transjakarta Corridor 8	Lebak Bulus – Pasar Baru	25.33 km	21 February 2009	Basic BRT
Transjakarta Corridor 9	Pinang Ranti – Pluit	31.57 km	31 December 2010	Basic BRT
Transjakarta Corridor 10	Tanjung Priok – PGC	19.11 km	31 December 2010	Basic BRT
Transjakarta Corridor 11	Pulo Gebang – Kampung Melayu	13.86 km	28 December 2011	Basic BRT
Transjakarta Corridor 12	Pluit – Tanjung Priok	23.30 km	14 February 2013	Basic BRT
Transjakarta Corridor 13	CBD Ciledug – Tegal Mampang	14.18 km	14 August 2017	Basic BRT
Transjakarta Corridor 14	JIS – Senen Toyota Rangga	9.7 km	11 November 2023	Basic BRT
TransJakarta Corridor 15	JIS – Pulo Gebang	TBD	(planned)	TBD
16	Kampung Melayu – Harmoni	TBD	(planned)	TBD
17	Ancol – Tanjung Priok	TBD	(planned)	TBD
18	Puri Kembangan – Pluit	TBD	(planned)	TBD
19	Manggarai – UI	TBD	(planned)	TBD

==== Timeline ====
- 15 January 2004: Corridor 1 (Blok M to Kota) began a public trial run.
- 1 February 2004: Corridor 1 (Blok M to Kota) started commercial operations.
- 15 January 2006: Corridor 2 (Pulo Gadung to Harmoni) and Corridor 3 (Kalideres to Pasar Baru) became operational.
- 27 January 2007: Corridor 4 (Pulo Gadung to Dukuh Atas), Corridor 5 (Kampung Melayu to Ancol), Corridor 6 (Halimun to Ragunan) and Corridor 7 (Kampung Rambutan to Kampung Melayu) became operational.
- 10 September 2008: Grogol and RS Sumber Waras stations began serving Corridor 3. Pemuda Rawamangun and Pramuka BPKP stations began serving Corridor 4. Gunung Sahari and Salemba Carolus stations began serving Corridor 5.
- 21 February 2009: Corridor 8 (Lebak Bulus to Harmoni) became operational.
- 31 December 2010: Corridor 9 (Pluit to Pinang Ranti) and Corridor 10 (PGC to Tanjung Priok) became operational.
- 18 March 2011: Corridor 1 and Corridor 9 extended service hours to 11:00pm. Services beyond 10:00pm skipped several stations.
- 20 May 2011: Corridor 2 and Corridor 3 extended service hours to 11;00 pm, but only 9 out of 22 stations on Corridor 2 and 9 out of 13 stations on Corridor 3 served beyond 10:00pm.
- 1 July 2011: Corridors 4 to 7 extended their service hours, leaving only Corridor 8 without service beyond 10:00pm.
- 28 September 2011: Three non-BRT services launched with Route 1 from West Jakarta Municipal Office to Daan Mogot Ave, Route 2 from Tanah Abang KRL station to Medan Merdeka Selatan Blvd and Route 3 from Sudirman CBD to Bundaran Senayan BRT station. The fare was Rp6,500 ($0.72), which covered both the non-BRT and BRT tickets. However, these services were short-lived due to low ridership.
- 13 December 2011: Transjakarta implemented a policy of segregating male and female passengers, following the KRL Commuterline's example. The area between the driver's cab and the middle set of doors was designated as a women-only area.
- 28 December 2011: Corridor 11 (Kampung Melayu to Walikota Jakarta Timur) became operational, with a shuttle bus between Pulo Gebang and Walikota Jakarta Timur. Jatinegara RS Premier station began serving both Corridors 11 and 5.
- c. 2011-2012: Corridor 6 was extended to Dukuh Atas 2. The main Corridor 8 service stopped serving RS Tarakan, Tomang Mandala, S. Parman Podomoro City, and Grogol 2 stations. Service 8A was introduced to serve these stations, running between Grogol 2 and Juanda. Corridor 9 stopped serving Kramat Jati, PGC 1, and BKN stations and was diverted to Jagorawi Highway between Garuda Taman Mini and Cawang UKI stations.
- 14 February 2013: Corridor 12 (Pluit to Tanjung Priok) became operational.
- 19 May 2014: The extension of Corridor 2 (Pulo Gadung to Harapan Indah) became operational.
- 1 June 2014: Transjakarta introduced two new overnight services, AMARI (Angkutan Malam Hari) and ANDINI (Angkutan Dini Hari), which operate from 10:00pm to 5:00am the next day, effectively making the network operational 24 hours a day. Overnight services were only available for Corridors 1, 3, and 9.
- 4 June 2014: Due to the construction of Jakarta MRT Phase 1, Masjid Agung, Bundaran Senayan, and Karet stations were relocated to temporary structures, while Bundaran HI and Setiabudi (Note: Not to be confused with the station of the same name on Corridor 6, formerly called Setiabudi Utara.) stations were closed and demolished.
- May 2015: Corridors 2, 5, 7, and 10 started overnight operations.
- July 2015: The western end of Corridor 12 was cut short, terminating at Penjaringan.
- c. 2016: Corridor 11 began through service from Kampung Melayu to Pulo Gebang.
- c. 2017-2018: Setiabudi Utara, GOR Sumantri, and Departemen Kesehatan stations were relocated to temporary structures during the construction of Jabodebek LRT.
- 16 August 2017: Corridor 13 (Puri Beta 2 to Tendean) became operational, but several stations on the elevated track were still not open to passengers.
- 1 March 2018: Swadarma and JORR stations began serving Corridor 13.
- 7 July 2018: Rawa Barat and Velbak stations began serving Corridor 13, leaving only CSW 1, which remained mothballed.
- 12 November 2018: Corridor 13 was extended to CBD Ciledug.
- 24 March 2019: Bundaran HI station was reopened after the MRT started operations.
- 12 August 2019: The eastern end of Corridor 12 was cut short, terminating at Sunter Kelapa Gading. The reason given was to reduce headways without sacrificing service, since the section between Sunter Kelapa Gading and Tanjung Priok was already served by Corridor 10.
- 4 December 2019: Due to the construction of Jabodebek LRT, Corridor 4 was temporarily extended to Tosari, while Dukuh Atas 2 station was relocated to a temporary structure.
- March 2020: Due to the COVID-19 pandemic, the overnight AMARI service hours were reduced to only 12:00am.
- 16 December 2020 to 25 July 2024: Pasar Baru station was closed for revitalisation works that would take a month. The station's revitalisation marked the start of a major network-wide revitalisation project to rebuild dozens of BRT stations. The stations were closed in several rounds and rebuilt using the Transjakarta's third-generation BRT station design. Stations that were rebuilt were Bundaran Senayan, Gelora Bung Karno, Bendungan Hilir, Dukuh Atas (both buildings), Tosari, Bundaran HI, Sarinah, Pulo Gadung (both buildings), Pulo Mas, Senen, Senen Sentral, Juanda, Balai Kota, Kwitang, Kalideres, Jembatan Baru, Jembatan Gantung, Indosiar, Grogol (both buildings), Pramuka BPKP, Manggarai, Pasar Rumput, Halimun, Kebon Pala, Pasar Jatinegara, Kampung Melayu, Ragunan, SMK 57, Jati Padang, PGC 1, Cawang UKI, Pasar Kebayoran Lama, Cikoko Stasiun Cawang, Pancoran Barat, Kuningan Barat, Gatot Subroto Jamsostek, Gatot Subroto LIPI, Semanggi, Slipi Petamburan and Stasiun Jatinegara 2. The last station, Semanggi, reopened on 25 July 2024.
- 18 December 2021: Corridor 12 was reextended to Pluit and Tanjung Priok. However, to this day, most buses still only serve the section between Penjaringan and Sunter Kelapa Gading, with only a limited number of buses going all the way to the terminus stations.
- 22 December 2021: The new CSW-ASEAN TOD building was opened, connecting CSW 1 (which had not been opened since the first day of Corridor 13's commercial operations) with two new Corridor 1 stations (Kejaksaan Agung and ASEAN) and the ASEAN MRT station. CSW 1 reopened as the last station on Corridor 13 to serve passengers.
- 1 March 2022: Transjakarta began operating Corridor 14 as a non-BRT service using low-floor Metrotrans buses. The announcement made it official that the Manggarai-to-UI route would be moved to Corridor 19, and that Corridor 14 would instead serve the newly built Jakarta International Stadium. The announcement included the list of stations that would serve Corridor 14.
- 12 September 2022: Approaching the end of the COVID-19 pandemic, AMARI service hours were reextended to 5:00am and began serving all the main BRT corridors. The overnight services had an "M" prefix before the corridor number, so the overnight Corridor 1 service was coded M1 and so on. Most overnight services serve the same route and stations as each respective daytime main corridor, except M12 (no services between Pluit and Penjaringan, and between Sunter Kelapa Gading and Tanjung Priok) and M13 (no services between Ciledug and Puri Beta 2).
- 23 February to 4 March 2023: Due to the construction of Jakarta MRT Phase 2A, Bank Indonesia, Harmoni, Mangga Besar, Sawah Besar, and Glodok stations were relocated to temporary structures. Because the temporary structures had a small passenger capacity, Corridors 2, 3, and 8 no longer served Harmoni since 4 March. Corridor 2 moved its terminus to Monumen Nasional, while Corridor 3 was diverted to terminate at Bundaran HI. Corridor 3 also began serving Petojo station. Pecenongan, Juanda, and Pasar Baru stations were taken over by Corridor 8, which itself took over RS Tarakan, Tomang Mandala, S. Parman Podomoro City, and Grogol 2 from Route 8A, rendering it defunct. There are now two variations of Corridor 8: The main route, which goes through Tomang, and the alternative route, which goes through Cideng, mimicking the original Corridor 8 by interlining with Corridor 3 from Petojo to Indosiar, stopping at RS Sumber Waras and Grogol 1.
- 24 March 2023: Setiabudi Utara, GOR Sumantri, and Departemen Kesehatan stations reopened after the LRT construction concluded.
- 23 May 2023: Dukuh Atas 2 station reopened, and Corridor 4 returned to terminate there.
- 29 May 2023: The adjusted Corridor 3 was cut short again, terminating at Monumen Nasional station.
- 11 November 2023: Corridor 14 (Jakarta International Stadium to Senen) became operational as a BRT corridor. As a main BRT corridor, it became a 24-hour route with overnight AMARI service.
- 1 January 2025: AMARI services were rebranded with the "M" prefix removed.

== Fleets ==
=== Current fleets ===
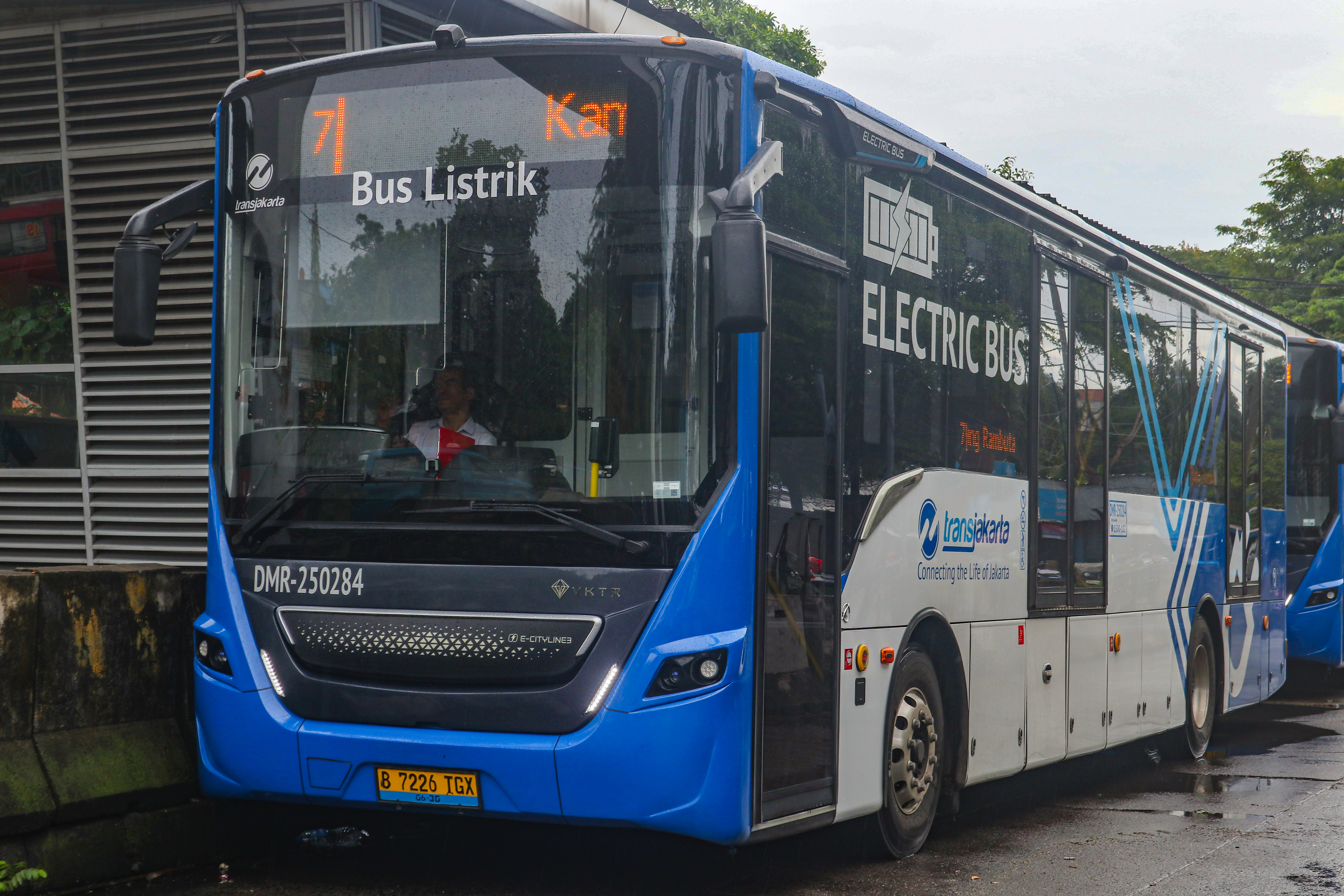
Transjakarta high-floor electric bus fleet

Each bus is constructed with passenger safety in mind. For example, the body frame is constructed from Galvanyl (Zn–Fe Alloy), a strong and rust-resistant metal. There are also eight or ten glass-shattering hammers mounted on some of the window frames, and three emergency doors for fast evacuation during an emergency. There are also two fire extinguishers at the front and back of the buses.

A typical high-floor bus is painted in a blue-and-white livery with the Transjakarta logo, but some buses are covered in advertising livery. Minitrans and low-floor Metrotrans buses typically feature orange-and-white livery. The buses are powered by compressed natural gas (CNG), diesel, or electric power. To facilitate passenger ingress and egress, buses are outfitted with at least two sets of doors on either side, while a partition separates the driver from passengers, enabling the driver to focus more intently on operating the vehicle.

The capacity of each bus varies from 85, 100 to 120 passengers. Single Mercedes-Benz, Hino buses and EV buses can carry about 85 passengers. Scania, Mercedes-Benz, and Volvo Maxi buses can carry 100 passengers, while a standard articulated bus can carry 120. A single route may feature a mix of bus types depending on demand.

High-floor buses are used for BRT services and non-BRT services that stop at BRT stations. This includes standard blue-and-white and Minitrans buses. Non-BRT services with no BRT integration typically use low-floor Metrotrans buses, except Royaltrans services, which have specialised buses. Mikrotrans services run exclusively with microbuses.

High-floor BRT buses feature at least two sets of BRT doors on each side, as well as a low-floor door on the left side at the front, which is used when the bus serves a non-BRT service with BRT integration. There are two types of Minitrans buses: The one with low-floor doors on the left in the middle, with BRT doors at the back, one on each side; and the one with a single low-floor door at the front, and two sets of BRT doors in the middle, one set on each side. Royaltrans buses feature a similar design to the former, but they lack the high-floor BRT doors. Mikrotrans services exclusively use microbuses that can carry fewer than 10 passengers. Non-BRT services with no BRT integration, other than Royaltrans and Mikrotrans, typically use low-floor Metrotrans buses that feature at least two sets of low-floor doors on the left side, with optional right-side doors or the third set of doors at the back, depending on the design.

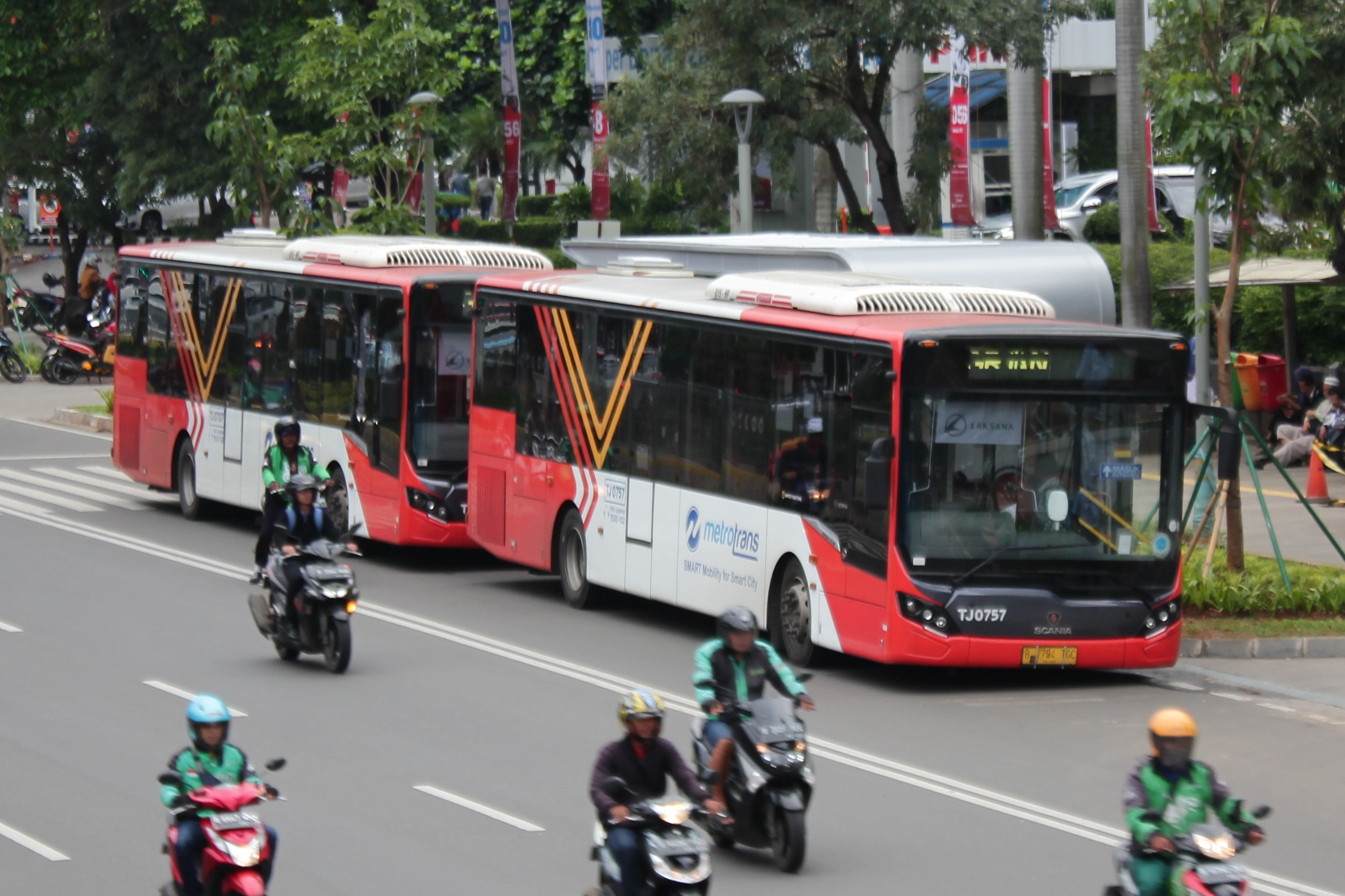
Two Metrotrans buses

High-floor BRT buses feature at least two sets of BRT doors on each side, as well as a low-floor door on the left side at the front. These buses are used for BRT and non-BRT services, with BRT integration, alongside Minitrans buses. There are two types of Minitrans buses: The one with low-floor doors on the left in the middle, with BRT doors at the back, one on each side; and the one with a single low-floor door at the front, and two sets of BRT doors in the middle, one set on each side. Royaltrans buses feature a similar design to the former, but they lack the high-floor BRT doors. Mikrotrans services exclusively use microbuses that can carry fewer than 10 passengers. Non-BRT services with no BRT integration, other than Royaltrans and Mikrotrans, typically use low-floor Metrotrans buses that feature at least two sets of low-floor doors on the left side, with optional right-side doors or the third set of doors at the back, depending on the design. All buses in service feature a swing door mechanism that opens and closes automatically and is controlled by the driver.

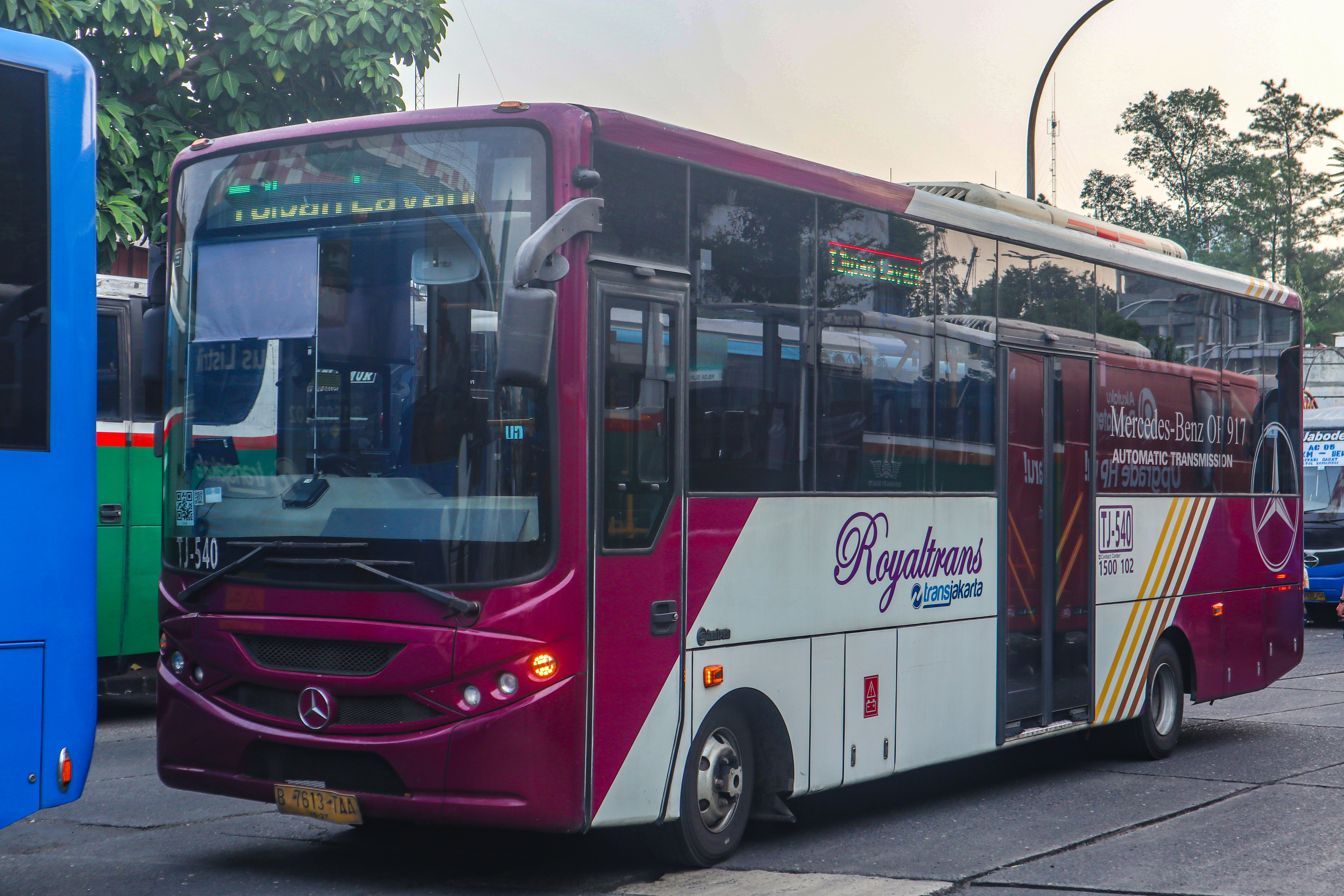
A Royaltrans bus

Transjakarta buses have electronic boards and speakers that announce stop names in Indonesian and English, bi-directional radio transceivers for communication between drivers and control centres, at least 4 mandatory CCTV cameras per bus, and automatic air freshener dispensers to keep the air fresh during rush hours. The announcer system, officially known as the On-Board-Unit (OBU), is synced to the bus's GPS position and automatically triggered by checkpoints along the bus route.

Single high-floor buses typically feature forward-facing seats in 2+1 (Minitrans only) or 2+2 (other buses) configuration. Metrotrans buses feature a 2+2 configuration in a rear- and forward-facing layout. Articulated high-floor buses feature a mix of side-facing seats and forward-facing seats. Royaltrans buses feature an all-forward-facing 2+2 configuration, while Mikrotrans buses feature a side-facing configuration. Transjakarta buses are designed to maximise the number of passengers carried rather than the number of seated passengers, and so all buses, except Royaltrans and Mikrotrans, feature numerous handgrips for standing passengers. Royaltrans and Mikrotrans passengers are prohibited from standing at any time during the journey.

Payment of fares is typically made at BRT stations. However, passengers who board non-BRT services at bus stops must tap their card on board to pay. Buses operating non-BRT services feature at least one Tap-on-Bus (TOB) machine next to the low-floor doors.

Royaltrans, as a premium service, provides passengers with premium-quality seats, free WiFi, USB charging ports, and onboard entertainment. Unlike other services, Royaltrans requires a pre-booked ticket to ride, and passengers must select a specific departure time and seat when booking. Royaltrans is not subsidised by the Jakarta Municipal Government, as its main purpose is to serve passengers from the satellite cities. It is not integrated with the BRT system.

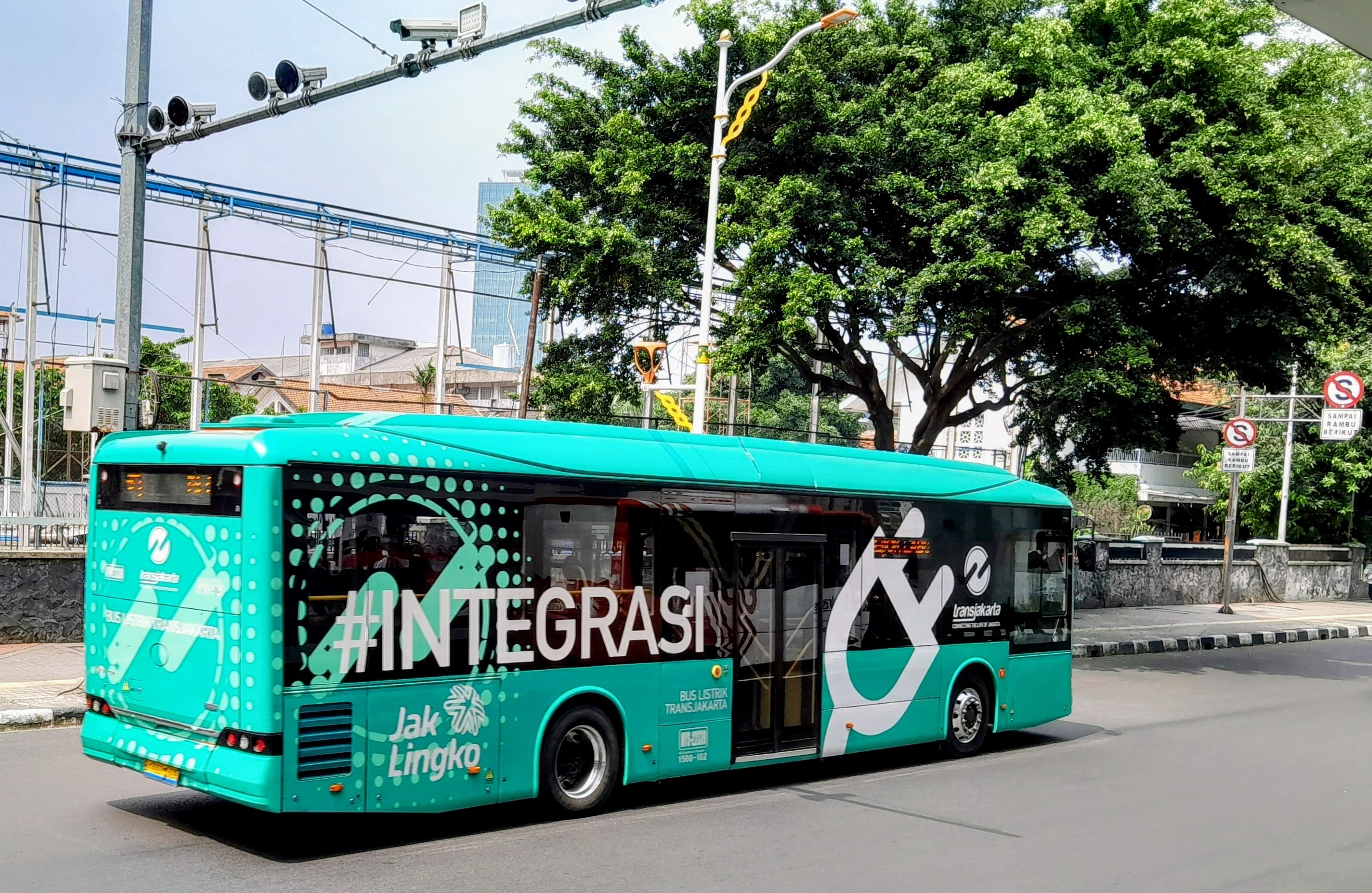
Transjakarta BYD B12 electric bus serving corridor 1E

Mikrotrans services run microbuses operated by various microbus corporations. Unlike all other Transjakarta buses, most Mikrotrans microbuses do not feature air conditioning, automatic doors, and a passenger announcement system. However, newer ones feature all these, and they are expected to gradually phase out older fleets lacking these features. They are free to ride, but passengers still need to tap in and tap out. They are not integrated with the BRT system.

Bus Wisata (city tour) buses are low double-decker buses that circle around major roads in Jakarta. They are free to ride and do not require passengers to tap their cards. They are also not integrated with the BRT system.

In terms of accessibility, high-floor and Minitrans buses are wheelchair-accessible only for passengers boarding at BRT stations, whereas Metrotrans and Bus Wisata buses are wheelchair-accessible at all boarding points. All these buses feature a designated wheelchair area. Royaltrans and Mikrotrans buses are not wheelchair-accessible.

Transjakarta Bus Fleet Information Table
Operator		Brand	Model	Fuel	Coachbuilder	Fleet Numbers	Image
Name	Code	Brand	Model	Fuel	Coachbuilder	Fleet Numbers	Image
PT. Transportasi Jakarta (self-managed)	**TJ**	(Sweden) Scania AB	K340IA CNG Euro VI	Compressed natural gas	Nusantara Gemilang	TJ 187	
PT. Transportasi Jakarta (self-managed)	**TJ**	(Sweden) Scania AB	K320IA CNG Euro VI	Compressed natural gas	Laksana	TJ 188-TJ 238	
PT. Transportasi Jakarta (self-managed)	**TJ**	(Sweden) Scania AB	K250UB 4x2 Euro III (as Metrotrans)	Diesel	Laksana	TJ 632-TJ 781	
PT. Transportasi Jakarta (self-managed)	**TJ**	(Germany) Mercedes-Benz	OH1526 NG M/T	Diesel	Rahayu Santosa, Laksana, Tentrem and Tri Sakti	TJ 247-TJ 346	
PT. Transportasi Jakarta (self-managed)	**TJ**	(Germany) Mercedes-Benz	OC 500 RF 2542	Diesel	Nusantara Gemilang	TJ 357-TJ 380	
PT. Transportasi Jakarta (self-managed)	**TJ**	(Germany) Mercedes-Benz	OH1626 A/T	Diesel	Laksana, Tentrem and Restu Ibu Pusaka	TJ 388-TJ 408 TJ 469-TJ 482	
PT. Transportasi Jakarta (self-managed)	**TJ**	(Germany) Mercedes-Benz	OH1626 M/T	Diesel	Laksana, Tentrem and Restu Ibu Pusaka	TJ 872-TJ 881	
PT. Transportasi Jakarta (self-managed)	**TJ**	(Germany) Mercedes-Benz	O500U 1726 (as Metrotrans)	Diesel	Nusantara Gemilang	TJ 782-TJ 871	
PT. Transportasi Jakarta (self-managed)	**TJ**	(Germany) Mercedes-Benz	O500U 1726 (as Metrotrans)	Diesel	Laksana	TJ 483-TJ 531	
PT. Transportasi Jakarta (self-managed)	**TJ**	(Germany) Mercedes-Benz	OF 917 RF (as RoyalTrans)	Diesel	Tentrem and New Armada	TJ 532-TJ 631	
PT. Transportasi Jakarta (self-managed)	**TJ**	(Japan) Hino Motors	RK1 JSNL-RHJ CNG Euro IV	Compressed natural gas	New Armada	TJ 409-TJ 468	
Perum DAMRI	**DMR**	(China) Zhongtong	LCK6180GC Doosan CNG Euro V	Compressed natural gas	Completely built-up from China	DMR 705-DMR 763	
Perum DAMRI	**DMR**	(China) Zhongtong	LCK6126EVGRA1	Electric	Completely built-up from China	DMR 240125-DMR 240154 DMR 250155-DMR 250224	
Perum DAMRI	**DMR**	(China) Skywell	NJL6126BEV BRT	Electric	Completely built-up from China	DMR 240155-DMR 240214 DMR 250225-DMR 250274	
Perum DAMRI	**DMR**	(China) Skywell	NJL6129BEV low-deck (as Metrotrans EV)	Electric	Completely built-up from China	DMR 230099-DMR 230124	
Perum DAMRI	**DMR**	(China) BYD	VKTR BYD HF-12 Tidar	Electric	Laksana	DMR 250275-DMR 250354	
PT. Mayasari Bakti	**MB**/**MYS**	(Sweden) Scania AB	K320IA CNG Euro VI	Compressed natural gas	Laksana	MB 1601-MB 1656	
PT. Mayasari Bakti	**MB**/**MYS**	(Sweden) Scania AB	K310IB 6x2	Diesel	Laksana	MYS 17001-MYS 17110 MYS 18111-MYS 18150	
PT. Mayasari Bakti	**MB**/**MYS**	(Germany) Mercedes-Benz	OH1626 A/T	Diesel	Laksana	MYS 18151-MYS 18202 MYS 19203-MYS 19223	
PT. Mayasari Bakti	**MB**/**MYS**	(Germany) Mercedes-Benz	OH1626 A/T	Diesel	Laksana	MYS 21224-MYS 21333	
PT. Mayasari Bakti	**MB**/**MYS**	(China) BYD	B12 (as Metrotrans EV)	Electric	Completely built-up from China	MYS 22334-MYS 22363 MYS 23364-MYS 23385	
PT. Sinar Jaya Megah Langgeng	**SJM**	(China) BYD	D9	Electric	Laksana	SJM 240001–SJM 240020	
PT. Bianglala Metropolitan	**BMP**	(Germany) Mercedes-Benz	OH1626 A/T	Diesel	Tri Sakti	BMP 242- BMP 251 BMP 220252-BMP 220299	
PT. Bianglala Metropolitan	**BMP**	(China) SAG Golden Dragon	XML6125JEVJ0C3 BRT	Electric	Completely built-up from China	BMP 240322–240411	
PT. Bianglala Metropolitan	**BMP**	(China) SAG Golden Dragon	XML6125JEVJ0C3 low-deck (as Metrotrans EV)	Electric	Completely built-up from China	BMP 230300-BMP 230321	
PT. Bianglala Metropolitan	**BMP**	(Japan) Isuzu	NQR71 (as Minitrans)	Diesel	Tri Sakti	BMP 240412-BMP 240431	
PT. Steady Safe Tbk.	**SAF**	(Sweden) Volvo	B11R	Diesel	Laksana	SAF 001-SAF 119	
PT. Bayu Holong Persada	**BHL**	(Japan) Hino Motors	RN8JSKA-SJJ R285 Automatic Transmission	Diesel	Laksana	BHL 220508-BHL 220515	
Koantas Bima (Koperasi Angkutan Lintas Bis Madya)	**KBM**	(Japan) Hino Motors	FB 130 / GB 150 M/T (as Minitrans)	Diesel	Tri Sakti	KBM 220001-KBM 220036	
Jewa Dian Mitra	**JDM**	(Japan) Hino Motors	GB 150 L A/T (as Minitrans)	Diesel	Laksana	JDM 230001-JDM 230074 JDM 240075-JDM 240094	
Metro Baru Transport	**MBT**	(Japan) Hino Motors	GB 150 L A/T (as Minitrans)	Diesel	Laksana	MBT 240601-MBT 240628	
Pusaka Satria Utama	**PSU**	(Japan) Isuzu	NQR 71 (as Minitrans)	Diesel	Laksana	PSU 240001-PSU 240018	
Sentra Glosia Indonesia	**SGI**	(Japan) Isuzu	Elf NQR-B (as Minitrans)	Diesel	New Lie Ling	SGI 240001-SGI 240015	
Trans Swadaya	**TSW**	(Japan) Mitsubishi Fuso	FE 84G BC (as Minitrans)	Diesel	New Armada	TSW 001-TSW 100	

=== Future fleet ===
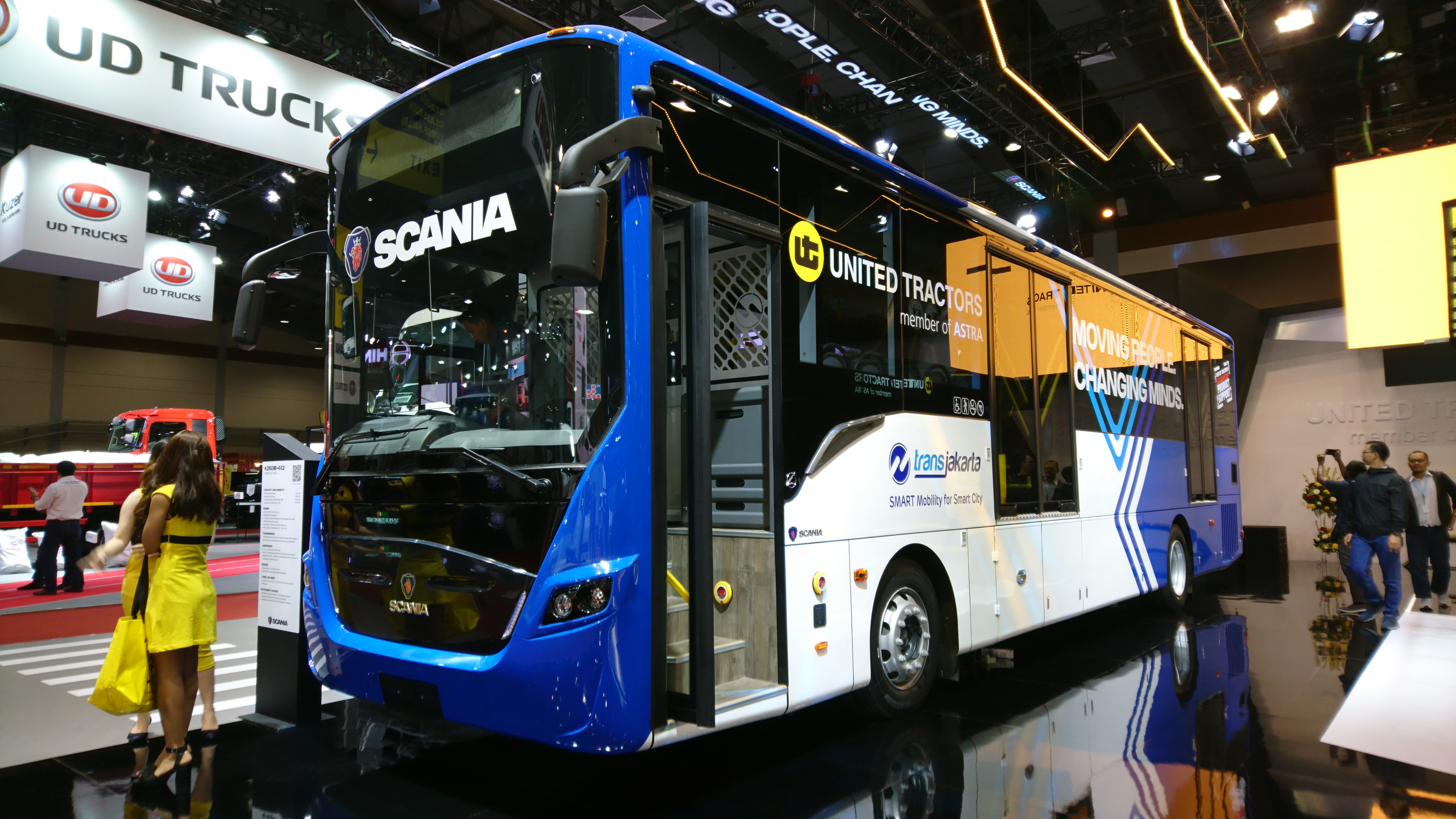
Transjakarta Scania K250IB for display at GIICOMVEC 2020 expo featuring Cityline 3 made by Laksana

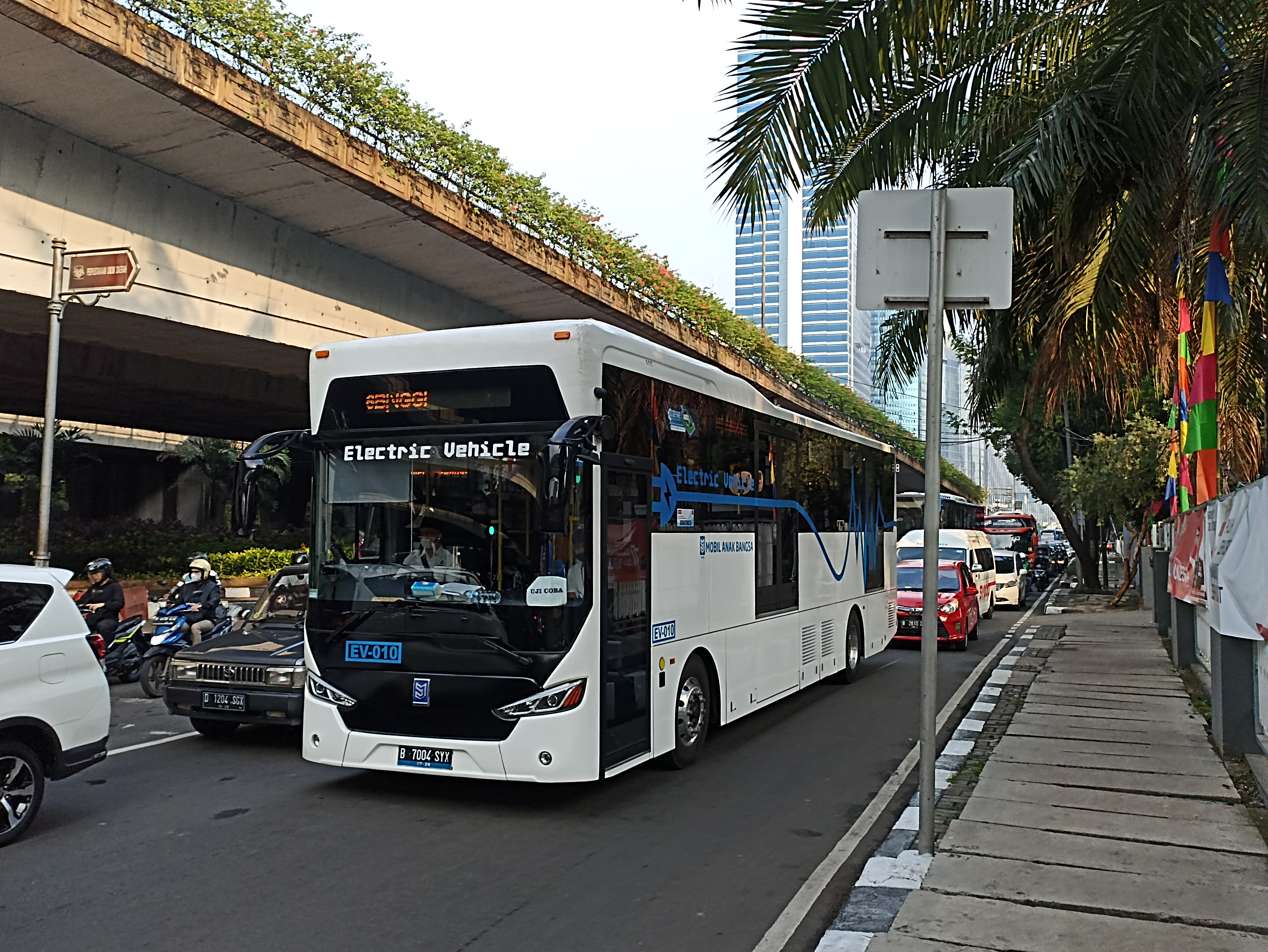
The MABI electric bus during a trial serving Corridor 6B

- PT. Mayasari Bakti
  Scania K250IB 4x2 Euro III
- Kopami Jaya (Koperasi Pengemudi Angkutan Mikrobus DKI Jakarta)
  Isuzu NQR71 as Mini Trans
- PT. Metro Mini
  Isuzu NQR71 as Mini Trans
- Kopaja (Koperasi Angkutan Jakarta)
  Mitsubishi Fuso FE 84G BC as Mini Trans
- Electric Vehicle (EV)
  MAB MD12E NF Electric bus, BYD K9 Electric bus, BYD C6, Higer Azure KLQ6125GEV, and INKA E-Inobus

Note: Transjakarta has stated that it will not buy any electric buses. Instead, electric buses will be operated by operators under the Rupiah-per-kilometer scheme. Currently all electric bus models listed is either under trial or is to commence trial in the near future.

==== Future or Prototype Fleet ====
Transjakarta Bus Fleet Information Table
Operator	Type	Hull No.	Bus Color	Fuel	Karoseri	Allocation	Image	Description
PT Bianglala Metropolitan	Golden Dragon SAG XMLS125JEVJ0C3	BMP xxxxxx	White-dark blue	Electric	CBU	TBA	TBA	Shown at GIICOMVEC 2020
PT Bianglala Metropolitan	Golden Dragon SAG XML6125JEVJ0C3	BMP xxxxxx	White-dark blue	Electric	CBU	TBA	TBA	ATPM-owned Prototype
Swakelola Transjakarta	BYD K9	EV 001	TBA	Electric	CBU	TBA		ATPM-owned Prototype
Swakelola Transjakarta	BYD C6	EV 002	TBA	Electric	CBU	TBA	TBA	ATPM-owned Prototype
Swakelola Transjakarta	Higer Azure KLQ6125GEV	EV 005	Blue combination	Electric	CBU	TBA		ATPM-owned Prototype
Swakelola Transjakarta	E-Inobus	EV 006	TBA	Electric	Mas Cup	TBA	TBA	ATPM-owned Prototype
Swakelola Transjakarta	MAB MD12E NF	EV 010	TBA	Electric	Karoseri Anak Bangsa	TBA	TBA	ATPM-owned Prototype
Swakelola Transjakarta	Foxtron Model T	EV 011	TBA	Electric	CBU	TBA	TBA	ATPM-owned Prototype
Swakelola Transjakarta	Zhongtong Bus V6	EV 018	TBA	Electric	CBU	TBA	TBA	ATPM-owned Prototype
Perum DAMRI (DMR)	Zhongtong Bus LCK6180GC	DMR 24xxxx	White-dark blue	Electric	CBU	TBA	TBA	ATPM-owned Prototype
Perum DAMRI (DMR)	Skywell NJL6129BEV	DMR 24xxxx	White-dark blue	Electric	CBU	TBA		ATPM-owned Prototype

=== Retired fleet ===
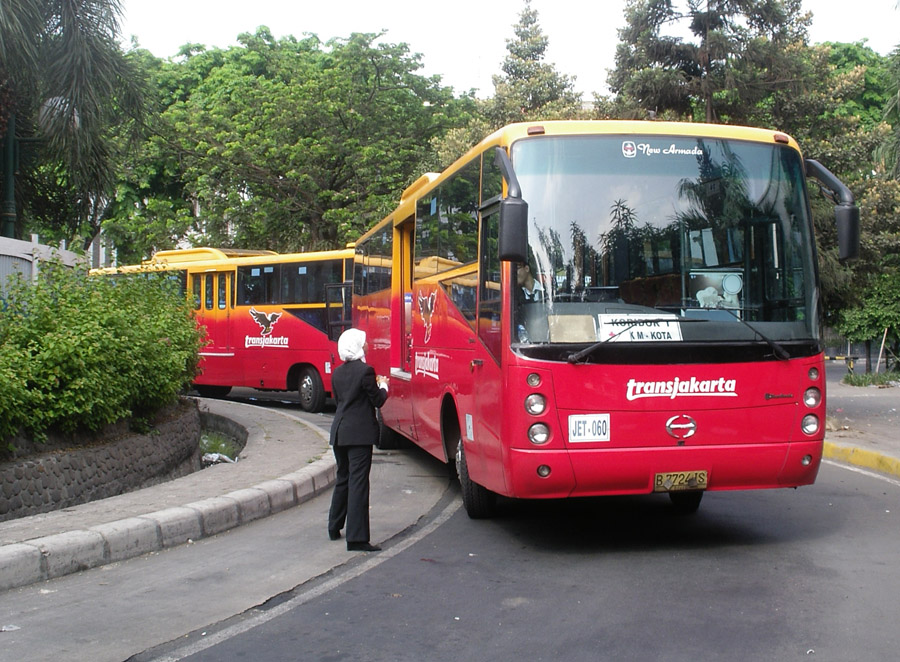
First generation of Transjakarta buses, Hino RG J08C-TI

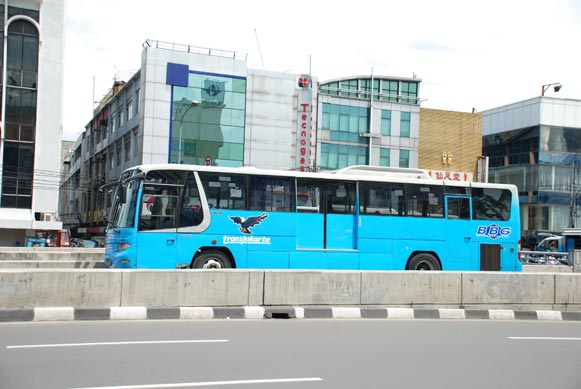
Blue and white CNG-fueled Daewoo buses of Corridor 2

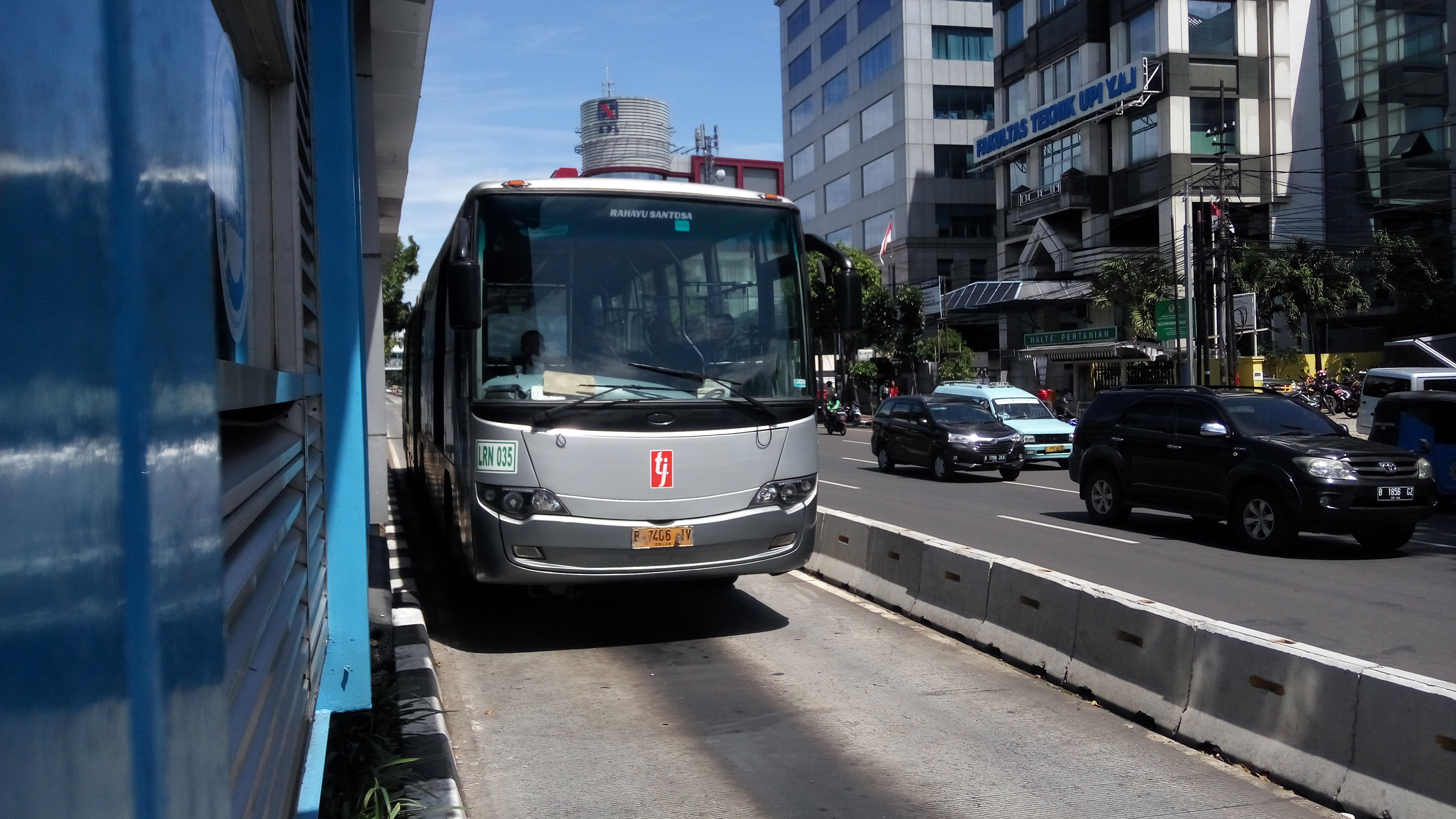
Locally made Komodo articulated bus

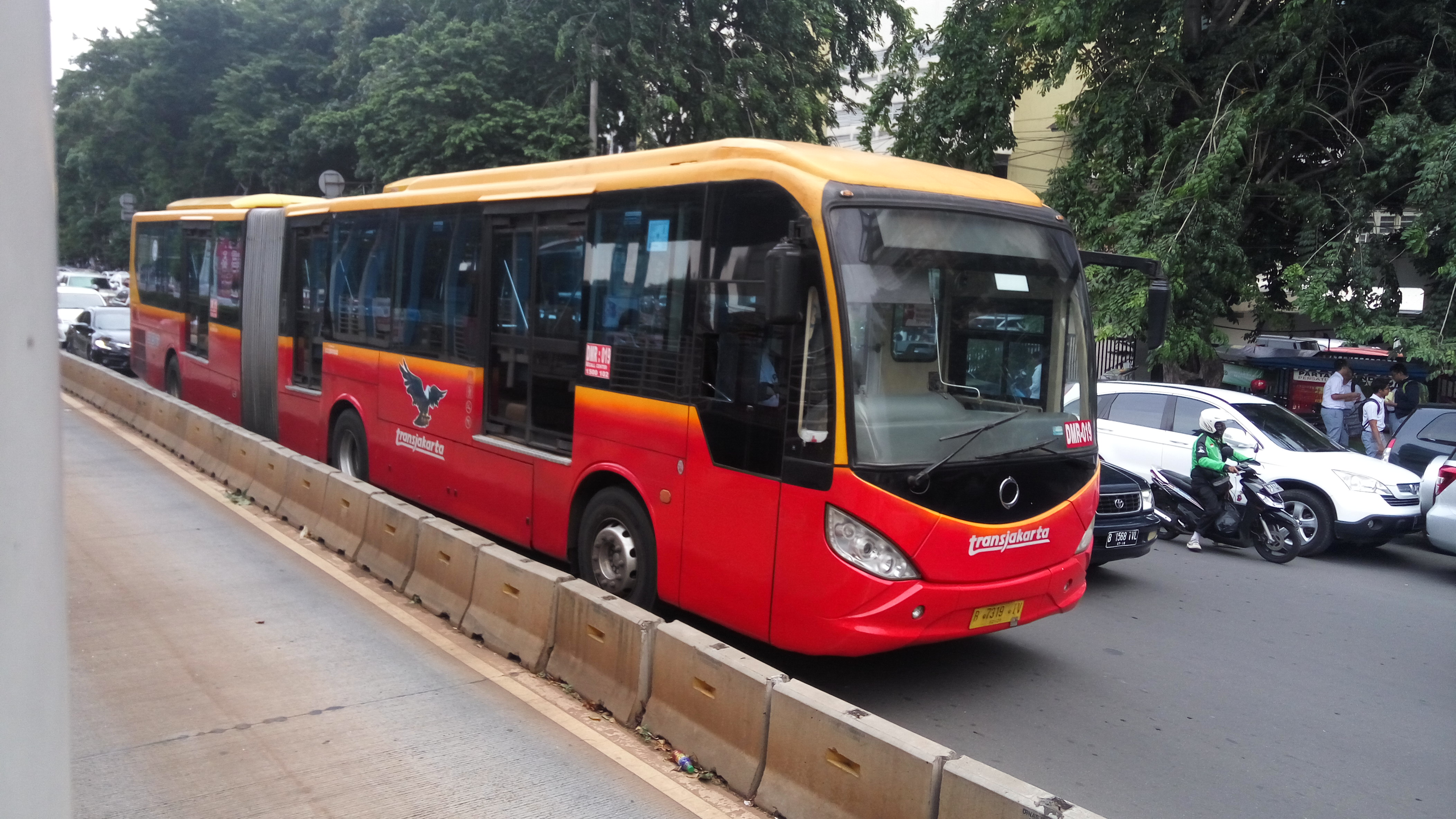
Locally made Inobus articulated bus

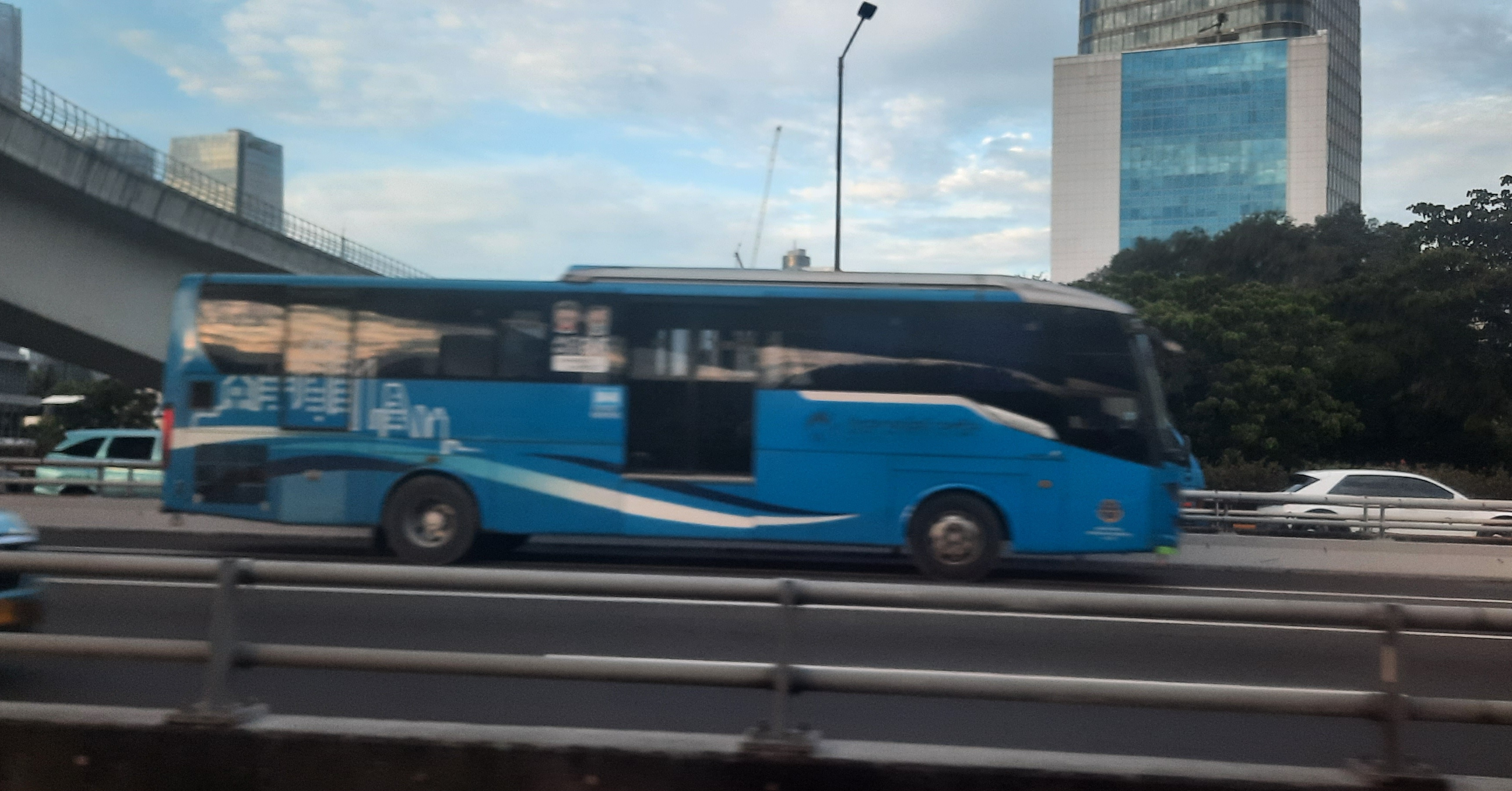
The retired Hino bus fleet belonging to Perum DAMRI has been sold to another company.

During the early years of Transjakarta, buses were colour-coded, and each type was assigned to a specific corridor. The Mercedes-Benz OH and Hino RG air-conditioned buses operating in Corridor 1 were painted red and yellow, with a picture of a young brahminy kite, resembling a bald eagle grasping a tree branch with three salaks. The buses used a special fuel blend of diesel and biodiesel. For Corridors 2 (bus colours: blue and white) and 3 (bus colours: yellow and red), the buses were CNG-fueled Daewoo buses imported from South Korea. Corridors 4, 5 and 6 used Grey Daewoo and Hyundai CNG buses, with Komodo and Huanghai articulated buses dedicated to Corridor 5. Grey Hino CNG buses were used for Corridors 7 and 8. Corridors 9 and 10 used red-coloured Hyundai and Komodo articulated buses, whilst Corridor 11 used red Inobus articulated buses. Corridor 12 used to use red coloured Ankai and Inobus buses as well. All older buses featured a side-facing seat configuration. They had folding or hydraulic sliding doors, while newer units had swing doors.

In August 2011, Transjakarta installed cameras on one bus for a trial period. The plan was to gradually install four cameras on each bus to improve services, such as informing passengers waiting for buses about how crowded approaching buses were and preventing sexual harassment.

Note: Bold text indicates current operators

Transjakarta Bus Fleet Information Table
Operator	Brand	Model	Gallery
PT. Jakarta Express Trans	(Germany) Mercedes-Benz	OH1521 Intercooler OM366LA	
PT. Jakarta Express Trans	(Japan) Hino Motors	RG J08C-TI	
PT. Trans Batavia	(Japan) Hino Motors	RK1 JSNL-RHJ CNG Euro IV	
PT. Trans Batavia	(South Korea) Daewoo	BH115E Doosan Infracore GE12TI	
PT. Jakarta Mega Trans	(South Korea) Daewoo	BH115E Doosan Infracore GE12TI	
PT. Jakarta Mega Trans	(South Korea) Hyundai	Aero-Hi Class C6AC	
PT. Jakarta Mega Trans	(China) Huanghai	DD6181S01 Cummins ISL G 320	
PT. Jakarta Mega Trans	(Indonesia) AAI	Komodo Doosan Infracore GE12TI	
PT. Jakarta Trans Metropolitan	(South Korea) Daewoo	BH115E Doosan Infracore GE12TI	
PT. Jakarta Trans Metropolitan	(South Korea) Hyundai	Aero-Hi Class C6AC	
PT. Jakarta Trans Metropolitan	(Japan) Hino Motors	RK8 JSKA-NHJ R260	
PT. Primajasa Perdanarayautama	(Japan) Hino Motors	RK1 JSNL-RHJ CNG Euro IV	
PT. Eka Sari Lorena	(Japan) Hino Motors	RK1 JSNL-RHJ CNG Euro IV	
PT. Eka Sari Lorena	(Indonesia) AAI	Komodo Doosan Infracore GE12TI	
**PT. Bianglala Metropolitan**	(Indonesia) AAI	Komodo Doosan Infracore GE12TI	
**PT. Bianglala Metropolitan**	(Indonesia) INKA	Inobus Cummins ATC 320 CNG Series Euro V	
**PT. Bianglala Metropolitan**	(South Korea) Hyundai	Aero Class C6AC	
**PT. Bianglala Metropolitan**	(China) Ankai	HFF6180G02D Weichai CNG Euro IV	
**PT. Bianglala Metropolitan**	(Japan) Hino Motors	RG J08C-TI	
**PT. Bianglala Metropolitan**	(Japan) Hino Motors	RK8 JSKA-NHJ R260, in cooperation with PPD and DAMRI)	
**PT. Bianglala Metropolitan**	(Germany) Mercedes-Benz	OH1521 Intercooler OM366LA	
PT. Trans Mayapada Busway	(South Korea) Hyundai	Aero Class C6AC	
PT. Trans Mayapada Busway	(Indonesia) AAI	Komodo Doosan Infracore GE12TI	
**Perum DAMRI**	(Indonesia) INKA	Inobus ATC 320 GNG Series Euro V	
**Perum DAMRI**	(Japan) Hino Motors	RK8 JSKA-NHJ R260	
**Perum DAMRI**	(China) Zhongtong	LCK6180GC Doosan Euro V	
**PT. Transportasi Jakarta (self-managed)**	(China) Zhongtong	LCK6180GC Doosan CNG Euro V	
**PT. Transportasi Jakarta (self-managed)**	(China) Yutong	ZK6180HGC Weichai CNG Euro III	
**PT. Transportasi Jakarta (self-managed)**	(China) Ankai	HFF6180G02D Weichai CNG Euro IV	
**PT. Transportasi Jakarta (self-managed)**	(China) Ankai	Ankai Single Bus HFF6120D17D	
**PT. Transportasi Jakarta (self-managed)**	(Japan) Hino Motors	RK8 JSKA-NHJ R260	
Kopaja	(Japan) Toyota	Dyna 110FT	
Kopaja	(Japan) Isuzu	NQR 71	
Kopaja	(Japan) Isuzu	FRR 90	
PT. Pahala Kencana	(Germany) Mercedes-Benz	OH1626 M/T	

== Stations ==
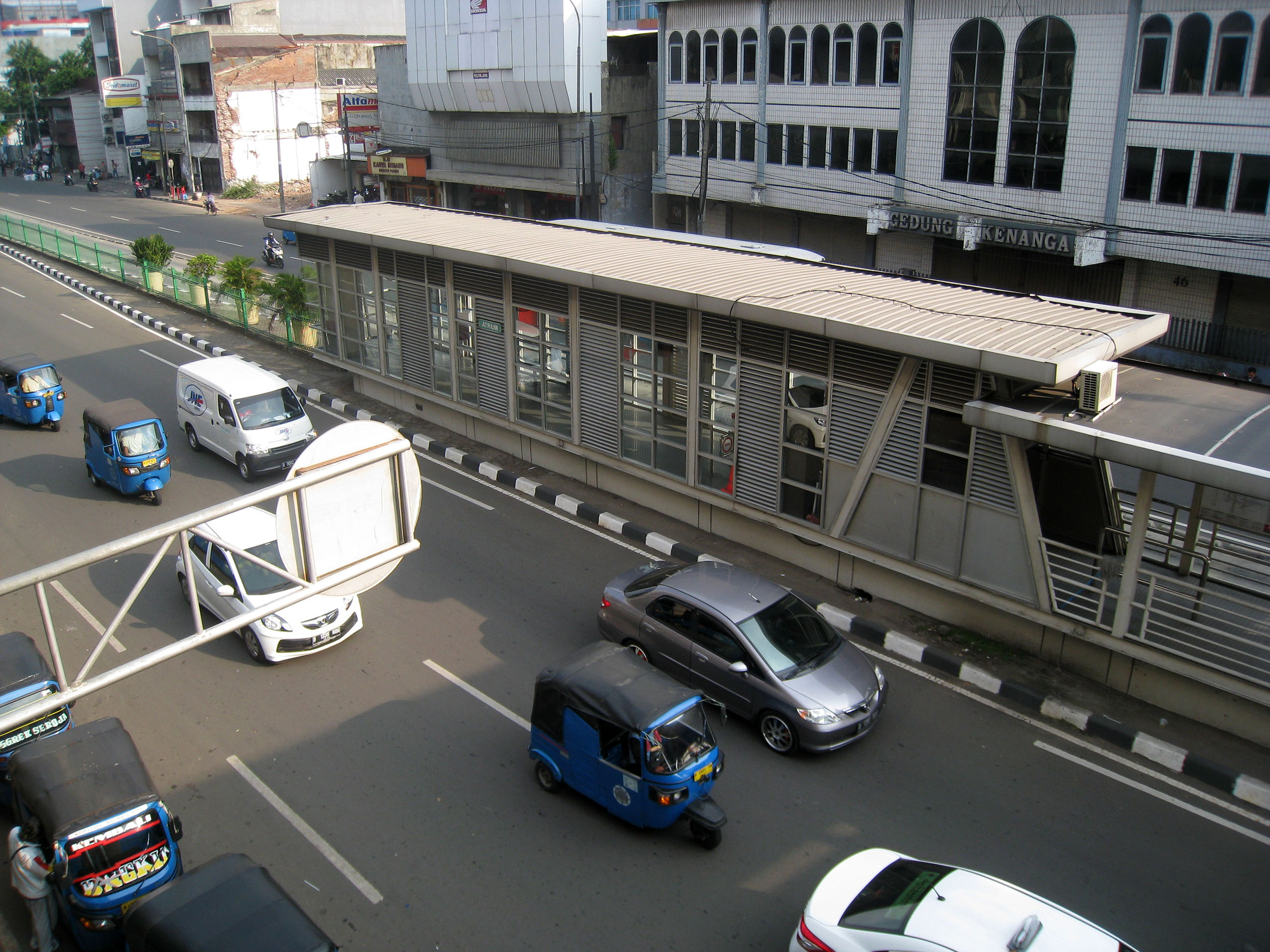
View of the Atrium (now Senen Raya) station from the stairs, taken in 2016. This is the typical design of older stations.

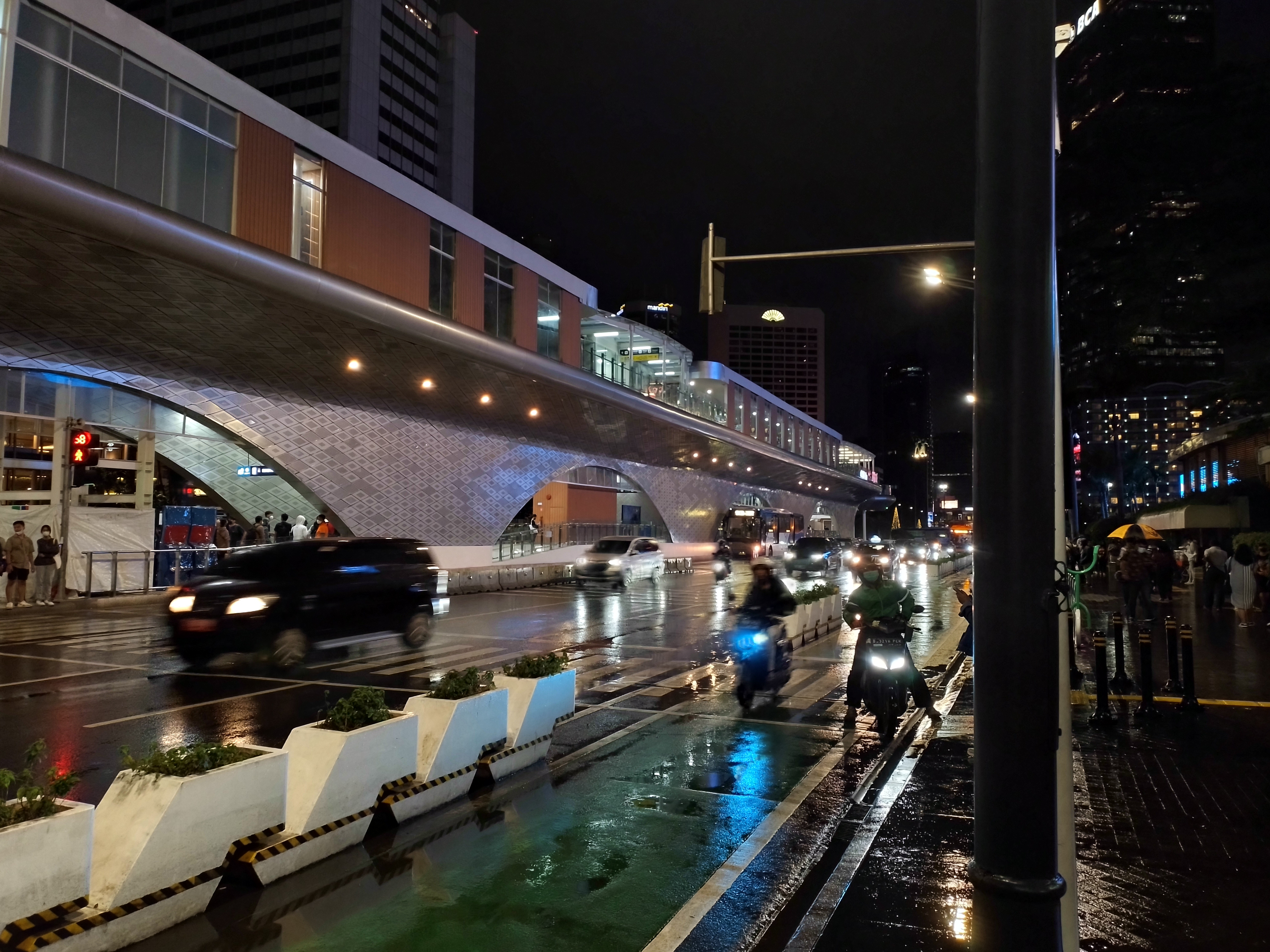
The iconic Bundaran HI Astra station that resembles a cruise ship

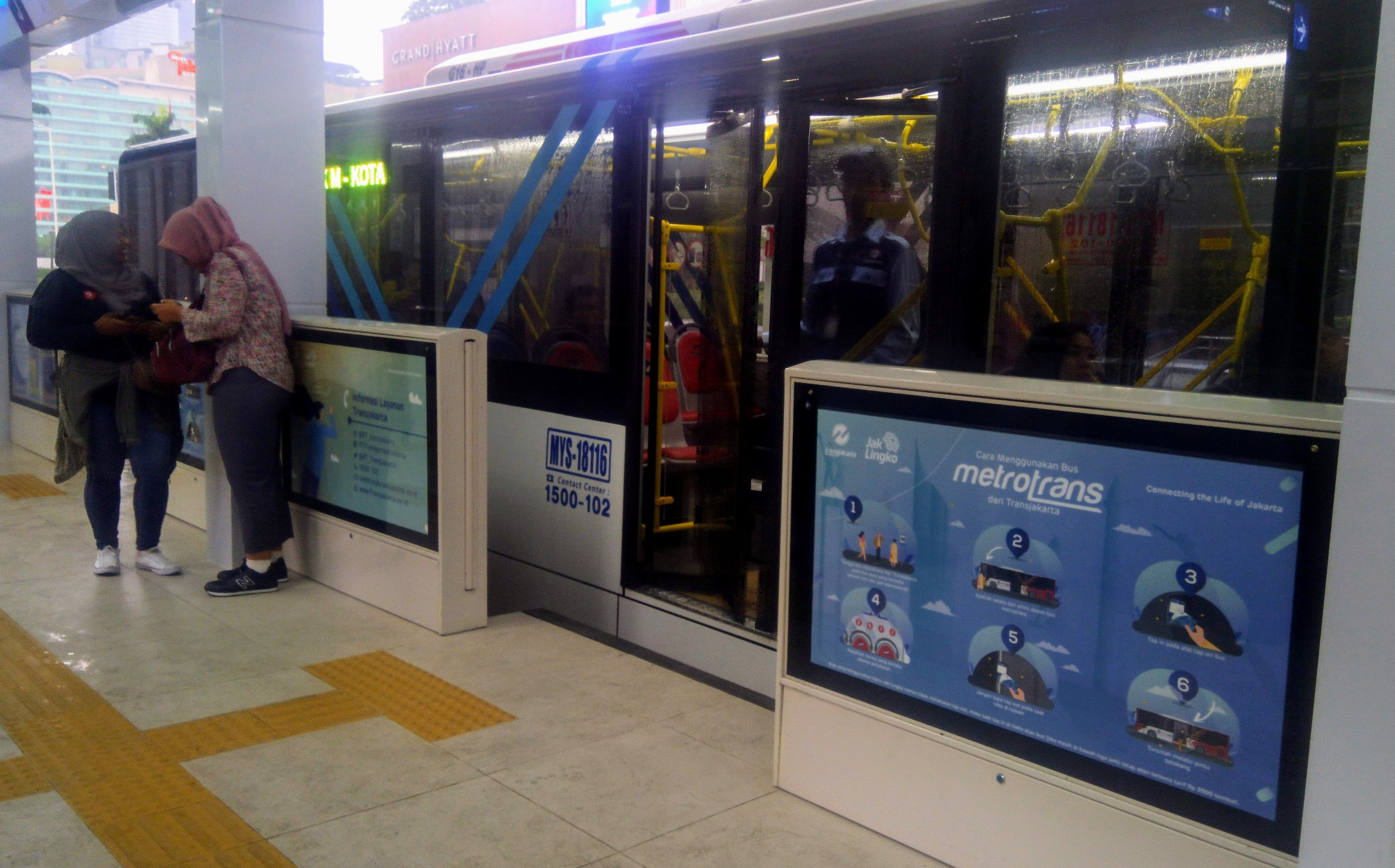
A station with new platform screen doors

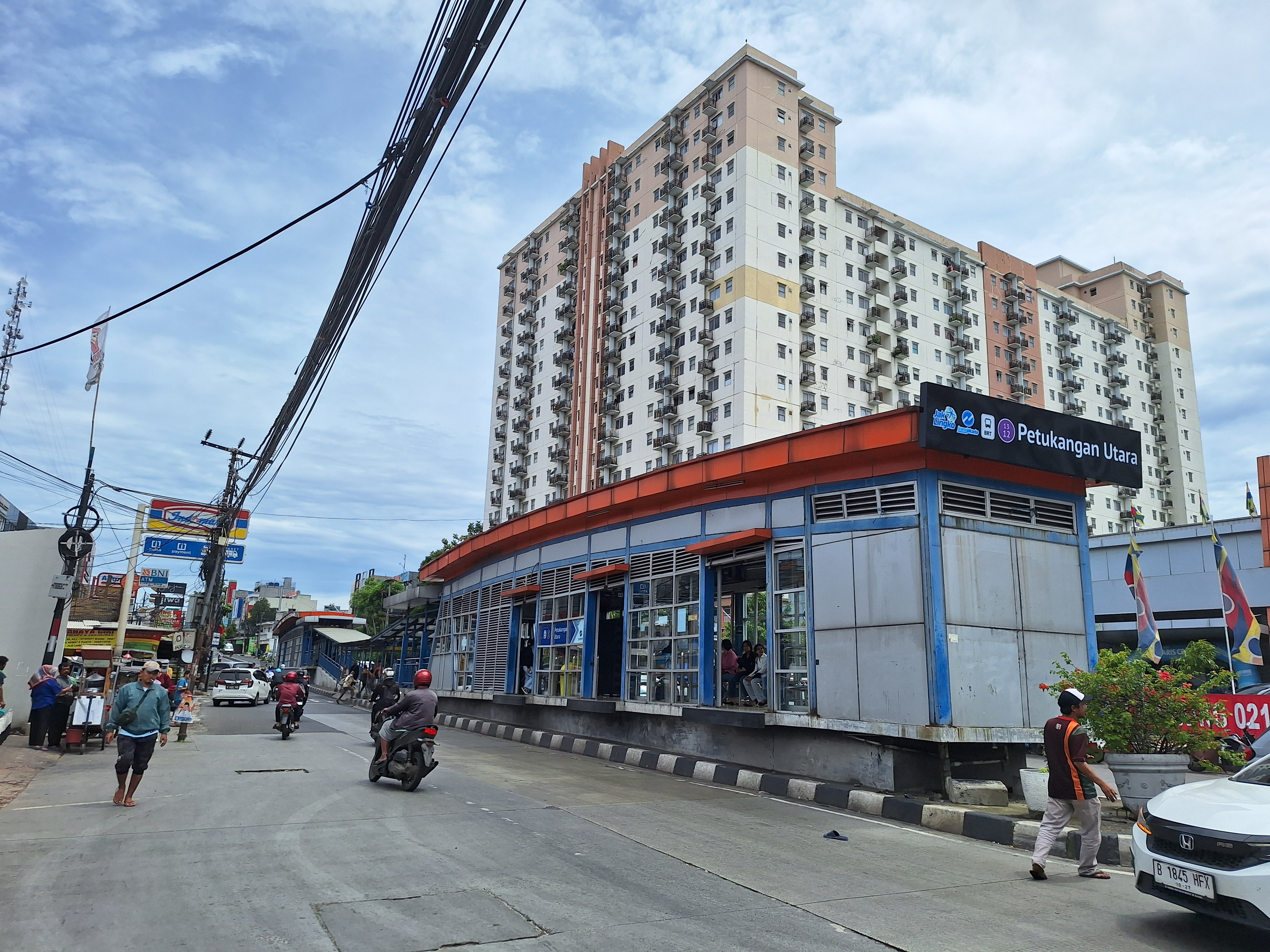
Some routes do not have a separate lane.

Transjakarta's BRT stations are typically located in the middle of the road and are connected by a skybridge, which may or may not include a lift or a ramp for step-free access. Passengers must use the bridge to enter the station. However, some stations use a pelican crossing instead. Most stations feature an island platform layout, with platform doors on each side for buses going towards opposite directions. However, some stations are one-way only or divided into two separate buildings, so one building features a side platform layout.

The first- and second-generation Transjakarta stations are primarily constructed from aluminium, steel, glass, and concrete. The walls are made of aluminium and glass covers, with tread plates constructing the floors. To ensure proper air ventilation, fins are installed on the aluminium parts of the stations. The concrete forms the supporting pillars of the shelters, which are usually painted blue. The second generation differed from the first in that they were typically longer and featured multiple sets of doors, unlike first-generation stations, which featured one set of doors on each side. Some first-generation stations were later extended using an extension building, which featured an open-air design with no aluminium fins and only supporting pillars.

The third-generation design, used since 2020, ditches the glass and aluminium and instead features concrete walls that are only half the height of a typical human, with no walls covering the space to the top, allowing air to move and circulate freely. The floors are also made of concrete, and all the pillars and covers are painted beige rather than grey or blue. Exceptions to this design apply to some stations that are part of a larger building (such as CSW, part of its TOD building, and Pulo Gebang station, part of the Pulo Gebang Bus Terminal building); as such, their designs resemble the buildings they are part of. Newer stations also feature platform screen doors to ensure passenger safety.

Older stations usually lack sanitary facilities, although newer ones include large and wheelchair-friendly restrooms and praying rooms (musalla).

Other facilities at a Transjakarta station include fans, top-up vending machines, and wayfinding boards. All stations are also equipped with passenger information system (PIS) displays for each platform direction, showing the estimated arrival times of upcoming buses. Some stations have two stories, with the upper story serving another corridor that passes through an overpass (such as Flyover Jatinegara, an interchange station for Corridors 10 and 11) or a commercial area with food chains and minimarkets (such as Bundaran HI Astra, M.H. Thamrin, Tosari, and Dukuh Atas).

Based on the services they serve, there are three types of Transjakarta stations. All of them serve at least one BRT corridor, and may also serve some cross-corridor BRT services and partially integrated non-BRT services.

- Standard BRT station: These stations serve one main BRT corridor. Most stations fall into this category.
- Standard interchange BRT station: These stations serve two or more main BRT corridors in one building. Examples include Monumen Nasional, Pulo Gadung, Kampung Melayu, Cawang Sentral, and some others.
- Pair-interchange BRT stations: In areas where two or more stations are located near each other, a skybridge is installed within the paid area to connect them. The pair of multiple stations serves as an interchange, allowing passengers to transfer between the two corridors by crossing the bridge without exiting the paid area. Examples include pairs of Grogol and Grogol Reformasi, Dukuh Atas and Galunggung, Bendungan Hilir and Semanggi, and some others.

In addition to BRT stations, non-BRT services also stop at regular pedestrian bus stops. All services—regardless of type—only stop at designated bus stops along the route and do not take passengers anywhere they stand. Designated pedestrian bus stops vary greatly in form from a building with a canopy or roof to just a "STOP" sign with a bus icon. The exception applies to the CSW 2 bus stop, part of CSW-ASEAN TOD, which is designed to resemble a BRT station, except with street-level platform screen doors, allowing easy transfer to BRT or another non-BRT route. All buses serving these bus stops stop at all stops on their respective route, regardless of whether a passenger is waiting.

Currently all the stations (except Corridor 13's CBD Ciledug, which still closes at 10:00pm) serves round-the-clock. Main BRT services run 24 hours a day. In addition, four Mikrotrans services also run round-the-clock.

Stations often become extremely overcrowded due to long, sometimes unpredictable, bus intervals. According to a 2011 report by the Indonesian Consumers Protection Foundation, the most common complaint from passengers about Transjakarta service was the long wait times at some main stations. This issue rearose during the 2020-2024 revitalisation project and closure of Harmoni station in 2023, with customers complaining that Monumen Nasional, as an interchange station and before it was expanded in 2025, did not have the capacity to handle high passenger volumes. Other stations that have been subject to controversy due to overcrowding are Cawang Sentral, Cawang Cililitan, Petamburan, Gerbang Pemuda, and Tanjung Duren.

From 23 December 2020, construction began on the revitalisation project of 46 BRT stations to improve passenger service, expand public spaces for tourism, and accelerate integration with other public transportation services. Tosari and Bundaran HI stations were revitalised into an iconic "twin cruise ships that anchored at the Selamat Datang Monument", with the upper floor being a commercial area and a photobooth balcony towards the monument. The project included the full reconstruction of the stations in a new third-generation design. The project was completed in 2024 with Semanggi being the last revitalised station to reopen.

On 4 March 2023, multiple stations along Corridor 1's road are temporarily closed and replaced by temporary stations to provide space for the Jakarta MRT's North–South Line extension project, requiring the demolition of the largest interchange station, Harmoni. These temporary stations are small and made up of two separate buildings for opposing directions, requiring passengers to tap and pay again to cross between them, making them unsuitable as interchange stations; as such, they only serve Corridor 1. This results in notable changes to routes previously stopping and terminating at Harmoni, with affected corridors and routes, notably Corridors 2, 3, and 8, being rerouted, and Monumen Nasional becoming the new temporary interchange hub. Some services deemed no longer needed or not possible due to road closures, such as 8A and 12M, were also scrapped.

In December 2023, Transjakarta announced it would rename many of its BRT stations. The changes were revealed and took place in January 2024, affecting every main corridor and 121 stations. The reason cited was due to "neutralise" station names from unofficial use of copyrighted names and names of deceased famous figures so that the company would be able to commercialise station names through official naming rights procedure, similar to that of Jakarta MRT and its stations. Another reason cited was to rename some stations to match the names of areas surrounding them or integrated railway stations, such as those in Kuningan and Cawang, which are named after their respective LRT station.

As of 2026, stations that have received naming rights are Bundaran HI Astra (awarded to Astra International), Senayan Bank Jakarta (formerly Gelora Bung Karno, awarded to Bank Jakarta [id]), Senen Toyota Rangga (awarded to Toyota Astra Motor), Widya Chandra Telkomsel (awarded to Telkomsel), Swadarma ParagonCorp (awarded to ParagonCorp [id]), and Petukangan D'MASIV (awarded to D'MASIV). Naming rights are also available for pedestrian bus stops, which currently is only Cawang Sentral 1 Polypaint (awarded to Polypaint Indonesia). Other naming rights are non-commercial and are considered fulfillment of Transjakarta's Corporate Social Responsibility (CSR), which include Simpang Ragunan Ar-Raudhah (awarded to Ar-Raudhah Mosque located nearby) and Smabel bus stop (awarded to the adjacent SMP Negeri 115 middle school, also known as Smabel).

== Ticketing and fares ==
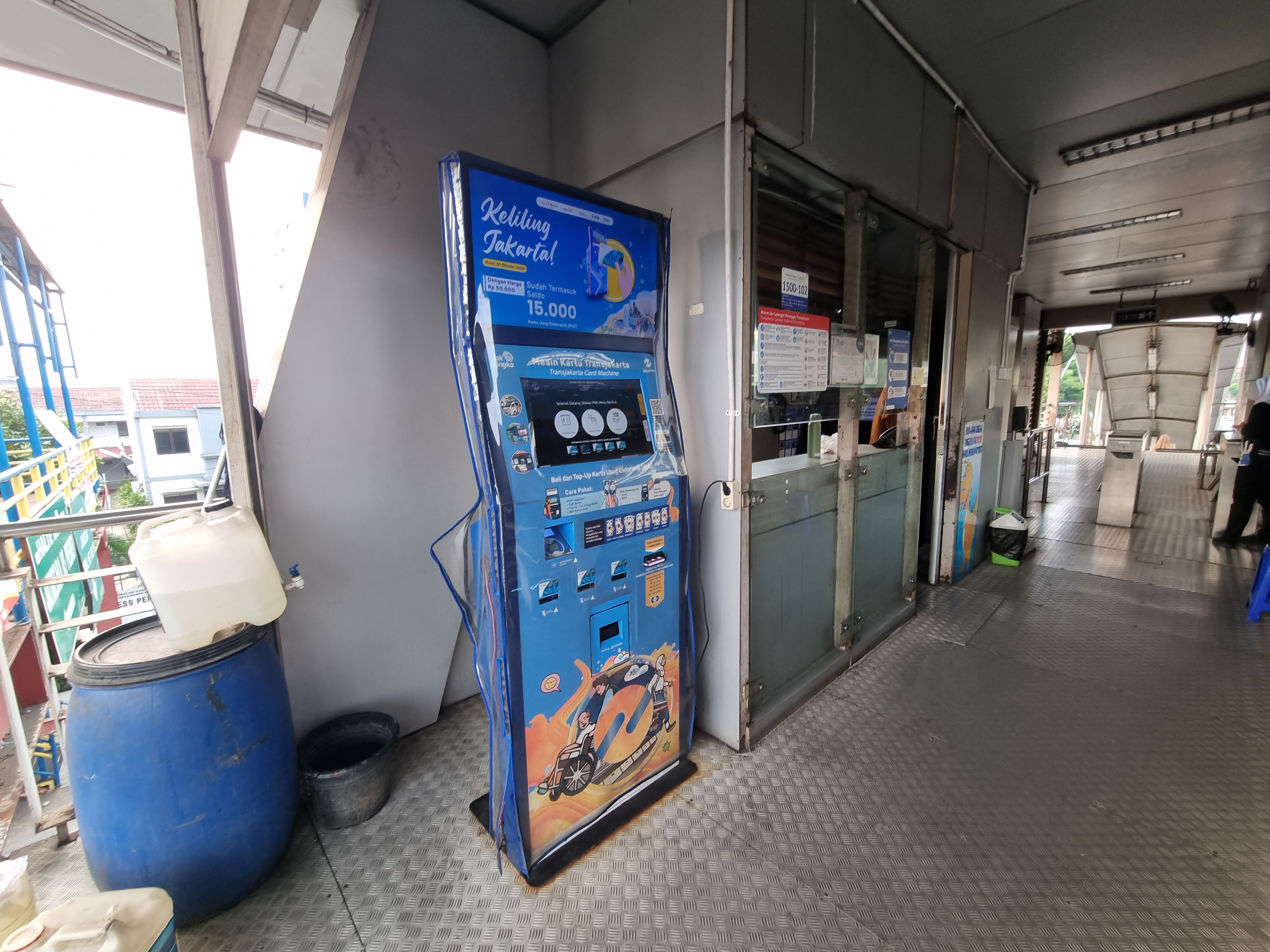
A typical ticket machine and gantry in the network

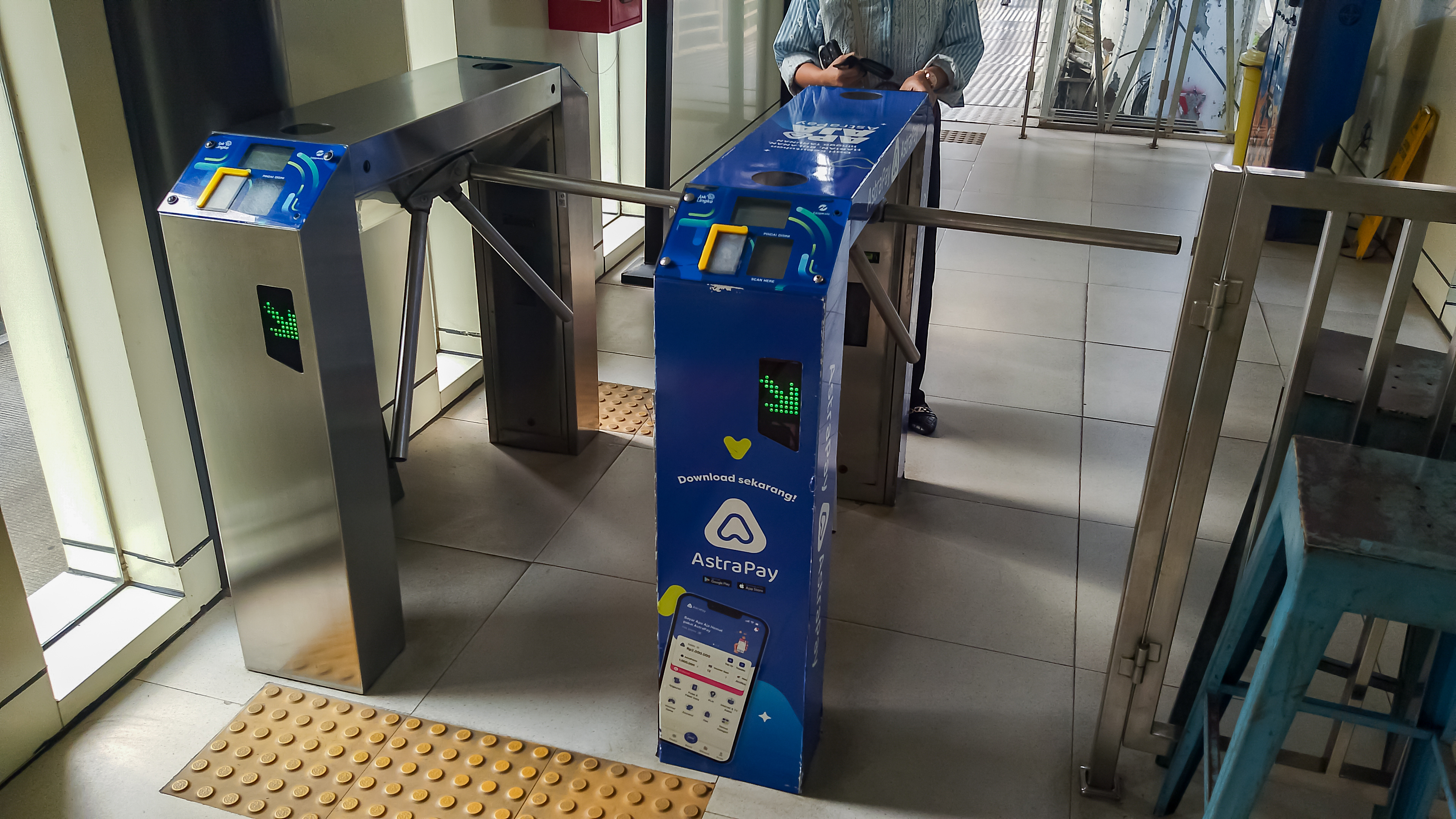
Transjakarta ticket barrier

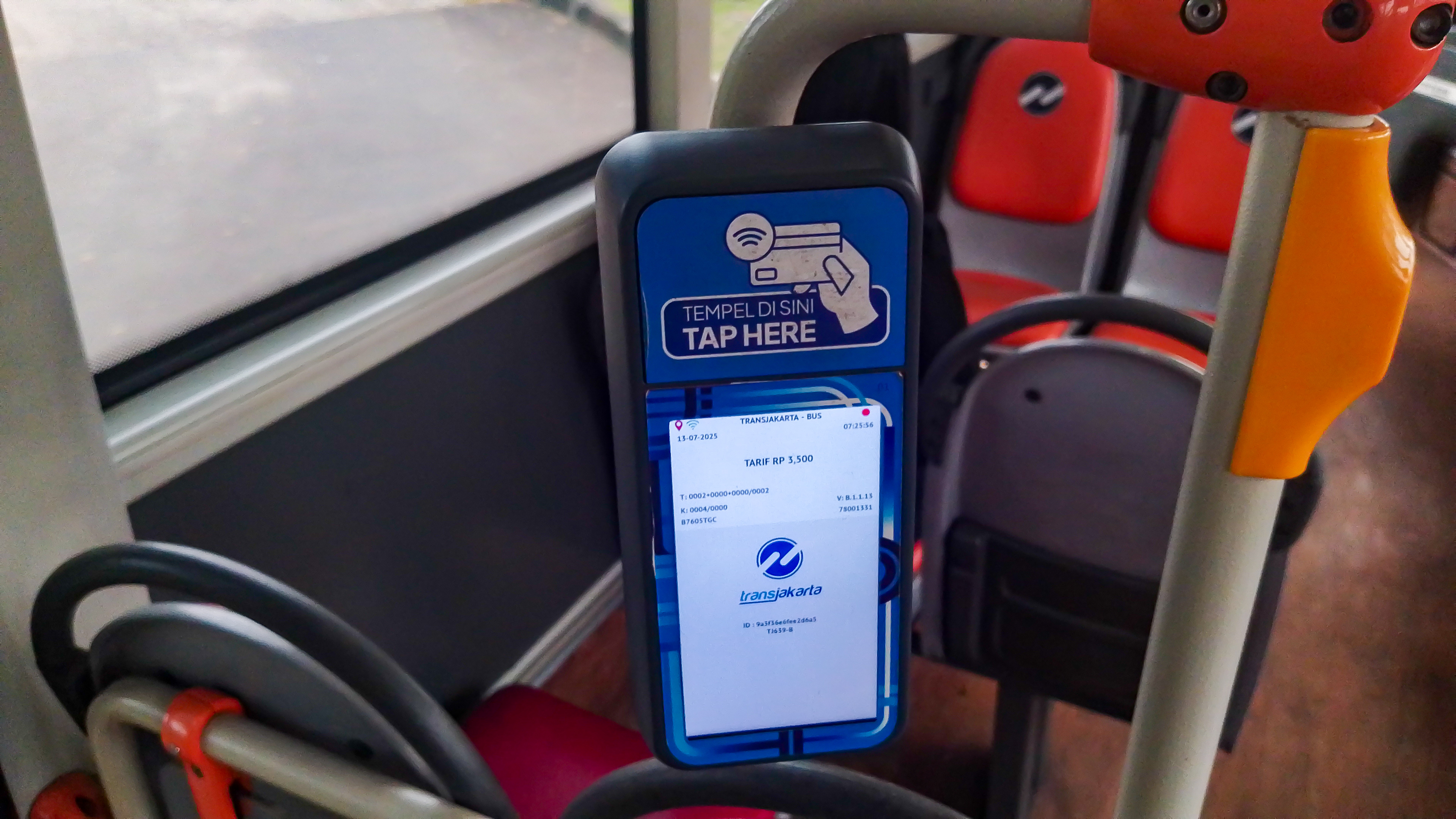
Transjakarta TOB machine

The cost of a Transjakarta ticket since its opening has been a flat rate of Rp 2.000,- at concessional times (05.00 a.m. to 07.00 a.m.) and Rp 3.500,- (about 24 US cents) each trip at all other times. The fare applies to all BRT and Non-BRT services, except Royaltrans, Mikrotrans, and city travel (Bus Wisata) services. Royaltrans costs Rp20.000,- each trip (or Rp35.000,- for some routes), while Mikrotrans and Bus Wisata are free to ride, although Mikrotrans still requires its passengers to tap in and out. One trip is considered a period from one tap-in to one tap-out.

Entering the station requires passengers to tap an electronic payment card (known as tap in), and they must do so again to exit the arrival station (tap out).

Passengers who wish to change direction or transit to other corridors do not need to pay again, provided they do not exit the paid area and complete the whole journey in one trip. Based on the definition of "one trip", this rule applies with some terms:

- Transfer must be done at the BRT station, either between two BRT routes, two partially integrated Non-BRT routes, or a pair of both, to be considered in one trip. Transfers that are done in bus stops or require exiting BRT station will require tapping out and paying again. All transfers to, from, or between fully disintegrated Non-BRT routes require paying again.
- For terminus shelters, the departure and arrival platforms must be connected in one paid area, thus passengers do not need to tap out and pay again and can continue their journey in one trip. Some terminus shelters, such as Kalideres, require tapping again to cross from arrival to departure platforms for passengers wishing to transfer.
- For stations that are made of a separate building with separate paid area for each direction (most of them in Corridor 9), transfers can only be done between the two routes stopping at the same building to be considered in one trip. This means changing direction or transferring to routes stopping at the opposite building requires exiting paid area and pay again to cross to the opposing building.
- For stations that are paired with another station by a skybridge located inside paid area, transfers between the two paired stations must be done by crossing the skybridge so that passengers do not exit the paid area and can continue their journey in one trip.

Up to 2015, passengers could purchase a single-journey paper ticket at the ticket booth in the shelter. In 2013, Transjakarta introduced the use of prepaid cards or e-tickets from BRI BRizzi, BCA Flazz, BNI Tapcash, Mandiri E-Money, Bank DKI JakCard, and Bank Mega MegaCash. The prepaid cards can be purchased and topped-up at any ticket booth in the shelter throughout the system, or the ATM of the issuing bank. The e-ticket is priced at Rp 40,000, Rp 20,000 for the card itself and a balance of Rp 20,000. The prepaid cards, except for Bank DKI JakCard and Bank Mega MegaCash, are also valid as a ticket in the Jabodetabek Commuter Train system as of June 2014, easing the integration plan between the BRT and the commuter train system. In April and May 2014, the Transjakarta management started compulsory use of e-tickets at several terminus in the system, based on news that the BCA Flazz Card could also be used in Jabodetabek Commuter Train. In mid-October 2014, 56% passengers have used e-tickets. Now, all Transjakarta corridors and shelters applied the compulsory use of the e-tickets, since 21 February 2015. 17 August 2016 marks the start of tap-out system trial in Corridor 1 (Blok M – Kota), while a similar trial was started on 9 September 2016 in Corridor 2. The system is meant to control the flow of people going in and out of the shelters, discourage illegal entrance to and exit from the shelters, and to encourage sales and usage of the "e-tickets". In October 2016, the system had been implemented in all corridors of Transjakarta.

Starting on 24 August 2015 students who have the Jakarta Smart Card (Kartu Jakarta Pintar, KJP) can use it as an e-ticket for a free bus ride. The TJ Card, introduced in January 2018, provides free fares for their holders and is available for seniors above 60, residents of the Thousand Islands Regency, disabled persons, low-income households, teachers, mosquito controllers and mosque caretakers in addition to members of the Indonesian National Armed Forces and the Police.

In the early days of non-BRT (Non-BRT) routes, passengers could pay cash to the bus conductor or use a prepaid card issued by a specific bank. This varied depending on the route (ex: Route 6H mainly accepted BCA Flazz cards only, Route 3E mainly accepted BNI Tapcash cards only), and was criticised for being highly unreliable. The card-reading device was sometimes unavailable, or different from the usual bank device issued in one route. This method of payment was gradually phased out in favor of the Tap-On-Bus (TOB) system. TOB acts similarly to the E-ticket payment system on shelters. It accepts payment from all prepaid bank-issued cards that are eligible on bus shelters. The only difference is that payment is done on board the Non-BRT bus instead of shelters. In 2019, all buses assigned to Route 1H, 1N, 1R, 4F, and 5F already has the TOB installed on it and make use of TOB for all payment.

As of 2024, all Non-BRT routes already use the TOB system for all buses. Passengers boarding Non-BRT buses require to tap in when boarding and tap out when alighting, both of which on the bus. For Non-BRT routes that are partially integrated into the BRT system, if the passenger boards from or alights at a BRT shelter, tap in (if boarding from BRT) or tap out (if alighting at BRT) is done at the BRT shelter, while the other tap is done on the bus, unless both boarding and alighting are done each at a BRT shelter. Passengers can easily transfer between BRT and integrated Non-BRT routes at a BRT shelter without tapping again. The most common criticism is the variance of fare-deducting mechanism due to some TOB machines deducting fare at tap in while others and all BRT shelters deduct fare at tap out, sometimes causing double-deducting error, which although has been mostly mitigated and now is very rare, still sometimes occurs.

On 13 October 2021, KAI Commuter starts trialling its Multi Trip Card as a payment card for MRT Jakarta, Transjakarta, and LRT Jakarta, as part of efforts integrating Jakarta's public transportation ticketing. However, the Multi Trip Card only works at a BRT shelter and cannot be used with TOB machines on Non-BRT buses.

Electronic wallets supporting QRIS can be used with the Jak Lingko ticket app to purchase QR tickets for scanning at Transjakarta BRT shelter gates. Starting on 14 March 2025, Transjakarta began accepting payments from electronic wallet providers participating in QRIS Tap NFC for Royaltrans premium bus services, with the system officially rolling out to other Transjakarta services and Greater Jakarta's other major transit systems on 30 October 2025.

== Bus tracking ==
In 2017, Transjakarta started allowing its buses to be tracked in Trafi app. Passengers could see the location of the bus in real time in the app, thus minimizing wait time and allowing them to know when the bus was going to arrive.

On 2 October 2020, Transjakarta launched Tije, an app that allowed passengers to buy tickets using QR codes. It was launched to reduce COVID-19 transmission by reducing interaction between passengers and ticket offices. The QR-based tickets, however, could only be used in BRT shelters for BRT buses and could only be paid for with AstraPay, which Transjakarta had a contract with. The app also allowed the users to see bus arrival times through live tracking similar to that in Trafi, although the function only worked in BRT shelters and only tracked BRT buses.

In July 2022, Trafi announced its decision to cease operation in Indonesia, thus the bus tracking feature went out of service. As a response, Transjakarta began trialling bus tracking feature in Moovit in February 2023, allowing passengers to track its buses in the app. However, the agreement was short lived, as Transjakarta terminated its contract in January 2024, leaving Tije app as the sole platform for its bus tracking. Tije app was highly criticized as many of its functions, including bus tracking, not working reliably with most of the buses not appearing even when the app was used in the BRT shelter.

In May 2024, Transjakarta began trialling bus tracking in Google Maps. This time, all of the buses, be it BRT, Non-BRT, or Mikrotrans buses were made trackable. The trial lasted for a month, before bus tracking feature went missing in June. On July 18th, Transjakarta launched a new app called TJ: Transjakarta, to replace the Tije app, which was going to be retired in August. The new app provides the live bus tracking feature of all BRT and Non-BRT buses, including Royaltrans, Mikrotrans, and Bus Wisata services, alongside all other same features as the outgoing Tije app, but with new design. Bus tracking feature also returned to and is available in Google Maps.

== Passengers and ridership ==
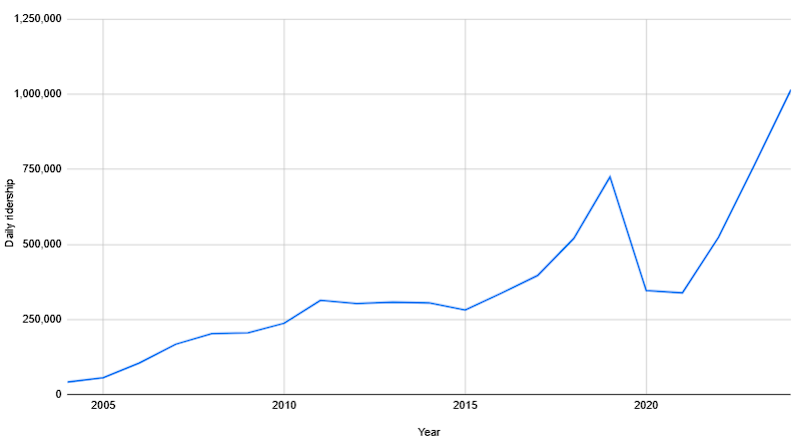
TransJakarta daily ridership, 2004–2024.

During rush hours, people from upper or middle classes (one of the main targets of Transjakarta) usually prefer to use private cars or taxis to avoid the inconvenience of the overcrowded Transjakarta buses even though they have to bear with traffic jams instead. Many passengers are thus lower-middle-class people who are ex-users of other less comfortable and/or more expensive commercial buses. This situation is at odds with one of the objectives of Transjakarta, which was to reduce traffic jam during rush hours by persuading private car owners to use comfortable public transport. There is a special program for the student groups called Transjakarta goes to school. Participants in the program are assigned a dedicated bus. The aim is to train students to stand in line, be decent, and prefer public transport than personal vehicles. The municipal government has been trying to encourage the population to shift from their private vehicles to public transportation, especially Transjakarta. Thus, several regulations are put in place to restrict private cars on the street. By August 2018, the odd–even traffic policy increases Transjakarta passengers by 30,000.

In its first year of operations, TransJakarta carried 14.9 million passengers (~42,000 daily passengers), with the number having increased to 114.7 million by 2011. Between 2011 and 2015, passenger numbers stagnated and even declined slightly, which was attributed to poor bus and service quality along with incursions of private vehicles into the bus lanes increasing travel times. In 2016, passenger numbers began to increase again following the introduction of new non-BRT routes and the replacement of old buses. By 2019, passenger numbers had over doubled from its 2016 numbers, due to the integration of angkot into MikroTrans and further increases in routes. The service served over 1 million riders in a day for the first time on 4 February 2020. After a brief collapse in passenger numbers due to the COVID-19 pandemic, ridership had recovered by mid-2023 and the service passed the 1 million ridership mark again on 13 June 2023. The annual average daily ridership in 2024 was just over 1 million.

== Issues and accidents ==
Several design and operational problems have been identified. Despite having an exclusive bus lane, unauthorised vehicles illegally using the lanes in an attempt to more quickly navigate through the traffic jams are commonplace. Depot maintenance shops and special gas stations (most buses use compressed natural gas (CNG)) often have long lines of buses, restricting the availability of buses for service. The CNG powered buses also have suffered from higher fuel consumption than expected (one litre for 1.3 km compared to 2.1 km as specified) and high oil and moisture content requiring extra maintenance. Other problems identified were: a lack of non-BRT bus services, a lack of adequate transfer information and transfer facilities and a lack of articulated buses. A 2010 survey showed 75% of passengers transferred from medium or micro-buses to the Transjakarta buses, and it was estimated if direct service operations were implemented (i.e., multiple stopping points at some stations with bypass lanes and some services continuing beyond the trunk corridors) patronage would increase by 50%. A non-BRT bus service called APTB was introduced in 2012. These non-BRT routes stops at pedestrian bus stops like regular intercity bus system. As of 2024, there are 57 non-BRT routes referred to officially as Non-BRT routes, some of which being partially integrated into the BRT system (stops at a limited number of BRT shelters) while others are fully disintegrated (stops at just pedestrian bus stops, some of which being located near the BRT shelters but still require to tap again to transfer).

In May 2013, it was reported that the system was losing passengers due to unpredictable service frequency, worsening travel times, and poor maintenance of the infrastructure and vehicles. The problem of excluding private vehicles from busways was still ongoing. By November 2013, after a campaign to "sterilise" the lanes improved travel times, reports indicate patronage had increased by 20,000 per day up to between 330,000 and 355,000.

From January to July 2010, there were 237 accidents involving Transjakarta buses, resulting in 57 injuries and eight deaths. Accidents occurred due to pedestrians crossing the busway and cars making U-turns. In 2011, in an effort to stop non-Transjakarta vehicles using the bus lanes, the Jakarta Police Chief suggested that Transjakarta buses should run against the direction of traffic flow. Usually, non-Transjakarta vehicles used the busway lanes during rush hours.

On 12 January 2012, a policeman from the Indonesian Police Headquarters, who was hired by Securicor, fired his gun near the ear of a Transjakarta officer after threatening to kill him. The policeman was angry after the Transjakarta officer stopped the Securicor car from entering the busway lane, which allows only Transjakarta buses, ambulances, and firefighters to enter. The police spokesman said that the policeman would be charged by criminal law or disciplinary sanction.

=== Hijacking ===
On 12 March 2012, four Transjakarta buses were hijacked by alleged university students at the Medan Merdeka Selatan street. The buses were driven to the front of the Universitas Kristen Indonesia (Christian University of Indonesia) campus. Three drivers were able to escape from their buses, but one driver was prevented from leaving and forced to drive the hijackers to their destination. Fire extinguishers, glass-breaking hammers and drivers' jackets were also stolen from the buses.

=== 2013 corruption case ===
In 2014, a corruption investigation began over series of accidents related to poor conditions of new vehicles through fraudulent procurement of more than one trillion IDR. The probe indicted Head of Jakarta Transport Department Udar Pristono as suspect of the corruption case. Pristono argued that he was only working under the supervision of then governor Joko Widodo on the procurement project, and accusing him liable for the legal prosecution as he had the responsibility over financial budget abuses involved in his administration.

=== Bombing ===
On 24 May 2017, a twin bomb attack struck the Kampung Melayu Transjakarta bus terminal. The first explosion happened at nine sharp, near the terminal's toilet, and the second explosion happened five minutes after at the bus stop. In total, five people were killed, including the two suspects.

=== Sexual harassment ===
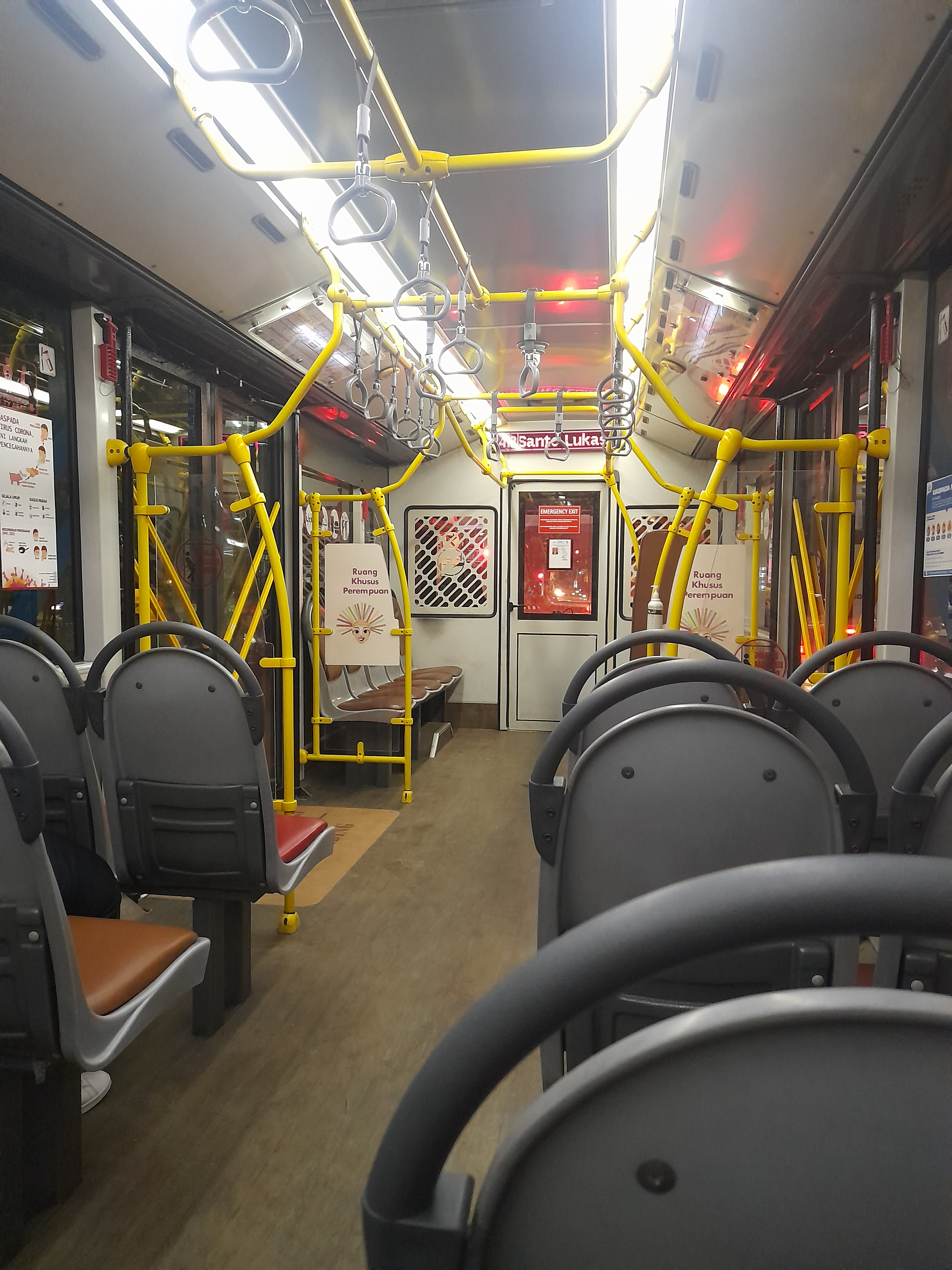
Interior of the bus, with women-only area in the front.

A number of sexual harassment cases have been reported on board crammed Transjakarta buses and their overcrowded stations over the past few years, as the number of passengers has continued to rise. Transjakarta responded by providing a women-only area at the front of its buses and launching women-only buses.

=== Burning incident ===
Demonstrations opposing a bill draft in October 2020 turned violent and multiple BRT shelters became targets. The stations of Bundaran HI and Sarinah were the first two shelters burned down, out of a total of 20 shelters that were either entirely or partially burned, looted, damaged and vandalised by rioters. Transjakarta claimed a loss of up to 55 billion Rupiah.

=== Rear-end collision ===
There has been cases where fellow Transjakarta buses collided in the Transjakarta lane. In 2016, Kopaja AC buses (under pilot integration program with Transjakarta) collided with Corridor 1 bus at Monas station triggering a chain collision and 2 fatal injuries. In October 2021, two buses serving Corridor 9 were involved in a similar accident, leaving 3 casualties.

In September 2025, TransJakarta experienced three accidents in a month. On Saturday, September 6, Transjakarta crashed into a shop on Minangkabau Raya Rd, Setiabudi, South Jakarta. The incident resulted in injuries to a shopkeeper. Afterward, on Thursday, September 18, a Transjakarta bus collided with a yellow truck in front of Tarakan Regional General Hospital (RSUD), Cideng Village, Gambir District, Central Jakarta. Then on Friday, September 19, a Transjakarta bus crashed into a kiosk, a house, and a vehicle belonging to a resident on Stasiun Cakung Rd, Pulogebang Village, Cakung District, East Jakarta. As a result of the incident, 6 people were injured, consisting of the bus driver, a resident, and 4 passengers.

== Transit Oriented Development ==
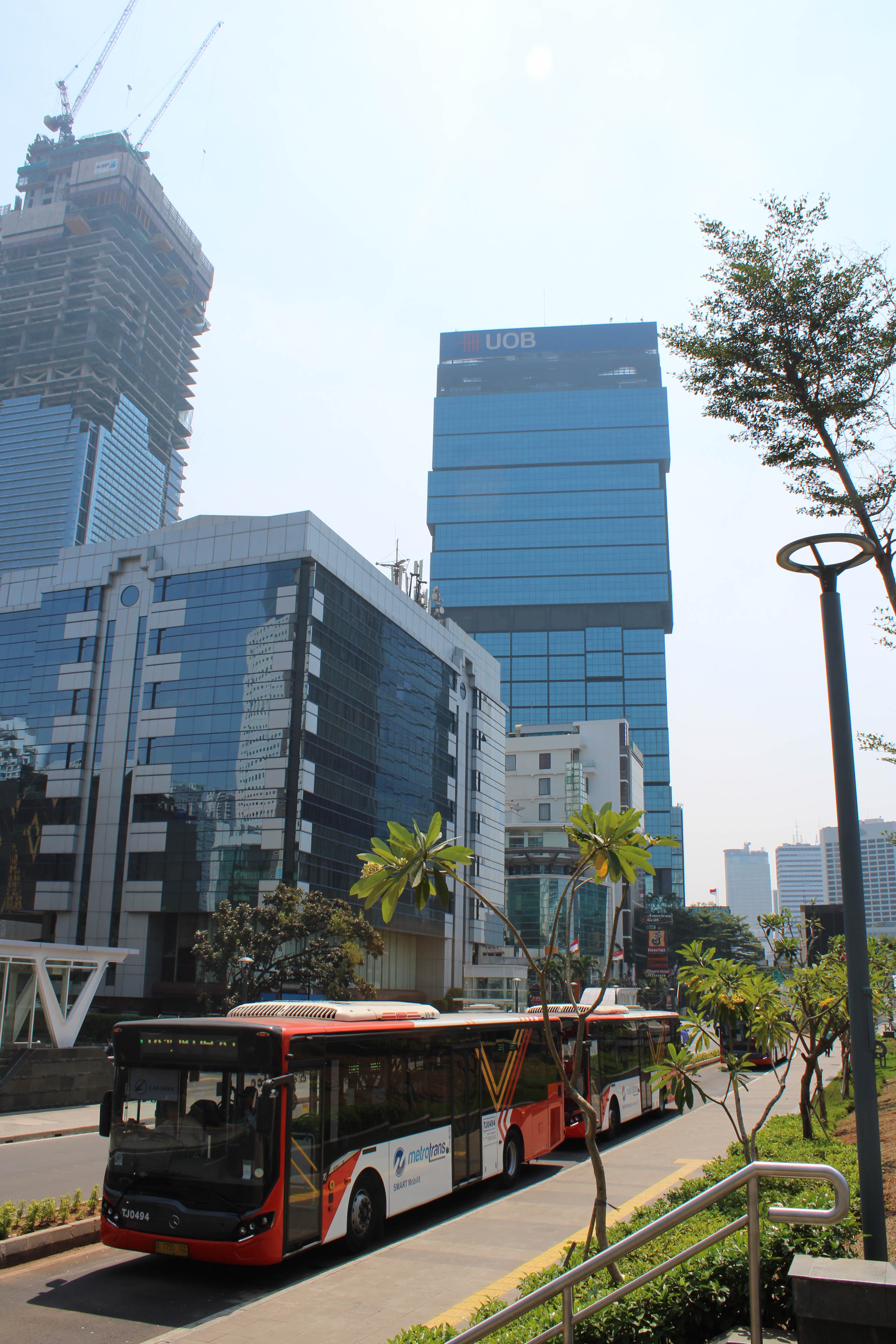
One of the largest Transit Oriented Development is the Dukuh Atas TOD. It connects Transjakarta with other public transport services, such as Metrotrans and Minitrans buses, the Commuter Line, the MRT, the Soekarno–Hatta Airport Rail Link, and the Jabodebek LRT

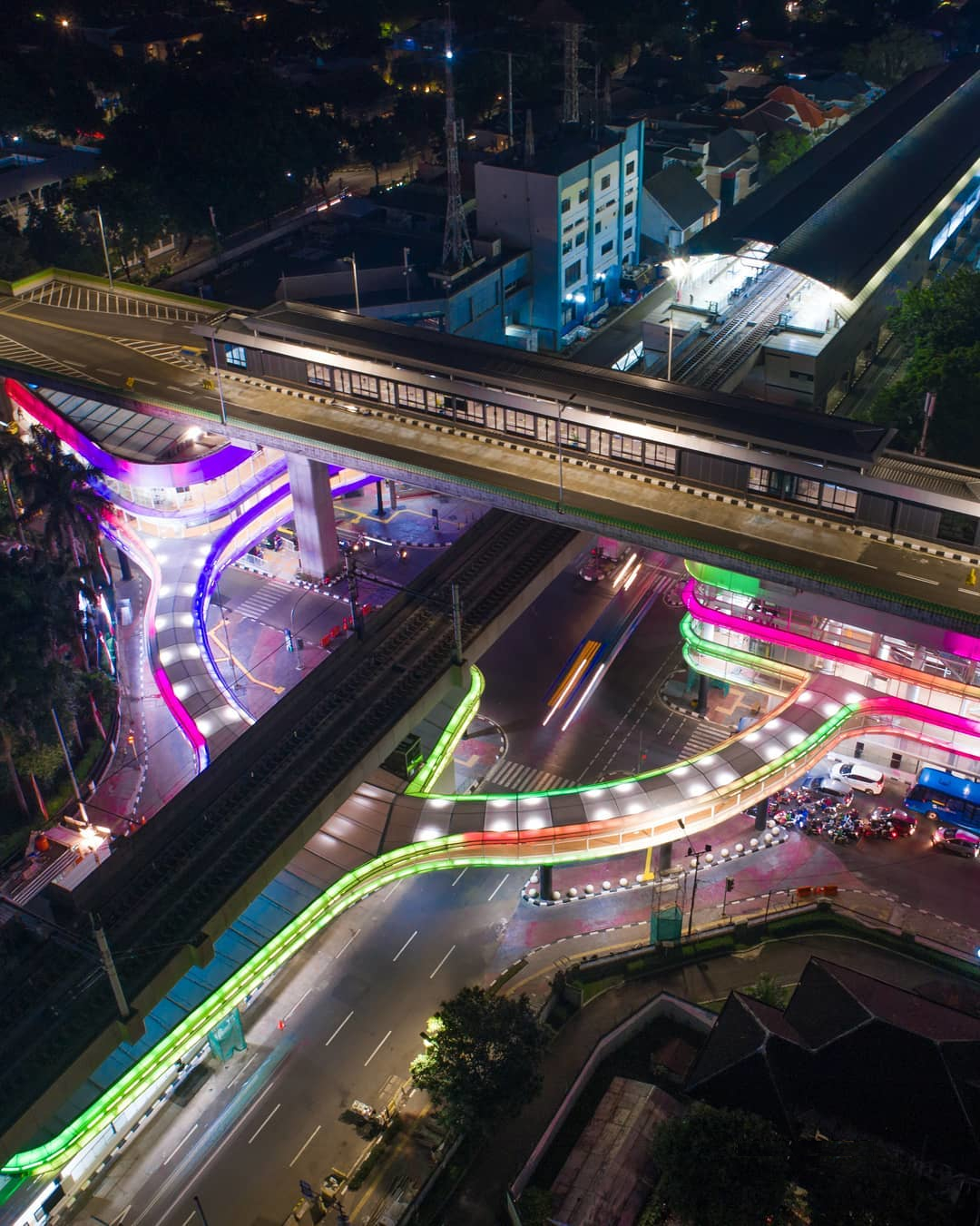
The CSW-ASEAN TOD connects Corridor 1 and 13 with the Jakarta MRT. Located in Kebayoran Baru, South Jakarta

Seventeen Transit Oriented Development (TOD) is being built to integrate of multiple transport systems to facilitate easy and convenient transit between various mode of public transportation. At Tebet, the TOD integrates Transjakarta and the Commuter Line. Meanwhile, at Dukuh Atas TOD (Indonesian: Kawasan Integrasi Dukuh Atas or KIDA), the aim is to prioritise walking and the use of public transport as a commuting solution, rather than using private vehicles. KIDA will integrate seven transport systems in total, which are the Jakarta MRT, Jabodebek LRT, Jakarta LRT, Soekarno-Hatta Airport Rail Link, Commuter Line, Transjakarta, Metrotrans, Minitrans, Mikrotrans and other bus services.

An integral part of Transjakarta's operations are the various non-BRT routes operated by Metrotrans, Minitrans, and Mikrotrans buses. As of September 2024, there are about 2,968 Mikrotrans micro-buses integrated with different routes of Transjakarta. The smaller buses and microbuses operated by both Minitrans and Mikrotrans are able to access narrower roads, allowing public transportation services to reach high-density residential areas. While the service still requires improvements in areas such as frequency and reliability, it represents an important step toward the improvement of Jakarta's public transportation system.

== Logos ==
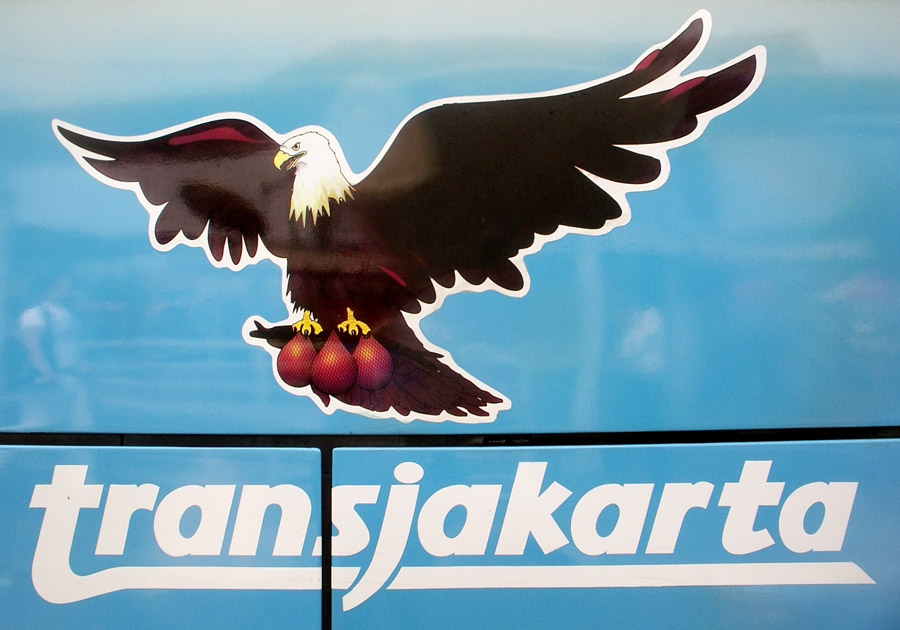
2004–2012

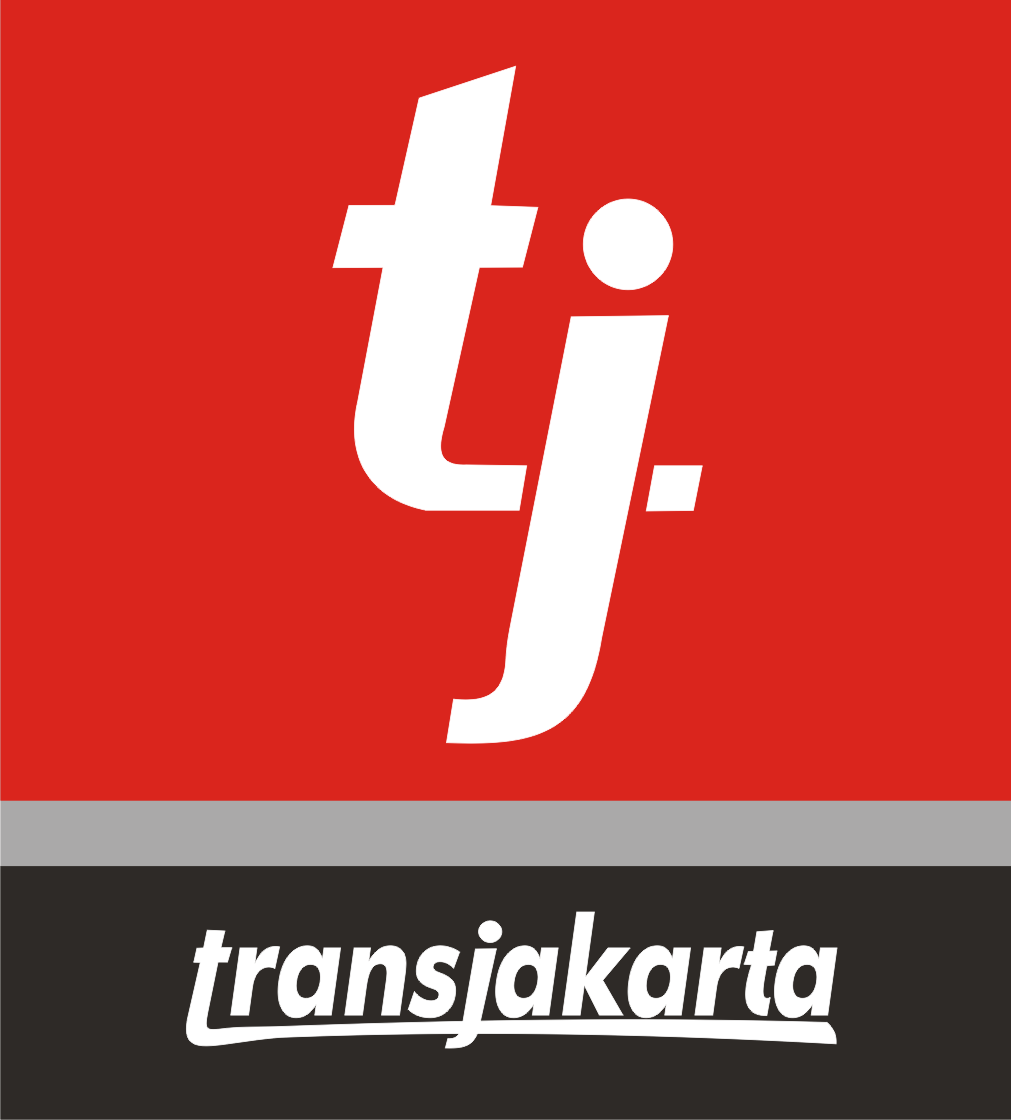
2012–2014

2014–present

== See also ==
- Greater Jakarta Integrated Mass Transit System
- Transport in Indonesia
- Transport in Jakarta
  - Jabodebek LRT
  - Jakarta MRT
  - Jakarta LRT
  - KRL Commuterline
- Metrotrans
- Minitrans
- TransMilenio
