= Afterlove EP =

2025 video game

- Cover featuring Rama and Cinta
- Developer: Pikselnesia
- Publisher: Fellow Traveller Games
- Directors: Mohammad Fahmi Hasni; Ivor D. Tomo
- Producers: Louis Li; Laure Bruyère
- Designer: Galuh Elsa Ayu Nurningsih
- Programmers: Giri Prahasta P. Fajri Rahmadhanny
- Artist: Dwinanda Edo
- Writers: Amy-Leigh Shaw; Pelo Tsavoussis; Louisa Atto
- Composer: Dhoni Awaludin
- Engine: Unity
- Platforms: Nintendo Switch; PlayStation 5; Windows; Xbox Series X/S
- Release: February 14, 2025
- Genre: Visual novel
- Mode: Single-player

Afterlove EP is a 2025 visual novel developed by Indonesian game studio Pikselnesia and published by Fellow Traveller Games. It was released on February 14, 2025, for Nintendo Switch, PlayStation 5, Windows and Xbox Series X/S. The game is set in Jakarta and follows the story of Rama, a young musician who has to create an extended play for his musical band within twenty-eight days, a year after grieving the death of his girlfriend Cinta.

== Gameplay ==
Afterlove EP is a side-scrolling visual novel described as a mix of dating sim, rhythm game, and adventure game genres. The player controls Rama, a young musician who is part of a musical band with Adit and Tasya. His girlfriend, Cinta, dies from a health emergency. A year later, Rama approaches his band mates to find out that he has to create an extended play within twenty-eight days for an upcoming band performance. Whether Rama successfully creates the extended play determines Rama's retention in the musical band. Rama also hallucinates Cinta's voice that interjects Rama's actions and conversations, which Rama tends to respond to during conversations.

The player can decide on what Rama can do in the time period. However, the player is limited in doing two actions per day - one in the morning and one in the evening. The player can interact with various people, travel across the game's map, or attend therapy. The player can also sprint or fast-forward dialogue. Rama can also choose dialog options.

The game also features a rhythm game section where the player taps and holds directional buttons that arrive from the left and right side. However, the player's performance in rhythm game sections do not affect dialogue among characters. The game features dating sim gameplay where Rama could develop relationships with three possible suitors that can affect the narrative.

== Plot ==
=== Synopsis ===
Rama, a young musician has the ambition to start indie band. In a vibrant city of Jakarta, Rama and his friends open a gig in a cafe, many of them look forward to the event. Cinta, who is Rama's girlfriend attended the gig even though her condition is unwell. The gig went successful, and Rama is invited to celebrate the gig in a bar. Unbeknownst to Rama, the celebration went harrow after Cinta passed away in the same day.

The death of Cinta takes a toll on Rama and makes him struggle to move on with life. Whilst his close friends and bandmates are all determined to help him move on, Rama has been stuck for more than a year. He is neglecting his music, his mental health, and his relationships.

== Development and release ==
Afterlove EP was developed by Indonesian indie game studio Pikselnesia and published by Fellow Traveller Games. The game was first announced as Project Heartbreak by game director Mohammad Fahmi, director of Coffee Talk and What Comes After in April 2021. The game was then announced again as Afterlove EP in December 2021 for release in 2022. However, during the development of the game, creative director Mohammad Fahmi died in March 2022. Pixelnesia, the team assembled by Fahmi for Afterlove EP, stopped work on the game for two months. Development resumed after narrative designer Galuh Elsa (also known as Sasha Ariana), a writer on previous games What Comes After and A Space for the Unbound, took over the lead development role. Pikselnesia and Fellow Traveler Games announced the game to be released in the Q3 period of 2024, then was moved to February 14, 2025.

The game was already two years in development, so Pixelnesia relied on an outline given by Fahmi for the game's direction and main characters. Most of the dialogue and scenes were written after Fahmi's death. Afterlove EP was influenced by visual novels and dating simulators. The rhythm game sections, which were added to reflect Rama as a musician, were considered as mini-games. Development of the game took four years with two years for development planning.

According to game producer Ivor Dwitomo, Fahmi wanted to create the game to "show a slice of life of what it is like to be young and living in the places that he himself grew up and lived in." As such, the game is set in Jakarta, the capital of Indonesia. The game features places in South Jakarta, which the developers focused on, such as Blok M and Ayodya Park. The game also portrays aspects of Indonesian culture such as the warung and ondel-ondel. Pikselnesia also collaborated with Jakarta-based indie music band L'alphalpha, which produced seven songs for the game, with four of the tracks made after Fahmi's death.

== Reception ==
Reception

Aggregate scores
Aggregator	Score
Metacritic	(NS) 78/100 (PC) 74/100 (PS5) 70/100
OpenCritic	68% recommend

Review scores
Publication	Score
Adventure Gamers	4.5/5
Nintendo Life	7/10
Nintendo World Report	9/10
Push Square	7/10
RPGFan	74/100
Shacknews	9/10

Afterlove EP received "generally positive" reviews for the Nintendo Switch version, while the PC and PlayStation 5 versions received "mixed or average" reviews, according to review aggregator website Metacritic. Fellow review aggregator OpenCritic assessed that the game received strong approval, being recommended by 68% of critics.

Nintendo Life's Michelle See-Tho noted the "jarring juxtaposition" of mundanity and heavy themes such as trauma, which was also a "successful strangeness".

Nintendo World Report's Alex Ororna commended the writing of the therapy sessions which he perceived as authentic for medical professionals.

Push Square's Graham Banas criticized the rhythm gameplay for the imprecision of hitboxes, but downplayed their criticism as rhythm game sections were not frequent in the game. They also noted that "writing is great, dealing with heavy themes respectfully, even if the nuance and subtly waver on occasion" and classified the music as shoegaze, emo, and post-rock.

Rock Paper Shotgun's Edwin Evans-Thirwell called the game's visual art style as hand-drawn and its music as gentle indie rock music.
