= Divine worship =

Divine worship or Divine Worship may refer to:

- Worship of God or gods
  - Christian worship in particular
- Liturgy, customary public worship performed by a religious group
  - Christian liturgy in particular
    - Anglican Use, rite of formerly Anglican, personal ordinariate parishes in the Catholic Church
      - Book of Divine Worship, former missal for the personal ordinariates
      - Divine Worship: The Missal, standard missal for the personal ordinariates
      - Divine Worship: Daily Office, Divine Office for the personal ordinariates
- Congregation for Divine Worship and the Discipline of the Sacraments, dicastery of the Roman Curia

== See also ==
- Divine Office (disambiguation)
- Divine Service (disambiguation)
