= Divine Office =

Divine Office may refer to:

- Liturgy of the Hours, the recitation of certain Christian prayers at fixed hours according to the discipline of the Roman Catholic Church
- Canonical hours, the recitation of such prayers in Christianity more generally
- Worship services, such as Matins and Vespers

== See also ==
- Divine Service (disambiguation)
- Divine Worship (disambiguation)
