= Kebayoran Baru =

District in South Jakarta, Indonesia

- District
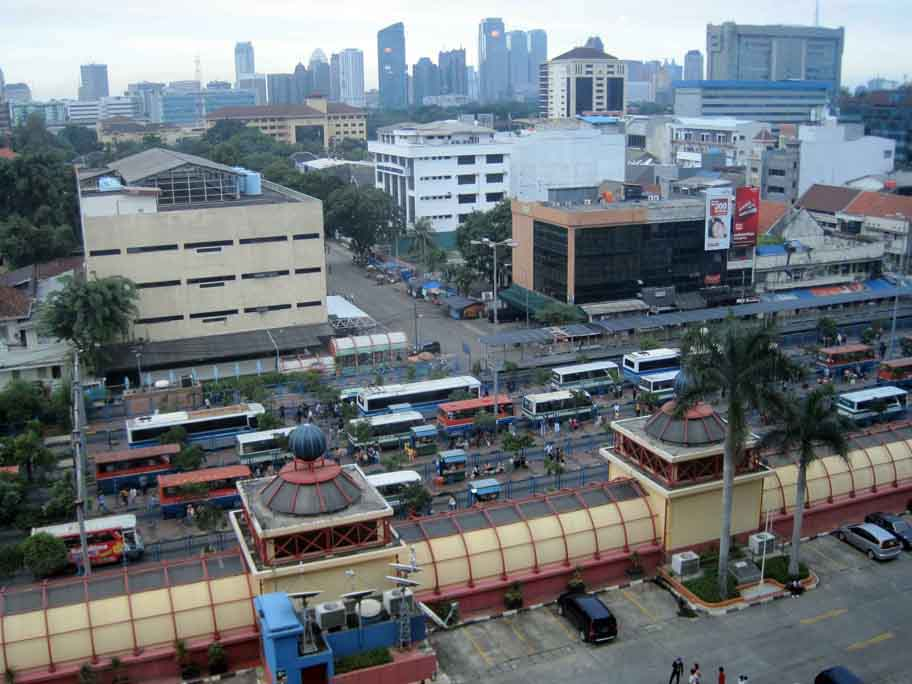
- Blok M shopping center and terminal, with the Sudirman Central Business District in the background, are located in the District of Kebayoran Baru, South Jakarta.
- Interactive map of Kebayoran Baru
- Country: Indonesia
- Province: Jakarta
- Administrative city: South Jakarta
- Postal code: 121XX

Kebayoran Baru is a district (Indonesian: kecamatan) in the administrative city of South Jakarta, Indonesia. The name was derived from a planned satellite city of the same name which was developed in the post-war period. Kebayoran Baru was the last residential area to be developed by the Dutch colonial administration. The urban planning was laid in a concept of the Garden city movement, consisting of a well-planned residential area, a shopping center, and a business district, supported with civic facilities such as schools, places of worship, hospitals, and parks. Today, the district is home to many important government institutions, such as the Indonesia Stock Exchange building, the ASEAN Headquarters building, the National Police headquarters, and the City Hall of South Jakarta. Sudirman Central Business District is also located in the district.

== Toponym ==
The literal meaning of Kebayoran Baru is "New Kebayoran". The word kebayoran itself is derived from kabayuran, meaning "stockpiles of bayur wood (Pterospermum javanicum)". Kabayuran or Kebayuran refers to the name of a settlement Kampung Kabayuran (older Dutch spelling Kamp. Kabajoeran), located outside Batavia on the west bank of Grogol River. The settlement was located near an area where stockpiles of timber (including bayur wood) were established to be transported to Batavia via the river. Bayur wood is known for its strength and resistance to termite attack. The Kampung Kabayuran settlement thrived in the early 19th-century but has since been urbanized. This settlement was located roughly on what is now the Kebayoran Railway Station.

== Government ==
As a district, the area of Kebayoran Baru is larger than the historic Kebayoran Baru satellite city, including the southern area of Kebayoran Baru and the Sudirman Central Business District to the northeast. The rough boundaries of Kebayoran Baru district are Sudirman Avenue to the northwest, Gatot Subroto Road to the northeast, Krukut River to the east, Cipete Utara Road - Haji Nawi Road to the south, and Grogol River to the west.

The district of Kebayoran Baru is divided into ten kelurahan or subdistricts:

Subdistrict	Area code
Selong	12110
Gunung	12120
Kramat Pela	12130
Gandaria Utara	12140
Cipete Utara	12150
Pulo	12160
Melawai	12160
Petogogan	12170
Rawa Barat	12180
Senayan	12190

== History ==
This subsection focuses on the area of Kebayoran Baru that was once the Kebayoran Baru satellite city.

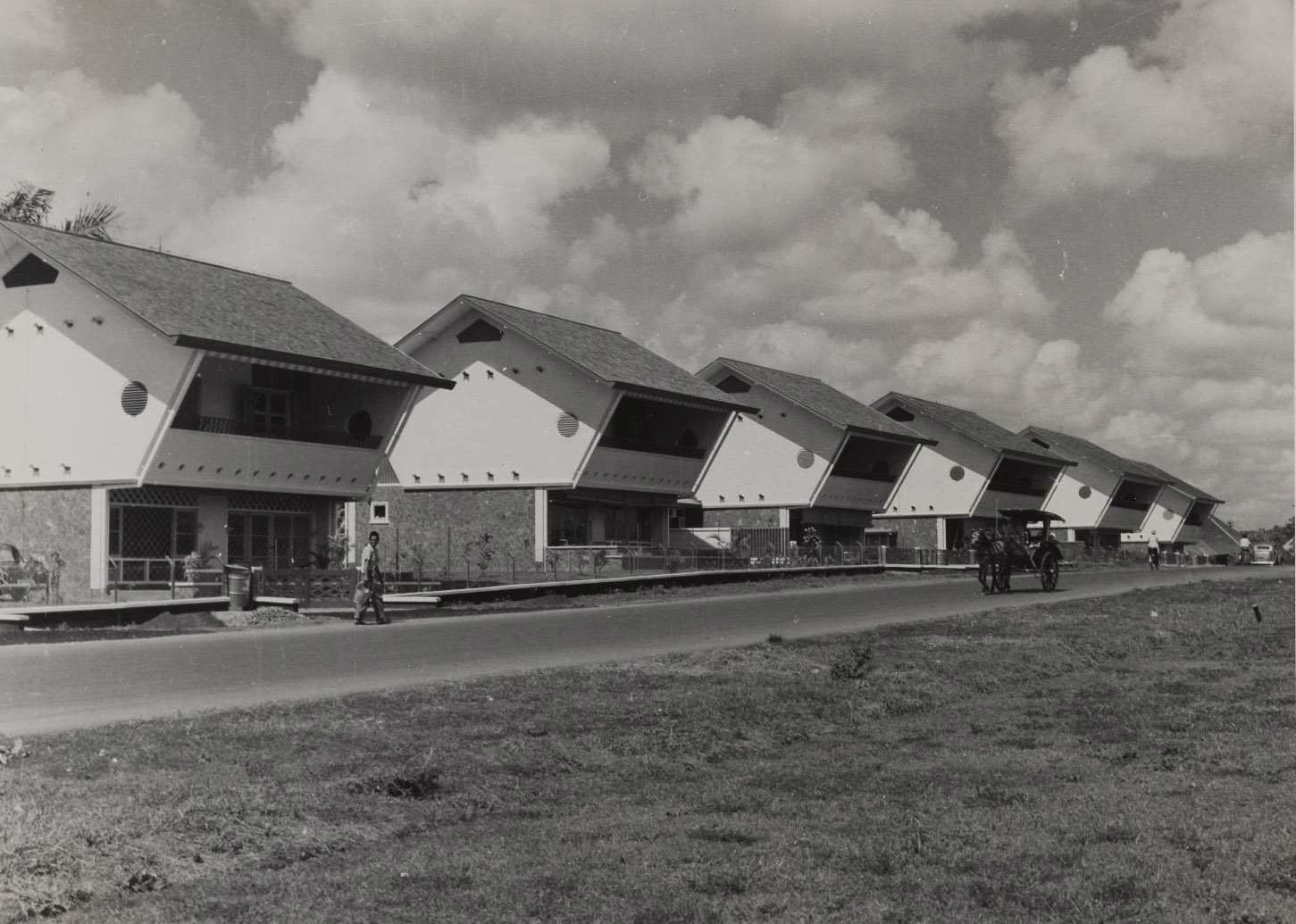
Post-war houses in Kebayoran built for Dutch East Indian Shell employees

The development of Kebayoran Baru satellite town was very quick. The 730 ha land in Kebayoran was initially planned as a new airport, established to replace Kemayoran Airport (1940) whose location blocked the development of Batavia eastward. This plan was replaced with a plan for a satellite town for Batavia, the Kebajoran. The first idea for the satellite town was started in July 1948 and was immediately approved in September 1948. The new satellite town is located relatively close to Tanah Abang - Serpong railway line, enabling the transport of building construction material to the Kebajoran.

Following the approval of the plan, the colonial government began the land acquisition process for Kebayoran satellite town. On January 17, 1949, the land acquisition process for Kebayoran was completed. In February 1949, the first draft of the town's master plan was completed by Moh. Soesilo. Construction of the master plan followed immediately in March 1949, just a month later. Moh. Soesilo was an urban planner in the Centraal Planologisch Bureau and a student of Thomas Karsten, a renowned Dutch engineer who contributed to the urban planning and the development of architecture in colonial Indonesia. Soesilo designed the master plan for Kebayoran Baru and Pejompongan in 1948; these are the first urban center in the country to be designed by a native Indonesian.

The first laying of the stone was done on March 18, 1949. The first area to be designed is now located around Kebayoran station, on the east side of Grogol River. The construction was done by a specially-established Central Foundation for Reconstruction (Dutch: Centrale Stichting Wederopbouw, CSW), whose office was established near the current Attorney General building (Kejaksaan Agung) on June 1, 1948. The development of Kebayoran Baru satellite town was completed in 1955. The satellite town was connected to the center of Jakarta via Thamrin and Sudirman, both constructions started in 1949 and was finally opened in 1953. Before the completion of these roads, car access to Kebayoran Baru was via Jalan Palmerah Utara and Jalan Palmerah Selatan (now Jalan Asia Afrika).

=== Urban planning ===
Kebayoran Baru is designed following the principle of a garden city. Kebayoran Baru is a well-planned district, both in term of its urban planning and its infrastructure. Sudirman Avenue is the main road, which connects Kebayoran Baru to the city center in Central Jakarta. The southern quarter of the Semanggi Interchange is located in Kebayoran Baru.

The total planning area is 730 ha, with about 45% was allocated for the residential area, 16% for green space, and 14% for shops and other buildings. The remaining 25% of Kebayoran Baru area was allocated for roads.

==== City blocks of Kebayoran Baru ====
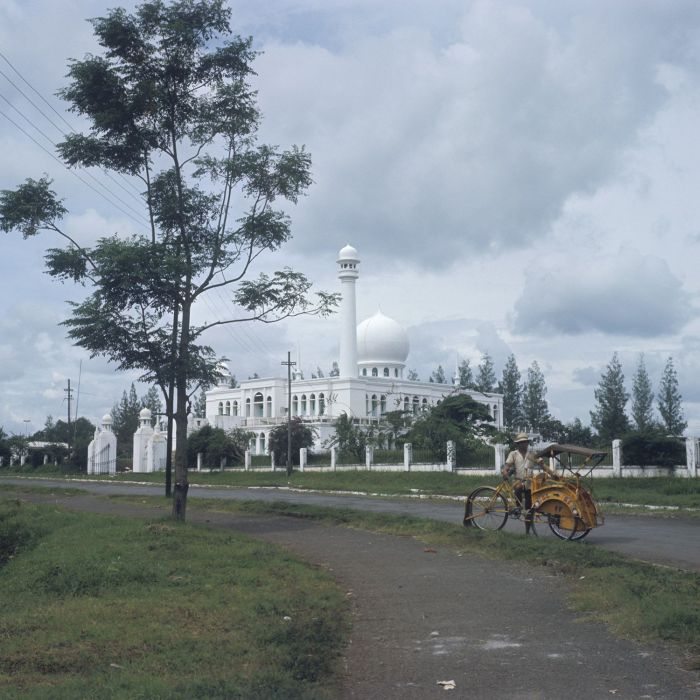
The Al-Azhar Great Mosque was the landmark of Blok K, which originally consisted of a Central Park (Taman Pusat), a grand open space for public use. In the 1970s, Kebayoran Baru's Central Park ceased to exist with the construction of government office buildings in the 1970s.

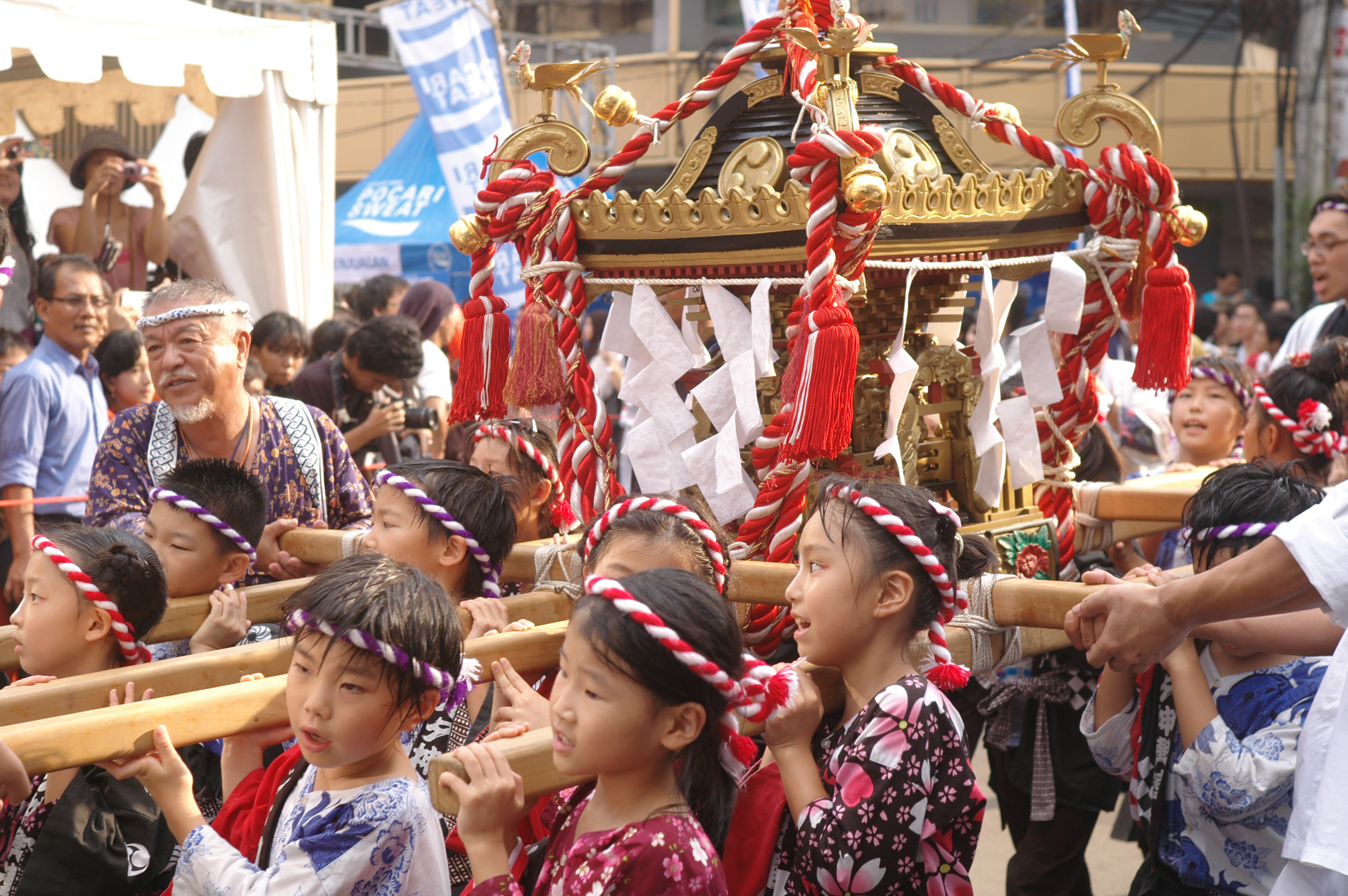
The Japanese cultural festival Ennichisai is held yearly in Blok M, the commercial center of Kebayoran Baru.

Kebayoran Baru is divided into several blocks (Indonesian blok) from A to S. Today the block names of Kebayoran Baru has been largely forgotten, however some of the names linger in the name of the public facility within the urban block. Below is the list of Kebayoran Baru blocks and its landmarks.

- Blok A is roughly bounded by Jalan Panglima Polim Raya to the east, Jalan Petogogan to the west, Jalan Ketimun I to the south and Jalan Kramat Pela to the north. Blok A is the southwesternmost city block of Kebayoran Baru. The block is designed as a residential area served with the Blok A market to the south end of the block. Blok A is now the western part of Pulo Administrative Village.
- Blok B is located north of Blok A. It is the area bounded by Jalan Kramat Pela-Jalan Gandaria I to the south, Jalan Gandaria Tengah III - Jalan Melawai to the north, and Jalan Panglima Polim Raya to the east. The area was designed as a residential area west of Jalan Panglima Polim Raya. Several education facilities e.g. Tarakanita 1 Catholic school, and The old cemetery Kuburan Wakaf Sebrang is located in Blok B. Blok B is now part of Kramat Pela Administrative Village.
- Blok C is located northeast of Blok B. The block is bounded by Jalan Kyai Maja to the north, Jalan Barito II to the west, Jalan Melawai to the south, and Jalan Panglima Polim Raya to the east. The area was designed as a residential area west of Jalan Panglima Polim Raya. The houses along Jalan Barito II were among the first to be constructed in the city block, roughly in 1949 (although very little of the original houses survived), and development of the rest of the block was completed in 1950. Blok C contains several post-war landmarks such as the office complex of the Attorney General (Kejaksaan Agung). Other original landmark of Blok C was the St. John the Evangelist Catholic Church near Bendera Pusaka Park. Blok C is now part of Kramat Pela Administrative Village.
- Blok D is located west of Blok C. The block is bounded by Jalan Kyai Maja to the north, Jalan Gandaria I to the west, Jalan Gandaria Tengah III to the south, and Jalan Barito II to the east. Most of the area of Blok D has been developed in 1949, making it among the oldest city block of Kebayoran Baru. Blok D was designed as a residential area with large green spaces such as the green belt park Taman Barito and Taman Puring. Blok D is part of Kramat Pela Administrative Village.
- Blok E is located north of Blok D. The block is bounded by Jalan Pakubuwono VI to the north, Jalan Lauser to the east, and Jalan Kyai Maja to the south. Blok E is the westernmost city block of the Kebayoran. Developed in 1949, it is the first block of Kebayoran Baru to be fully developed. The original design of Blok E was mostly allocated for residential area, especially free-standing villas. Among the original landmarks of Blok E were the Majestic Theatre in Nieuwe Bouwen style (demolished, now the BNI office) and the shops of the market area (now called Pasar Mayestik, after the old theatre). The post-war Jengki houses of Blok E along Jalan Pakubuwono are among the most well-preserved post-war architecture in Indonesia. Today some houses in Blok E have been commercialized, especially those along Jalan Pakubuwono. Blok E is currently part of Gunung Administrative Village.
- Blok F, to the east of Blok E, is bounded by Jalan Lauser to the west, Jalan Pakubuwono VI to the north, Jalan Sisingamangaraja to the east, and Jalan Kyai Maja to the south. The area was designed as a denser residential area to the west of Jalan Sisingamangaraja. Public hospital Pertamina and sport complex Bulungan is located in Blok F. The area is now part of Gunung Administrative Village.
- Blok G is located northwest of Blok F. The relatively isolated block consists of residential area north of Jalan Pakubuwono, e.g. Jalan Martimbang and Jalan Ophir. Initially designed as a peripheral residential area surrounded by the green riparian zone of Grogol River's, during the course of time, the riparian zone trees of River Grogol has been occupied by new housings caused by lack of governmental control. Blok G is currently part of Gunung Administrative Village.
- Blok H marks the western part of the northern entrance to Kebayoran Baru residential area. The boundary of the city block is Jalan Hang Lekir to the west, Jalan Pakubuwono VI to the south, Jalan Sisingamangaraja to the east, and Jalan Hang Lekir 1 to the north. It is roughly located southwest of Patung Pemuda.
- Blok I is located east of Blok H. The block marks the eastern part of the northern entrance to Kebayoran Baru, southeast of the Patung Pemuda. Blok I contains several well-preserved post-war modernist architecture e.g. the flat of Bank Indonesia in Block J. Blok I is now part of Selong Administrative Village.
- Blok K was designed as the administrative center of Kebayoran area. It was allocated for public facilities and institutions - such as the Great Mosque (now Al-Azhar Great Mosque), the Banknote Factory (now Perum Peruri), and the ASEAN Secretariat Office - surrounding a Central Park (Taman Pusat). This Central Park was maintained as a park only until the late 1970s, when it is converted into government facilities e.g. the high-rise complex of the Ministry of Public Works and Public Housing. Blok K is bounded by Jalan Sisingamangaraja to the west, Jalan Pattimura to the east, and Jalan Trunojoyo to the south. It is now part of Selong Administrative Village.
- Blok L is marked by Jalan Sultan Hasanuddin - Jalan Iskandarsyah Raya to the southwest, Jalan Tirtayasa to the southeast, Jalan Gunawarman to the east, Jalan Kertanegara to the north, and Jalan Pattimura to the west. The urban block was designed largely as a residential area. Among the first buildings of Blok L is the Badan Pendidikan dan Pelatihan Keuangan Kementerian Keuangan
- Blok M area is marked by Jalan Melawai X to the north, Jalan Iskandarsyah Raya to the east, Jalan Melawai to the south, and Jalan Panglima Polim Raya to the west. The block was exclusively designed for middle-sized commercial area with government-owned Pasar Pusat (Central Market) at the center. The area is served with a bus terminal. Blok M is probably the best known blocks of Kebayoran Baru, the name has been used for names of shopping centers around the area e.g. Blok M Plaza and Blok M Hub. Today Blok M remains the commercial center of Kebayoran Baru, and is known for its food festival and Japanese culture. Blok M is currently located in Melawai Administrative Village.
- Blok N is located south of Blok M. Blok N was a residential block bounded by Jalan Panglima Polim Raya to the west, Jalan Wijaya II to the south, Jalan Wijaya IX to the east, and Jalan Melawai to the north. The block was initially designed as residential area for middle-sized housing, single-floored villas, and double-floored villas. Today, some of the middle-sized houses has been converted into shops. Blok N is currently located in Melawai Administrative Village.
- Blok O is located east of Blok N. Blok O is marked by Jalan Wijaya IX to the west, Jalan Melawai - Jalan Tirtayasa to the north, and Jalan Wijaya I and Jalan Wijaya II to the south. The area was designed as residential area, the north part of Blok O was allocated for the police academy. Today, Blok O is located in Melawai Administrative Village.
- Blok P is located southeast of Kebayoran Baru. Blok P area is the first city block of Kebayoran Baru if entered through Kemang. Blok P was initially designed as residential area surrounded by green belt parks and the riparian zone of Krukut River. Blok P was also initially allocated for a police dormitory complex, storage area, and a large Muslim cemetery. Today the police dormitory has been converted into the Wijaya commercial center and Dharmawangsa Square, the area for storage has been converted into houses, while the Muslim cemetery was removed and transformed into the Municipal Office of South Jakarta. Blok P is currently located in Pulo Administrative Village.
- Blok Q is marked by Jalan Kertanegara to the north, Jalan Gunawarman - Prof. Joko Sutono SH to the west, Jalan Wijaya I to the south, and Jalan Suryo to the east. Jalan Wolter Monginsidi is aligned east–west in the middle of Blok Q, dividing the area into two half north and south. Similar with Blok A, the original land use of Blok Q contained an area allocated for public housing (perumahan rakyat). Today, some houses, especially those located in Jalan Wolter Monginsidi, has been converted into commercial area. Blok Q is now part of Petogogan Administrative Village.
- Triangular shaped Blok R is marked by Jalan Senopati to the north, Jalan Gunawarman to the west, and Jalan Kertanegara to the south. It was originally allocated for middle-sized housings. Today, some houses, especially those along Jalan Senopati, has been commercialized. Blok R is currently part of Rawa Barat Administrative Village.
- Blok S is the easternmost city block of Kebayoran Baru. Blok S is marked by Blok S soccer field. The boundary of Blok S are the Krukut to the east, Jalan Wolter Monginsidi to the south, and Jalan Suryo to the west. The area of Jalan Kebalen was originally allocated for public housing (perumahan rakyat). During the course of years, the riverbank of River Krukut in Blok S area was occupied by settlements, reducing the width of the river Krukut which causing annual flooding problems in Jakarta. In 2015, the government of Jakarta demolished some of the illegal riverbank settlements of River Krukut in Blok S in an attempt to widen the river. Blok S is currently part of Rawa Barat Administrative Village.

==== The Masterplan of Kebayoran Baru: between Vision and Implementation ====
Despite the lavish urban planning and design that involved the state government and the former Dutch East Indies colony, there are some inevitable concerns about the deviation from the initial master plan. Many scholars hold the view that Kebayoran Baru may not develop into the town its planners and architects envisioned. More recent arguments regarding this matter have been specified by Colombijn & Kusno (2017): According to widely held view at the time, a satellietstad (satellite town) was to be built at least 15 kilometres from the city centre to be a feasible new town; however, in practice, the length between the city centre and the newly built satellite town was only eight kilometres long, and the new connecting highway was immediately filled with ribbon developments on both edges, hence losing its standing as a satellite city.

Another criticism that depicts the difficulties of putting planning into practice was made by Roosmalen (2003). She explained that one of the principal regulations defining and ensuring the new town's autonomy and self-sufficiency proved difficult to follow. The construction of any structure along the connecting highway between Batavia (City Centre) and Kebayoran Baru is prohibited. From both an intellectual and a pragmatic standpoint, breaking restrictions like this jeopardised the plan's initial layout. Furthermore, according to Handinoto (1954), after Kebayoran Baru was finally completed in 1945, it did not achieve the intended goals. Only 4,720 homes were constructed out of a total of 7,050; and public facilities such as local markets, schools, mosques, and a church also didn't meet the intended outcome, with only 162 built out of the expected 352 public amenities.

On the other hand, despite these several pieces of evidence about the deviation from its planning vision, Kebayoran Baru also contributed positively to the future of planning theories and practices in Indonesia. A notable example of these positive outcomes is the fact that this new town has a considerable density compared to most post-World War II new cities across the United Kingdom. According to Silver (2008), Kebayoran Baru was expected to have a capacity of about 50,000 and 100,000 residents, in comparison with the UK which only projected for 25000 inhabitants. Even more, the core area's density in Kebayoran Baru was relatively close to 500,000 residents when completed. Additionally, the plan for this satellite city also has significant contributions to research in urban planning and future development of new towns in Indonesia generally and in Jakarta specifically. Sumintardja (2010), demonstrated this point clearly by stating that the human settlement study in Indonesia became significant soon after WWII ended and was included in the planning for the construction of Kebayoran Baru in 1948.

Moreover, Silver (2008) also added by stating that the master plan of Kebayoran Baru illustrated the garden city scheme so eminently that it inspired the planning and development principles for Greater Jakarta in 1952. In other words, it was the garden city idea that was written in the larger context of metropolitan Jakarta. In Indonesia's post-independence era, Kebayoran Baru drew much attention and served as a model for constructing new cities (Colombijn & Kusno, 2017).

In the face of all the critiques about how the development of Kebayoran Baru did not turn out as the intended plan, this satellite city has proved to be a significant example of early planning practice in Indonesia, especially in a post-World War II reconstruction era. Unlike the rigorous construction process seen anywhere else in the state, Kebayoran Baru was created at an astounding speed of implementation, from design to mass housing construction (Colombijn, 2014). Since the plan's approval in September 1948, it only took five months to acquire the entire land area, finalise the master plan, and start construction.

Kebayoran Baru today is no longer a separated city as initially envisioned but rather an essential part of Greater Jakarta in general, particularly one of the activities centres in South Jakarta. As quoted by Roosmalen (2005): “Kebayoran Baru today in many parts and ways is a pleasant district where spacious residential areas with abundant green spaces and busy business areas alternate in an enjoyable way and it's considered the centre of Jakarta by many” (p. 21).

=== Post-war architecture ===
Most buildings in Kebayoran Baru were designed following the principle of functionalism, that is making use of the latest building material (reinforced concrete) and taking into consideration the principle of tropical design - to maximize natural lighting while minimizing the heat without the use of electricity. Post-war modernism style e.g. the so-called Yankee-type or Jengki style were popular in Kebayoran Baru, so called because of its heavy influence from the American post-war modernism. For example, middle-class houses in Kebayoran were designed with a square or rectangular layout, but the first floor is tilted forward to protect the facade of the lower level from the sun. Lower-level official houses in Kebayoran make use of front patio. Larger villas in Kebayoran were usually designed by well-known Indies architects at that time such as Job & Sprey and Liem Bwan Tjie. The current Kebayoran Baru district also includes some villages which is not part of the original plan. These additions are now located in Radio area, Gandaria Utara, and Cipete Utara.

Being a design older than 50 years, Kebayoran Baru is considered a cultural heritage (Cagar Budaya) according to Law no. D.IV-6099/d/33/1975. New modern international style developments in the area has been a threat to the historic tropical residential character of Kebayoran Baru.

=== Radio Kebajoran ===
To the southwest of the residential area of Kebayoran was the Radio Kebajoran, a radio broadcasting station located just to the west of Block A. The area of radio broadcasting station has never been fully developed, however the name lingers in the name of the streets Jalan Radio Dalam (inner Radio street) and Jalan Antene ("Antennae" street). Jalan KH. Ahmad Dahlan was formerly named Jalan Radio (Radio Street), the street that leads to the Radio Kebajoran complex. The entire area planned as Radio Kebajoran complex is now located in Gandaria Utara Administrative Village.

=== Residential district ===
Kebayoran Baru is one of the most affluent areas of Jakarta, where many wealthy citizens reside. Many prominent Indonesians live in the district, including Jusuf Kalla (Vice President of Indonesia and business tycoon), Guruh Sukarnoputra (son of Sukarno and an artist) with his mother Fatmawati, Hary Tanoesoedibjo (Indonesian media tycoon), and Tomy Winata (businessman and the owner of Artha Graha Bank), among others. Kebayoran Baru, and the district of Menteng, is the most expensive residential districts in Indonesia, having very high land prices per square foot.

Although Kebayoran Baru, in the Sukarno era, was solely a residential area, the district now harbors many commercial ventures, is known for its lifestyle businesses. The southern part of the neighborhood is filled with large mansions with lots ranging from 500 square meters to 6000 square meters. The northern part of the city is dominated by luxury apartments and office buildings. Senayan is notable for its large concentration of businesses run by Korean expatriates in Indonesia, a trend which began as early as 1982.

== Landmarks ==
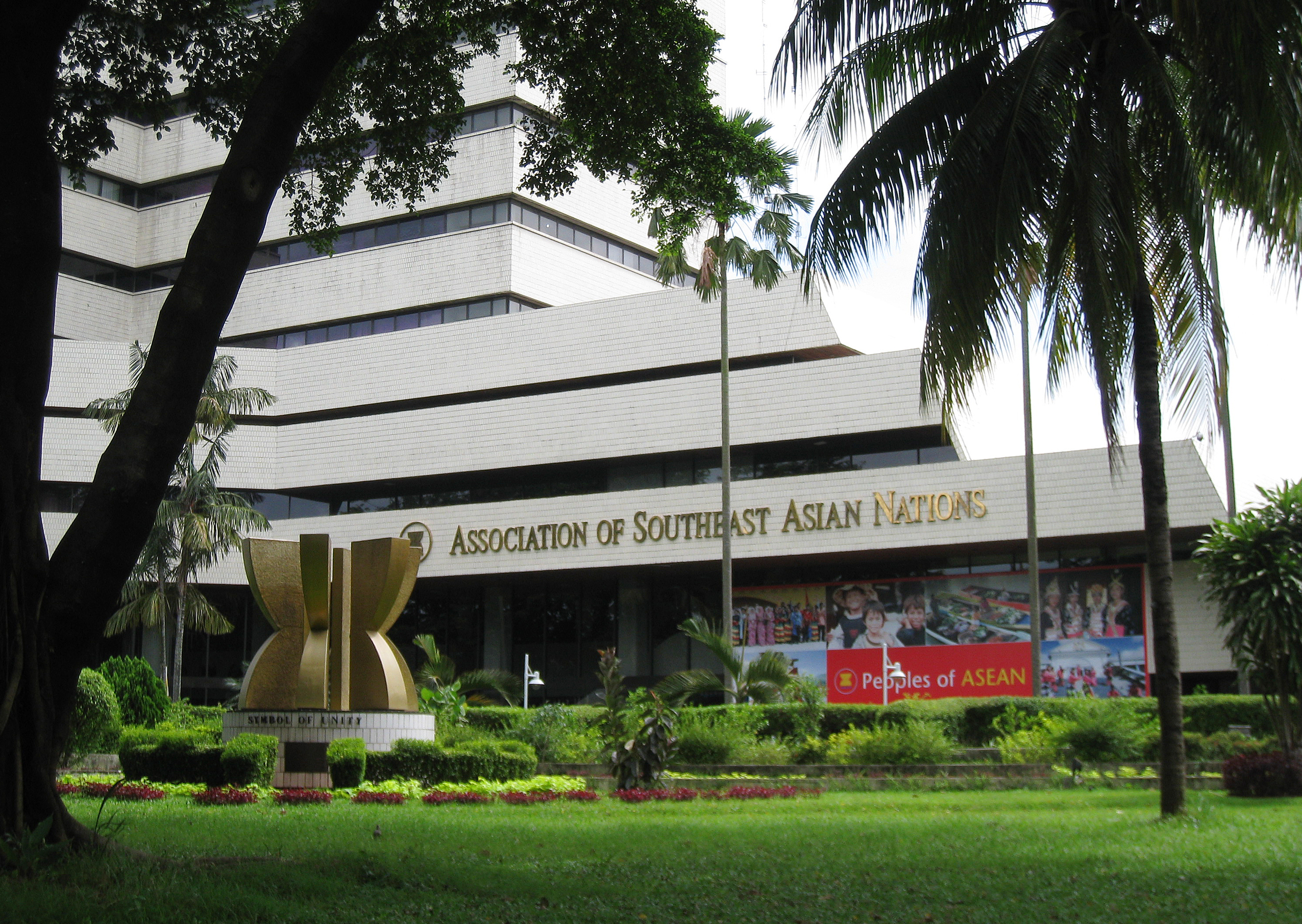
The ASEAN headquarters building is located in the garden city-planned Kebayoran Baru.

- Blok M central market and bus terminal, which contains the Blok M mall
- Blok A and Blok M BCA stations of the Jakarta MRT
- Residence of D.I. Pandjaitan
- Residence of Sukarno
- Sudirman Tower
- CSW-ASEAN TOD

== Facilities ==
Because it was conceptualized as a satellite city from the early times, all the facilities that support a community can be found in Kebayoran Baru.

=== Education ===
- Al-Azhar Mosque and school complex
- Jakarta Intercultural School Pattimura Campus
- TK Tarakanita 1
- SD Tarakanita 1
- SMP Tarakanita 5
- SMP-SMA Labschool Kebayoran
- SMAN 6 Jakarta (6th Public Senior High School Jakarta)
- SMAN 46 Jakarta (46th Public Senior High School Jakarta)
- SMAN 70 Jakarta (70th Public Senior High School Jakarta)
- SMAN 82 Jakarta (82nd Public Senior High School Jakarta)
- SMPN 11 Jakarta (11th Public Junior High School Jakarta)
- SMPN 12 Jakarta (12th Public Junior High School Jakarta)
- SMPN 13 Jakarta (13th Public Junior High School Jakarta)
- SMPN 19 Jakarta (19th Public Junior High School Jakarta)
- SMPN 29 Jakarta (29th Public Junior High School Jakarta)
- SMPN 240 Jakarta (240th Public Junior High School Jakarta)
- SMPN 250 Jakarta (250th Public Junior High School Jakarta)

=== Religious ===
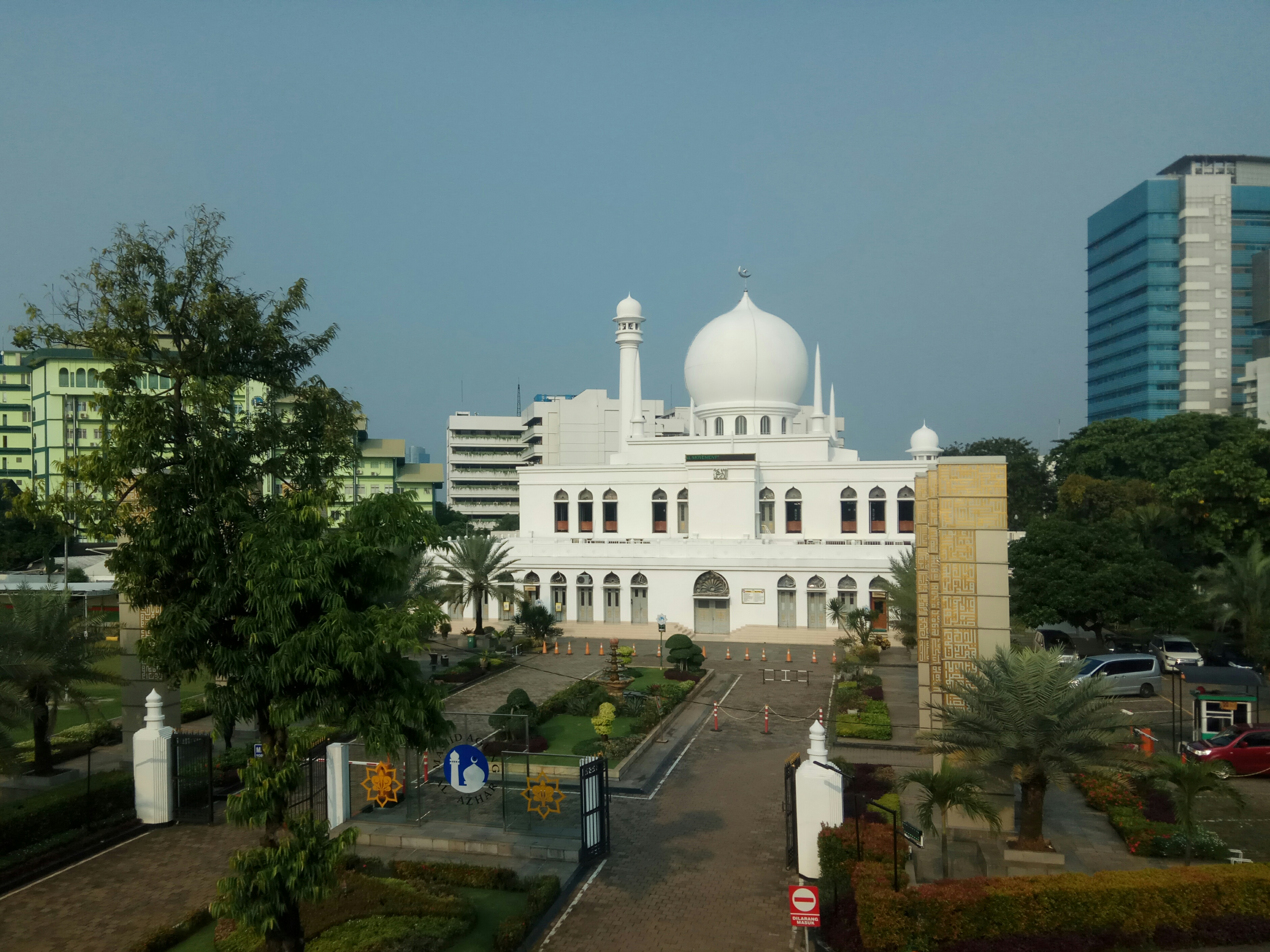
The Al-Azhar Great Mosque seen from the Jakarta MRT

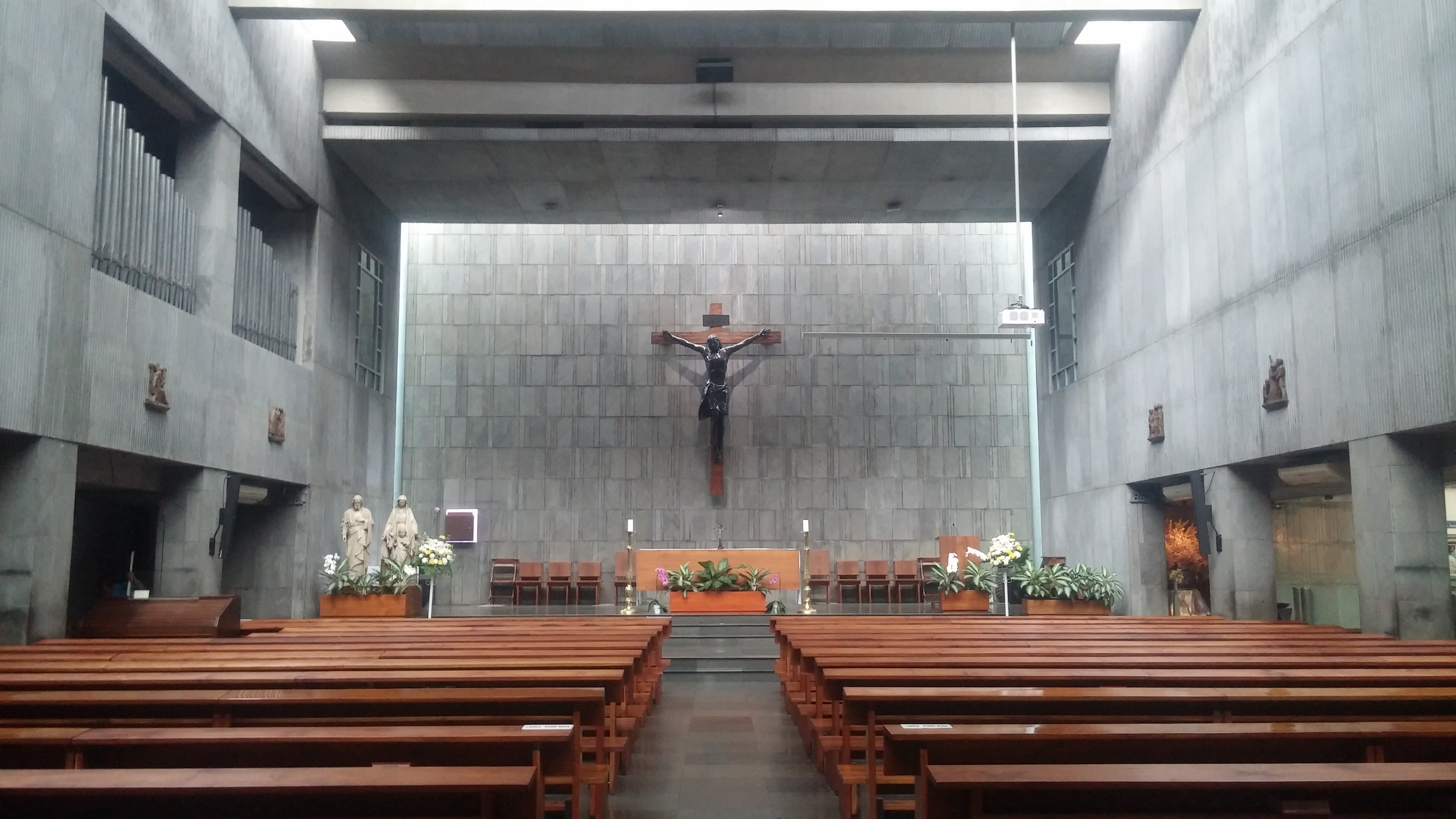
Gereja Santa Perawan Maria Ratu Paroki Blok Q

- Al-Azhar Great Mosque
- Al-Amjad Mosque
- Al-Kausar Mosque
- Santa Perawan Maria Ratu Paroki Church
- Santo Yohanes Penginjil Church
- PGI Church
- Effatha Church

=== Health ===
- Pertamina Central Hospital
- Brawijaya Women & Children's Hospital
- Asih Maternity Hospital
- Kebayoran Hospital (closed in 2002)

There are also several puskesmas (health clinic) that mainly serves the lower middle class society.

=== Commercial ===
==== Markets ====
Markets (pasar) managed by the Jakarta Provincial Government (under PD Pasar Jaya) in this sub-district includes:

- Blok M Market
- Blok A Market
- Pasar Cipete
- Mayestik Market
- Pasar Santa

Along with the development of the city, shopping centers that are managed by the private sector have also emerged. There are also trading centers for specialty goods, although some are not well planned, such as:

- Building materials center on Panglima Polim Street
- Birds market on Barito street
- Auto parts market in Cipete
- Flower and ornamental fish market on Radio Dalam

There was once a flower and ornamental fish market in the Barito Park area but since late 2007 the location has been moved to the Radio Dalam area because Barito Park is designated as an open green area.

==== Shopping malls ====
- Blok M Plaza id
- Blok M Square id
- Pasaraya Grande
- Darmawangsa Square shopping center
- ITC Fatmawati
- ASHTA District 8
- Pacific Place Jakarta

==== Offices ====
- Sudirman Central Business District

=== City parks ===
As a planned community with the principle of a garden city, Kebayoran Baru have numerous major and minor city parks (taman kota). Here are the list of city parks on Kebayoran Baru.

- Bendera Pusaka Park, resulted from the merger of Ayodya, Langsat and Leuser parks.
- Puring Park
- Kerinci Park
- Mataram Park, located between the Sisingamangaraja and Pattimura Street. There is a statue of Yuri Gagarin (1934-1968), a Soviet cosmonaut and the first human in space. The statue was inaugurated to commemorate the 70th anniversary of the diplomatic relations between indonesia and Russia.
- Martha Christina Tiahahu Literacy Park, located adjacent to the Blok M area. It was revitalized in 2022 to be part of the transit-oriented development of Blok M BCA MRT station. The park has several facilities for literacy activities, such as libraries, discussion rooms and book stores. Thus, Martha Christina Tiahahu Literacy Park is a combination between a city park and a library.
- Suryo Park
- Melawai Park
- Dharmawangsa Park
- Gandaria Tengah Park
- Sanjaya Park
- Daha Park
- Mendawai Park
- Wijaya Park
- Mayestik Park
- Prapanca Park

=== Government ===
==== Central Government Offices ====
- Ministry of Public Works and Housing
- Ministry of Agrarian Affairs and Spatial Planning id
- Attorney General's Office of Indonesia
- Indonesian National Police Headquarters

==== Diplomatic offices ====
- ASEAN Secretariat
- Embassies of
  - Suriname (Note: Address:Jl. Dharmawangsa VIII No. 16 Kebayoran Baru)
  - Tanzania (Note: Address:Jl. Iskandarsyah II No. 89A, RW.01, Melawai, Kebayoran Baru)
  - Uzbekistan (Note: Address:Jl. Sriwijaya Raya No. 30 Kebayoran Baru)

==== Regional Government offices ====
- South Jakarta City Hall
- Greater Jakarta Metropolitan Regional Police Headquarters (Polda Metro Jaya)

=== Others ===
- State Electricity Company (PLN) building
- Indonesia Stock Exchange

== Cited works ==
- Colombijn, Freek (2013). Under Construction: The Politics of Urban Space and Housing during the Decolonization of Indonesia, 1930-1960 Verhandelingen van het Koninklijk Instituut voor Taal-, Land- en Volkenkunde. BRILL. ISBN 978-9004263932.
- de Vletter, M.E.; Voskuil, R.P.G.A.; van Diessen, J.R. (1999). Batavia/Djakarta/Jakarta - Beeld van een Stad. Purmerend: Asia Maior. ISBN 9074861091.
- Djakarta - Kebajoran (Map). 1:15,000. Pembina. 1971.
- Merrillees, Scott (2015). Jakarta: Portraits of a Capital 1950-1980. Jakarta: Equinox Publishing. ISBN 978-6028397308.
