= Al-Azhar Great Mosque =

Mosque in Jakarta, Indonesia

- Masjid Agung Al-Azhar
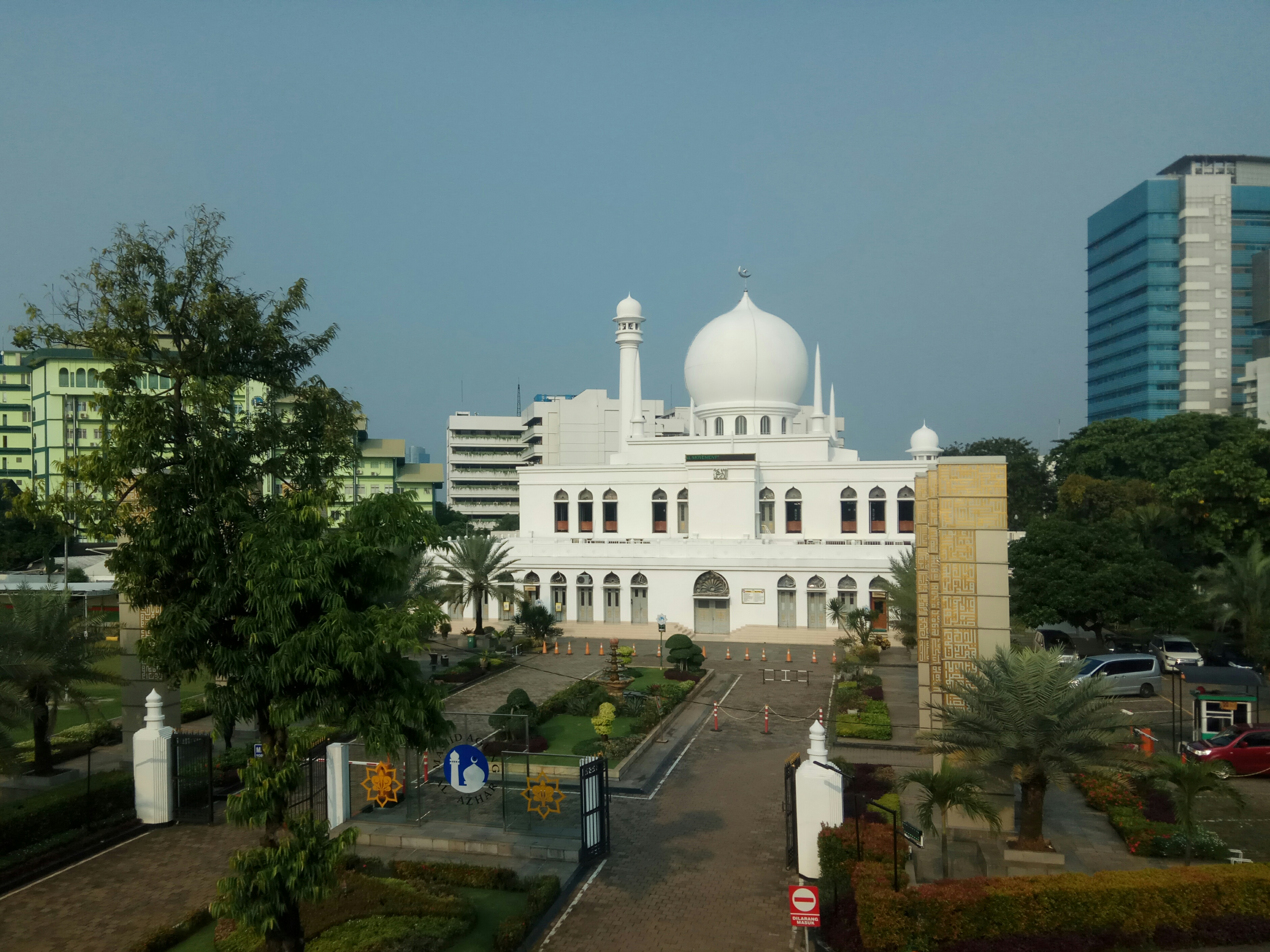
- Masjid Agung Al-Azhar in 2021

Religion
- Affiliation: Islam
- Branch/tradition: Sunni
- Ownership: Al-Azhar Islamic Dormitory School Foundation

Location
- Location: Kebayoran Baru, Jakarta, Indonesia
- Interactive map of Al-Azhar Great Mosque
- Coordinates: 6.2351614°S 106.7993264°E

Architecture
- Architect: Friedrich Silaban
- Type: Mosque
- Style: Middle East
- Groundbreaking: November 19, 1953
- Completed: 1958

Specifications
- Capacity: 10,000
- Dome: 1
- Minaret: 1
- Site area: 43.755 M^{2}

Website
- Masjid Agung Jakarta

Al-Azhar Great Mosque (Indonesian: Masjid Agung Al-Azhar) is a mosque located in Jalan Sisingamangaraja, Kebayoran Baru, Jakarta. The mosque was constructed between 1953 and 1958. It was originally known simply as Mesjid Agung (Great Mosque). It was Jakarta's largest mosque when it was built until it was surpassed by the Istiqlal Mosque, which was completed in 1978. Al-Azhar mosque and its complex are best known for their educational works.

== History ==
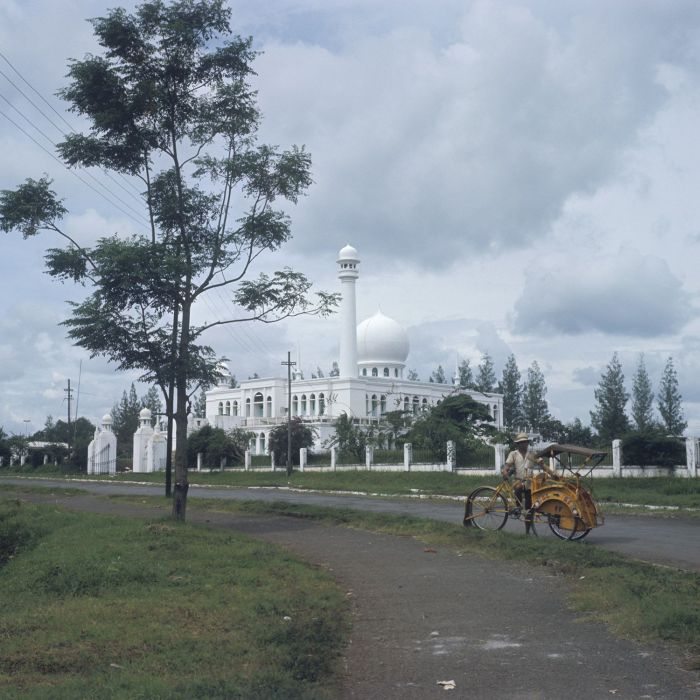
Al Azhar Great Mosque.

The idea for a building of a mosque and a school in Kebayoran Baru was initiated by 14 people from the Masyumi Party. Under the recommendation of Syamsudin, Indonesian Ministry of Social Affairs at that time, the 14 figures founded the Islamic Dormitory School Foundation (Yayasan Pesantren Islam or YPI) on April 7, 1952. The Ministry of Religious Affairs had provided a limited start-up fund for the construction of a mosque and a school, while the mayor of Jakarta donated a 4 hectares of land in the new suburb of Kebayoran Baru. Under the advice of Hamka - an Indonesian ulama and political activist - it was suggested that a mosque was built first before the school, "but with plenty of office space and meeting rooms so that while the school building is still under construction, the mosque can initiate a full round activities, including classes." With the society established, construction of the mosque commenced on November 19, 1953. The mosque was completed in 1958 and officially inaugurated as Masjid Agung Kebayoran or Kebayoran Great Mosque. At the time of its completion it was the largest mosque in Jakarta.

The Great Mosque became the Al-Azhar Great Mosque following the suggestion of the Grand Imam of al-Azhar Mahmud Shaltut, who made an official visit to the Jakarta in 1960. Shaltut also recognized Hamka as the Imam Besar ("Chief Imam") of the Al-Azhar Great Mosque. For Hamka, his new role as an imam reflected his disaffection with the wayward drift of Indonesian life and his growing alarm for Islam in a society that was shadowed by Communism. To help Islam "survive" under this culture, in Hamka views Muslims needed to be more knowledgeable, and so Al-Azhar Great Mosque would become a centre of Muslims modern revival and a center for dakwah (propagation of faith). During the 1965-1966 crisis following the 30 September Movement, Al-Azhar Great Mosque became the centre of anti-communist campaign among the Muslims.

In 1967, a kindergarten was established in the Al-Azhar Mosque complex. The educational works of the Al-Azhar finally culminates with the establishment of the nearby Al-Azhar University Indonesia in 2000.

Al-Azhar Great Mosque was made a Jakarta heritage site and a national cultural heritage on August 19, 1993.

== Building ==
Al-Azhar Great Mosque is topped with a white onion dome, following the architecture of mosque in the Middle East. It has one minaret.

Al-Azhar Great Mosque was established not just as a mosque but also as a center of social activities and dakwah. It was among the first "modern" mosques of Indonesia in which a mosque building is completed with modern facilities such as an Islamic library, a lecture and a seminar hall, a health clinic, classes for both religious and secular subject, and dormitories.

== See also ==
- Islam in Indonesia
- List of mosques in Indonesia
