= Bendera Pusaka Park =

Urban park in Kebayoran Baru, Jakarta, Indonesia

- Taman Bendera Pusaka
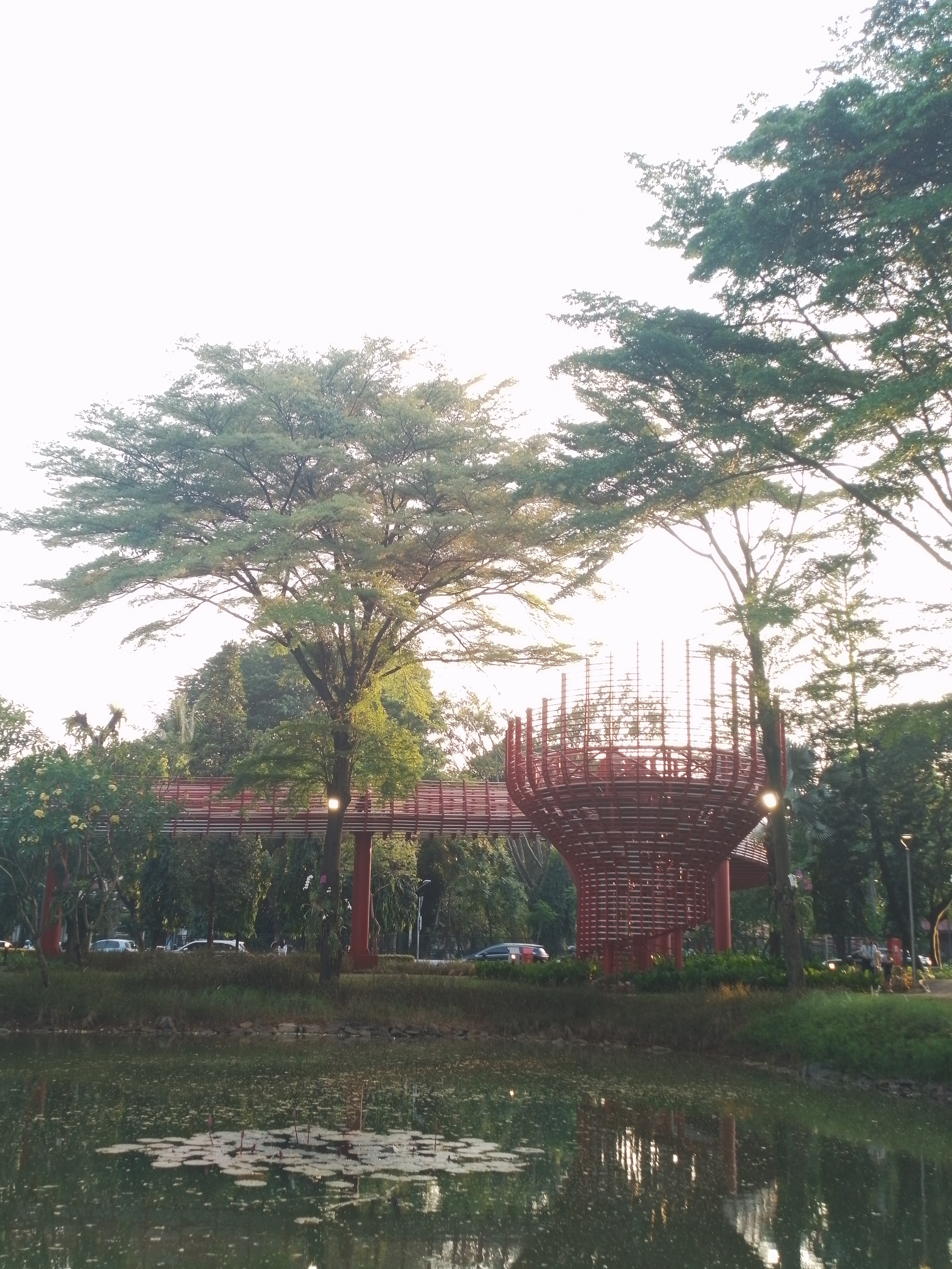
- The skybridge that connects the east and south zones of the park, 2026
- Interactive map of Bendera Pusaka Park
- Type: Urban park
- Location: Kebayoran Baru, South Jakarta, Jakarta, Indonesia
- Coordinates: 6.243711°S 106.792719°E
- Area: 5.6 ha (14 acres)
- Opened: 14 March 2026 (current form)
- Owner: Jakarta Provincial Government
- Operator: Integrasi Transit Jakarta
- Public transit: Blok M BCA; Blok M; Mayestik

Bendera Pusaka Park (Indonesian: Taman Bendera Pusaka, lit. 'Heirloom Flag Park') is a 5.6-hectare (14-acre) urban park in the Kebayoran Baru district of South Jakarta, Indonesia, located near the famous commercial quarter of Blok M to the east. It has an L-shaped design with an east-south-north alignment, which is formed by the merger of the existing Ayodya, Langsat and Leuser parks.

== History ==
The district (kecamatan) of Kebayoran Baru was originally developed as a standalone planned satellite city of Batavia (now Jakarta) after World War II, carrying the principles of "garden city" onto its design. Thus, the planned city design has included many urban parks and other green spaces, including three separated yet adjacent parks in block C near Kyai Maja street, a site that what is now lies within the Kramat Pela subdistrict (kelurahan). These three parks were later known as Ayodya, Langsat and Leuser parks, divided by the Barito and Kyai Maja streets to the east and north.

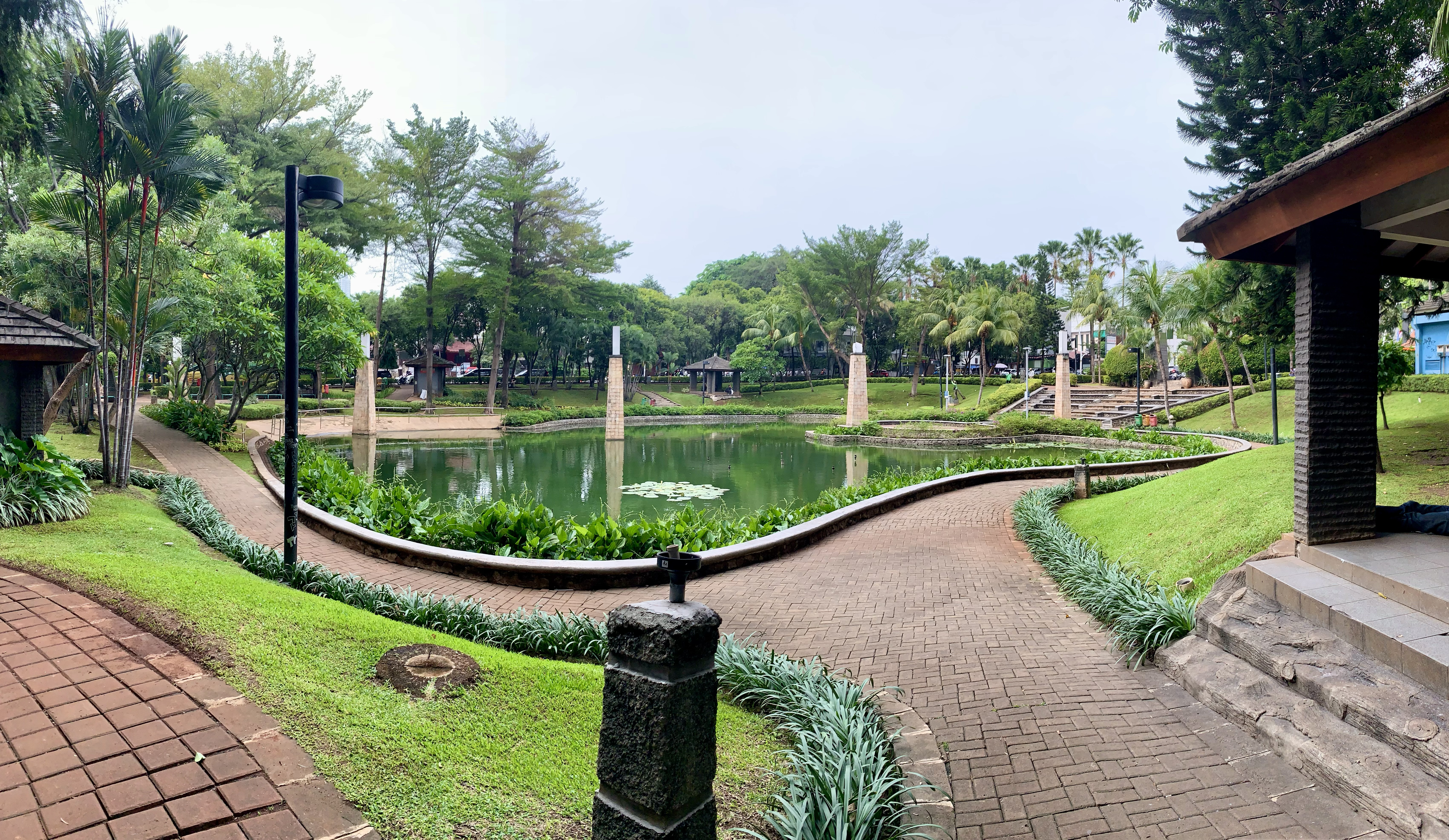
Pond at Ayodya Park prior to revitalization and transformation into Bendera Pusaka Park, 2023

To the east of Langsat Park, there is Barito Street, where there used to be a row of kiosks for ornamental bird traders outside the compound, which had already existed since the 1970s. Ayodya Park, formerly named Barito Park, was partially used for ornamental animal and flower kiosks that covered its frontage. These kiosks were inaugurated by then Jakarta Governor Ali Sadikin in 1970 and were collectively known as the "Barito Market" (Pasar Barito). In January 2008, the Jakarta Provincial Government under Fauzi Bowo ordered the demolition of about 150 kiosks of the Barito Market, in order to restore Barito Park as an open green space. It drew clashes during the process. The traders were relocated to the nearby markets, but some of them were given new kiosks along the eastern border of the Langsat Park at Barito street. The reinstated Barito Park was reinaugurated as "Ayodya Park" by Governor Fauzi Bowo on 15 March 2009.

In July 2025, Governor Pramono Anung envisioned an "ASEAN Park" near the commercial square of Blok M; it was revealed that the vision is in a form of the revitalization and merger of Ayodya, Langsat and Leuser parks. However, the plan name was changed to "Taman Bendera Pusaka" ('Heirloom Flag Park'). Because of this, the ornamental bird kiosks along the eastern border of Langsat Park had to be relocated and the traders initially refused to do so. On 8 August 2025, a groundbreaking ceremony was held to start the revitalization and merging process; it was surreptitiously held to avoid protests from the traders. The ornamental bird kiosks remained in site until they were ultimately demolished in late October 2025 and were later relocated on a site near Lenteng Agung railway station.

The revitalization and merging process costed around 100 billion rupiah and was funded through corporate social responsibility. On 14 March 2026, the Bendera Pusaka Park was inaugurated by Governor Pramono Anung and former Indonesian President Megawati Sukarnoputri.

== Monument ==
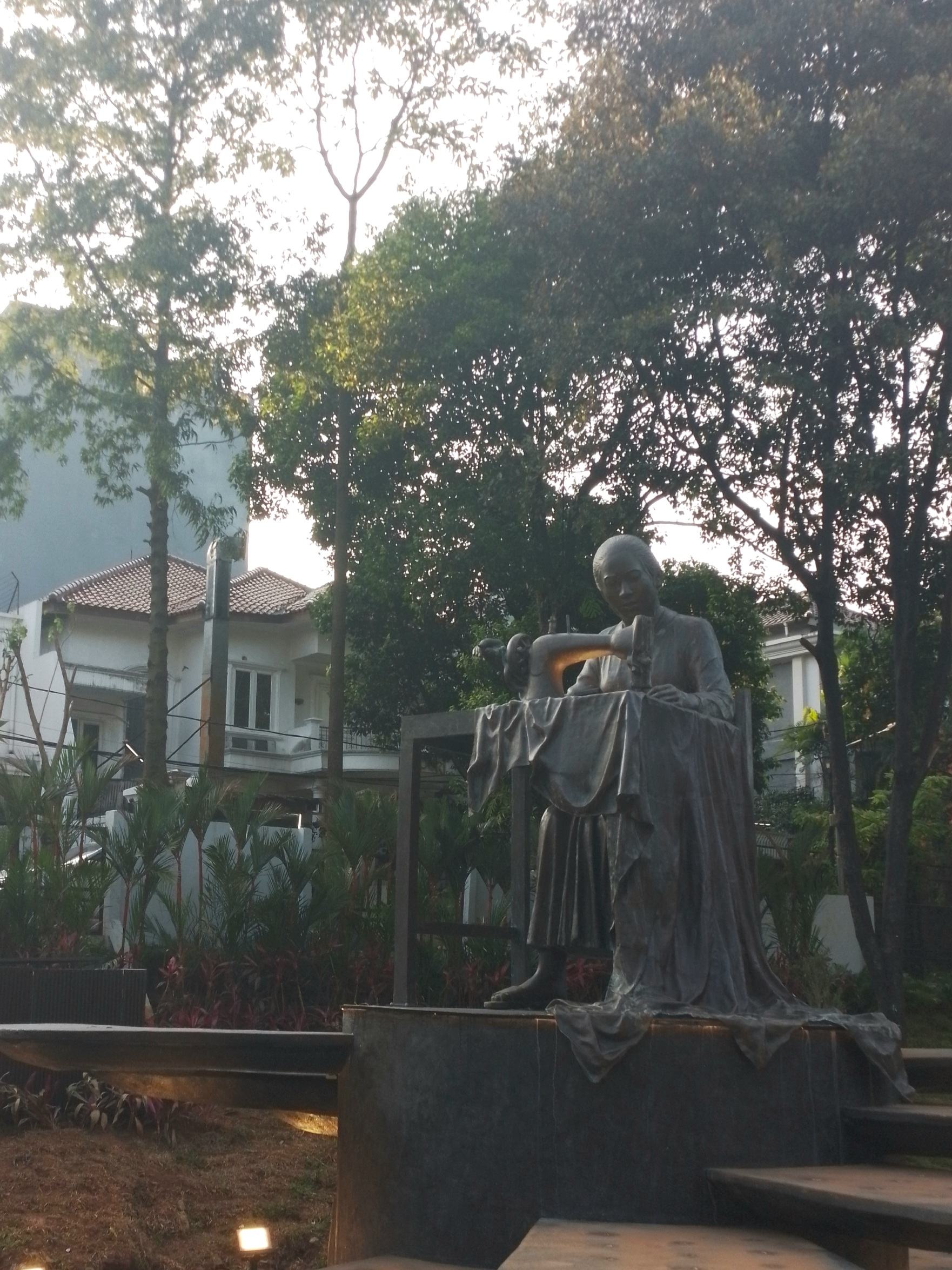
Statue of Fatmawati sewing the bendera pusaka

There is one monument within Bendera Pusaka Park, namely the statue of the first lady Fatmawati, the third wife of the first Indonesian President Sukarno. Designed by Teguh Ostenrik, it depicts her sewing the bendera pusaka, the first Indonesian flag flown during the Independence Procamation on 17 August 1945.

== Facilities ==
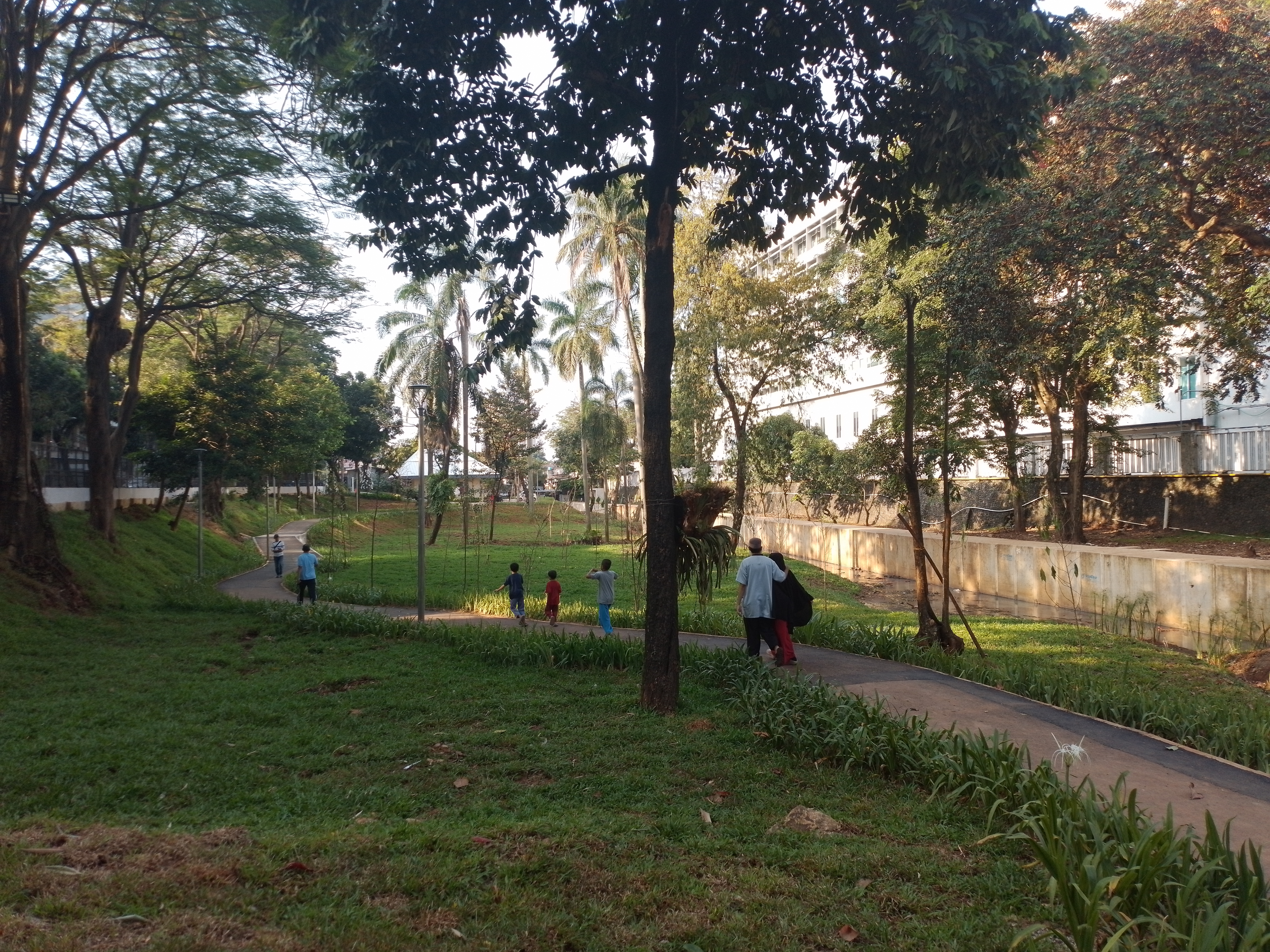
North zone of the park

With a total area of 5.6 hectares (14 acres), Bendera Pusaka Park is divided into three zones: the east (formerly Ayodya Park), south (Langsat) and north (Leuser) zones. It has an iconically-designed red skybridge that connects the east and south zones, which is inspired by the span of the Indonesian flag and mimics those in Tebet Eco Park. The south and north zones are connected via a tunnel below the Kyai Maja street, in line with a canal. The park includes a 1,2-kilometre jogging track, multifunction halls, musalla (small space for Islamic prayers) basketball court, and a free-to-access padel court.

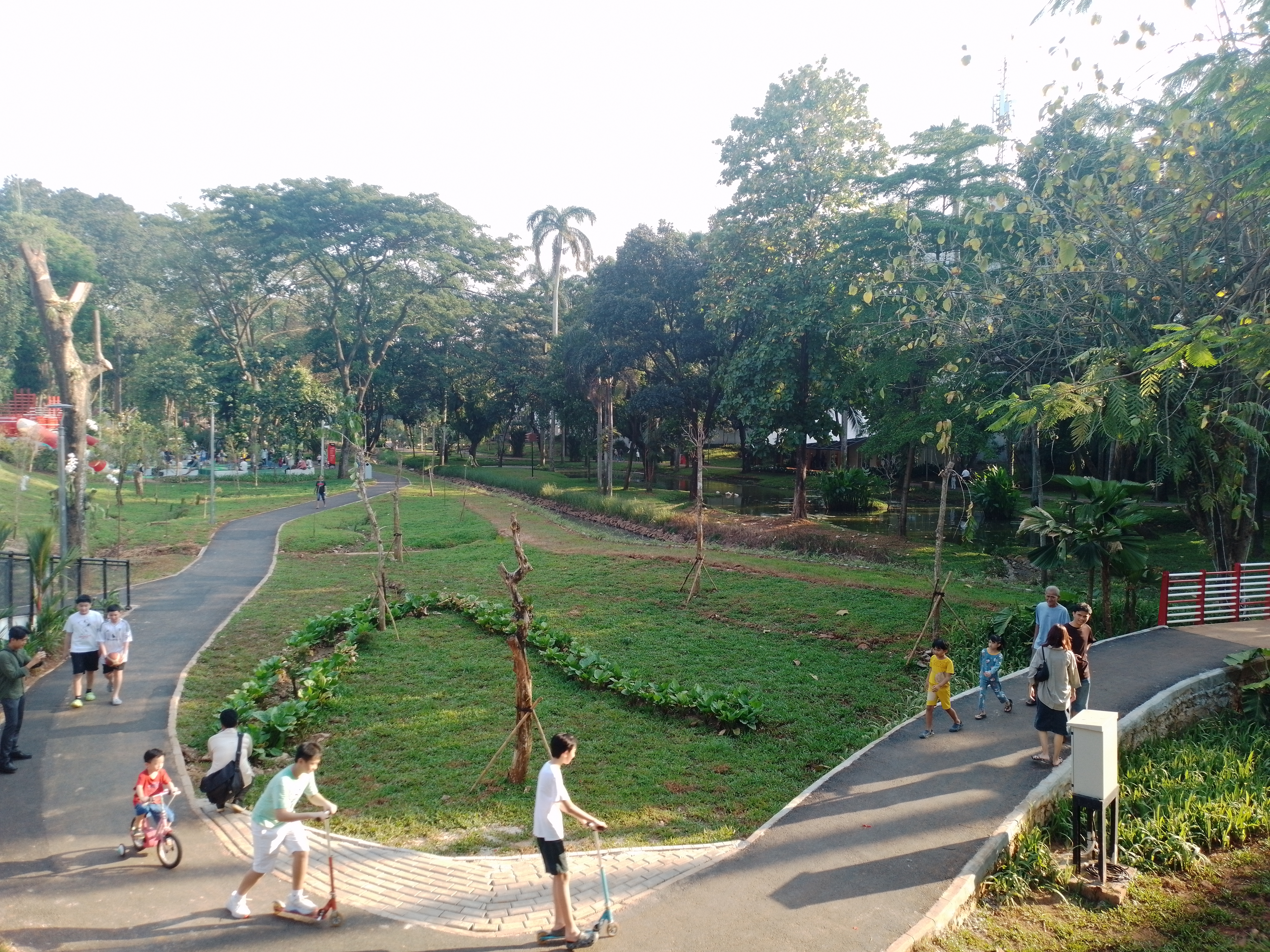
South zone of the park

== Transportation ==
Bendera Pusaka Park is primarily accessible via the Transjakarta bus rapid transit (BRT) network. The nearest Transjakarta BRT station is the Mayestik BRT station of Corridor 13 to the west at Kyai Maja Street and the Blok M Bus Terminal of Corridor 1 to the east. The network also provides feeder services that pass and stop around the park. Aside from that, Bendera Pusaka Park is also accessible with the Jakarta MRT with an approximately 400-metre walk from Blok M BCA MRT station.

== Criticisms ==
About two weeks after inauguration, the canal at Bendera Pusaka Park became an eyesore as it was polluted and releasing a foul smelling odor. The management said that a waste treatment installation was still under construction to relieve the issue, which was due to be finished by June 2026. During the inauguration, Pramono promised that, once the waste treatment is operating, the canal will be "as clean and crystal clear as those in Korea". As of September 2026, the canal has become clean as promised.

== See also ==
- Kebayoran Baru
- Tebet Eco Park, another urban park in the Tebet district with a similar design concept
