= Divine Service =

Divine Service may refer to:

- Divine Service (Lutheran), a term for the Eucharistic liturgy in Lutheran churches
- Divine Service (Eastern Orthodoxy), the name of the Byzantine version of the canonical hours

== See also ==
- Divine Office (disambiguation)
- Divine Worship (disambiguation)
