= Gereja Santa =

Church in Indonesia

Church of the Queen Saint Mary the Virgin Parish of Block Q
- Indonesian: Gereja Santa Perawan Maria Ratu Paroki Blok Q
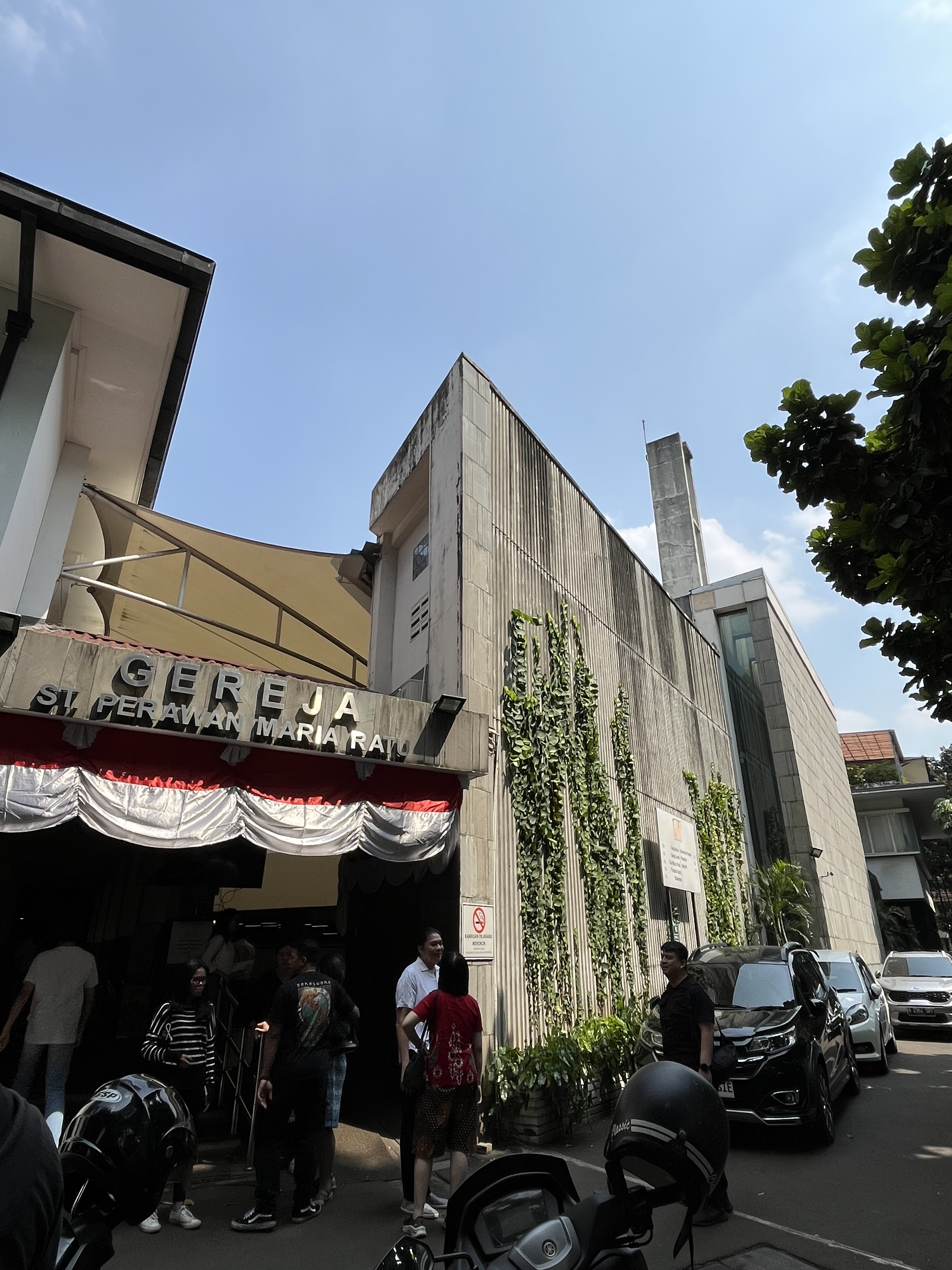
- Exterior of the new church building
- Church of the Queen Saint Mary the Virgin Parish of Block Q
- 6°14′18″S 106°48′52″E
- Location: Jl. Suryo No. 62, RT.1/RW.4, Rawa Barat, Kebayoran Baru, Kota Jakarta Selatan, Daerah Khusus Ibukota Jakarta 12180
- Country: Indonesia
- Denomination: Roman Catholic
- Website: gerejasanta.org

History
- Status: Church

Architecture
- Functional status: Active
- Years built: 1 June 1956; 69 years ago

Administration
- Archdiocese: Jakarta

The Gereja Santa Perawan Maria Ratu Paroki Blok Q (Indonesian for "Church of the Queen Saint Mary the Virgin Parish of Block Q"), abbreviated as Gereja SPMR Blok Q, or also known as the Gereja Santa is a Catholic parish church in Jakarta, Indonesia. The area of Santa in Kebayoran Baru, South Jakarta and Pasar Santa (Santa Market) are named after this church.

== History ==
The beginning of the founding of the Gereja Santa was started by several Catholic families in the Kebayoran Baru area. Once assembled, since 1951, the Eucharist was held every Sunday at the Hofland family home. The number of people was around 40 people. With the rapid growth within Kebayoran Baru area, in the middle of 1952 the number of people reached 1,500 people. Therefore, it was felt the need for a church building. The community temporarily joined the parish of Block B. Finally, on March 16, 1955, the people managed to get a land area of 2980 square meters, with Occupatie Vergunning number 1573, at Jl. Suryo 62, which was later built into the SPMR Church.

The Church of the Queen Virgin Mary—hereinafter abbreviated to the SPMR Church—with the capacity of 400 people, blessed by Mgr. A. Djajasepoetra, SJ on 1 June 1956. The date was used as a milestone for the establishment of the SPMR Church. Since then, the SPMR Church stands as an independent parish with its own book of baptism. Pengurus Gereja dan Dana Papa Roma Katolik Gereja Santa Perawan Maria Ratu ("The Church Council and the Roman Catholic Queen Virgin Mary Fund for the Poor") were formed through the decree of the Archbishop of Jakarta, Mgr. A. Djajasepoetra, SJ, number 54/B5-2/70 dated January 28, 1970. The number of people reached more than 4,000 people. On 29 April 1974, the church began expanding to accommodate up to 600 people and the construction of a two-story multi-purpose building.

The blessing of the new building was done by Mgr. Leo Soekoto, SJ on December 27, 1975. At the age of 25 years (June 1, 1981), the SPMR Church has 29 neighborhoods with 7 regions. The number of people was more than 5,400 people. Given the need for the expansion of the church due to the rapidly growing number of people, it was decided to build a new church with a location next to the old church. The construction of a new church began with the laying of the first stone by JB. Martosudjito, SJ on May 9, 2004, and finished a year later. Nearing the age of 50, on June 1, 2006, the SPMR Church has a new church building. The old church is still maintained with a capacity of 400 people and the new church building accommodates 800 people. After the construction of the new church building was completed, the old church building was renovated from August 2006 to October 2006 during R. Maryono, SJ as the chief priest. The new church and the two-story parish building attached to each other. Beneath it, there is a basement which is now used as a hall and meeting rooms. The whole area of the basement building is 1875 square meters, while the entire land area of the church complex is 3475 square meters. The area of the old building is 391 square meters.

== Current events ==
Now the number of people is as many as 3,310 people. The number of parishioners who registered as SPMR parishioners decreased considering that some residential areas have been converted into office areas or commercial areas. But on Saturdays and Sundays, many parishioners from outside the parish come to join the Eucharist considering the strategic and accessible church location.

The liturgy is available in Indonesian or English.

== Gallery ==
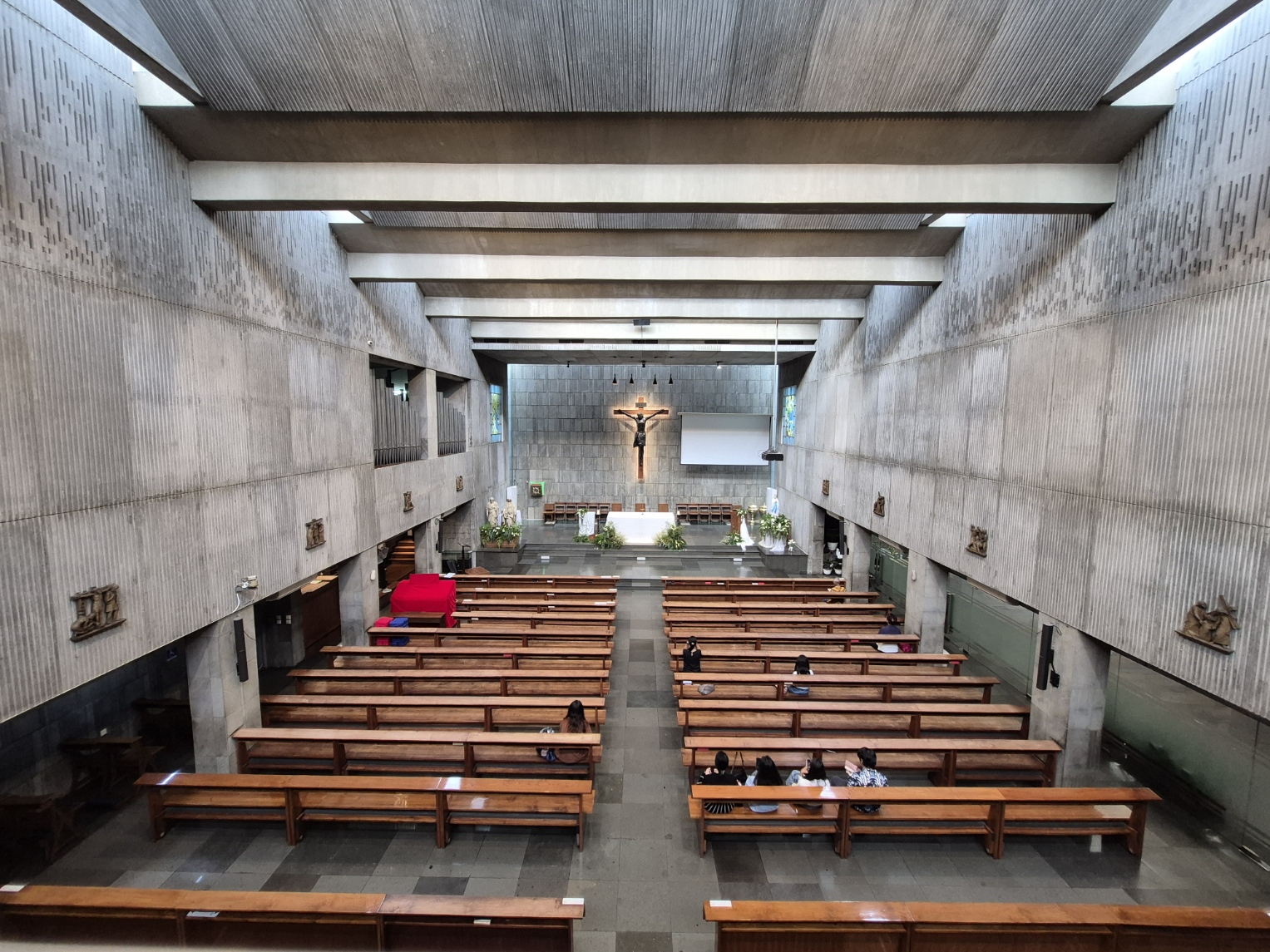
The church interior

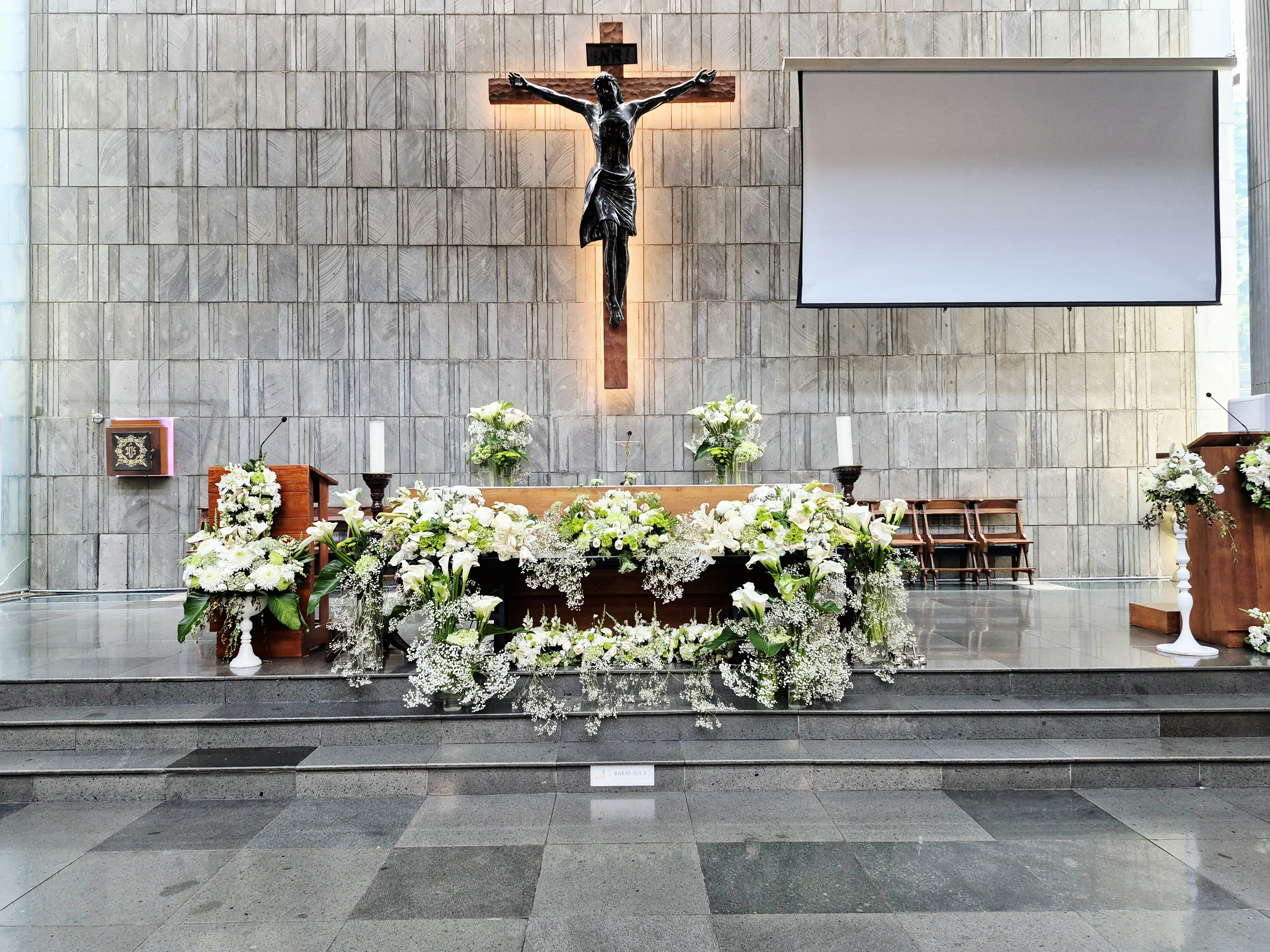
Altar of the church

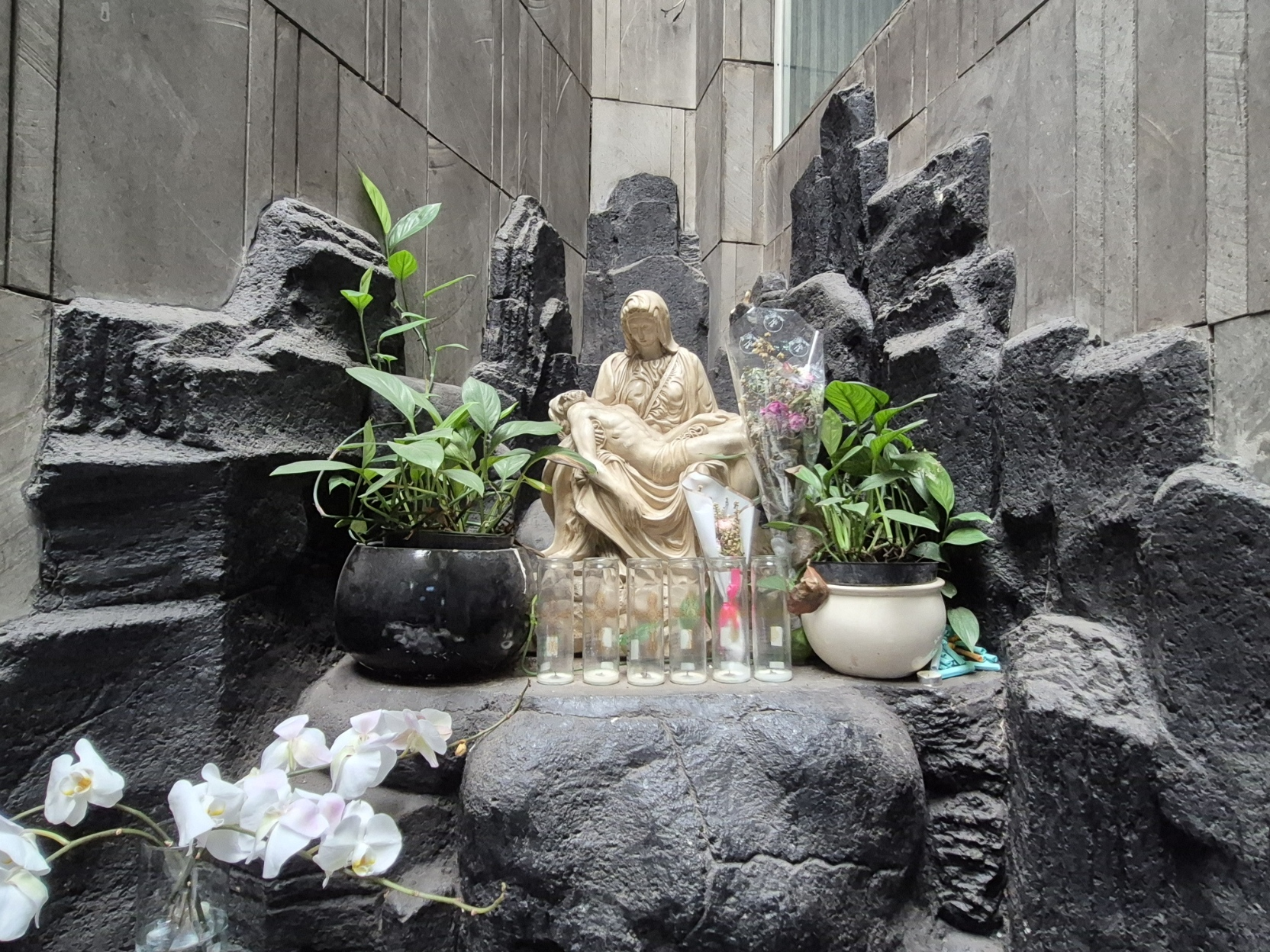
Pietà of the church

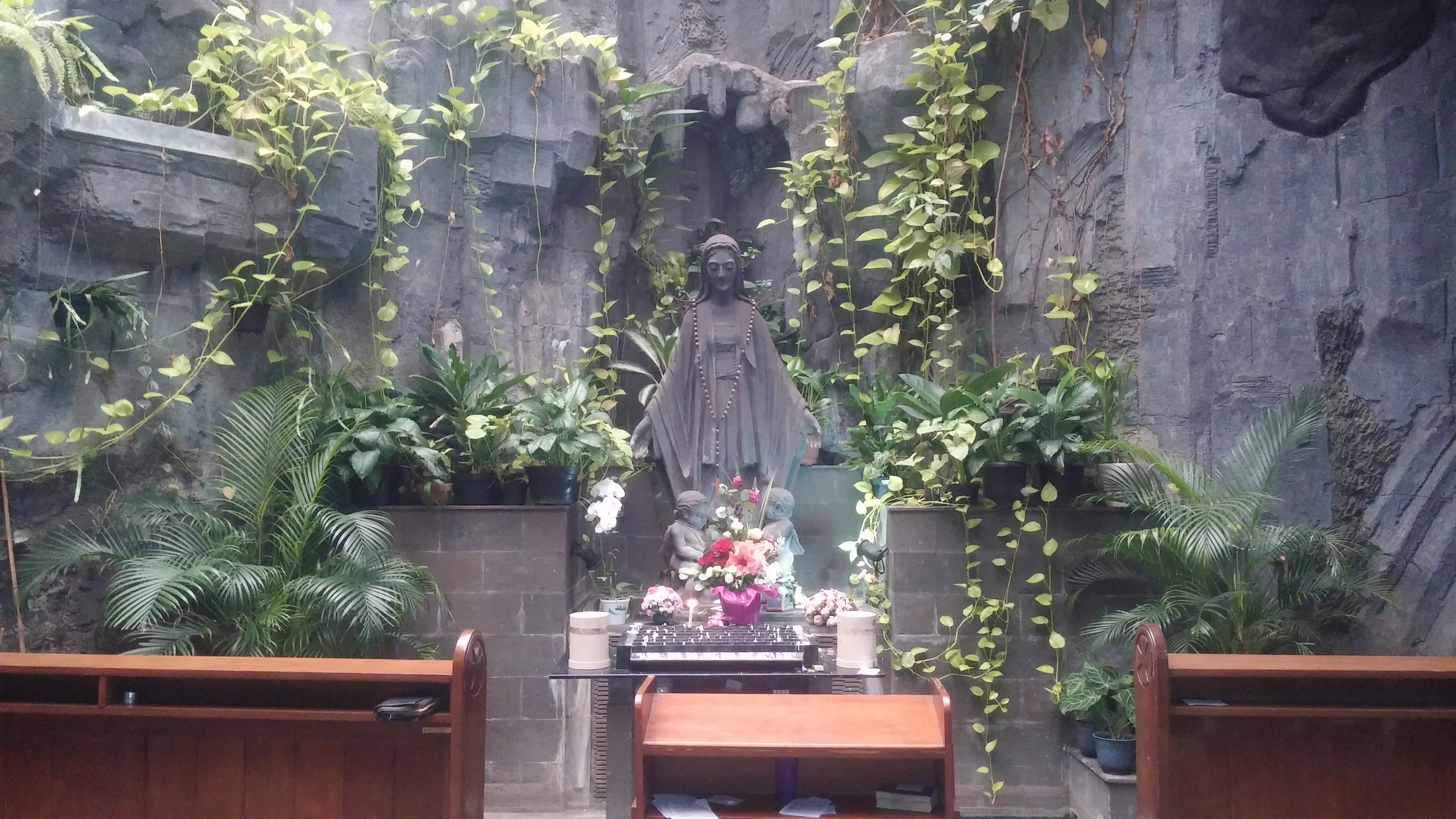
Marian grotto of the church
