= Christian liturgy =

Pattern for worship used by a Christian congregation or denomination

Christian liturgy is a pattern for worship used (whether recommended or prescribed) by a Christian congregation or denomination on a regular basis. The term liturgy comes from Greek and means "public work". Within Christianity, liturgies descending from the same region, denomination, or culture are described as ritual families or rites.

When Christians meet for worship, they perform a liturgy (work), offering service to God together. The majority of Christian denominations hold their principal church service on Sunday, the first day of the week, which is known as the Lord's Day. (Note: The majority of Christian denominations teach that Sunday is the Lord's Day on which all the faithful must assemble to offer worship to God (cf. first-day Sabbatarianism). A minority of Christian denominations that follow seventh-day Sabbatarianism organize worship on Saturdays.) In some Christian denominations, liturgies are held daily, with these including those in which the canonical hours are prayed, as well as the offering of the Eucharistic liturgies such as Mass, among other forms of worship. In addition to this, many Christians attend services of worship on holy days such as Christmas, Ash Wednesday, Good Friday, Ascension Thursday, among others depending on the Christian denomination.

Liturgies are generally presided over by clergy, wherever possible, in some Christian traditions, but lay leaders of worship preside over services in many cases.

== History ==
The holding of church services pertains to the observance of the Lord's Day in Christianity. The Bible has a precedent for a pattern of morning and evening worship that has given rise to Sunday morning and Sunday evening services of worship held in the churches of many Christian denominations today, a "structure to help families sanctify the Lord's Day". In Numbers 28:1–10 and Exodus 29:38–39, "God commanded the daily offerings in the tabernacle to be made once in the morning and then again at twilight". In Psalm 92, which is a prayer concerning the observance of the Sabbath, the prophet David writes "It is good to give thanks to the Lord, to sing praises to your name, O Most High; to declare your steadfast love in the morning, and your faithfulness by night" (cf. Psalm 134:1). Church father Eusebius of Caesarea thus declared: "For it is surely no small sign of God's power that throughout the whole world in the churches of God at the morning rising of the sun and at the evening hours, hymns, praises, and truly divine delights are offered to God. God's delights are indeed the hymns sent up everywhere on earth in his Church at the times of morning and evening."

== Types ==
=== Communion liturgies ===
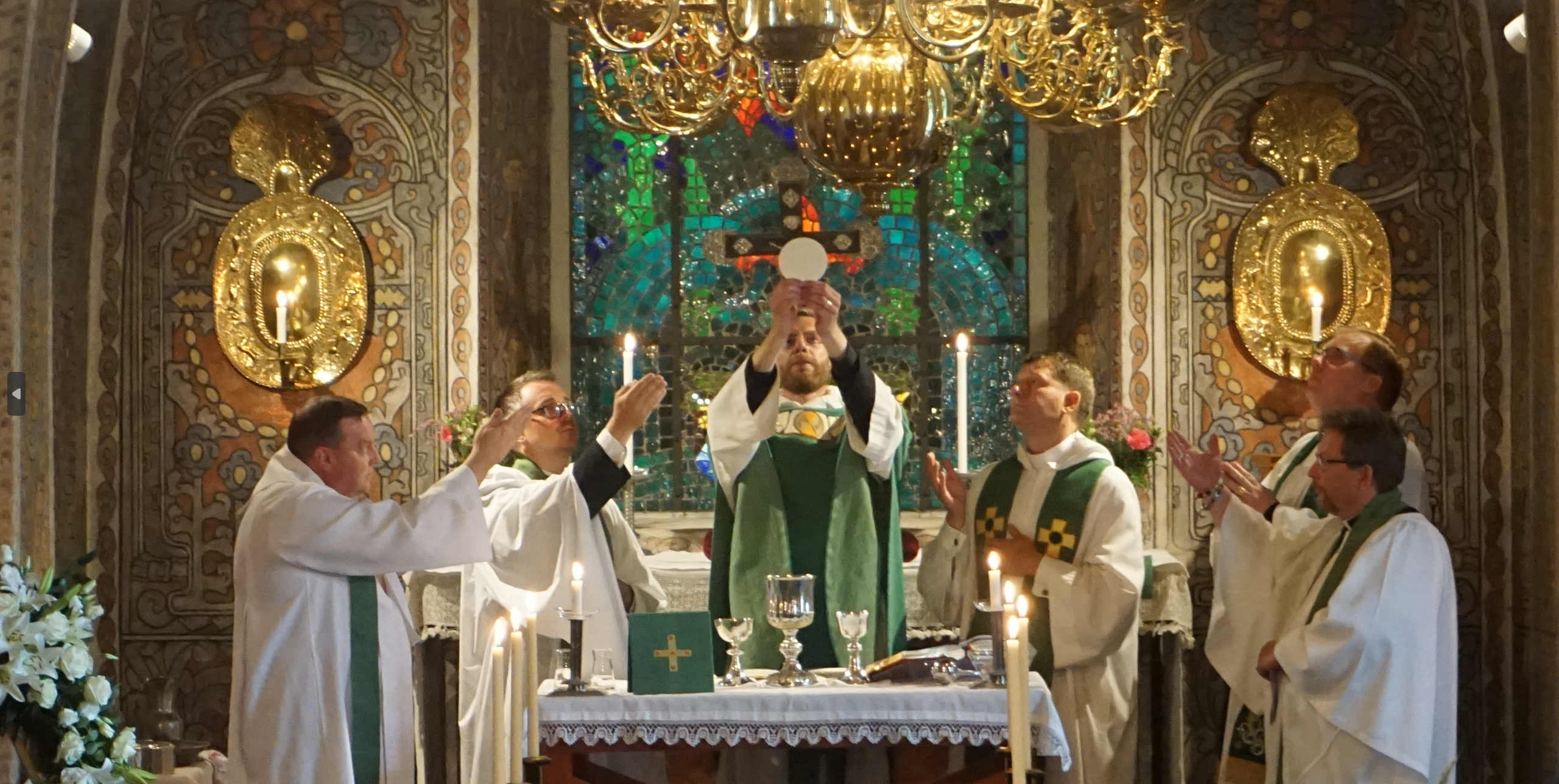
Lutheran priest elevating the host during the Mass at Alsike Church, Sweden

Communion liturgies are those in which the Eucharist is celebrated.

In the Roman Catholic Church, the sacred liturgy in which the Eucharist is celebrated is generally called the Mass. In Latin, the corresponding word is Missa, taken from the dismissal at the end of the liturgy - Ite, Missa est, literally "Go, it is the dismissal", translated idiomatically in the current English Roman Missal as "Go forth, the Mass is ended." The Catholic church stresses the importance of liturgical formation, through which participants are given a knowledge and understanding of the liturgical action in which they are involved.

The Eastern Orthodox Church (Byzantine Rite) uses the term "Divine Liturgy" to denote the Eucharistic service, and some Oriental Orthodox churches also use that term, along with the Eastern Lutheran Churches and the Eastern Catholic Churches.

The descendant churches of the Church of the East and various other Syriac Churches call their Liturgy the Holy Qurbana, meaning "Holy Offering".

Mass is the common term used in the Lutheran Churches in Europe but more often referred to as the Divine Service, Holy Communion, or the Holy Eucharist in North America. Lutherans retained and utilized much of the Roman Catholic Mass since the early modifications by Martin Luther. The general order of the Mass and many of the various aspects remain similar between the two traditions. Latin titles for the sections, psalms, and days has been widely retained, but more recent reforms have omitted this. Recently, certain Lutherans have adapted much of their revised Mass to coincide with the reforms and language changes brought about by post-Vatican II changes.

Anglicans variably use Holy Communion, The Lord’s Supper, the Roman Catholic/Lutheran term Mass or Holy Eucharist, depending upon their churchmanship.

Other Protestant traditions, such as the Reformed and Methodist denominations, vary in their liturgies or "orders of worship" (as they are commonly called). Other traditions in the west often called "Mainline" have benefited from the Liturgical Movement which flowered in the mid/late 20th century. Over the course of the past several decades, these Protestant traditions have developed remarkably similar patterns of liturgy, drawing from ancient sources as the paradigm for developing proper liturgical expressions. Of great importance to these traditions has been a recovery of a unified pattern of Word and Sacrament in Lord's Day liturgy.

Many other Protestant Christian traditions (such as the Pentecostal/Charismatics, Assembly of God, and non-denominational churches), while often following a fixed "order of worship", tend to have liturgical practices that vary from those of the broader Christian tradition.

==== Commonalities ====
There are common elements found in most Western liturgical churches, including the Catholic and Lutheran traditions, as well as certain Reformed, Anglican and Methodist denominations. These include:

- The Procession with the cross, followed by the other acolytes, the deacons and the priest
- The Invocation (beginning with the Sign of the Cross)
- Confession at the foot of the altar
- Absolution
- Introit, Psalms, Hymns, chants
- Litany
- Kyrie and Gloria
- Salutation
- Collect
- Liturgical Readings (call and response)
- Alleluia Verse and other responses

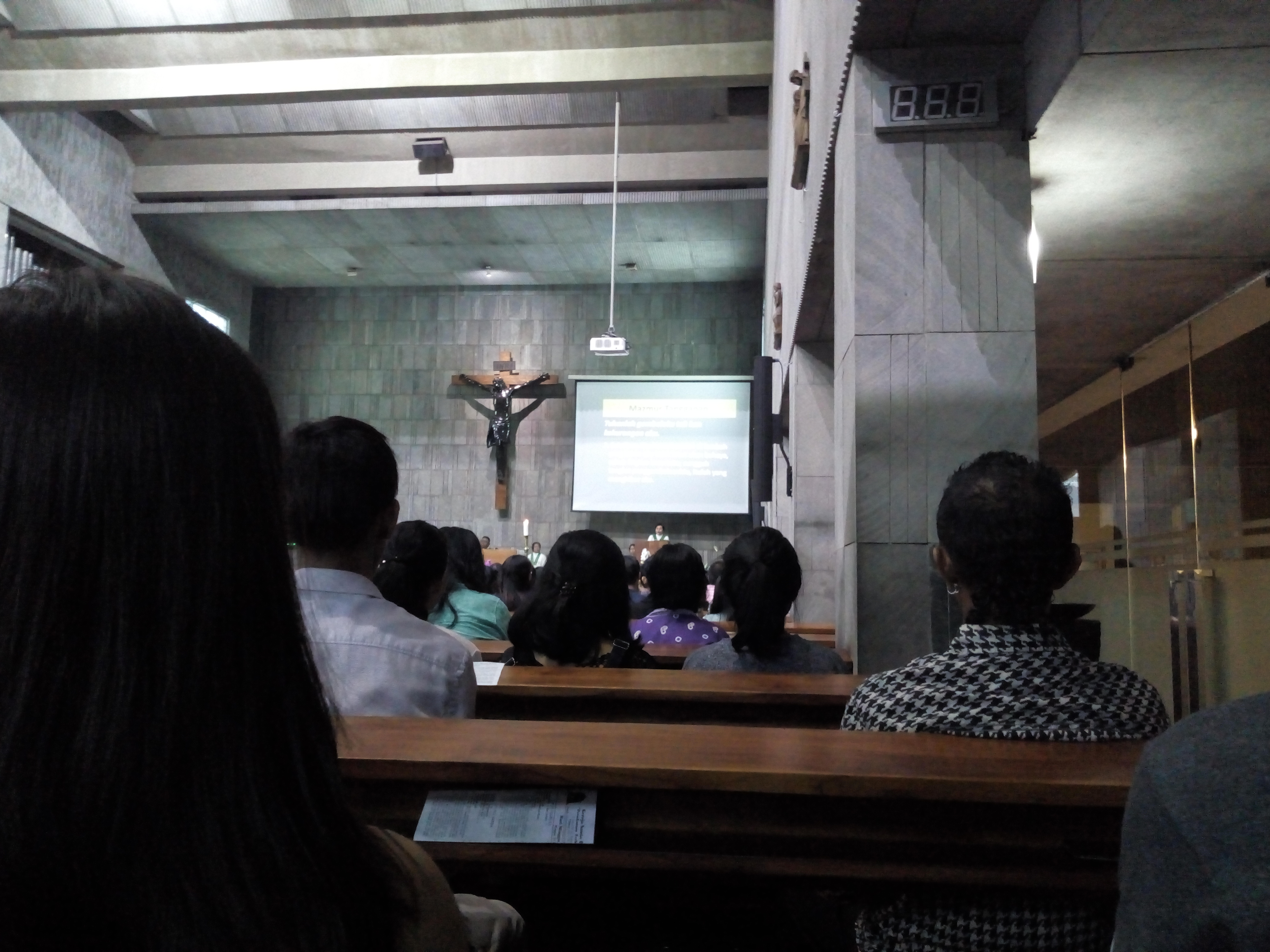
Scripture readings at Gereja Santa, Indonesia

- Scripture readings, culminating in a reading from one of the Gospels.
- The Creed
- The Prayers
- The Lord's Prayer
- Commemoration of the Saints and prayers for the faithful departed.
- Intercessory prayers for the church and its leadership, and often, for earthly rulers.
- Incense
- Offering
- A division between the first half of the liturgy, open to both church members and those wanting to learn about the church, and the second half, the celebration of the Eucharist proper, open only to baptized believers in good standing with the church.
- The Consecration
- The Offertory Prayer
- Communion
- Sanctus prayer as part of the anaphora
- A three-fold dialogue between priest and people at the beginning of the anaphora or eucharistic prayer
- An anaphora, eucharistic canon, "great thanksgiving", canon or "hallowing", said by the priest in the name of all present, in order to consecrate the bread and wine as the Body and Blood of Christ.
- A prayer to God the Father, usually invoking the Holy Spirit, asking that the bread and wine become, or be manifested as, the body and blood of Christ.
- Expressions within the anaphora which indicate that sacrifice is being offered in remembrance of Christ's crucifixion.
- A section of the anaphora which asks that those who receive communion may be blessed thereby, and often, that they may be preserved in the faith until the end of their lives
- The Peace or "Passing of the Peace"
- Agnus Dei
- Benediction

=== Divine office ===
The term "Divine Office" describes the practice of "marking the hours of each day and sanctifying the day with prayer".

In the Western Catholic Church, there are multiple forms of the office. The Liturgy of the Hours is the official form of the office used throughout the Latin Church, but many other forms exist including the Little Office of the Blessed Virgin Mary, the forms of the office specific to various religious orders, and the Roman Breviary which was Standard before the Second Vatican Council, to name a few. There were eight such hours, corresponding to certain times of the day: Matins (sometimes called Vigil), Lauds, Prime, Terce, Sext, None, Vespers, and Compline. The Second Vatican Council ordered the suppression of Prime.

In monasteries, Matins was generally celebrated before dawn, or sometimes over the course of a night; Lauds at the end of Matins, generally at the break of day; Prime at 6 AM; Terce at 9AM; Sext at noon; None at 3PM; Vespers at the rising of the Vespers or Evening Star (usually about 6PM); and Compline was said at the end of the day, generally right before bed time.

The offices are maintained in Lutheran prayer books (such as The Brotherhood Prayerbook) and hymnals. A common practice among Lutherans in America is to pray the offices mid-week during Advent and Lent. The office of Compline is also found in some older Lutheran worship books and more typically used in monasteries and seminaries.

In Anglican churches, the offices were combined into two offices: Morning Prayer and Evening Prayer, the latter sometimes known as Evensong. In more recent years, the Anglicans have added the offices of Noonday and Compline to Morning and Evening Prayer as part of the Book of Common Prayer. The Anglican Breviary, containing 8 full offices, is not the official liturgy of the Anglican Church.

The Byzantine Rite maintains a daily cycle of seven non-sacramental services:

- Vespers (Gk. Hesperinos) at sunset commences the liturgical day
- Compline (Gk. Apodeipnou, "after supper")
- Midnight Office (Gk. mesonyktikon)
- Matins (Gk. Orthros), ending at dawn (in theory; in practice, the time varies greatly)
- The First Hour
- The Third and Sixth Hours
- The Ninth Hour

The sundry Canonical Hours are, in practice, grouped together into aggregates so that there are three major times of prayer a day: Evening, Morning and Midday; for details, see Canonical hours — Aggregates.

Great Vespers, as it is termed in the Byzantine Rite, is an extended vespers service used on the eve of a major Feast day, or in conjunction with the divine liturgy, or certain other special occasions.

In the Maronite Church's liturgies, the office is arranged so that the liturgical day begins at sundown. The first office of the day is the evening office of Ramsho, followed by the night office of Sootoro, concluding with the morning office of Safro. In the Maronite Eparchies of the United States, the approved breviary set is titled the Prayer of the Faithful.

== See also ==
- Anglican devotions
- Apostolic Tradition
- List of Catholic rites and churches
