= Blok M, Jakarta =

Shopping and entertainment quarter in Jakarta, Indonesia

Coordinates: 6.244554°S 106.800676°E

Blok M
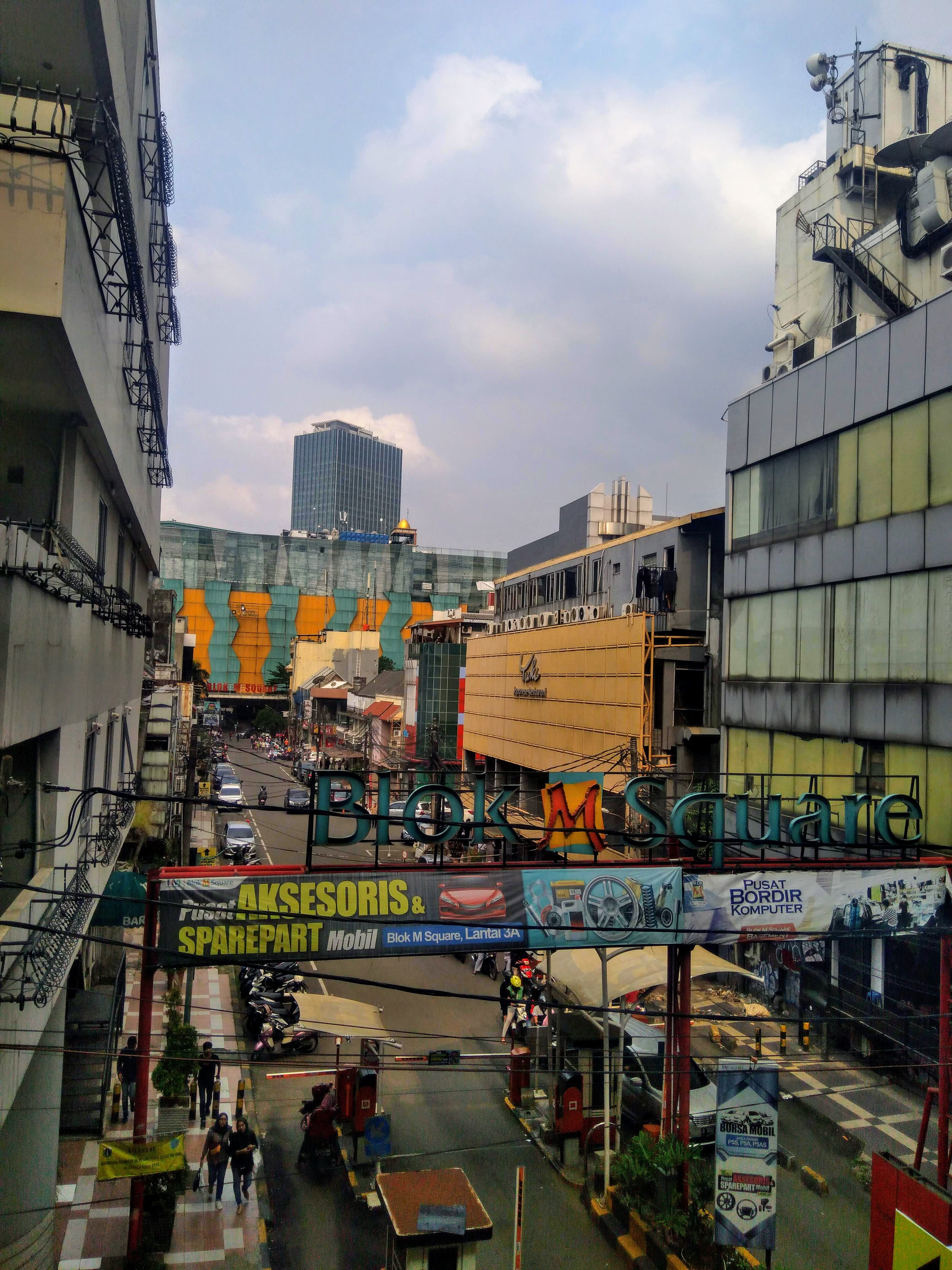
- Little Tokyo, Blok M
- Interactive map of Blok M
- Country: Indonesia
- Province: Jakarta
- Administrative city: South Jakarta
- District: Kebayoran Baru

Blok M is a business, shopping and nightlife quarter located in Kebayoran Baru, South Jakarta, Indonesia. It runs east from Iskandarsyah Road to Bulungan Road in the west, and north from Falatehan Road to Melawai Road in the south. An area within Blok M also hosts Jakarta's 'Little Tokyo'.

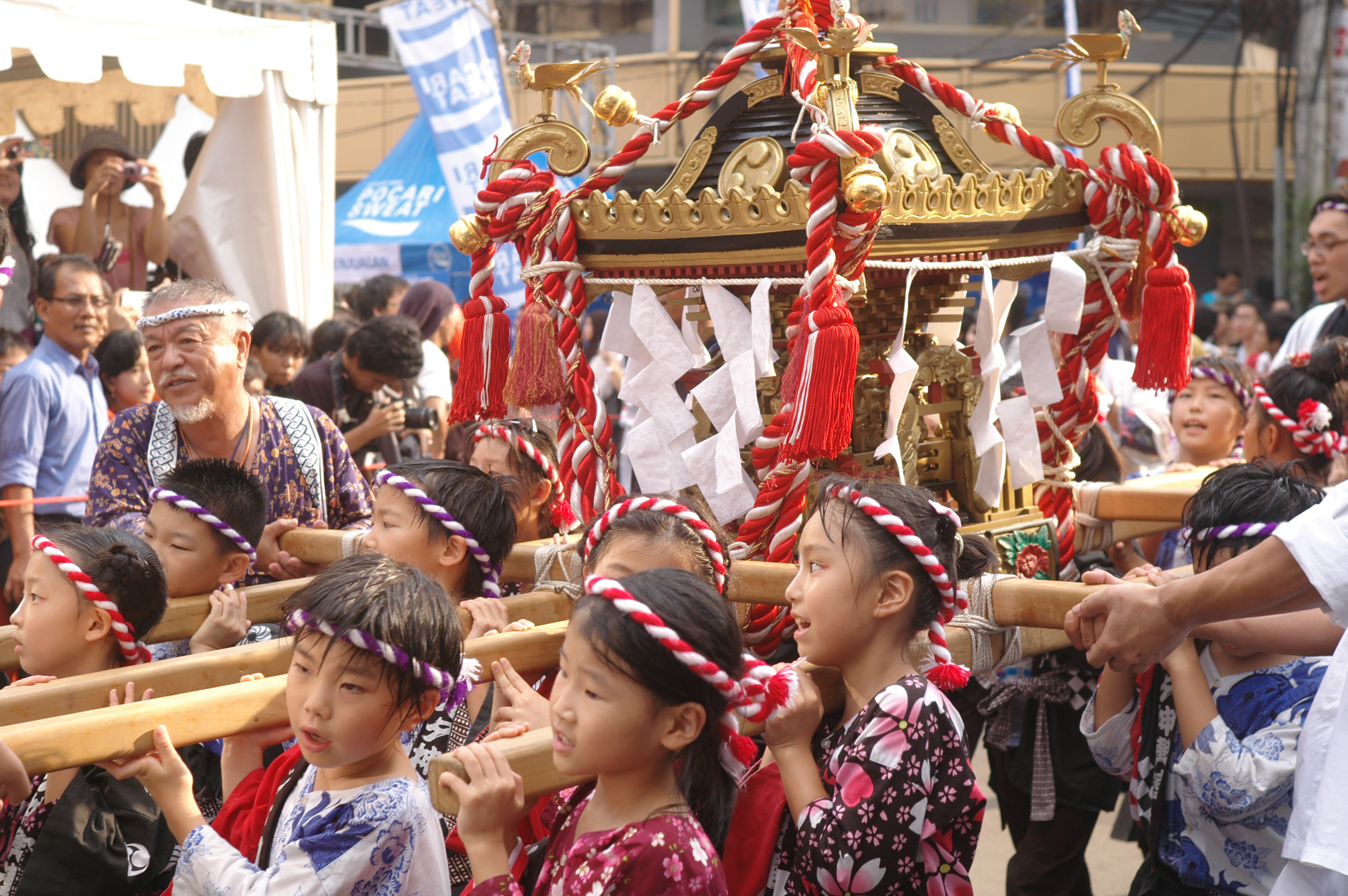
Mikoshi Parade (Mikoshi Kids), Ennichisai festival

== History ==
Blok M is part of the Kebayoran Baru district, which is subdivided into sections named from Blok A to Blok S. Originally conceived by the Dutch colonial government in 1938 as a satellite city of Batavia (now Jakarta), the development of Kebayoran Baru was delayed for a decade due to war and political instability.

The project was finally initiated in 1948, based on a master plan by architect Mohammad Soesilo, a student of Thomas Karsten, the designer of urban plans for Malang, Bandung, and Bogor. To implement the project, the Dutch government partnered with Centrale Stichting Wederopbouw (CSW, Central Foundation for Reconstruction), a contractor already involved in several other construction projects in and around Jakarta. CSW established its own headquarters in the area, at what is now known as the CSW intersection. In 1951, control of the Kebayoran Baru project was transferred from Dutch authorities to an agency under Indonesia’s Ministry of Public Works.

The development, which included the displacement of rural villages, farmland, plantations, and livestock areas, eventually covered around seven square kilometers. By 1953, Kebayoran Baru began functioning as a planned garden city intended to accommodate up to 100,000 residents while remaining integrated with Jakarta. The district was equipped with schools, traditional markets, residential areas, green spaces, an organized road network, offices, and a transit terminal. Located at the center of this development, Blok M was envisioned as a hub for economic activity and urban mobility. In the 1970s, the opening of Pasar Raya Blok M marked the emergence of modern retail in the district, followed by Aldiron Plaza. Blok M reached its peak popularity during the 1980s and early 1990s, with the construction of new shopping centers such as Blok M Plaza and the underground Mal Blok M within the bus terminal, which connected the terminal to surrounding areas. The district also became home to a growing Japanese expatriate community, giving rise to "Little Tokyo", an enclave of Japanese restaurants, cafés, supermarkets, and entertainment venues. During its heyday, Blok M also emerged as a hub of pop culture. Its vibrant atmosphere was captured in the film Blok M (Bakal Lokasi Mejeng), starring Paramitha Rusady and Desy Ratnasari, and inspired songs like “Jalan-jalan Sore” by Denny Malik, “JJS Lintas Melawai” by Hari Moekti, and “Lintas Melawai” by Karimata.

Blok M began to decline toward the late 1990s due to the Asian financial crisis and the rise of modern shopping malls in other parts of Jakarta. Throughout the 2000s and late 2010s, its role was largely reduced to serving as a public transportation hub for buses and minivans, even after an MRT station nearby was opened in 2019.

To revive Blok M's main role as an economic hub, the government has initiated some revitalization efforts throughout the 2020s, such as renovating the Martha Christina Tiahahu Park near Blok M Plaza, refurbish the heavily-declined underground Mal Blok M – later renamed as Blok M Hub, and enhance public transit and pedestrian access while opening new Transjakarta feeder bus routes from Jakarta's outskirts. As the result, Blok M's popularity has significantly revived; many people from inside and outside Jakarta flocked again into the quarter on weekends and holidays and many restaurants here competing to offer unique and viral culinaries. Governor of Jakarta, Pramono Anung, during his address on the reinauguration of Blok M Hub in 2025 has envisioned Blok M as "the ASEAN economic and creative hub that never sleeps."

== Shopping ==
Blok M Hub (formerly Mal Blok M) is the main shopping portion of the quarter, built on the terminal basement since 1993. The mall was known for having low prices, but bargaining was considered a requirement. Mal Blok M had suffered a significant decline due to the COVID-19 pandemic. A refurbishment in 2025 sought the revival of Mal Blok M's glory years in the 1990s and the 2000s. Mal Blok M was reinaugurated as the Blok M Hub on 25 May 2025 after the refurbishment, now focused as a culinary center.

Blok M Square, Blok M Plaza and Pasaraya Blok M are the main shopping centres in Blok M. Built in 1992, the Plaza is a modern luxury mall and second of its kind in Jakarta after Plaza Indonesia. Blok M Square was built in 2008 on the former site of Aldiron Plaza, which hosts fashion tenants and a second-hand book market originating from Kwitang. Pasaraya Blok M is a department store run by Abdul Latief. Its two contiguous buildings used to include a large food court and a supermarket in the basement with international standard and corresponding prices. The mall also houses the headquarters of Gojek. Currently, Pasaraya is still suffering long-time significant decline since the pandemic, making it nearly empty and closed.

Part of Blok M Square is known as Little Tokyo from its collection of Japanese restaurants, food stalls, karaoke bars and massage parlours.

== Clubs and cafés ==
There are several cafés, Karaoke, massage parlour within the area. Jalan Melawai, which is known as Little Tokyo has many Japanese style restaurants, bars and cafés. Jalan Falatehan also has many cafés, bars and massage parlors.

== M Bloc Space ==
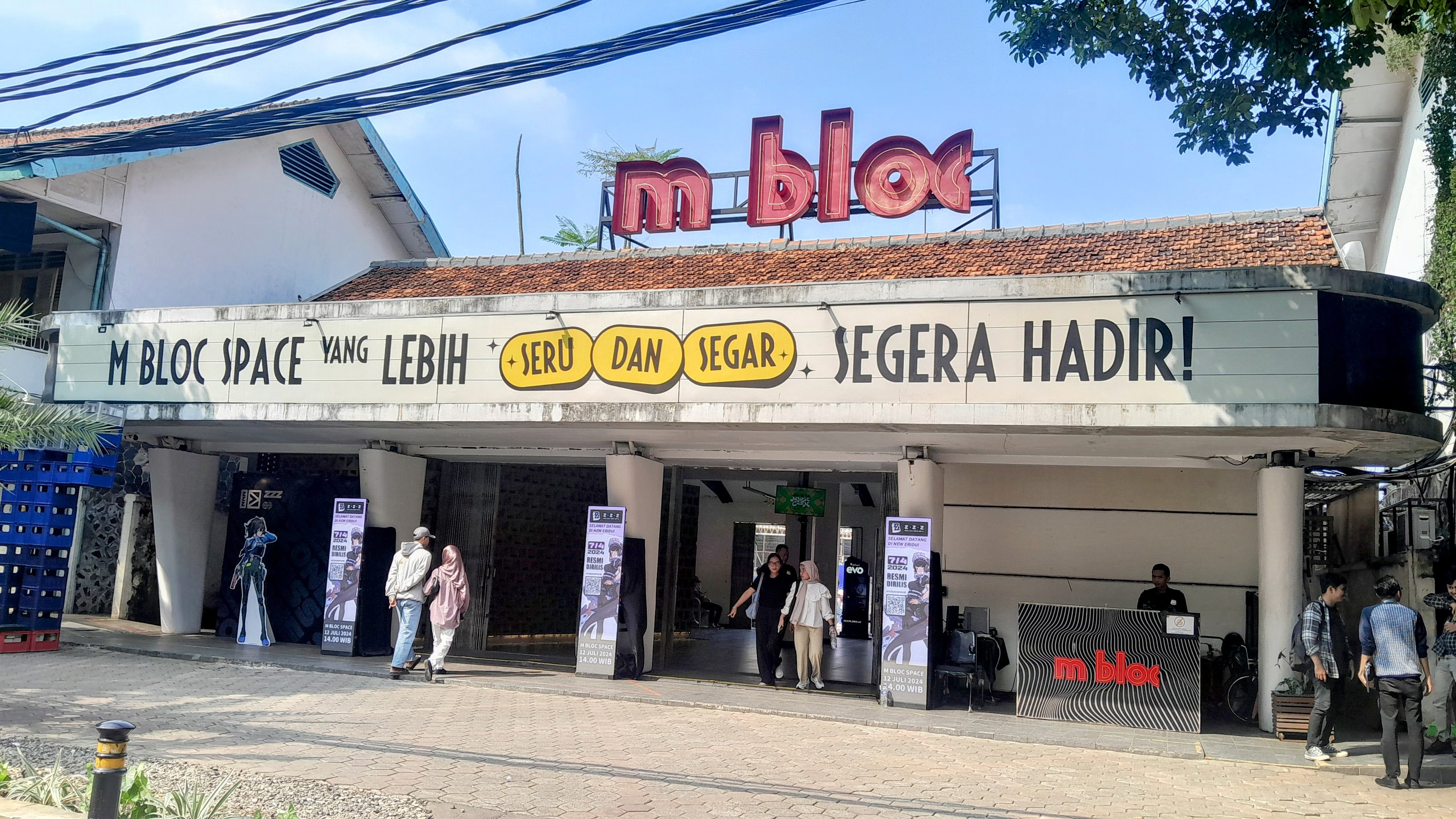
The front of M Bloc Space

M Bloc Space is a creative complex, which was previously an abandoned housing complex owned by Perum Peruri. The place has music venue, trendy restaurants, coffee shops, bar, beauty clinic, record store, museum, gallery and community hall. The M Bloc Market is an eco-friendly market for small businesses products, such as coffee, fruits and vegetables. It's a popular hangout place, specially among youngsters.

== Transportation ==
Blok M has the largest bus stations in Jakarta, which many Transjakarta (via its Blok M bus station) buses depart from. The area is also served by Jakarta MRT with the Blok M BCA MRT station which directly connects to Blok M Plaza.

== See also ==
- Kebayoran Baru
- Kemang, Jakarta
- Pasar Baru
