= Jalan Jenderal Gatot Subroto =

Road in Indonesia

- Jalan Gatot Subroto
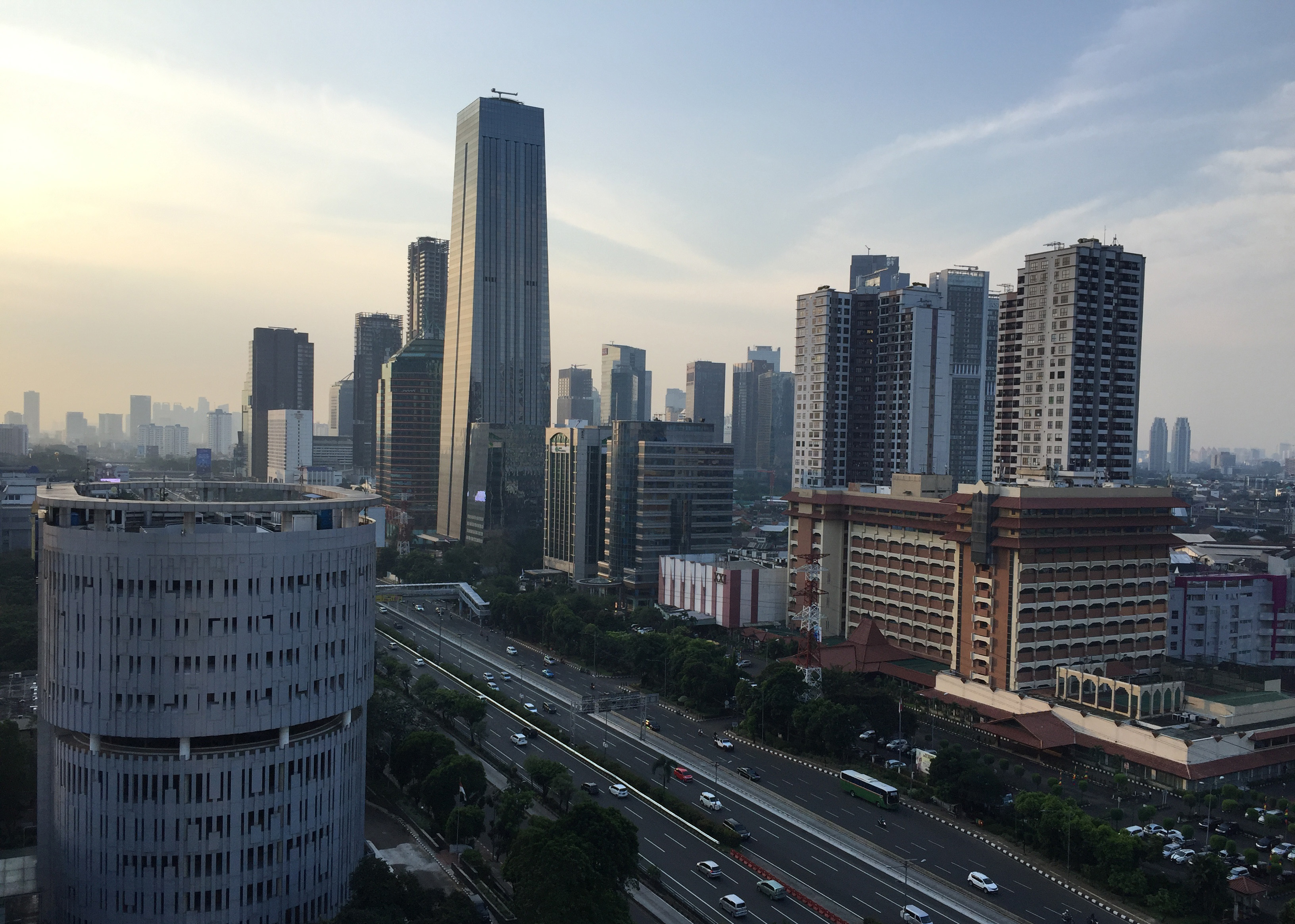
- Jalan Jenderal Gatot Subroto seen from the Telkom Landmark Complex (2018)
- Owner: Government of Special Region of Jakarta
- Maintained by: Office of Public Works (Dinas Pekerjaan Umum) of Special Region of Jakarta
- Length: 6.98 km (4.34 mi)
- Location: South Jakarta and Central Jakarta
- Nearest metro station: Bendungan Hilir, Istora Mandiri
- South end: Dirgantara statue
- North-West end: Slipi, Central Jakarta

Jalan Jenderal Gatot Subroto (Gatot Subroto Avenue) is one of the major roads in Jakarta, Indonesia. The road starts from Dirgantara statue in South Jakarta, which crosses 10 administrative villages and ends at Slipi, Central Jakarta. The road is named after National Hero of Indonesia General Gatot Subroto. The road was constructed in 1960s. The road runs parallel with Jakarta Inner Ring Road. The location of the road is within the Golden Triangle CBD of Jakarta. Many important office buildings and skyscrapers are situated along the road.

== Major buildings in the Gatot Subroto Road ==
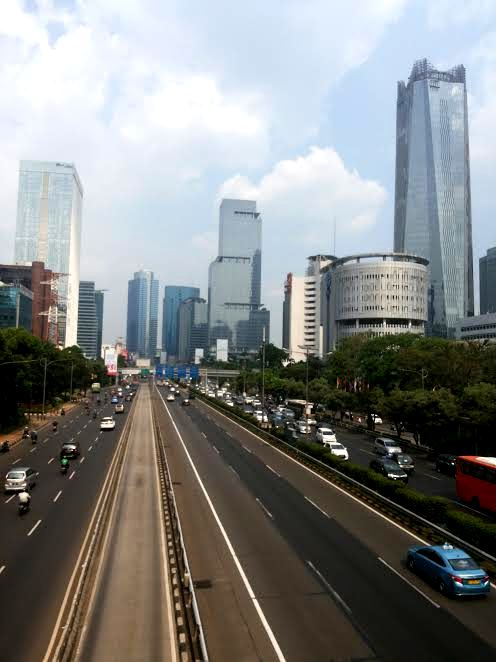
Few of the skyscrapers of Jalan Jenderal Gatot Subroto

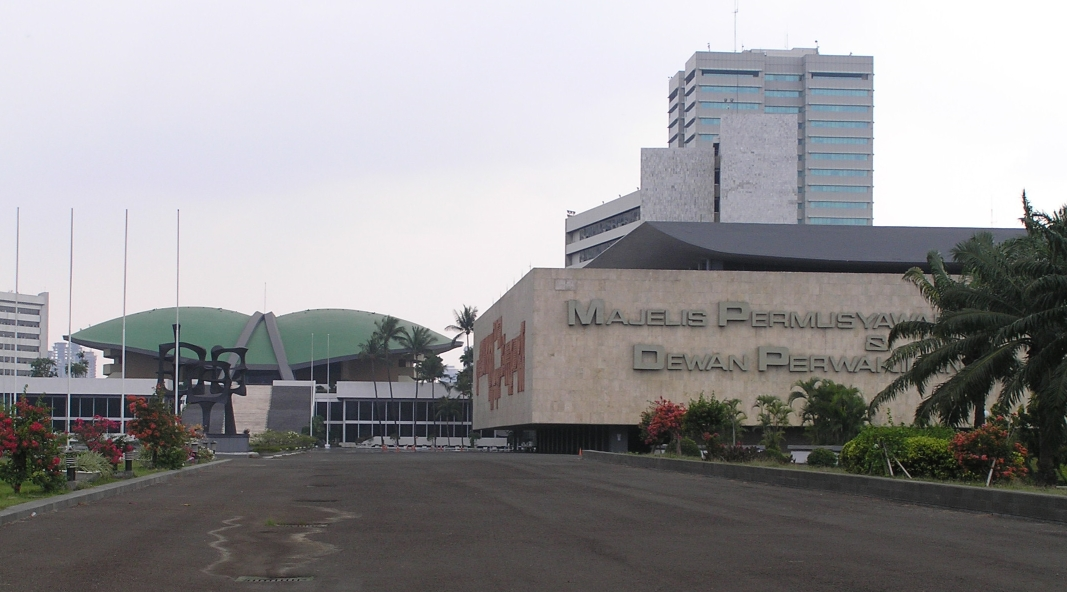
The Indonesian Parliament Building is also located at the Gatot Subroto Road

Sorted from east to west
Northeast/North	Southwest/South	
Dirgantara Monument Intersection (to Prof. Dr. Soepomo Street (north), MT Haryono Street (east), and Pasar Minggu (south)
Graha Mustika Ratu	Aldiron Football Field	
Kospin Jasa	Aldiron Football Field	
Menara Bidakara	Aldiron Football Field	
All Fresh Pancoran	Greater Jakarta LRT Project area	
TMStudio67	Greater Jakarta LRT Project area	
Samara Suites Gatot Subroto, Hachi Grill Gatot Subroto	T Tower	
Shell Gas Station	Telkom SME Center	
Menara BRIlian (Bank Rakyat Indonesia (BRI))	Smesco Indonesia	
Rumah Pangan Kita	Indonesian Red Cross Society	
K-Link Tower	Indonesian Red Cross Society	
Medistra Hospital	Empty	
Medistra Hospital	Paramadina University	
Medistra Hospital	Krating Daeng Indonesia	
Intersection to Kapten Tendean Street (Head office of Trans TV)
Embassy of South Korea	Mercure Hotel Jakarta Gatot Subroto	
Graha Surveyor Indonesia	Mercure Hotel Jakarta Gatot Subroto	
Trans Park Marketing Gallery	Mercure Hotel Jakarta Gatot Subroto	
Wisma Baja	Mercure Hotel Jakarta Gatot Subroto	
Ministry of Industry	Gayanti City	
Ministry of Manpower	Empty	
Energy and Mineral Resources Human Resources Development Agency of the Ministry of Energy and Mineral Resources	Empty	
Head office of Indonesian Bureau of Logistics	Empty	
Head Office of Indonesia Power	Empty	
PT. Artha Daya Coalindo	Empty	
Kuningan Intersection (to Mampang Prapatan Street and HR Rasuna Said Street)
Best Argo International	Empty	
Dinas Pendidikan Provinsi DKI Jakarta	Empty	
Dinas Pendidikan Provinsi DKI Jakarta	Palm Court Apartements	
Balai Kartini	The Ocura Residences Jakarta	
Balai Kartini	The Job Market Center of Ministry of Manpower (Gedung Awal Oedin Djamin)	
Commodity Square	Wisma Mulia 1	
Patra Jasa	Wisma Mulia 2 (Embassy of Brazil and Venezuela)	
Pertamina Gas Station	Menara Jamsostek	
Empty	Empty	
Menara Global (Head office of IDN, IDN Times, and JKT48)	Capital Place Jakarta (Office of Meta Indonesia), Four Seasons Hotel Jakarta	
Centennial Tower	Satriamandala Museum (The Indonesian National Armed Forces History Center)	
Graha BIP	Telkom Landmark Complex (Head Office of Telkom Indonesia and Telkomsel)	
Wisma Argo Manunggal	Telkom Landmark Complex (Head Office of Telkom Indonesia and Telkomsel)	
Mitra Terrace, Graha Mitra (Head office of Indika Group)	Telkom Landmark Complex (Head Office of Telkom Indonesia and Telkomsel)	
Kartika Chandra Hotel	Indonesian Institute of Sciences (merged to the National Research and Innovation Agency)	
Gedung BPJS Ketenagakerjaan	Ministry of Investment/Investment Coordinating Board	Sudirman Central Business District (SCBD)
The Tower by Alam Sutra (Head office of Bank Syariah Indonesia)	Directorate General of Taxes of the Ministry of Finance	Sudirman Central Business District (SCBD)
Menara Mulia	Plaza Mandiri (Head office of Bank Mandiri)	Sudirman Central Business District (SCBD)
Wisma UIC	Greater Jakarta Metropolitan Regional Police Headquarters	Sudirman Central Business District (SCBD)
Yamaha Music Center Building	Greater Jakarta Metropolitan Regional Police Headquarters	Sudirman Central Business District (SCBD)
Artotel Suites Mangkuluhur	Greater Jakarta Metropolitan Regional Police Headquarters	Sudirman Central Business District (SCBD)
Mangkuluhur City	Greater Jakarta Metropolitan Regional Police Headquarters	Sudirman Central Business District (SCBD)
The Plaza Semanggi	Greater Jakarta Metropolitan Regional Police Headquarters	Sudirman Central Business District (SCBD)
Semanggi Interchange (Intersection with Jenderal Sudirman Road)
Wisma GKBI ( Embassy of South Africa)	The Sultan Hotel & Residence Jakarta	Gelora Bung Karno Sports Complex
Empty	Jakarta Convention Center	Gelora Bung Karno Sports Complex
Park Royale Executive Suites	Jakarta Convention Center	Gelora Bung Karno Sports Complex
Intersection with the Gerbang Pemuda Street
Graha Jalapuspita	Senayan Park (SPARK) Shopping Mall	
Residential area	National Parliament Complex (People's Consultative Assembly/People's Representative Council/Regional Representative Council Building)	
Audit Board of Indonesia	National Parliament Complex (People's Consultative Assembly/People's Representative Council/Regional Representative Council Building)	
Audit Board of Indonesia	Ministry of Environment and Forestry	
Audit Board of Indonesia	Manggala Wanabakti	
Pejompongan Intersection (to East Palmerah Street (Jalan Palmerah Timur) and Jalan Pejompongan Raya)

- West : GP Plaza
- East : Jakarta Design Center, Dipo Business Center, Bangun Tjipta, Apartemen Semanggi, BNI Corporate University

Slipi Intersection (towards Jalan Palmerah Utara and Jalan Aipda KS Tubun)

== Intersections ==
The road has 7 intersections,

- At Digantara statue towards Kasablanka and Kalibata Heroes' Cemetery;
- towards southwest to Kapten Tendean Street (head office of Trans TV);
- towards HR Rasuna Said Street and Pasar Minggu;
- At Semanggi Interchange towards Jalan Jenderal Sudirman and Senayan;
- Adjacent to Gelora Bung Karno Stadium towards Senayan;
- towards east adjacent to Pejompongan.
- towards Palmerah Utara Road and Jalan Aipda KS Tubun

== Transportation ==
=== Bus routes ===
==== Transjakarta ====
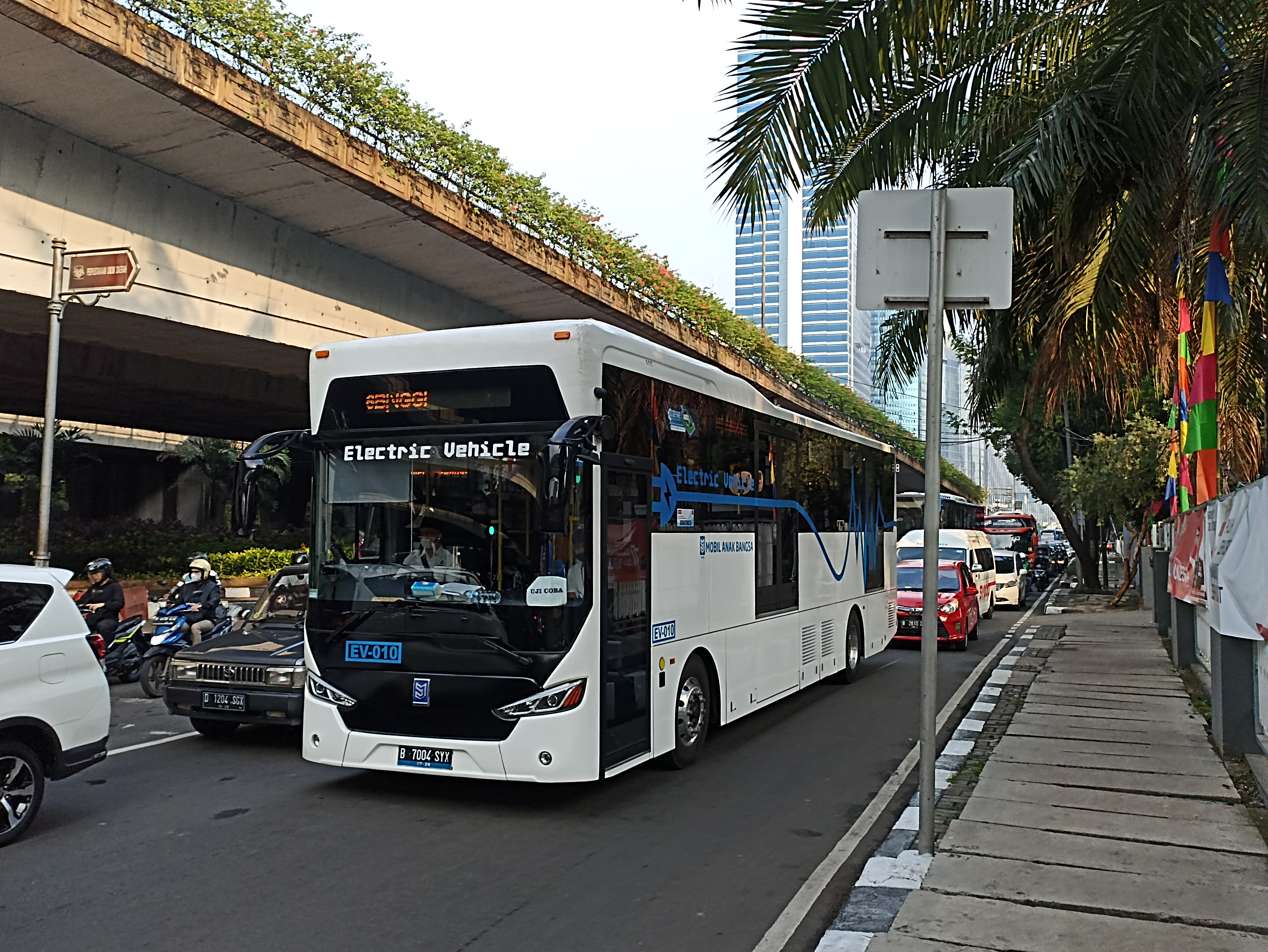
The Transjakarta electric bus trial at the Gatot Subroto Street

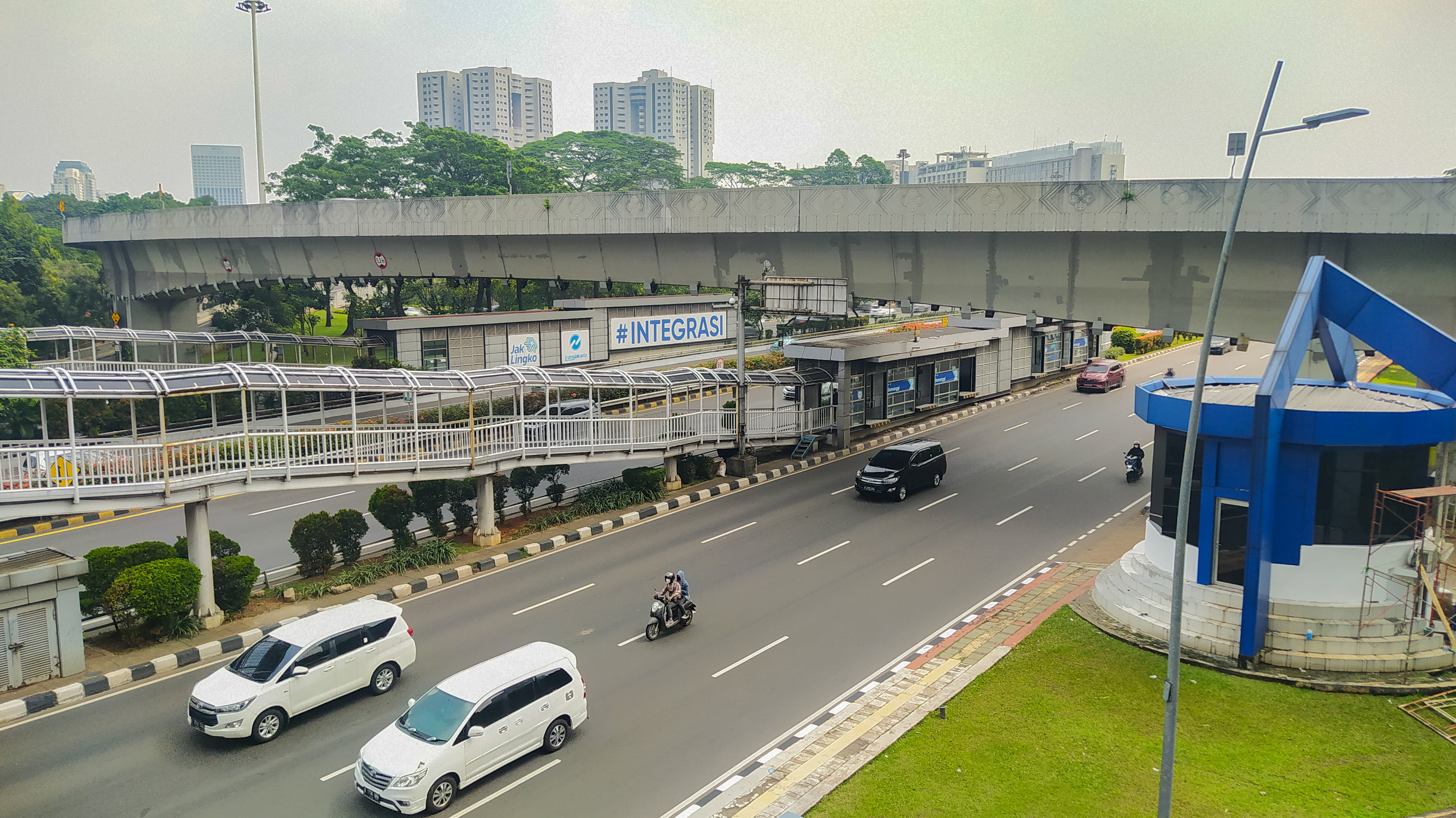
The Semanggi Transjakarta bus shelter at the Semanggi Interchange

There are eight bus stops for the Transjakarta BRT along Jalan Jenderal Gatot Subroto, mainly serving for Corridor 9. They are:

- Pancoran, near Smesco Indonesia
- Tegal Parang, near Mercure Hotel Jakarta Gatot Subroto and the head office of Ministry of Industry
- Simpang Kuningan, near the intersection with the Mampang Prapatan Street and HR Rasuna Said Street
- Denpasar, at the front of Menara Jamsostek
- Widya Chandra Telkomsel, in front of the office of the Indonesian Institute of Sciences
- Semanggi, located at the Semanggi Interchange
- Gerbang Pemuda, at the front of the Jakarta Convention Center
- Petamburan, at the front of Jakarta Design Center

Transjakarta bus routes that serves this road are:

- Corridor (Ragunan–Balai Kota via Semanggi)
- Corridor (Pinang Ranti–Pluit)
- Corridor (PGC–Grogol Reformasi)
- Corridor (Pinang Ranti-Bundaran Senayan)
- Corridor 13C (Puri Beta–Dukuh Atas)

==== Other Buses ====
Apart from Transjakarta, here are the lists of public transportation routes that serves the Gatot Subroto Street:

- Kopaja S602 Tanah Abang-Ragunan (via Komdak - Casablanca)
- Kopaja S612 Kampung Melayu-Ragunan (via Mampang - Kemang Timur)
- Kopaja S13 Ragunan-Grogol
- Kopaja S66 Blok M-Manggarai
- Koantas Bima P102 Tanah Abang-Ciputat
- Kowanbisata T512 Pulo Gadung-Ciputat
- Metromini S640 Pasar Minggu-Tanah Abang
- PPD AC10 Kampung Rambutan-Dukuh Atas
- PPD AC17 Dukuh Atas-Bekasi (via Bulak Kapal)
- PPD AC80 Kampung Rambutan-Blok M
- PPD P45 Blok M-Poris Plawad
- PPD P54 Grogol-Depok
- PPD 45 Cililitan-Blok M
- PPD 213 Grogol-Kampung Melayu
- AJA P AC119 Kampung Melayu-Poris Plawad
- AJA P AC138 Blok M-Poris Plawad
- Mayasari Bakti P02A Kampung Rambutan-Kalideres (via Komdak - Slipi - Grogol - Tomang - UKI - Ps. Rebo)
- Mayasari Bakti P55 Kampung Rambutan-Grogol (via Komdak - Slipi - Tomang - UKI - Ps. Rebo)
- Mayasari Bakti R57 Pulo Gadung-Blok M (via Mampang - Pancoran - UKI - Bypass - Pemuda)
- Mayasari Bakti AC02 Kampung Rambutan-Kalideres (via Komdak - Slipi - Grogol - Tomang - Tol - Ps. Rebo)
- Mayasari Bakti AC02A Kampung Rambutan-Kalideres (via Slipi - Grogol - Tomang - Tol - Ps. Rebo)
- Mayasari Bakti AC05 Blok M-Bekasi (via Polda - Komdak - Jatibening - Bekasi Barat)
- Mayasari Bakti AC05 Blok M-Bekasi (via Polda - Komdak - Bekasi Timur)
- Mayasari Bakti AC05A Blok M-Kota Harapan Indah (via Polda - Komdak - Jatibening - GOR Bekasi - Perumnas 1 - Kranji)
- Mayasari Bakti AC34 Blok M-Poris Plawad (via Slipi - Polda - Kebon Jeruk - Karawaci)
- Mayasari Bakti AC42A Kalideres-Cileungsi (via Daan Mogot - Grogol - Tomang - Slipi - Komdak - Tol - Cibubur)
- Mayasari Bakti AC49 Blok M-Tanjung Priok (via Slipi - Polda - Grogol - Tomang - Slipi)
- Mayasari Bakti AC52 Tanah Abang-Bekasi (via Komdak - Sudirman - Thamrin - Jatibening - Bekasi Timur)
- Mayasari Bakti AC52A Tanah Abang-Jatiasih (via Komdak - Sudirman - Thamrin - Jatibening - Tol JORR)
- Mayasari Bakti AC62 Senen-Poris Plawad (via Sudirman - Thamrin - Slipi - Kebon Jeruk - Karawaci)
- Mayasari Bakti AC70 Tanah Abang-Kampung Rambutan (via Komdak - Sudirman - Thamrin - Tol - UKI)
- Mayasari Bakti AC70A Tanah Abang-Cileungsi (via Komdak - Sudirman - Thamrin - Cibubur)
- Mayasari Bakti AC81 Kalideres-Depok (via Daan Mogot - Grogol - Tomang - Slipi - Komdak - Pancoran - Ps. Minggu - Lt. Agung)
- Mayasari Bakti AC121 Blok M-Cikarang (via Komdak - Polda - Jatibening - Cikarang Barat)
- Mayasari Bakti AC121A Blok M-Jababeka (via Komdak - Polda - Jatibening - Cikarang Barat)
- DAMRI: Plaza Blok M—Soekarno-Hatta Airport
- DAMRI: Lebak Bulus—Soekarno-Hatta Airport

=== Train Lines ===
==== Jabodebek LRT ====
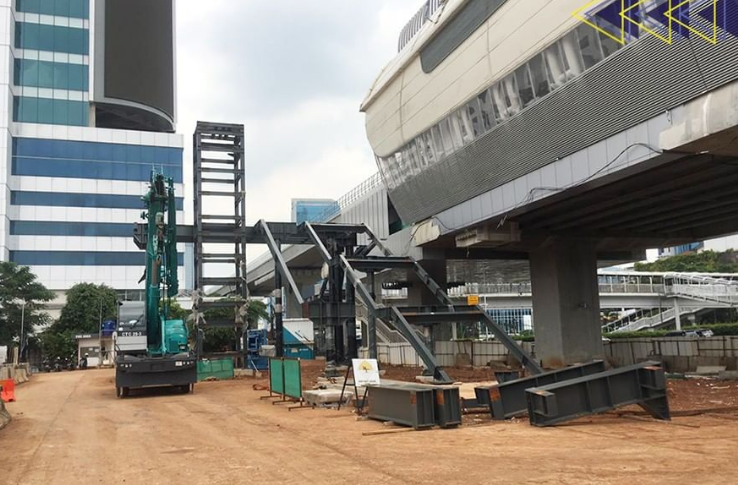
The Pancoran LRT Station is the only Greater Jakarta LRT station at the Gatot Subroto Street

The Gatot Subroto Street is also served by the Cibubur and Bekasi Line of the Greater Jakarta LRT. There's only one station

- Pancoran Station

== Gallery ==
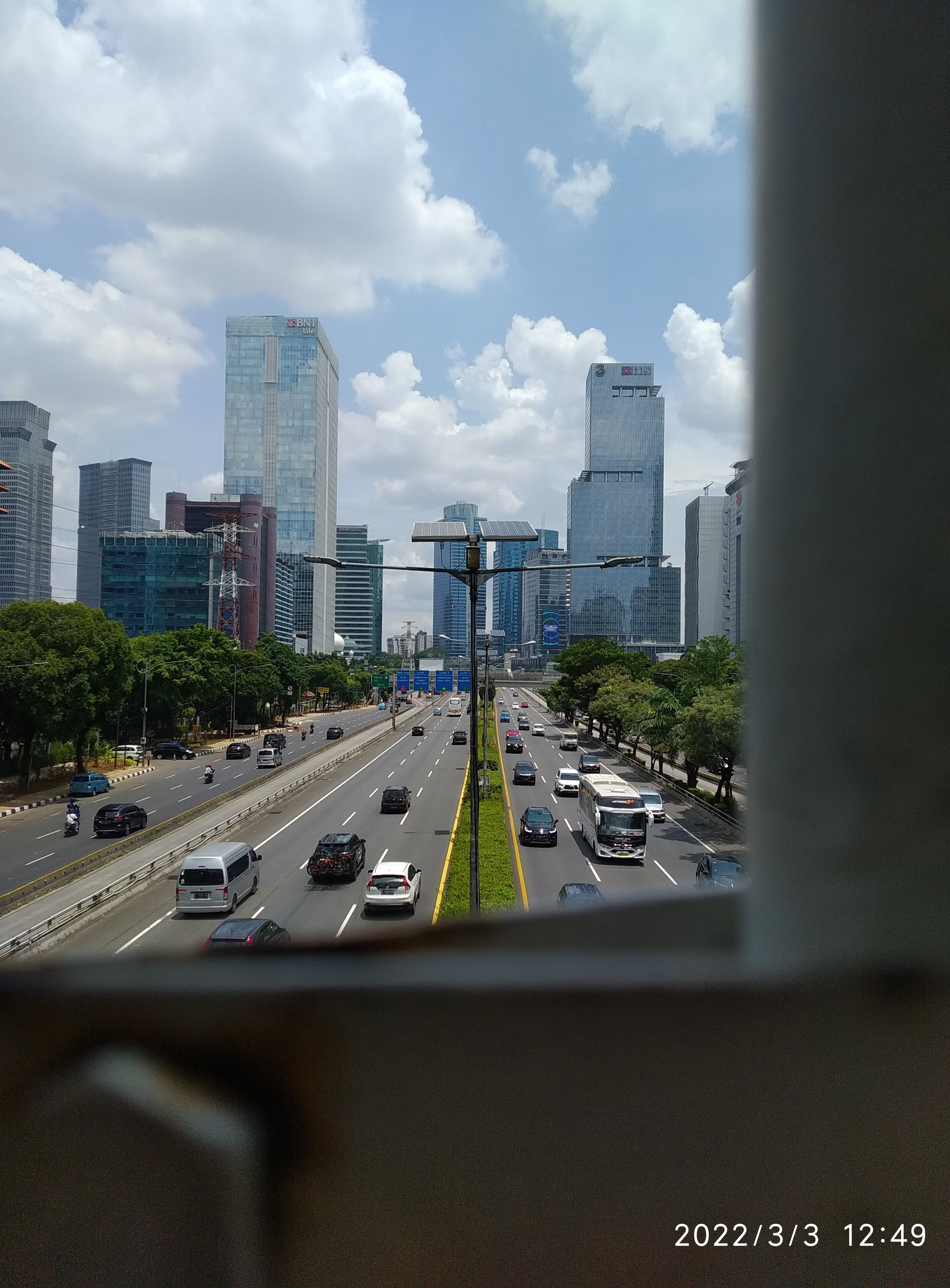
The whole part of the road is riven by the Jakarta Inner Ring Road.

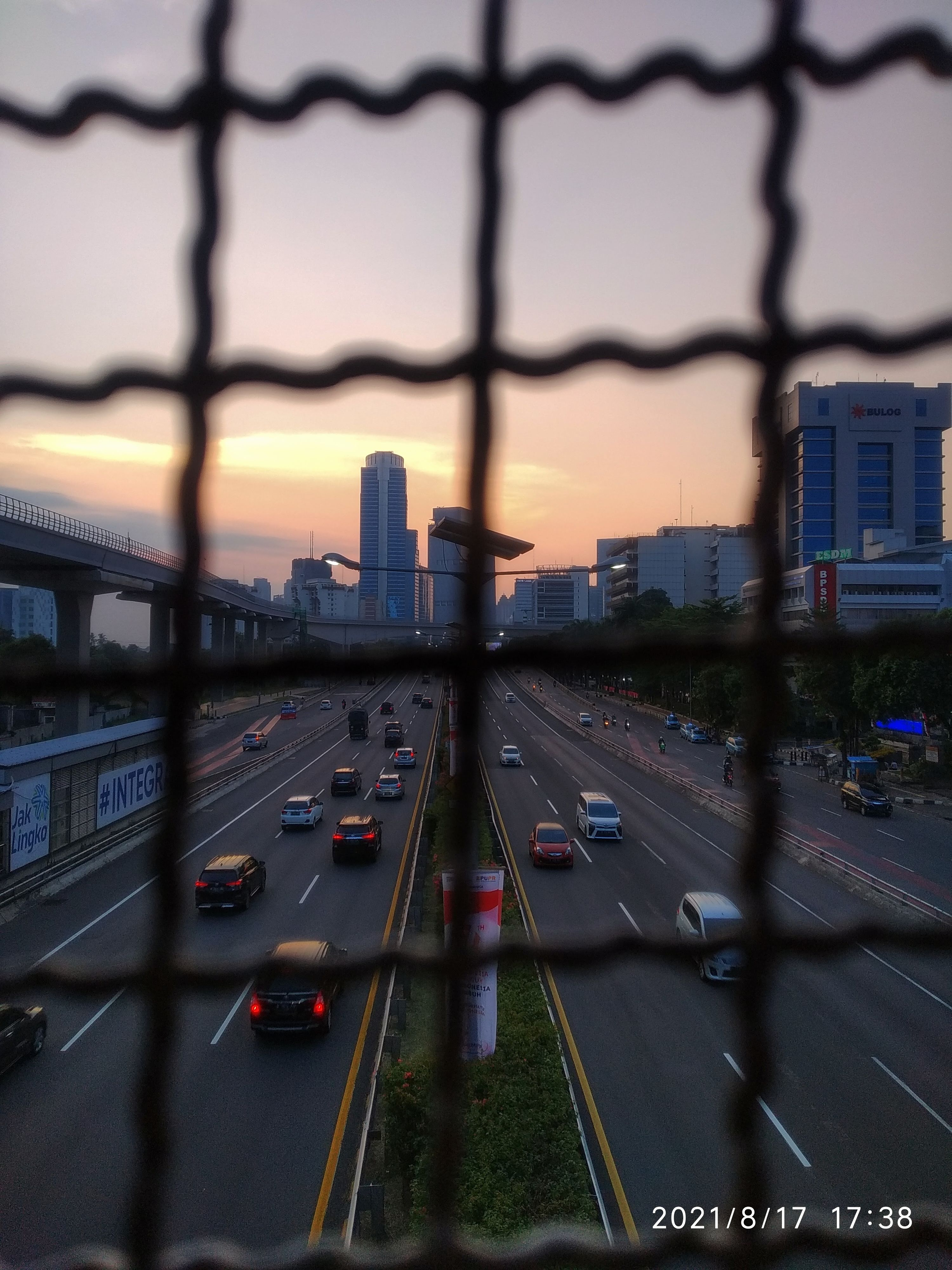
The Gatot Subroto Road and the Jakarta Inner Ring Road at dusk.

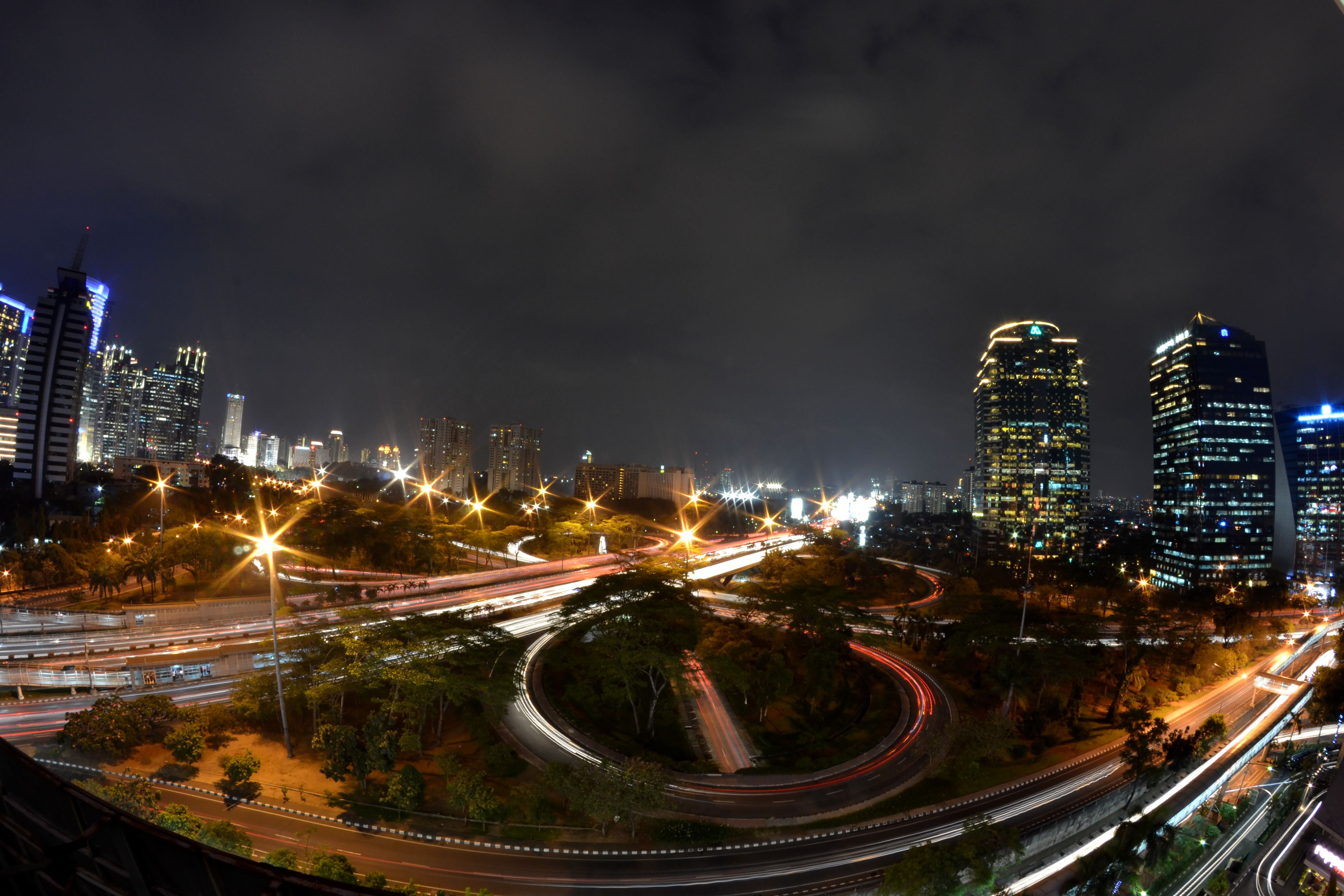
The Semanggi Interchange as one of the major intersection on this road (2012)

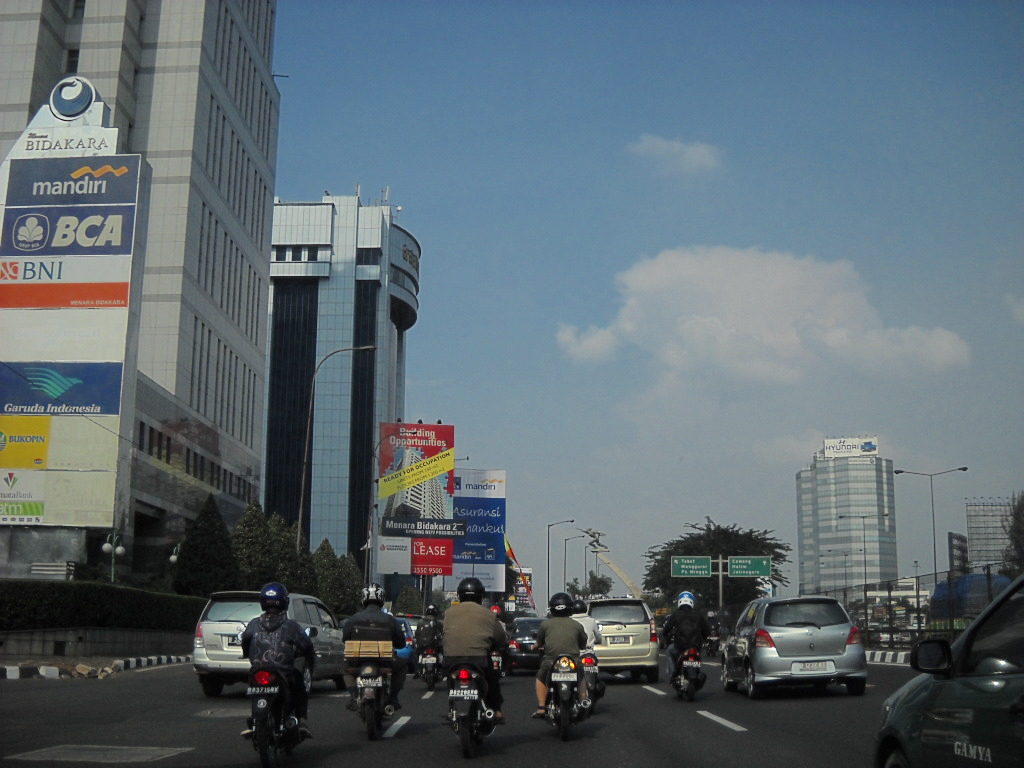
The DIrgantara Monument seen from afar (2010)

== See also ==
- History of Jakarta
- Jalan HR Rasuna Said
- Gatot Soebroto
