= Semanggi Interchange =

Major road junction in Jakarta, Indonesia

- Simpang Susun Semanggi; Jembatan Semanggi
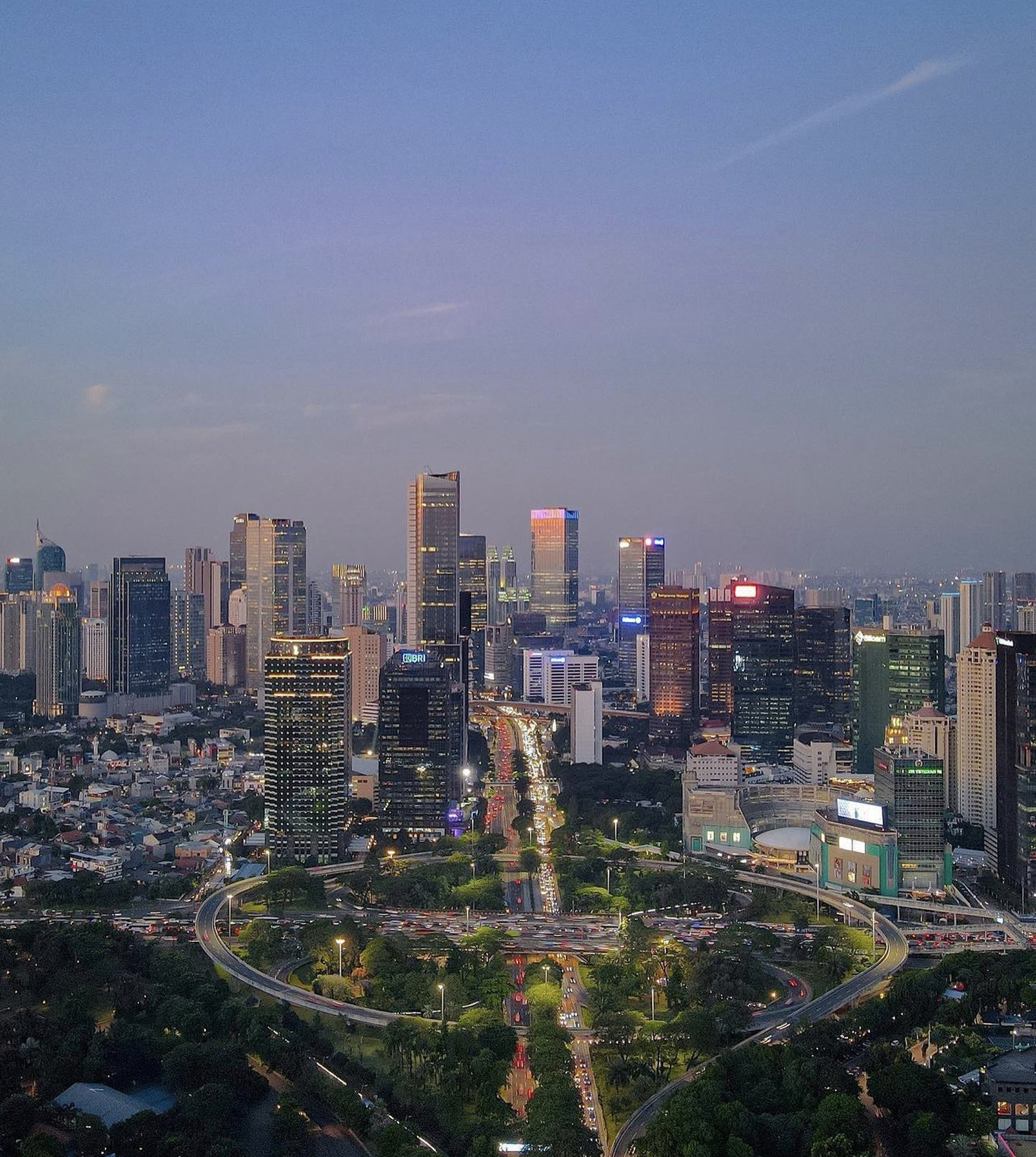
- The Semanggi Interchange in 2023

Location
- Jakarta, Indonesia
- Coordinates: 6.219754°S 106.814478°E
- Roads at junction: Jalan Jenderal Sudirman; Jalan Jenderal Gatot Subroto

Construction
- Type: Cloverleaf and turbine interchange
- Constructed: 1961–1962; 1987–1989 (first modification); 2016–2017 (second modification)
- Opened: 1962
- Maintained by: Roads Service of Jakarta

Semanggi Interchange (Indonesian: Simpang Susun Semanggi) or commonly known as Semanggi Bridge (Indonesian: Jembatan Semanggi) is a major road interchange in Jakarta, Indonesia which consists of a cloverleaf interchange (hence Semanggi, "clover")—the first, and until the 1990s the only, of its kind in Indonesia—and a partial turbine interchange. Two main roads of the city Gatot Subroto Road and Sudirman Road intersect at this interchange. Initially completed in 1962 as part of several projects intended to be completed before the 1962 Asian Games, the interchange is a landmark and an important part of the Golden Triangle of Jakarta.

== History ==
=== 1960–1962 ===
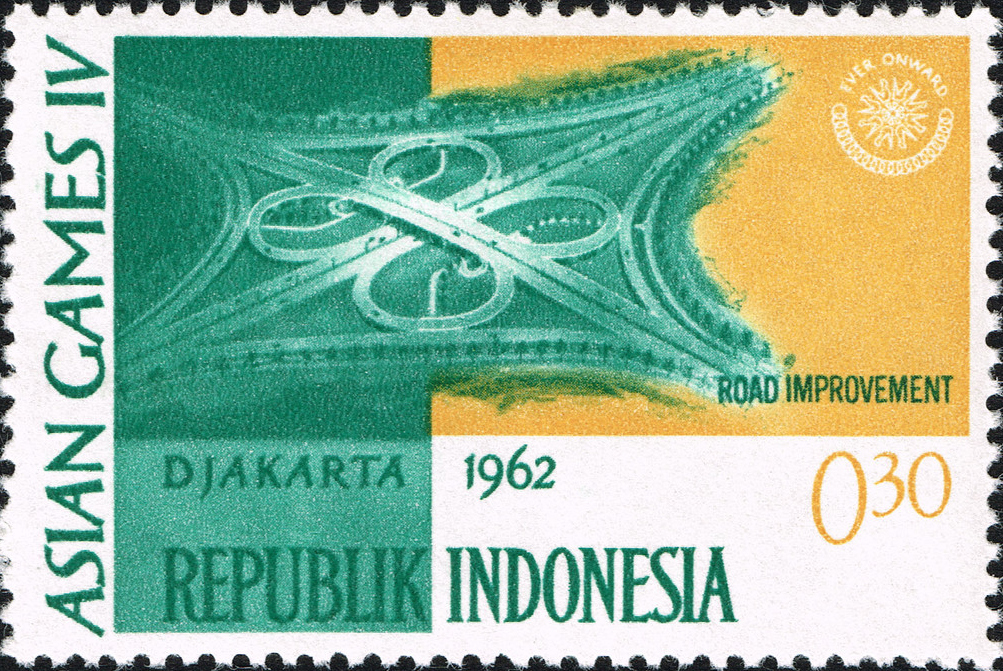
The 1962 Asian Games stamp depicting the Semanggi Bridge as the part of "road improvement" in Jakarta

Semanggi Interchange was built in the 1960s as the part of infrastructure development for 1962 Asian Games and Sukarno's vision to make Jakarta as the beacon of a new and powerful nation of Indonesia. The Semanggi Interchange area was previously a swamp area filled with clover trees. David Gee Cheng, the Indonesian Deputy Minister for City Planning and Construction, and Sutami, the state minister for construction assessment, presented their proposals to President Sukarno. Afterwards, Cheng and Sutami argued with each other about their proposals, with Sukarno observing them. Sukarno later chose Sutami's proposal as a blueprint for the interchange. It was named after semanggi (cloverleaf) by Sukarno. It was originally designed as one long continuous bridge with cloverleaf interchange. This design symbolized the unification of the territory of the city, as well as a symbol of Indonesian national unity. Before the development of Karet area, a swath of swamp full of clovers used to exist around it.

=== 1987–1989 ===
In 1987, the interchange was modified with the construction of two additional bridges alongside the original Gatot Subroto Road bridge. The modification was done to make way for the construction of Jakarta Inner Ring Road, which would use the original bridge structure. As the result, the 270-degree loops was completely rebuilt with box tunnels underneath instead of being an elevated structure like before. The modified Semanggi interchange was opened by President Suharto on 10 November 1989.

=== 2016–2017 ===
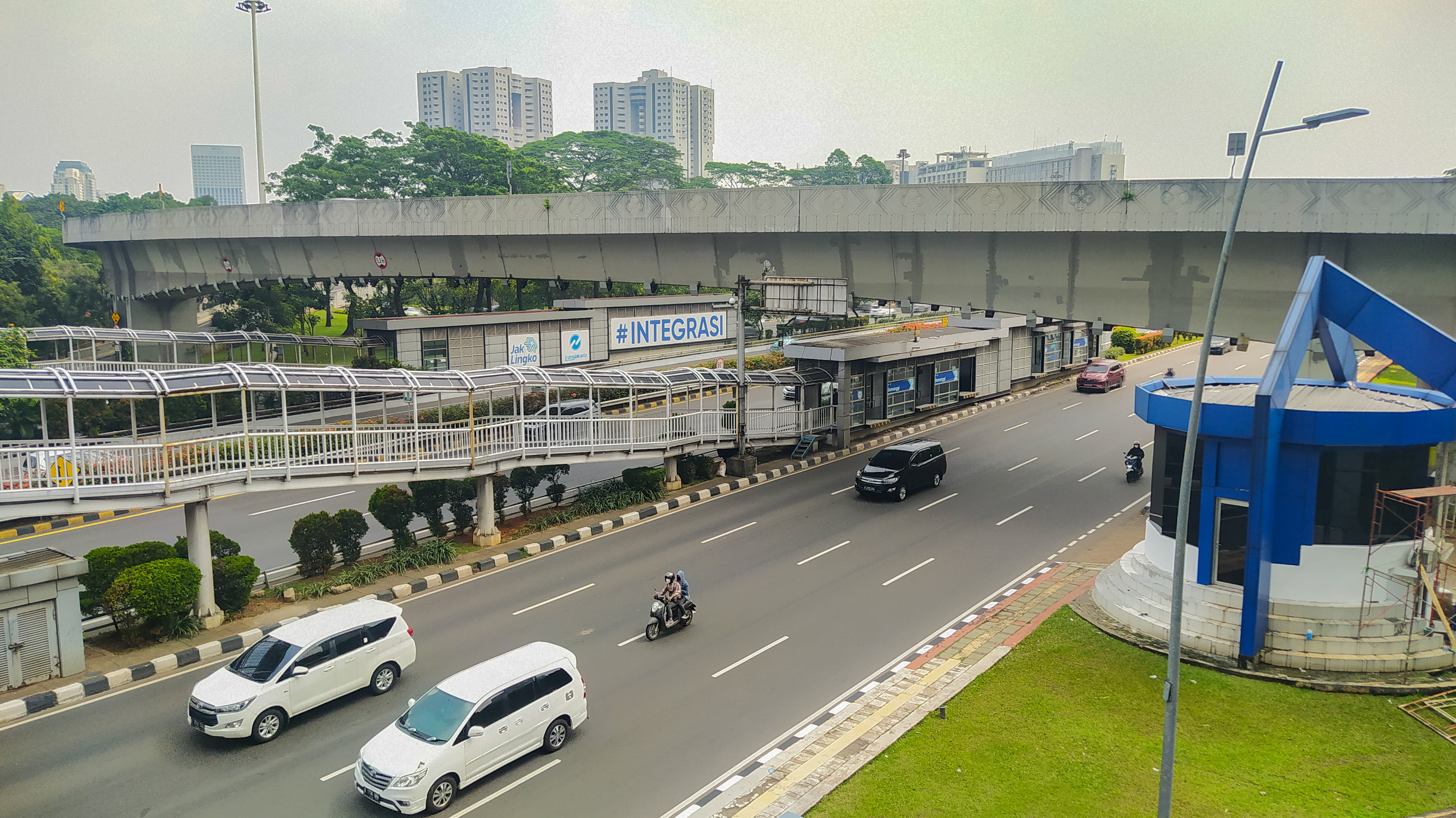
Two new interchange ramps are built above the Jakarta Inner Ring Road. Those ramps connects traffic flow from Cawang to Hotel Indonesia Roundabout/Monas and from Grogol/Slipi to Senayan/Kebayoran Baru

In 2016, the Governor of Jakarta, Basuki Tjahaja Purnama revealed a plan to build two elevated roads around the Semanggi cloverleaf to reduce traffic congestion in the area. The project would become the second modification of the Semanggi Bridge after the first one in 1987. These two new bridges stretch that formed a circle allows road users to drive from Cawang in East Jakarta to the Hotel Indonesia Roundabout (Bundaran HI)/National Monument (Monas), and from Grogol in West Jakarta to Senayan/Kebayoran Baru in South Jakarta. The new elevated road is built above the existing Semanggi intersection in front of the well-known The Plaza Semanggi (now Lippo Mall Nusantara) in South Jakarta. The West-South ramp is 769 meters long (between 6 and 11 meters above ground level). The other ramp is approximately 826 meters long with a height of up to 11.5 meters. It was opened to traffic on 28 July 2017 and officially inaugurated by President Joko Widodo on 17 August 2017.

=== 2019–present ===
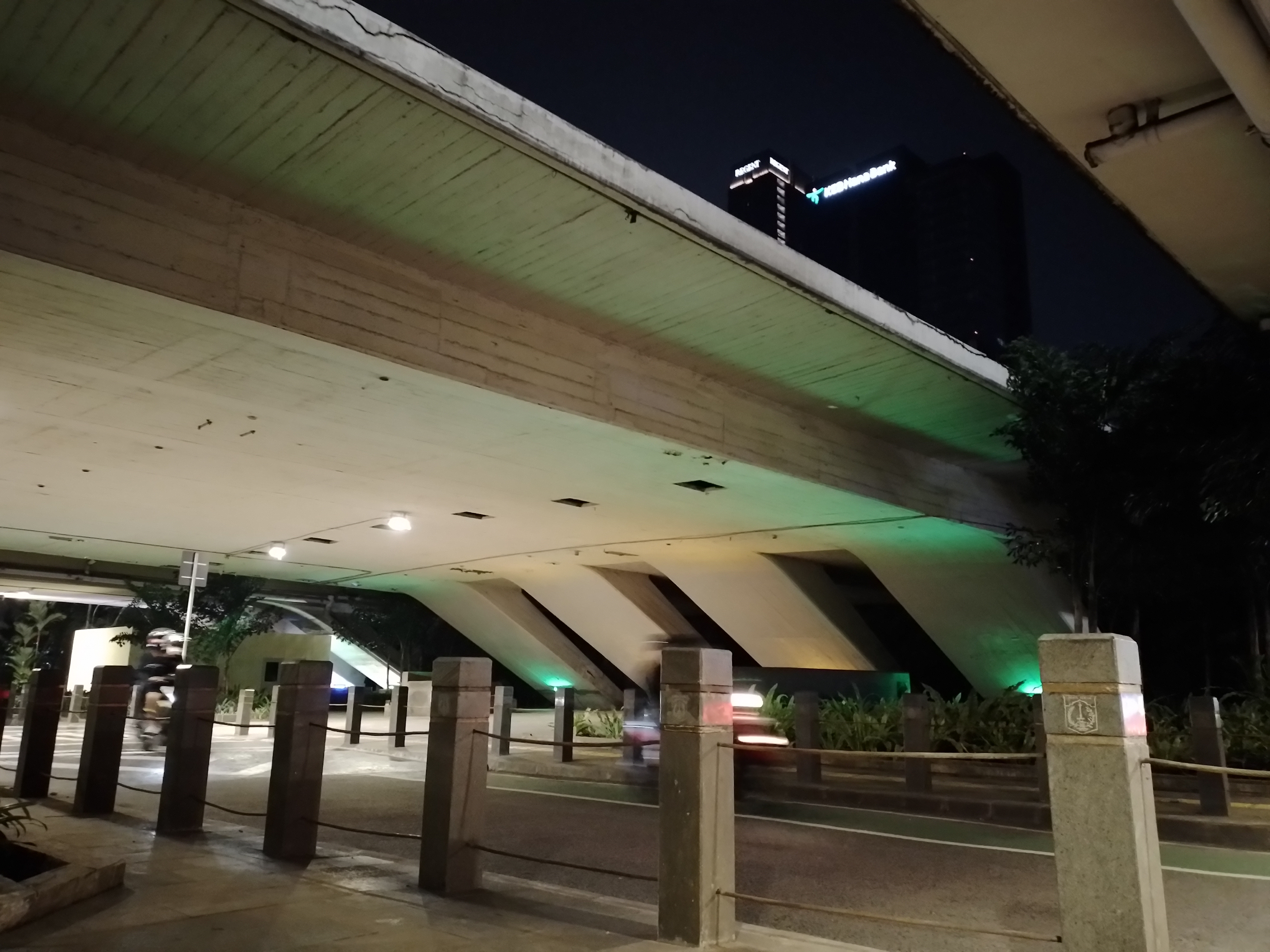
Cultural spot is built below the interchange. The cultural spot is made to create more open public spaces for cultural activities

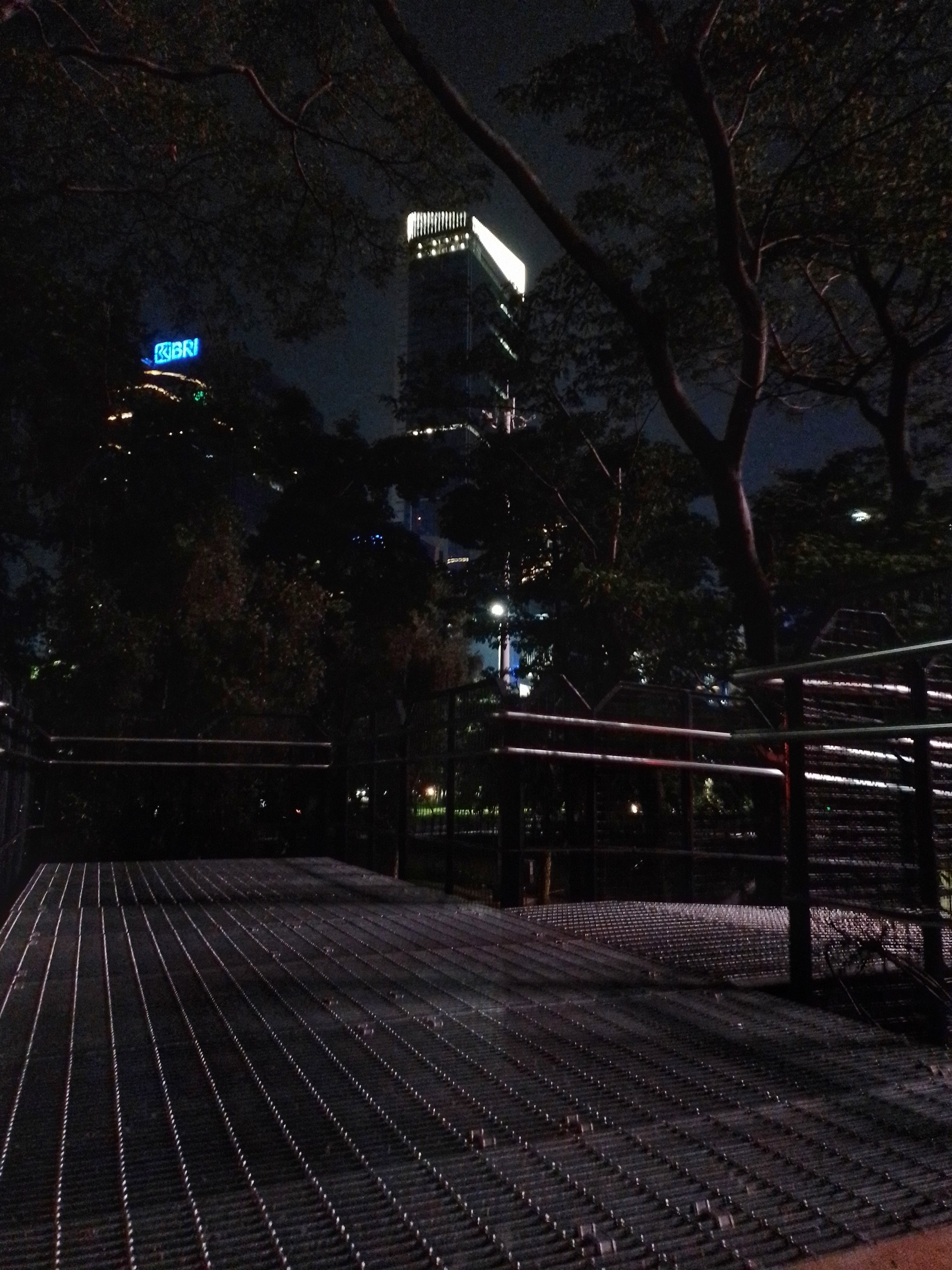
Apart from cultural spots and bicycle lane, there is also a jungle bridge or pedestrian path at the Semanggi Interchange Park. This new facility was inaugurated in October 2022.

Since 2019, developments of the Semanggi Interchange are focused on facilitating pedestrian and cyclers. Along with the sidewalk revitalization project along Jalan Jenderal Sudirman, a cultural spot was built under the Semanggi Interchange, precisely in the area of a tiny road made for motorcycles.

To make Jakarta more friendly for cyclers and pedestrians, in August 2022, a new bicycle lane was built at the Semanggi Interchange which was separated from the motorized road. The new bicycle lane was built across the Semanggi park so that a bicycle tunnel was built under the four existing clover-leaf ramps. The work is not only made for cyclers, a number of facilities have also been added at Semanggi Park, such as toilets, cultural spots, bicycle lounges, and pedestrian paths, so that Semanggi Park becomes an open park for communities, especially pedestrians and cyclists. Those new facilities was inaugurated by the Governor of Jakarta, Anies Baswedan on 12 October 2022.

== Philosophy ==
The shape of the clover leaf was chosen by Sukarno because it is considered as a symbol of national unity. The four parts of the leaf resemble the tribes in Indonesia, then put together into one unified whole leaf. Clover leaves are also likened to "suh" or binder broom sticks. The sticks that are held together by the "suh", so the sticks will be strong.

== Traffic flow ==
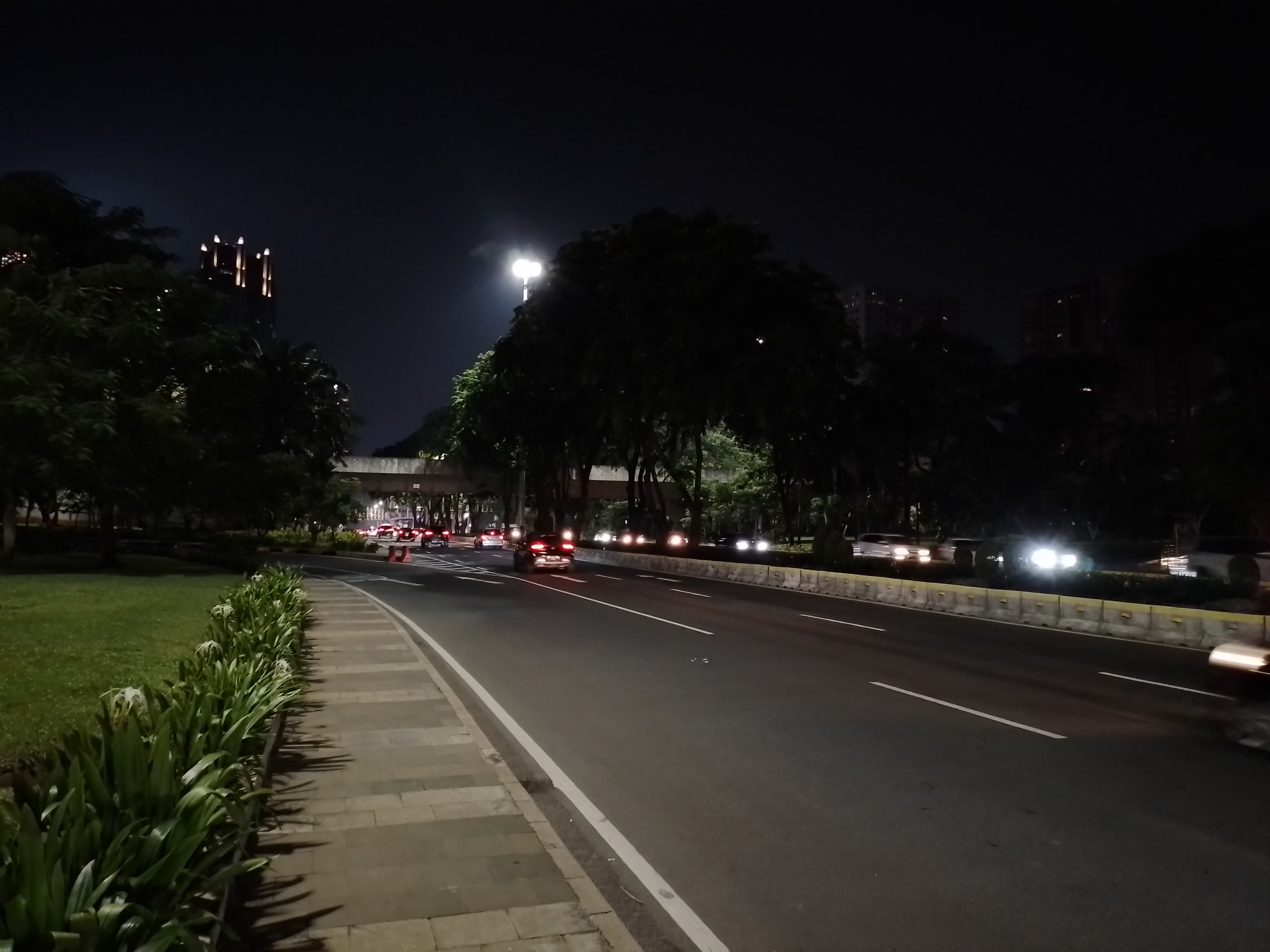
One of the road forks on the interchange.

=== Prior to 2017 ===
The Semanggi Interchange consists of ten ramps, consisting of eight existing ramps and two additional ramps. The eight existing ramps consist of four straight ramps and four curved ramps that form a clover leaf. The four lines connects:

- From Senayan/Kebayoran Baru to Grogol
- From Grogol to the Hotel Indonesia Roundabout (Bundaran HI)/National Monument (Monas)
- From the Hotel Indonesia Roundabout (Bundaran HI)/National Monument (Monas) to Cawang
- From Cawang to Senayan/Kebayoran Baru

In addition to straight lines, there are four other ramps that shaped clover leaves form, those ramps connects:

- From Cawang to the Hotel Indonesia Roundabout (Bundaran HI)/National Monument (Monas)
- From Senayan/Kebayoran Baru to Cawang
- From Grogol to Senayan/Kebayoran Baru
- From the Hotel Indonesia Roundabout (Bundaran HI)/National Monument (Monas) to Grogol

=== After 2017 ===
The two additional ramps connects from Cawang to the Hotel Indonesia Roundabout (Bundaran HI)/National Monument (Monas) and from Tomang/Grogol to Senayan/Kebayoran Baru, so that the four existing ramps that that shaped clover leaves form can only be used for U-turn from the Slipi/Grogol back to Slipi/Grogol and from Cawang back to Cawang and turn right from Senayan/Kebayoran Baru to Cawang and from the Hotel Indonesia Roundabout (Bundaran HI)/National Monument (Monas) to Slipi/Tomang.

== Incidents ==
The Semanggi Shootings were two incidents when state troops opened fire on unarmed civilians and protesters during special sessions of parliament. The first incident, known as Semanggi I, took place on 13 November 1998 and 17 people were killed. The second incident, Semanggi II, took place on 24 September 1999 and 12 people were killed and more than 200 wounded.

== Gallery ==
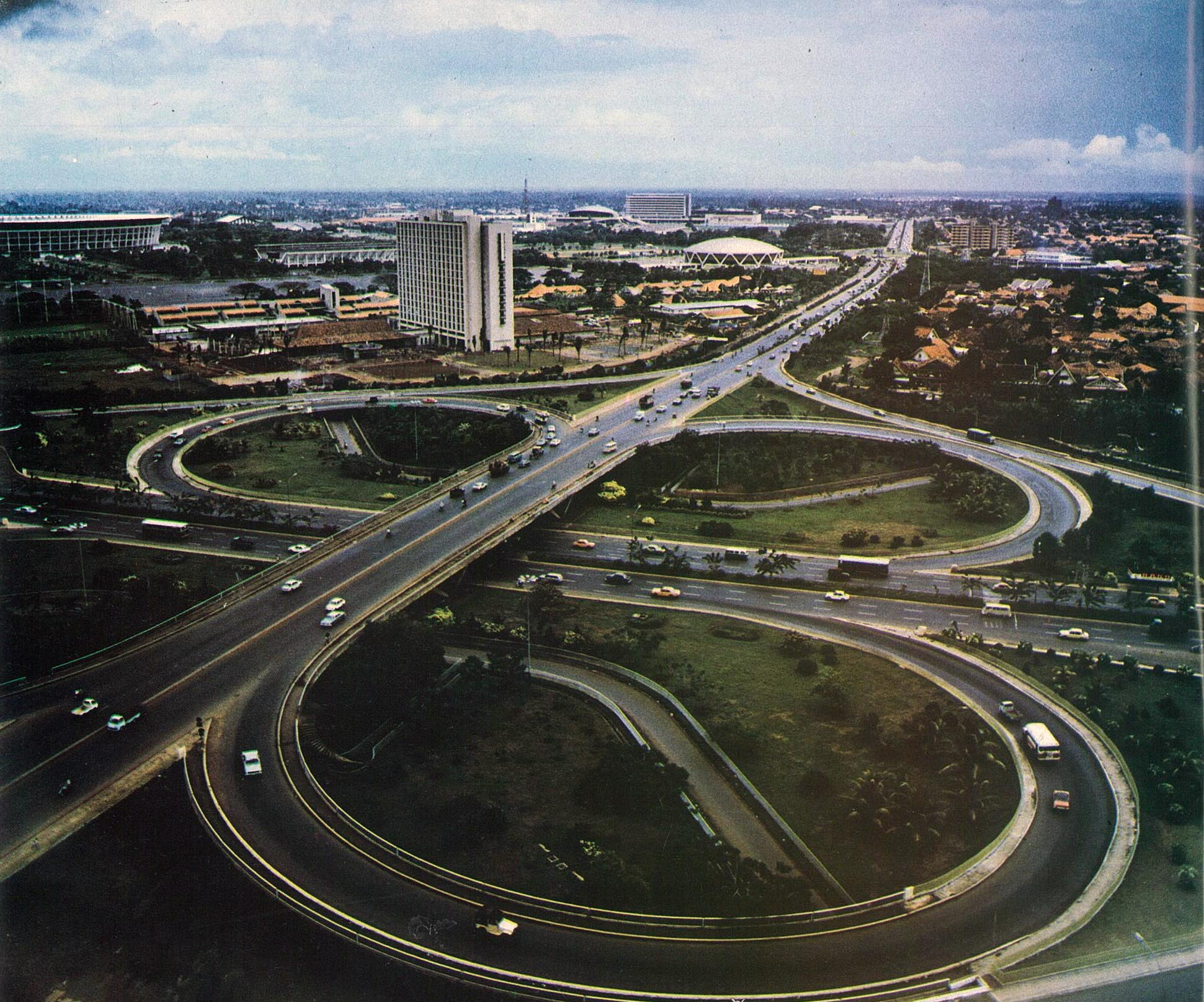
The Semanggi Interchange in 1976

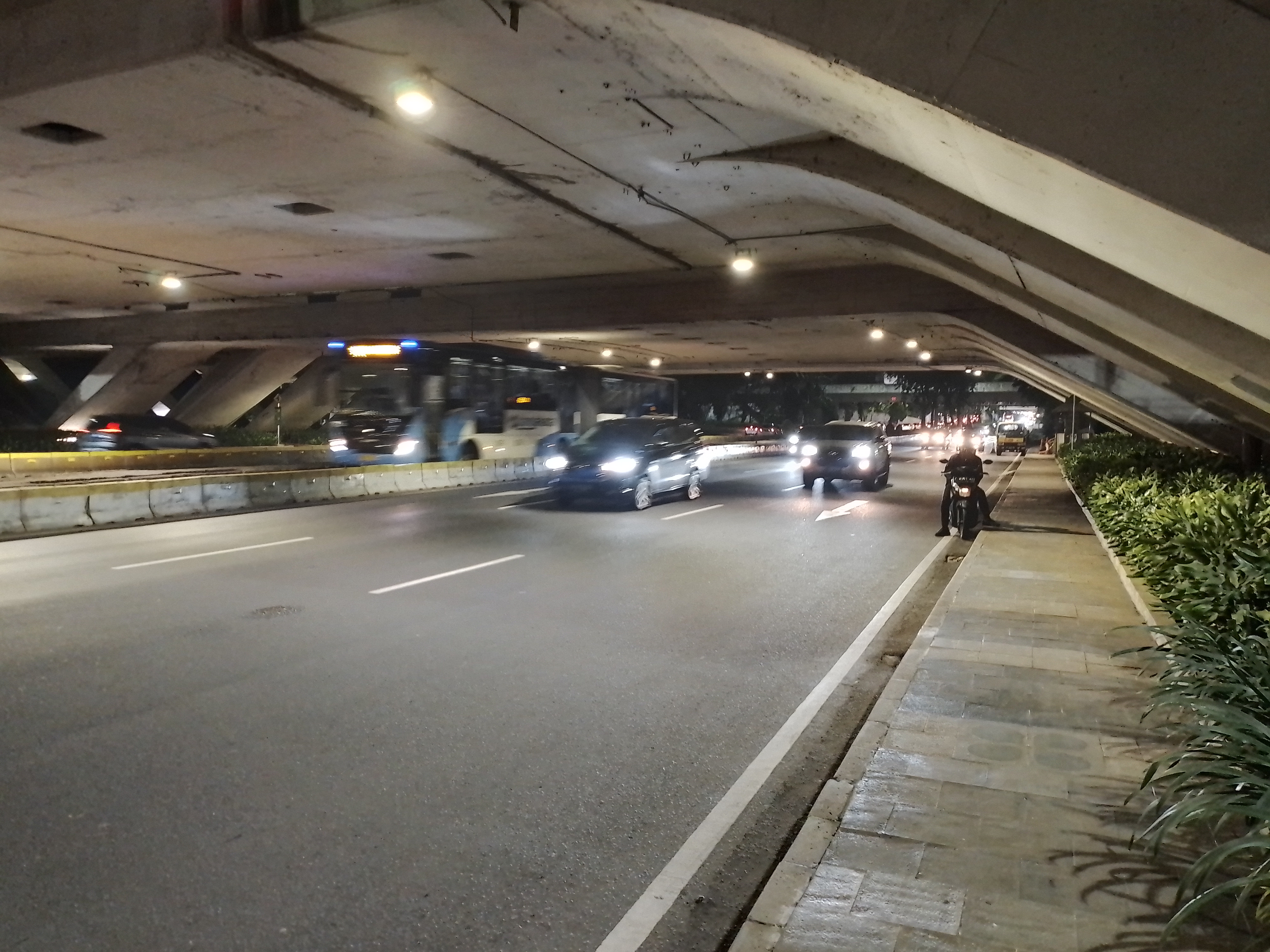
The traffic flow of the Jenderal Sudirman Avenue below the interchange (2022)

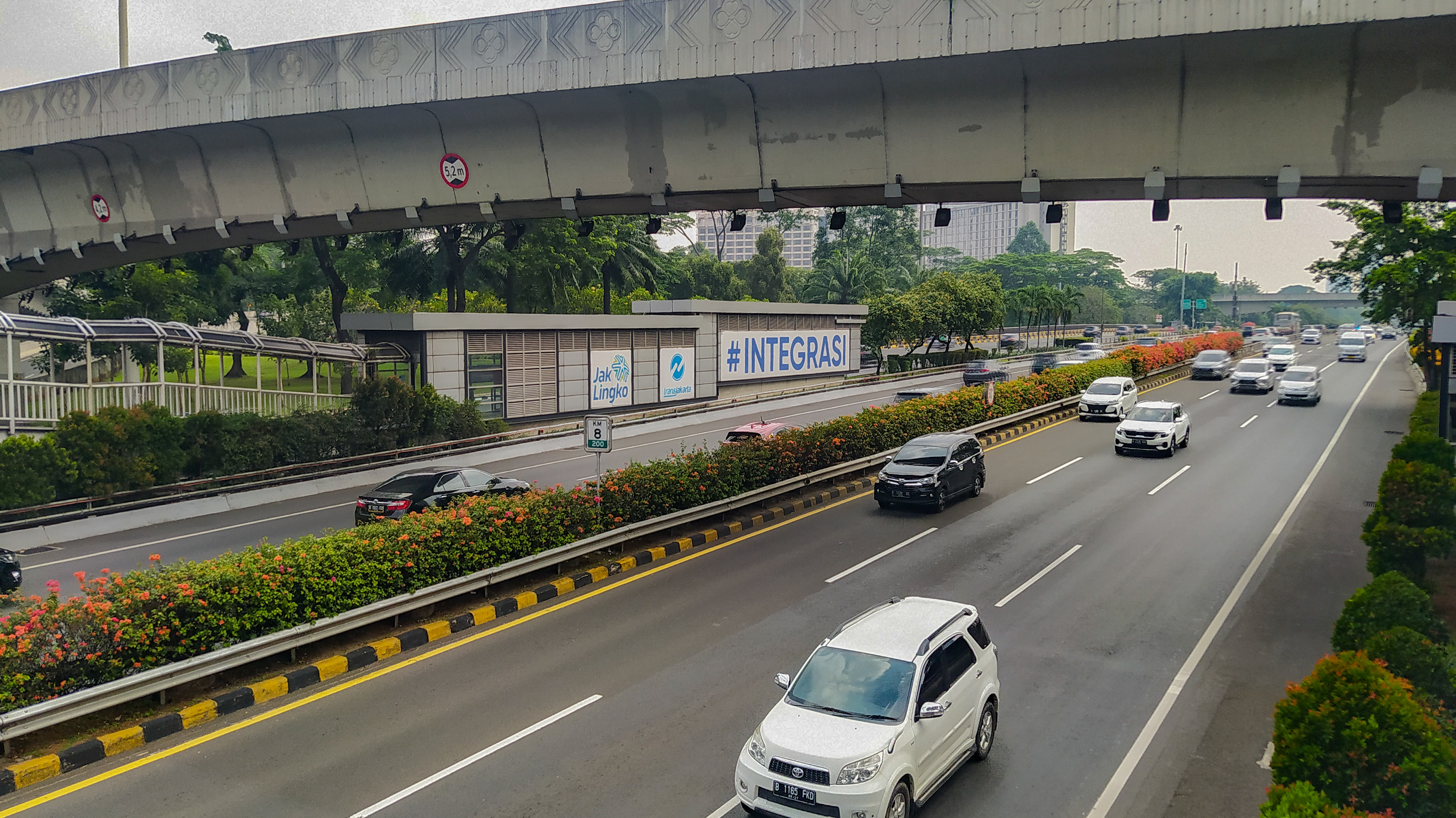
The "Semanggi" TransJakarta BRT Station at the interchange seen from a pedestrian bridge

== See also ==
- History of Jakarta
- Cloverleaf interchange
- Jalan Jenderal Sudirman
- Jalan Jenderal Gatot Subroto
- Sukarno
