= Pengangkutan Penumpang Djakarta =

Defunct Indonesian transport enterprise

Perum Pengangkutan Penumpang Djakarta

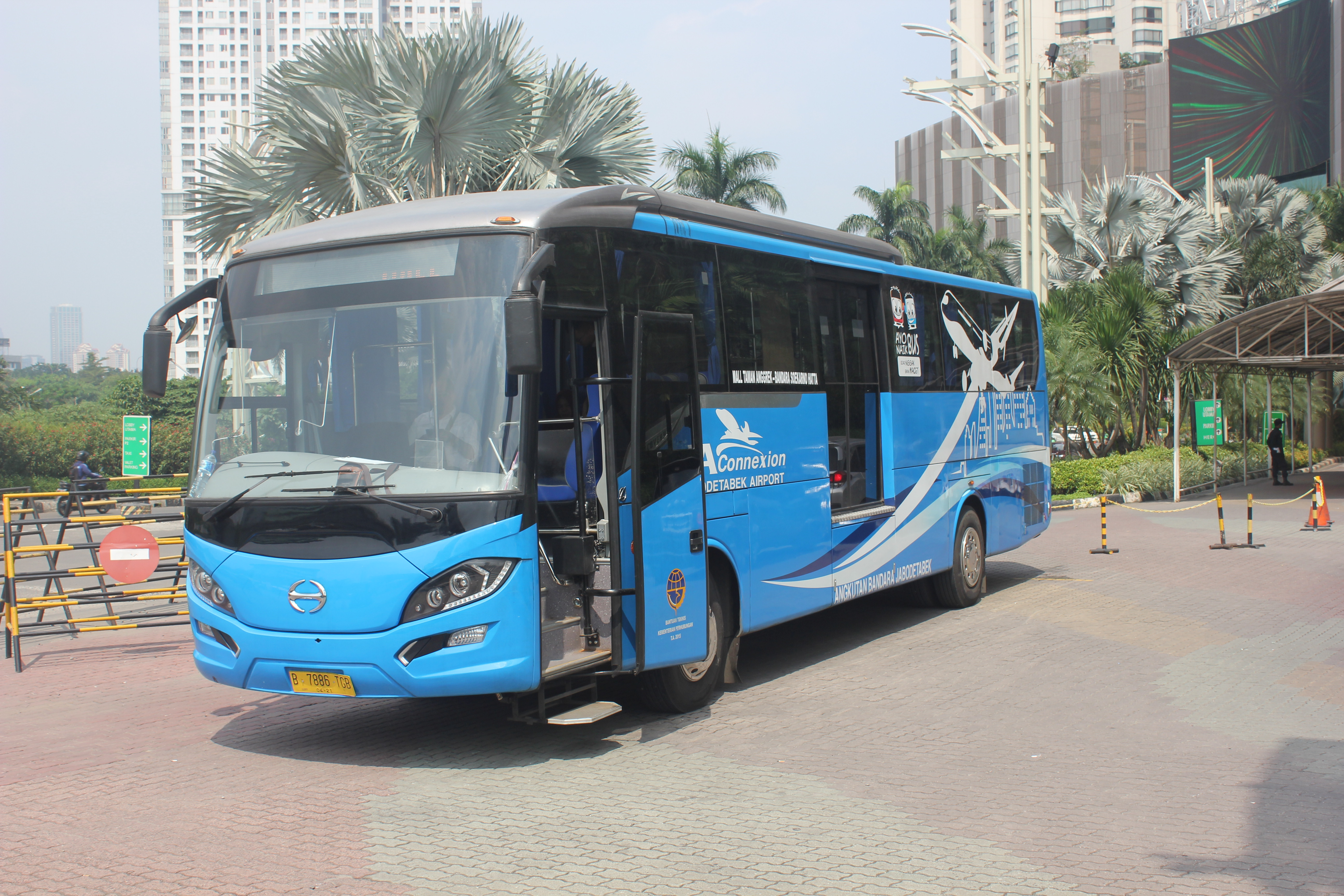
- Parent: Government of Indonesia (Ministry of State Owned Enterprises)
- Defunct: 8 June 2023 (merged into Perum DAMRI)
- Headquarters: Jl. Mayjen D.I. Panjaitan No.1. Cawang – East Jakarta 13410
- Locale: Jabodetabek and Denpasar
- Service type: City transport, airport transport, tourism transport
- Lounge: Executive & business
- Depots: Cawang, Klender, Pulogadung, Cakung, Tangerang, Depok
- Fuel type: Diesel fuel, CNG
- Chief executive: Pande Putu Yasa
- Website: www.perumppd.co.id

Perusahaan Umum Pengangkutan Penumpang Djakarta (lit. Djakarta Passenger Transport Public Corporation) simplified as Perum PPD or PPD, was an Indonesian statutory corporation operating land transportation in Jakarta and the surrounding areas. It was merged into Perum DAMRI on 8 June 2023.

It is known that Perum PPD operated approximately 494 single buses and 59 articulated buses for TransJakarta. Perum PPD was also known to operate JA Connexion, JR Connexion and Transjabodetabek routes serving Jakarta's suburban area and Trans Sarbagita in Denpasar, Bali.

== History ==
Founded back at 1920, Perum PPD is a state owned company that is under control of the Ministry of Transportation that went along with the country's history. What would be Perum PPD, which have been commissioned as a public company in 1981 based on Government Regulation No. 24 of 1981 which is enhanced into Government Regulation No. 32 of 1984, is the result of merging the Nederlandsch Indische Tram Maatschappij with the Bataviasch Elektrische Tram Maatschappij approaching in 1925 corresponding with the advice from the Burgemeester of Batavia City which was under Ir. Voorneman and became Bataviasche Verkeers Maatschappij (BVM NV).

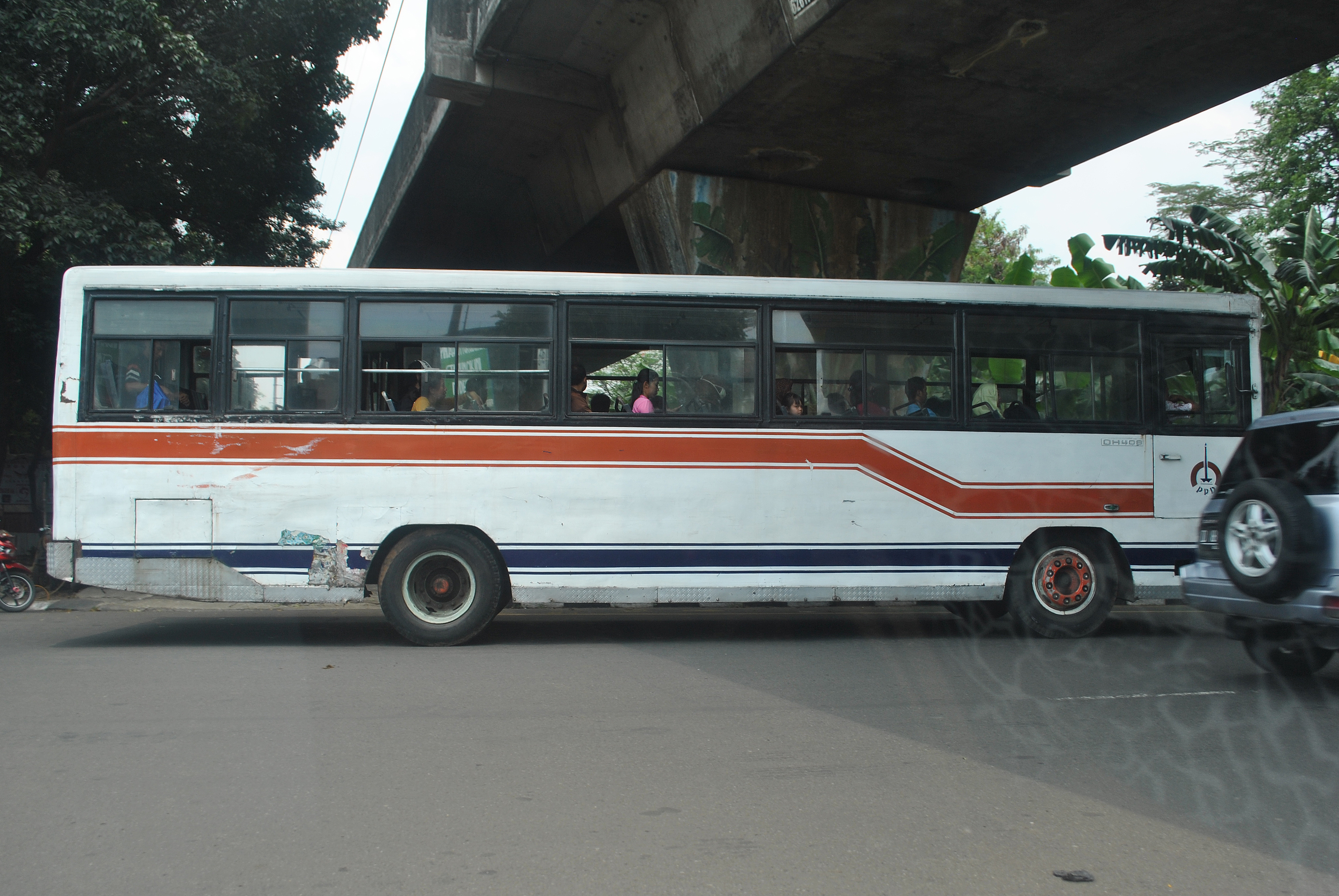
A locally bodied Mercedes Benz OH 408

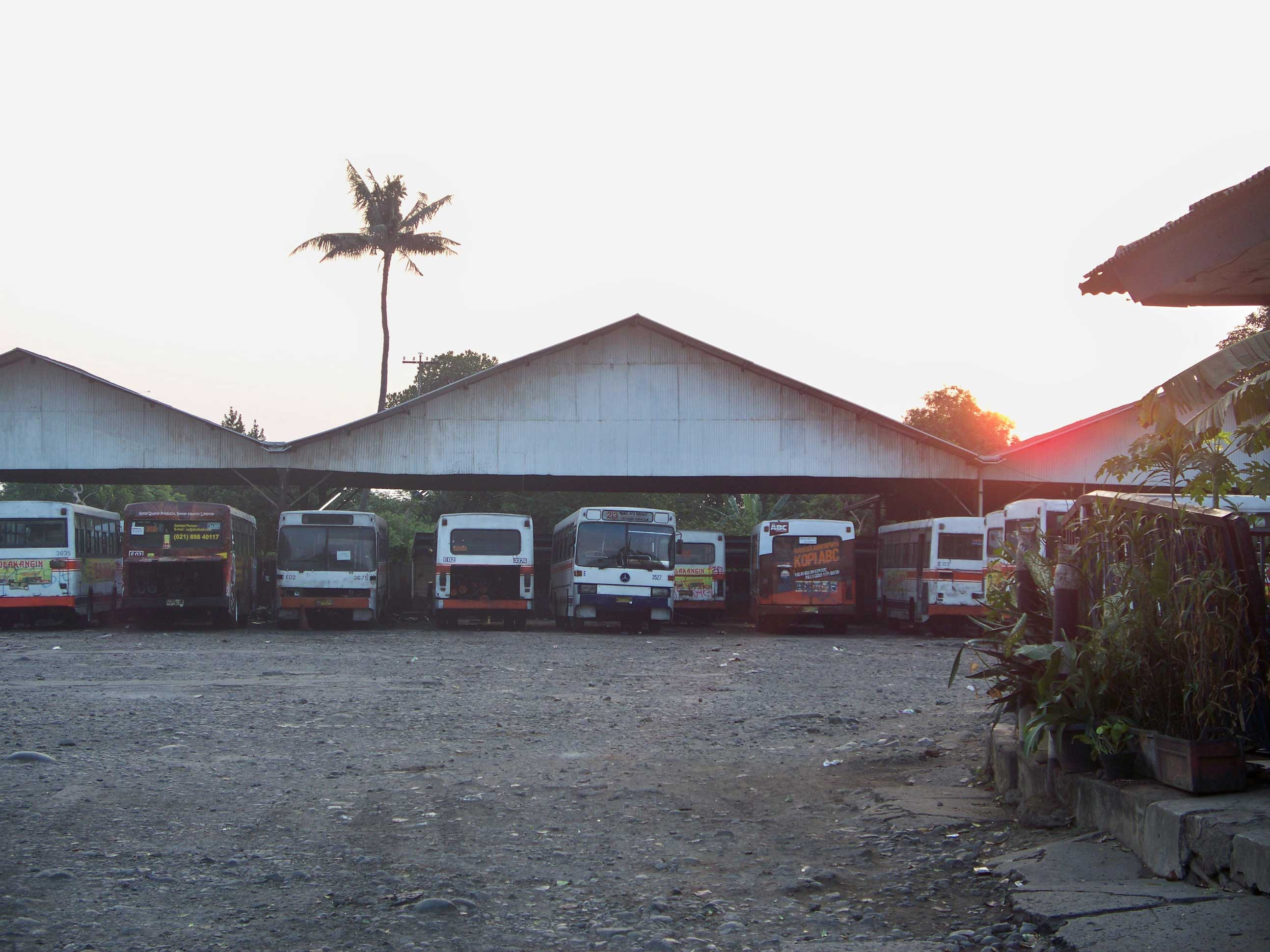
PPD bus depot at Klender

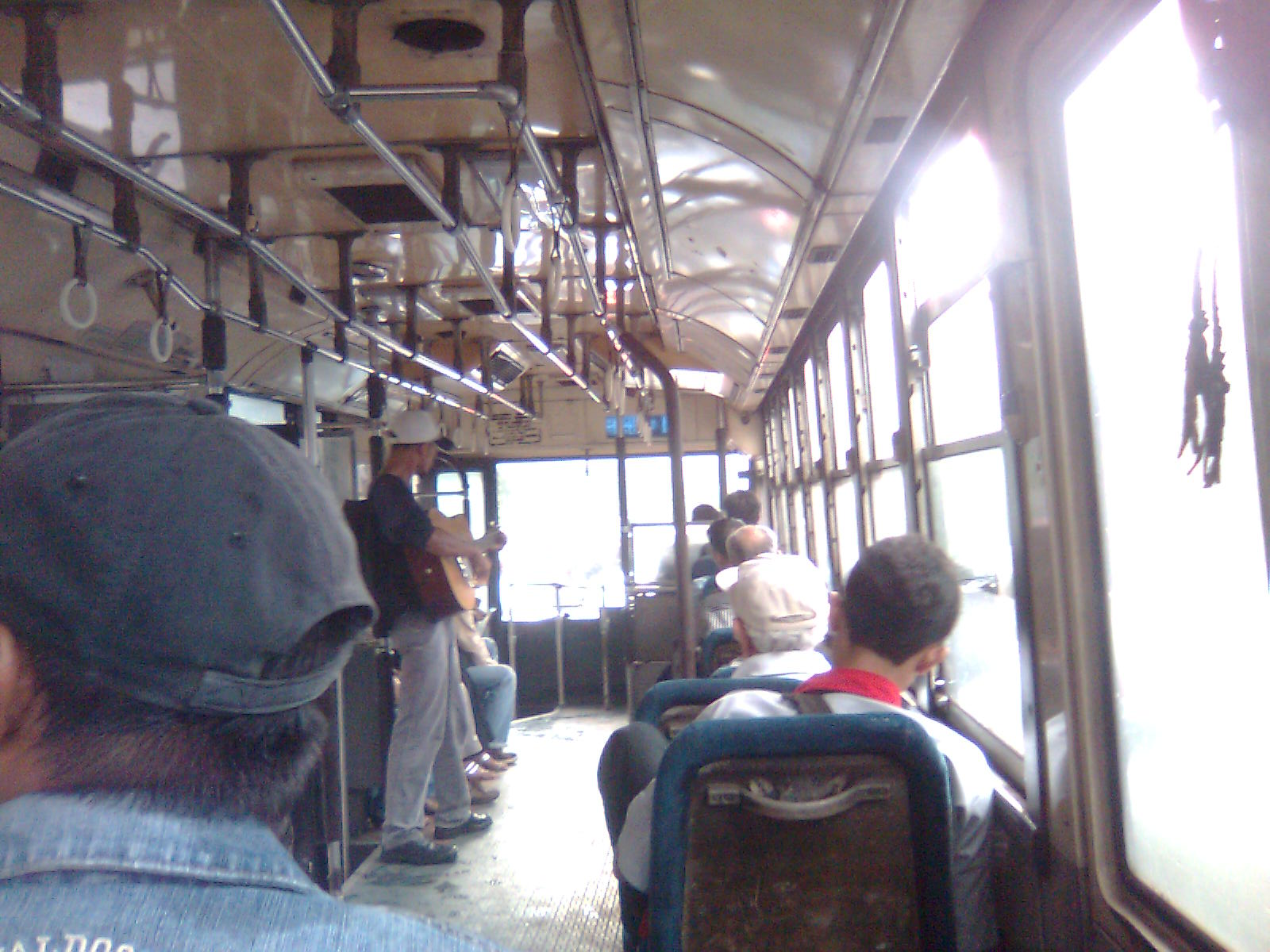
Former Japanese bus operated by Perum PPD

However, since the occupation of Japan in Indonesia from 1942 until 1945, BVM NV was changed into Djakarta Shinden (Jakarta Tram (ジャカルタ市電, Jakarta Shiden)) which only operates the city's tram. City buses from the BVM NV was used for other needs. Just a day after The Nation proclaimed independence, a number of workers of Djakarta Shinden sponsored by Menteng 31 youth urged for the Japanese authorities to immediately hand over the tram to the youth. Since 20 August 1945, the tram was handed over to the Indonesian Government and was operated by Djawatan Kereta Api tram section.

To prioritize public interest, BVMNV was then nationalized and controlled by the Transport Minister under Emergency Act No.10 of 1954. As a follow-up to the nationalization, with deed from notary Mr. Raden Suwandi No. 76 dated 30 June 1954 and No. 82 dated 21 December 1954, BVMNV has its legal form as a public company and named Perum Pengangkut Penumpang Djakarta (Perum PPD).

Based on Government Regulation No. 205 of 1961, the company changes status to state company (PN) under the Department of Land Transportation, Post, Telecommunication and Tourism, became Perusahaan Negara Pengangkutan Penumpang Djakarta (PN PPD). Then based on Government Regulation No. 229 year 1961 dated 20 September 1961, management of PN PPD was handed over from the Department of Land Transportation, Post, Telecommunication and Tourism to the Regional Government of DKI Jakarta. In 1981, management of PN PPD was returned to the national government through the Department of Transportation based on Government Regulation No. 23 of 1981 dated 17 July 1981. The company status became public company or perusahaan umum (perum) based on Government Regulation No. 24 of 1981, thus PN PPD returned into Perum PPD.

In 1991, Mercedes Benz OH 408s with completely built-up (CBU) body by Volgren and some completely knocked down (CKD) units with locally made bodies were purchased in preparation of the 1992 Non-Aligned Movement Summit. These buses were then operated by Perum PPD and Perum DAMRI as city buses in various cities throughout the country. The national government also received some to be operated as staff buses. In 2004, Perum PPD added 55 former Japanese buses to the fleet of regular city buses. Previously, Perum PPD received 30 buses donated by the Government of Japan and did not encounter problems. Perum PPD regular city bus services thrive up to 2011.

2011 starts a new era of public transportation in Jakarta. TransJakarta starts to open new routes, often overlapping Perum PPD regular routes. At this point, Perum PPD buses reach an age of 20 to 30 years without replacement, known as reckless buses and encounters many problems. In January 2011, the Jakarta Department of Transportation eradicates 15 bus route permits, including six Perum PPD routes. In 2013, Perum PPD did a transformation from regular city bus to Bus Rapid Transit (BRT). Perum PPD also did a transformation in the management in several aspects, namely financial, manpower and operational. By the end of 2016, all PPD city bus routes are either eradicated or deformed into a TransJakarta route (ex: PPD 213 into Corridor 5A, PPD 43 into Corridor 10, PPD 210 into Corridor 4A, etc).

On 8 June 2023, Perum PPD was officially dissolved and merged with DAMRI, based on the Government Regulation (Peraturan Pemerintah or PP) No. 30/2023. The regulation was signed two days earlier. The merge was first proposed by the Minister of State-Owned Enterprises, Erick Thohir in December 2022.

== Operation ==
Perum PPD had a number of sub-divisions serving different services, which are now controlled by Perum DAMRI.

=== Strategic Business Unit (SBU) TransBusway ===
Perum PPD operates 494 of the initial 600 Hino RK8JSKA-NHJ R260 units donated from the Ministry of Transportation for TransJakarta. Operation began on 11 April 2016 with a fleet of 10 buses, then gradually increases up to 494 units. These buses are distinguished by having 1 door each side, instead of the 2 doors on a standard single TransJakarta bus. The doors utilize sliding mechanism. The driver's door on the left anterior is also used for feeder operation. Buses are bodied by Restu Ibu Pusaka (Integra), Rahayu Santosa (Cityliner), and Laksana (Discovery). Unlike most newer TransJakarta buses, these units are not equipped with partitions separating the driver from the passengers. Beforehand, these buses are not equipped with CCTV and side running text display boards. However, as TransJakarta sets new service standards, CCTV and side running text display boards are mandatory equipment, therefore these facilities were then equipped to the buses. Seats are arranged to face the aisle. New Tap-On-Bus (TOB) equipment are also being added to support cashless feeder operation. Routes that SBU TransBusway buses serve are daily set by TransJakarta.

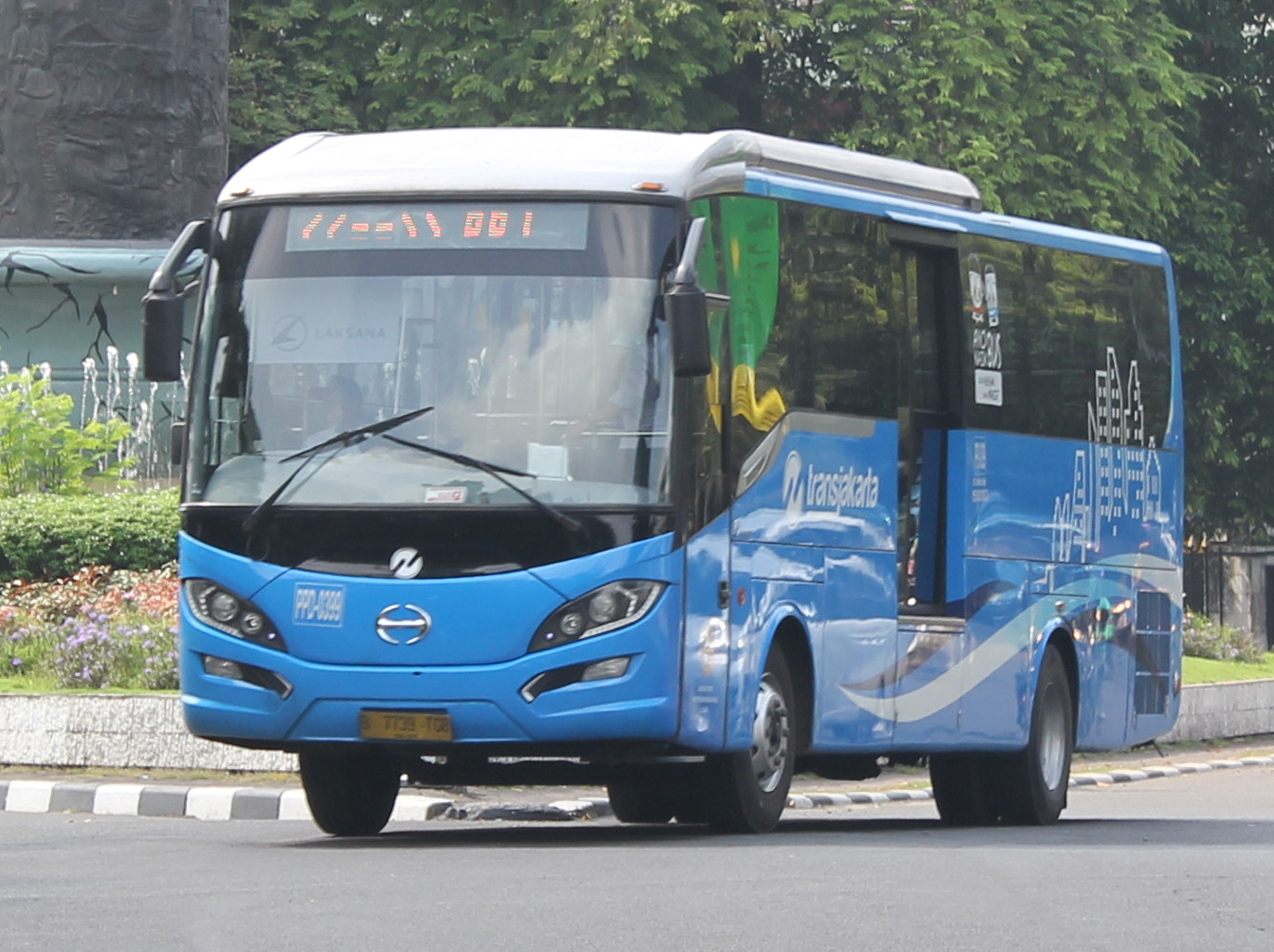
Discovery body by Laksana, serving Corridor 2C

Cityliner body by Rahayu Santosa, Serving Corridor 5

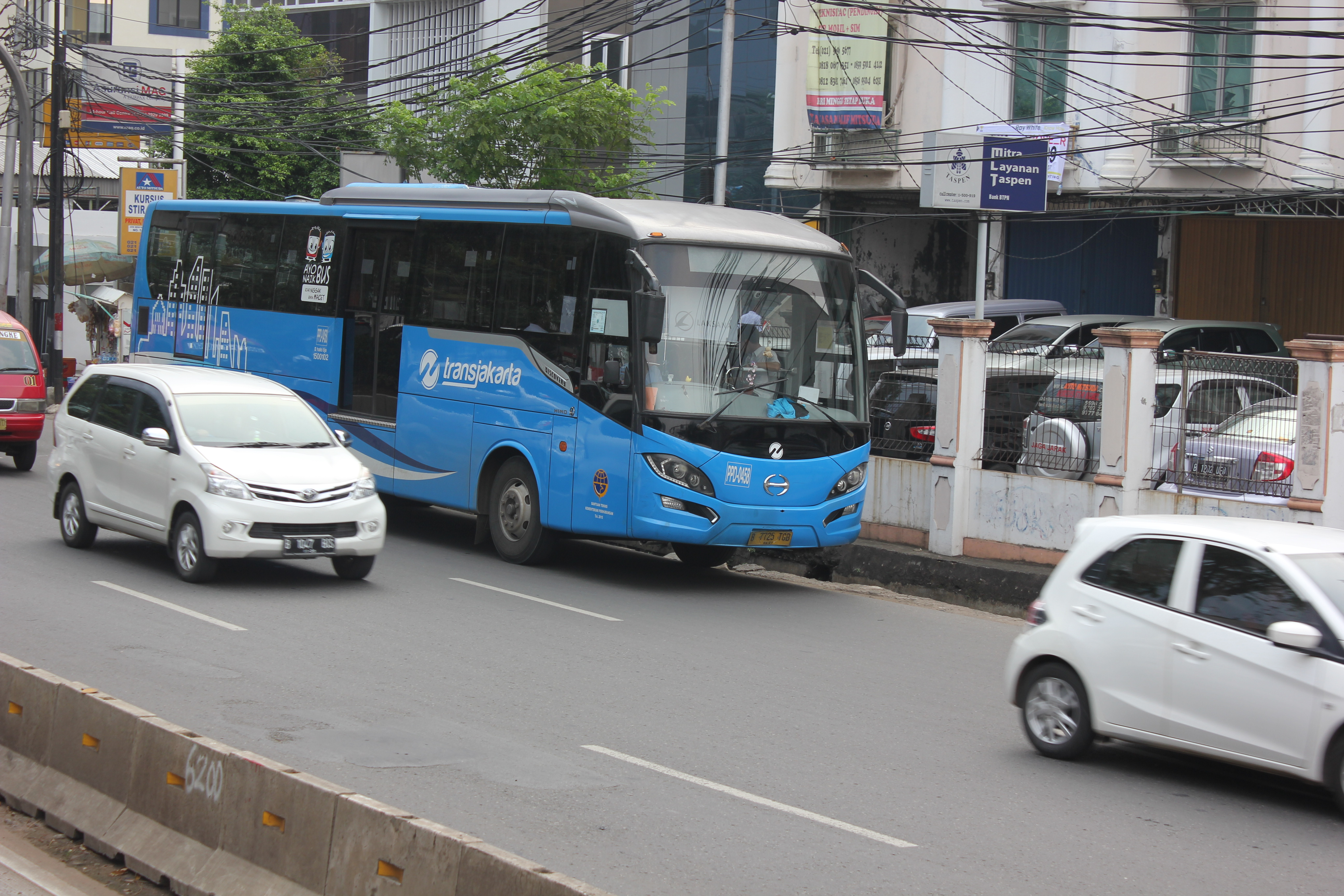
Discovery body by Laksana, serving Corridor 5A

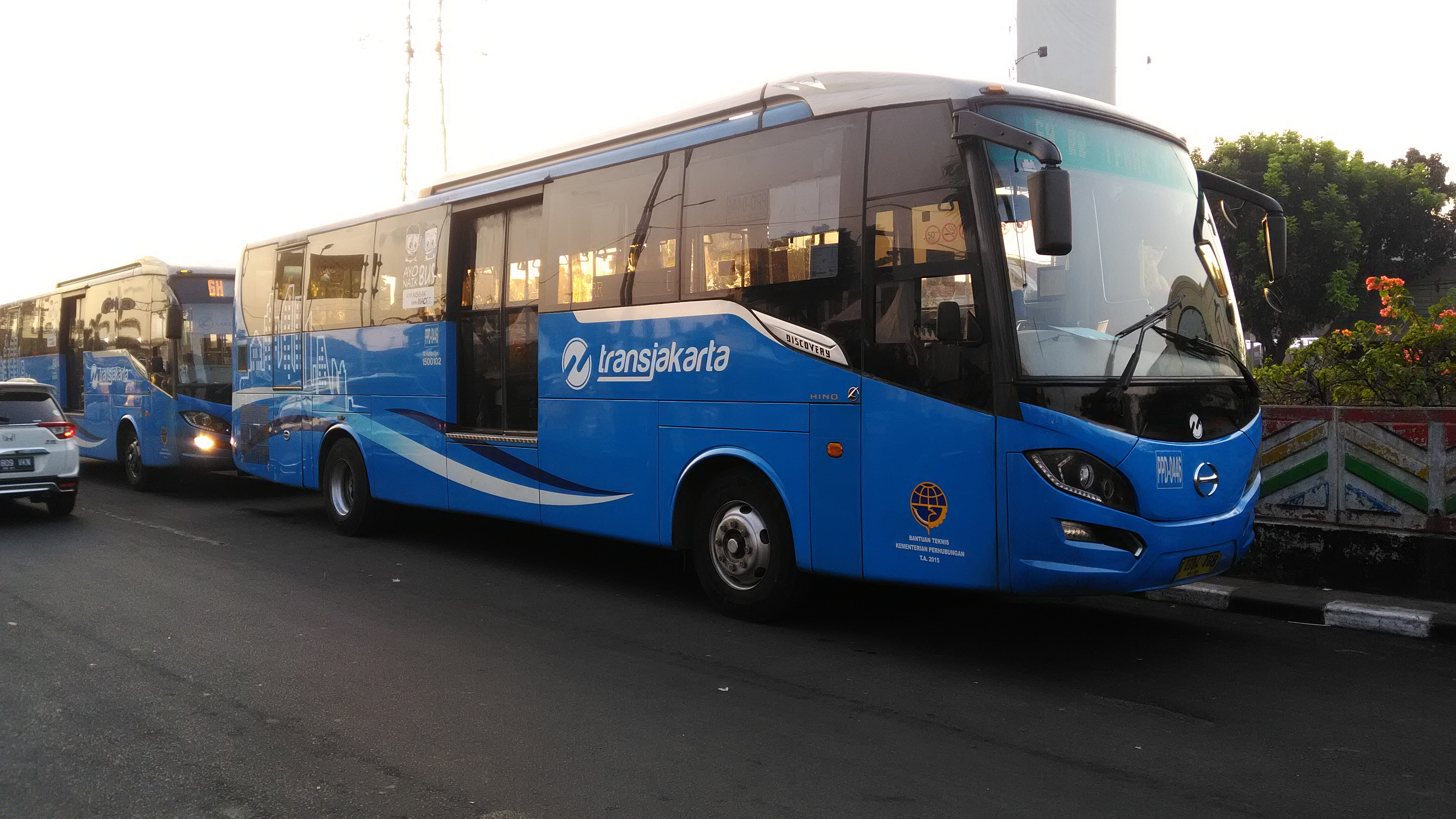
Discovery body by Laksana, serving Corridor 6H

=== Strategic Business Unit (SBU) TransJabodetabek ===
The main aim of this SBU is to create an urban transport that is effective, efficient, technology based and integrated with the airport and Jabodetabek region. Approximately 150 units are operated under SBU Transjabodetabek. The fleet consists of former APTB units and canceled SBU TransBusway units, therefore has an identical look to SBU TransBusway units. The main difference is by the service sticker on each side, near the doors. Units are operated for JA Connexion, JR Connexion and Transjabodetabek services, which are not integrated to the TransJakarta BRT service. Services are carried out throughout Jabodetabek. The service entirely utilizes the left anterior driver's door. Front-facing seats are featured and some are equipped with bag racks (mostly for JA Connexion service) to accommodate suitcases. All units are Hino RK8JSKA-NHJ R260s with a variety of bodies by Trisakti (Ultima), New Armada (Customed Aristo), and Laksana (Discovery).

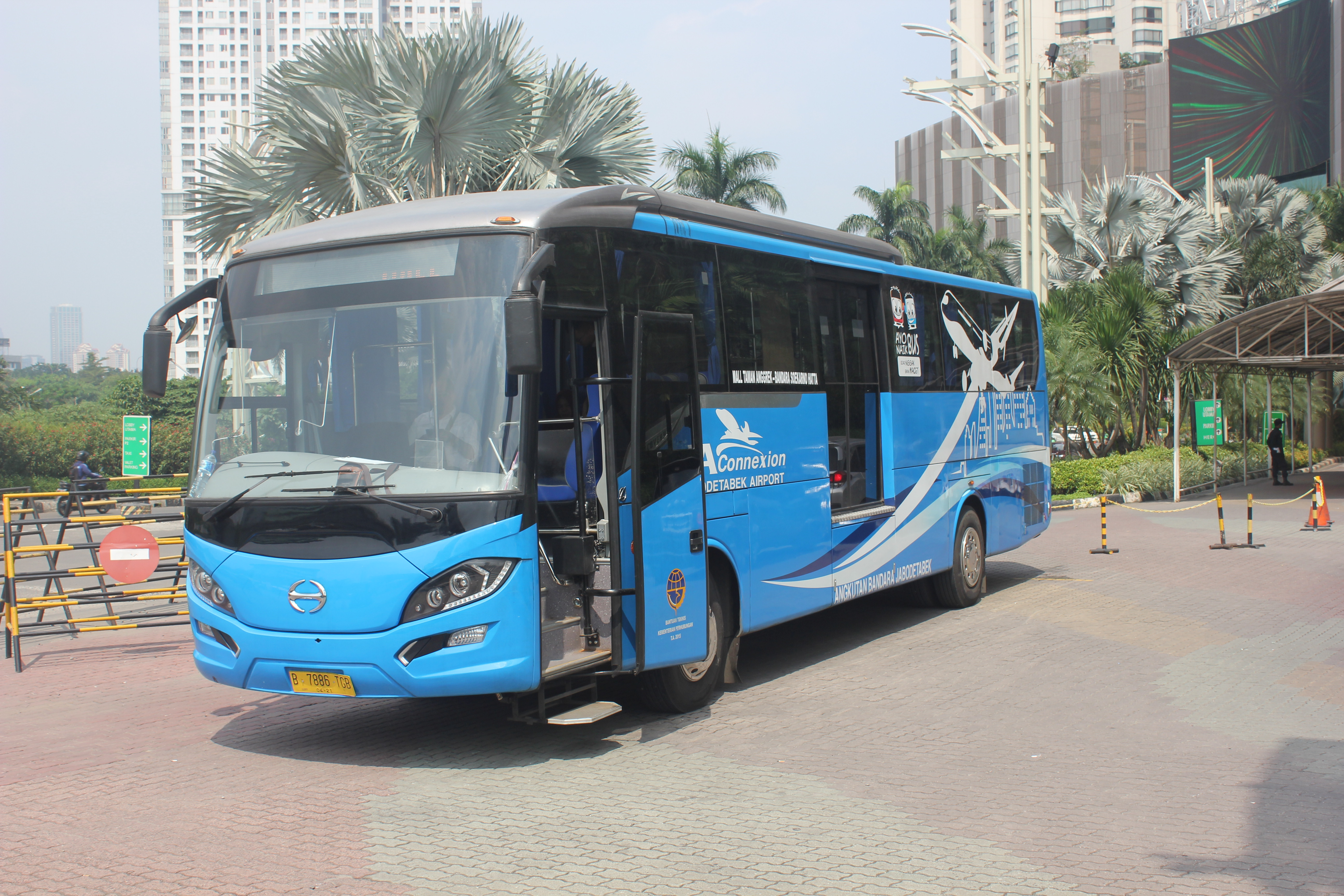
Discovery body by Laksana, JA Connexion Taman Anggrek Mall

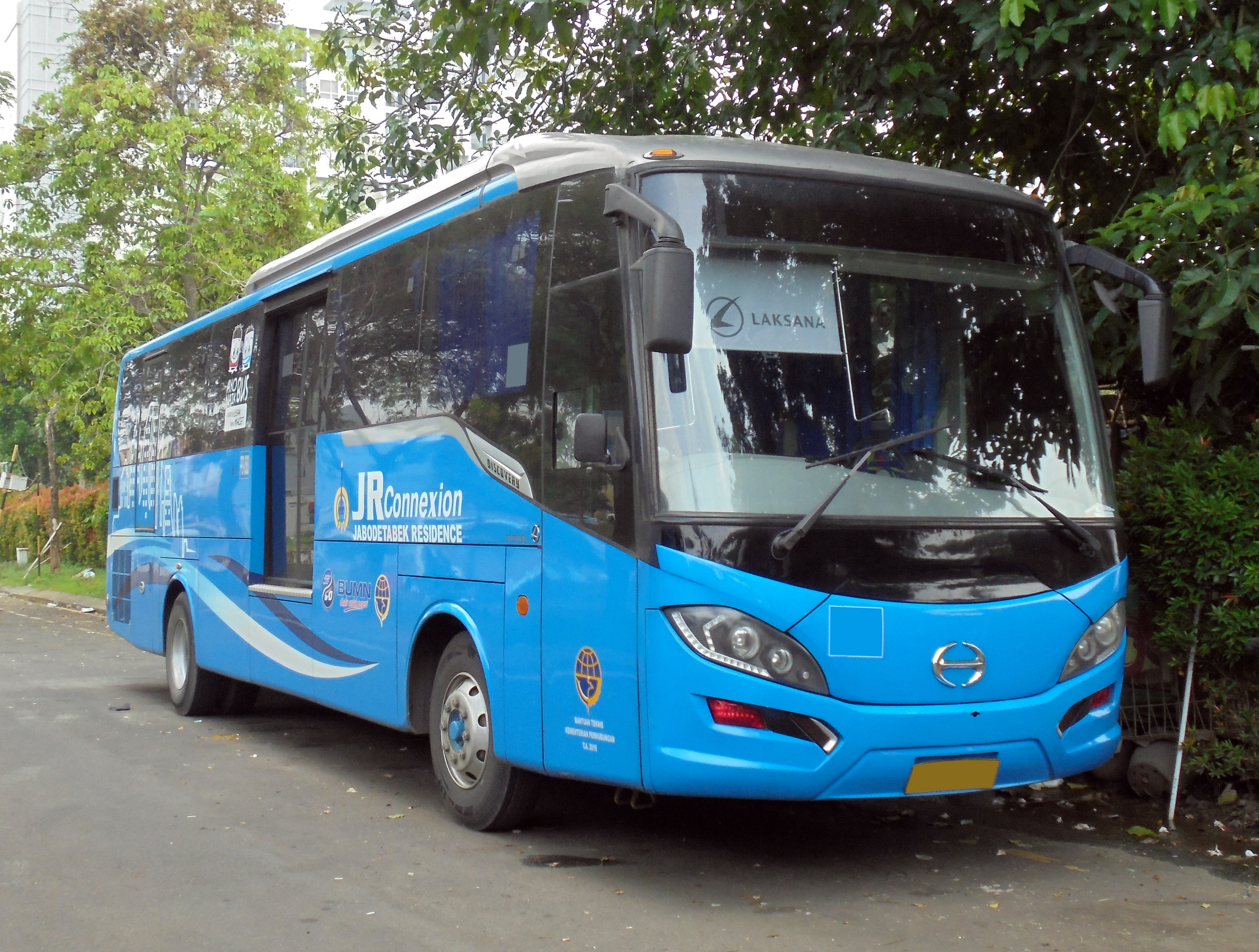
Discovery body by Laksana, serving JR Connexion

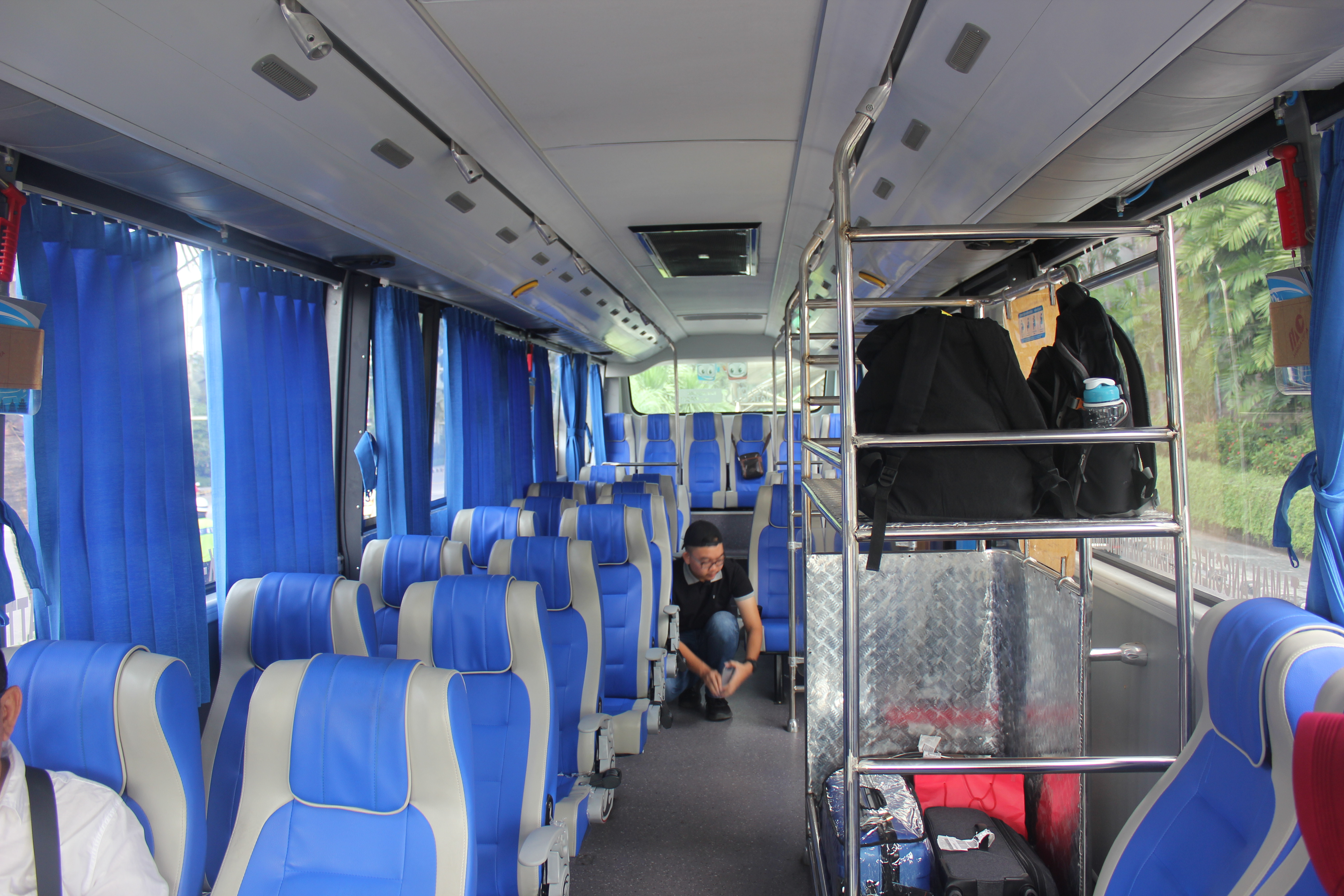
Interior of a JA Connexion bus with bag racks equipped

=== Strategic Business Unit (SBU) Trans PPD MAC ===
Perum PPD operates 59 articulated Zhongtong LCK6180GC buses for TransJakarta in cooperation with PT. Mobilindo Armada Cemerlang. This is the third batch of Zhongtong articulated buses for TransJakarta, after the first batch bought by Perum DAMRI and the second by the Jakarta Department of Transportation. A blue - white livery with blue stripes distinguishes these units from its identical predecessors that were colored with a red - yellow livery. The interior is dominated with yellow railings and features cushioned chairs. The units were imported in 2016, however administration problems led to a delay of operations up to 2019. It is stated that these units are not a part of the 2013 Bus Corruption.

=== Bali ===
In early November 2020, Perum PPD expanded its operations to Bali. 12 buses are operated initially, alongside 2 electric buses by BYD and PT INKA. 5 routes will be operated.

=== Strategic Business Unit (SBU) Bus Repair and Maintenance ===
SBU Pemeliharaan dan Perbaikan Bus provides repair and maintenance service. Aside from serving SBU TransJabodetabek units, this SBU serves other buses that needs maintenance.
