= List of Transjakarta corridors =

Public bus routes in Jakarta, Indonesia

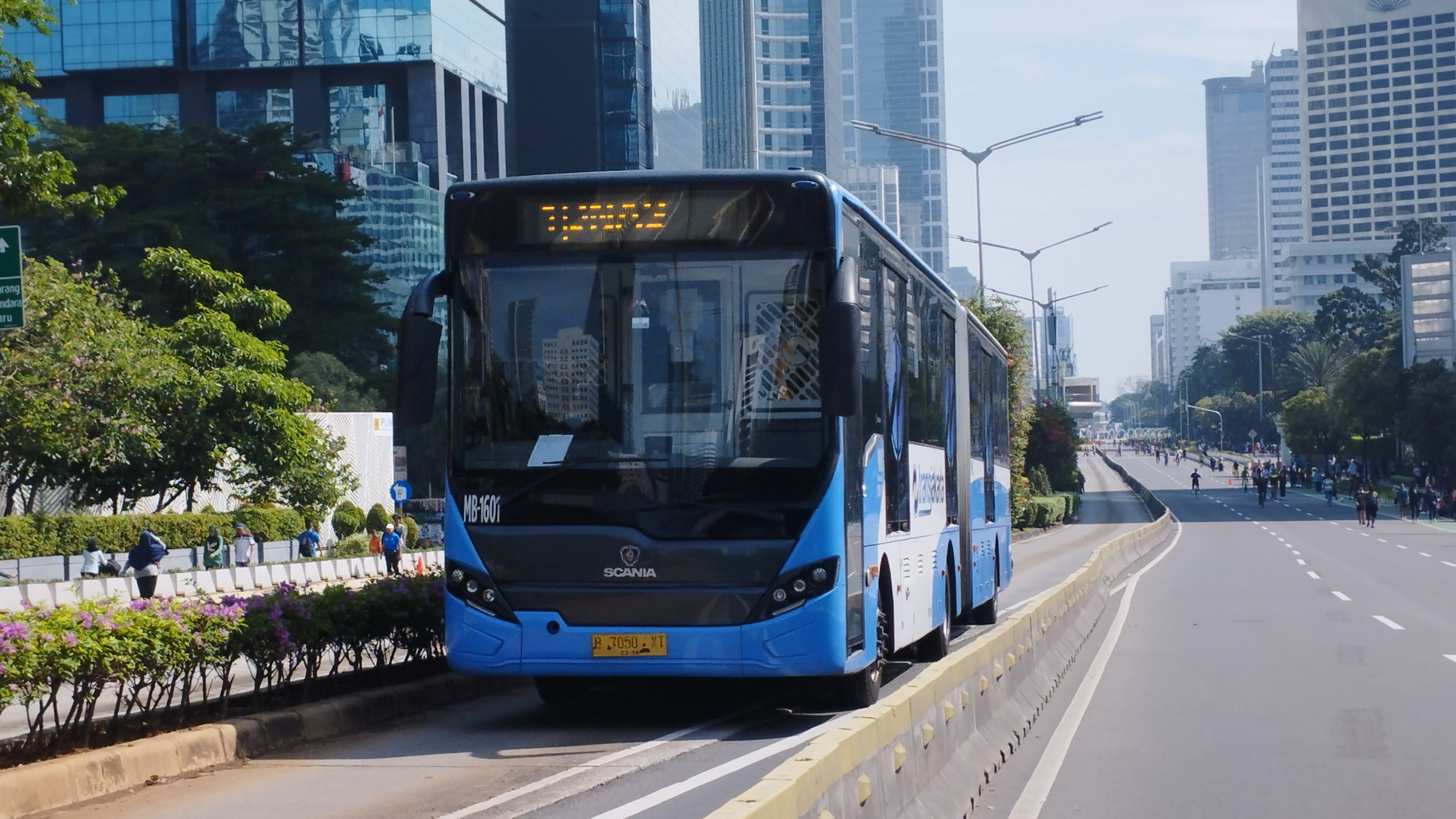
A Transjakarta bus fleet serving Corridor 1

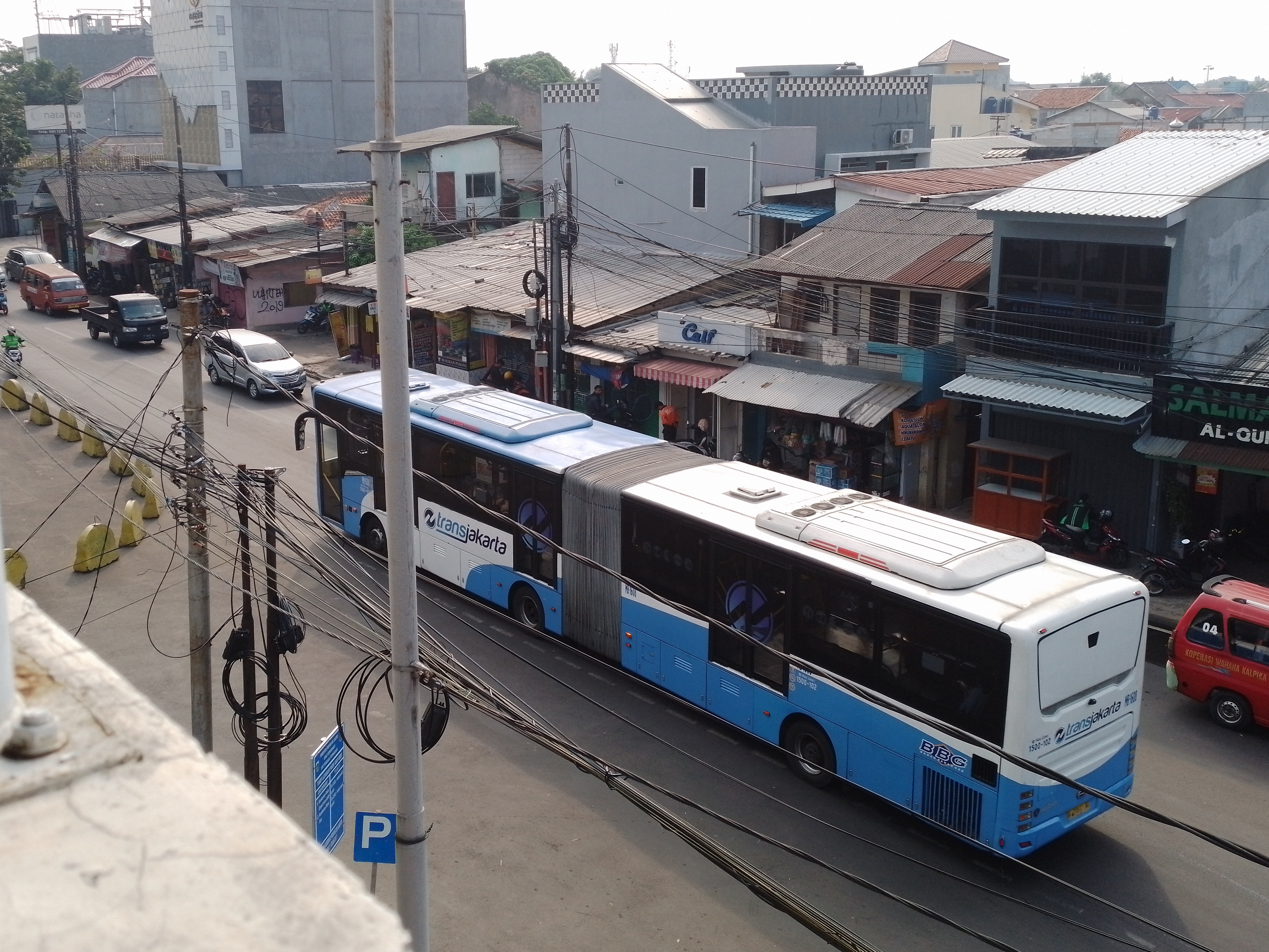
A Corridor 9 articulated bus departing from Pinang Ranti bus station in East Jakarta towards Pluit, North Jakarta. It is the longest BRT corridor of the system with a length of 28.8 km (17.9 mi)

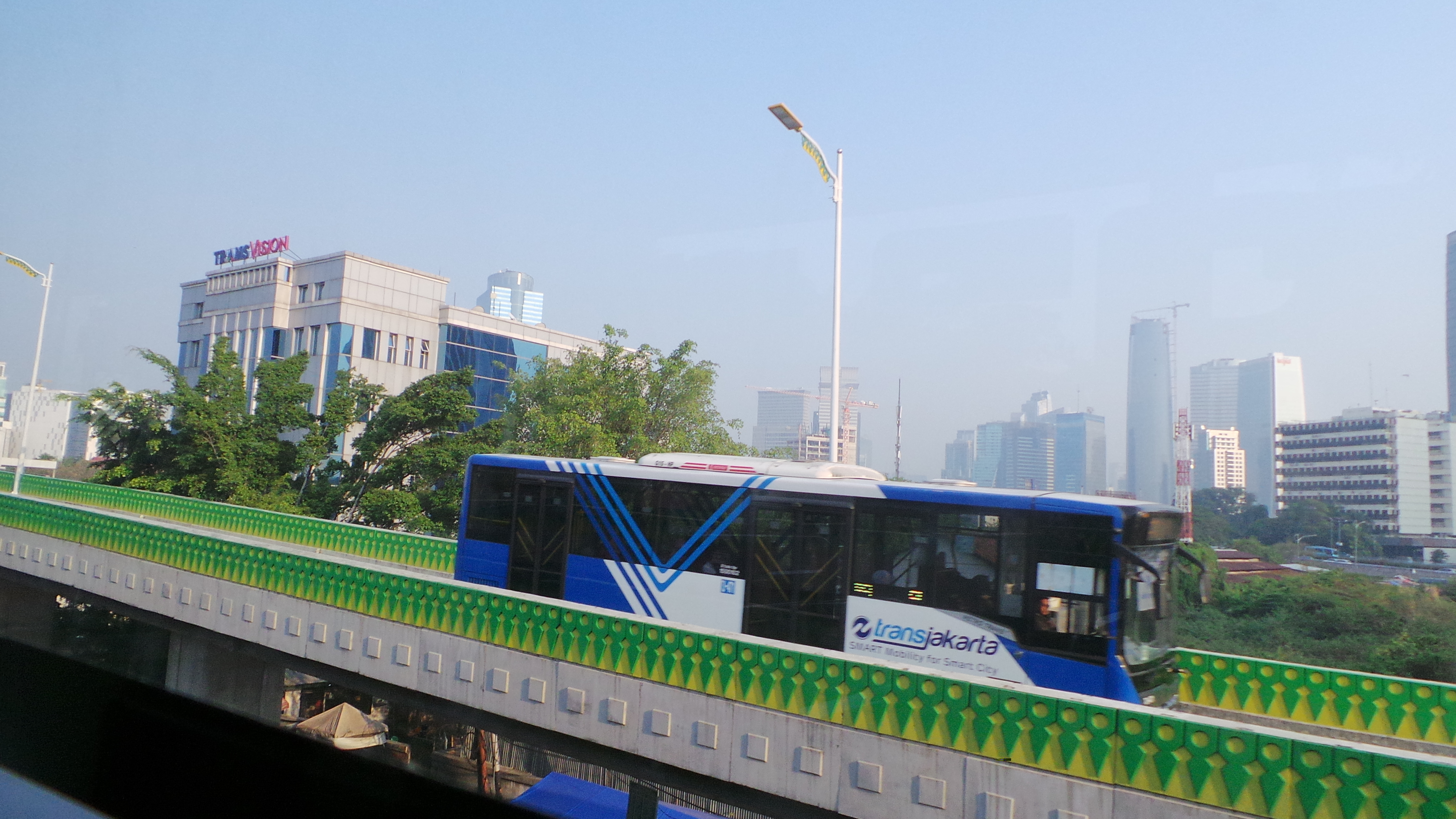
A Corridor 13 bus operating with its dedicated elevated track. It is the first and only corridor to use an elevated track.

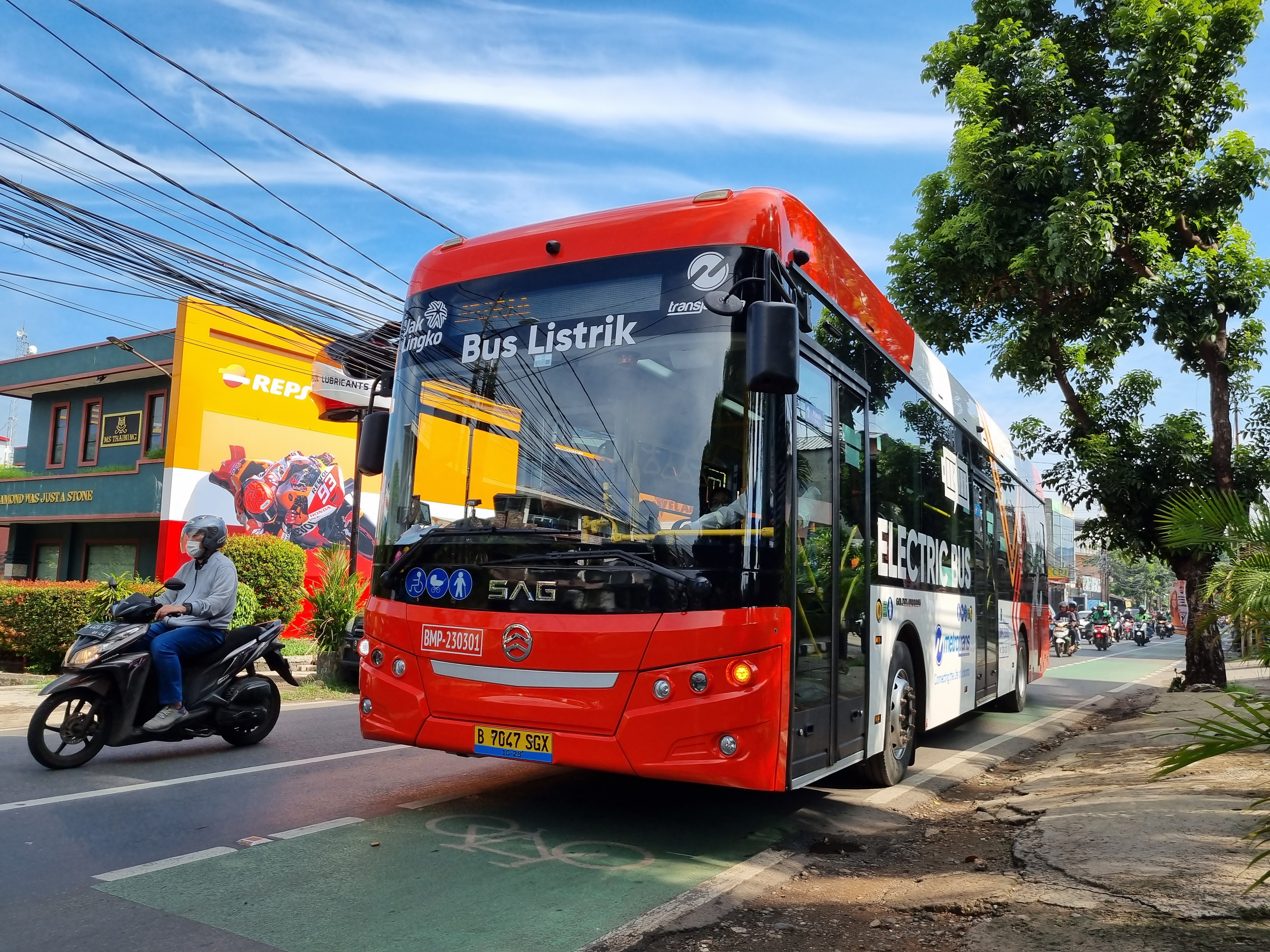
Apart from BRT services, there are numbers of non-BRT feeder routes on various service types.

The following is a list of public bus routes operating under the Transjakarta bus rapid transit system in Jakarta, Indonesia. In 2019, Transjakarta served 264.6 million passengers an increase of 40 percent from the year before. The first service route was opened in 2004, with thirteen new corridors following in the years after. Due to the notable traffic jams in the Jabodetabek area, the operational hours of both Transjakarta and KRL Commuterline have been steadily extended, especially since Jokowi became governor. Later on, Ahok and Anies Baswedan each made improvements to the Transjakarta system by funding for additional vehicles and opening new feeder (non-BRT) lines. During the Pramono Anung administration, network expansions are focused beyond the Jakarta city limit to connect with the neighboring satellite cities.

Transjakarta currently operates 14 BRT corridors, utilising dedicated bus lanes which are closed to normal vehicles. Transjakarta has the longest BRT network in the world, with the main BRT corridors length totaling 251.2 kilometres (156.1 mi). In addition to the BRT corridors, Transjakarta also operate 17 cross-corridor BRT routes, 59 inner city non-BRT routes, 18 cross-border non-BRT routes known as Transjabodetabek (with one route to the Soekarno–Hatta International Airport alternatively branded as Transbandara), 11 premium service Royaltrans non-BRT routes, 13 low-cost rental apartment feeder non-BRT routes, 4 free double-decker tour bus routes and 96 Mikrotrans (angkot feeder) routes. The 14 main BRT corridors have dedicated bus lanes separated from mixed traffic in most sections of their route, allowing them to speed through traffic congestion. The cross-corridor BRT and non-BRT feeder services are capable of using the dedicated lanes for a length of the route, however they also operate as a standard public bus service using normal road lanes, partly due to some buses (such as the Metrotrans branded buses) lacking the raised doors for use at the BRT stations and the inability to reserve lanes through more established areas.

Almost all Transjakarta services operate from 05.00 to 22.00. The night-time service that is called AMARI (Angkutan malam hari or night transport) operate from 22.00 to 05:00 in all main BRT corridors and select Mikrotrans feeder routes. AMARI corridors pass through the same route and stop at all the same stations as each's daytime counterpart, except Corridor 12 (late-night service only serves Penjaringan–Sunter Kelapa Gading, with omitted stations being served by Corridors 9 and 10) and Corridor 13 (CBD Ciledug BRT station closes at night). Though it is branded a bus rapid transit system, some main corridors have sections that lack dedicated bus lanes, for example, the Corridor 2 extension into Bekasi city (the first line to extend past the city limit, but since has been converted to a non-BRT service), negatively impacting the headway. Corridor 13 is the only main BRT corridor to cross the administrative border of Jakarta, with three of its easternmost stations located in city of Tangerang.

In December 2015, the Institute for Transportation and Development Policy (ITDP) announced that 6 corridors out of the then 12 corridors won bronze category in the international standards. There are 4 standard categories, being Basic Bus Rapid Transit (BRT), Bronze BRT, Silver BRT and Gold BRT. The six corridors to achieve the category were Corridor 1 (Blok M–Kota), Corridor 2 (Pulogadung–Harmoni, now Pulo Gadung – Monumen Nasional), Corridor 3 (Kalideres–Pasar Baru, now Kalideres–Monumen Nasional), Corridor 5 (Ancol–Kampung Melayu), Corridor 6 (Ragunan–Dukuh Atas, now Ragunan–Galunggung), and Corridor 9 (Pinang Ranti–Pluit).

== Main BRT corridors ==
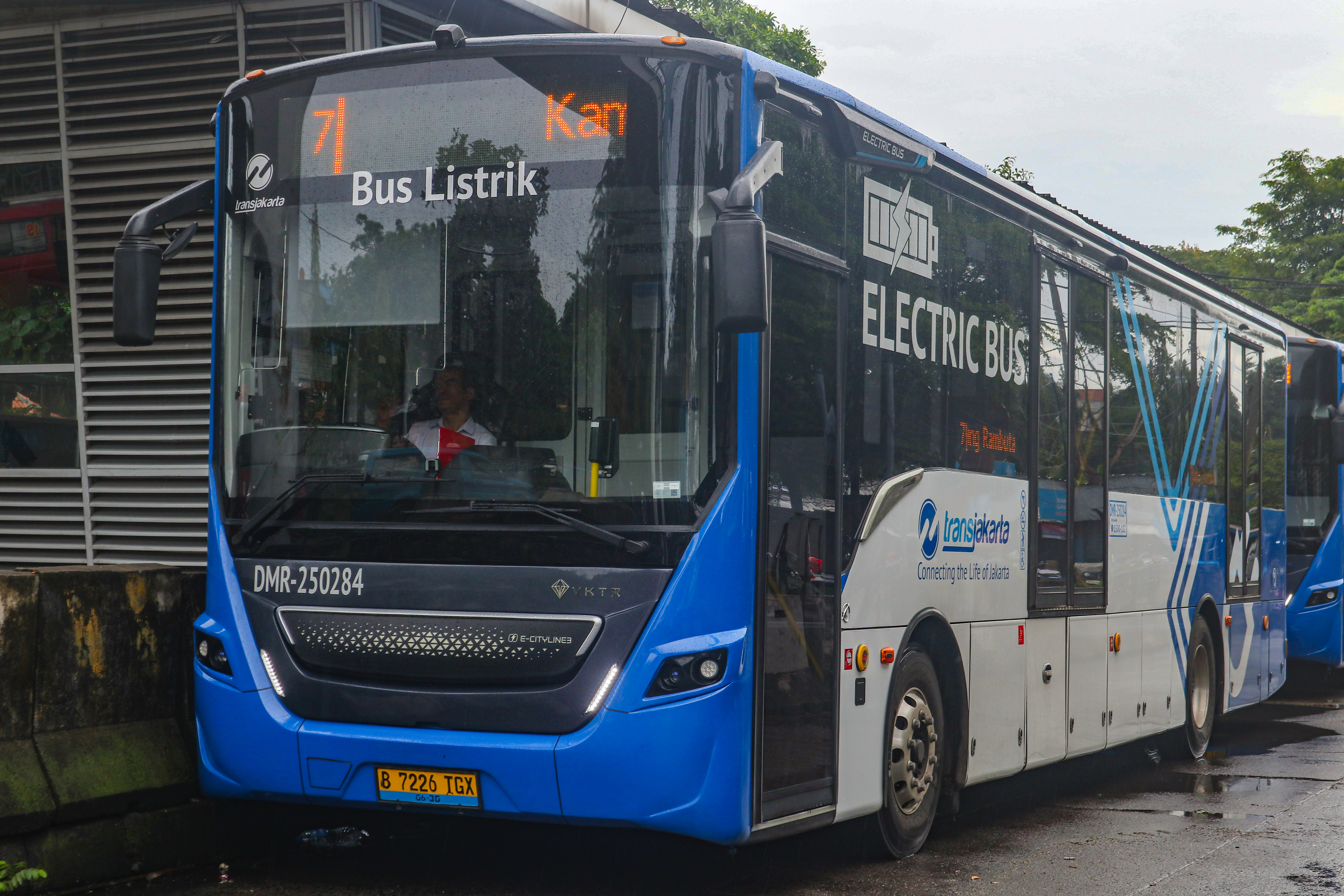
A corridor 7 electric bus fleet in Kampung Rambutan Transjakarta shelter

Transjakarta serves 14 operational main BRT corridors with 5 more are planned. All main BRT corridors use high-floor BRT stations and high-floor BRT buses. The first corridor, Corridor 1, began operation at February 2004. The latest, Corridor 14, started operation in November 2023. All main BRT corridors run 24 hours a day (as opposed to 05:00-22:00 for most other Transjakarta services). Services that run between 22:00-05:00 are called AMARI (Angkutan Malam Hari). All stations (except Corridor 13's CBD Ciledug) open 24 hours a day and all main corridors serving the same stations and route round the clock (except Corridors 12 and 13 which are cut short during AMARI hours).

=== Current corridors ===
Corridor #	Origin-Destination	Length of Line	Opened	BRT Standard (2014)
Transjakarta Corridor 1	Blok M – Kota	15,48 km	January 15, 2004	Silver
Transjakarta Corridor 2	Pulo Gadung – Monumen Nasional	17,88 km	January 15, 2006	Bronze
Transjakarta Corridor 3	Kalideres – Monumen Nasional	16,14 km	January 15, 2006	Bronze
Transjakarta Corridor 4	Pulo Gadung – Galunggung	12,33 km	January 27, 2007	Bronze
Transjakarta Corridor 5	Ancol – Kampung Melayu	13,58 km	January 27, 2007	Bronze
Transjakarta Corridor 6	Ragunan – Galunggung	15,90 km	January 27, 2007	Bronze
Transjakarta Corridor 7	Kampung Rambutan – Kampung Melayu	12,57 km	January 27, 2007	Basic BRT
Transjakarta Corridor 8	Lebak Bulus – Pasar Baru	25,33 km	February 21, 2009	Basic BRT
Transjakarta Corridor 9	Pinang Ranti – Pluit	31,57 km	December 31, 2010	Basic BRT
Transjakarta Corridor 10	Tanjung Priok – PGC	19,11 km	December 31, 2010	Basic BRT
Transjakarta Corridor 11	Pulo Gebang – Kampung Melayu	13,86 km	December 28, 2011	Basic BRT
Transjakarta Corridor 12	Pluit – Tanjung Priok	23,30 km	February 14, 2013	Basic BRT
Transjakarta Corridor 13	CBD Ciledug – Tegal Mampang	14,18 km	August 14, 2017	Basic BRT
Transjakarta Corridor 14	JIS – Senen Toyota Rangga	9,7 km	November 11, 2023	Basic BRT
System map
Current Transjakarta network map

=== Future corridors ===
- Corridor (Jakarta International Stadium – Pulo Gebang)
- Corridor 16 (Kampung Melayu –Tanah Abang – Harmoni via Jl. Layang Satrio)
- Corridor 17 (Stasiun Kota – Tanjung Priok via Ancol)
- Corridor 18 (Puri Kembangan – Pluit via PIK)
- Corridor 19 (Manggarai – Universitas Indonesia)

== Cross-corridor BRT routes ==
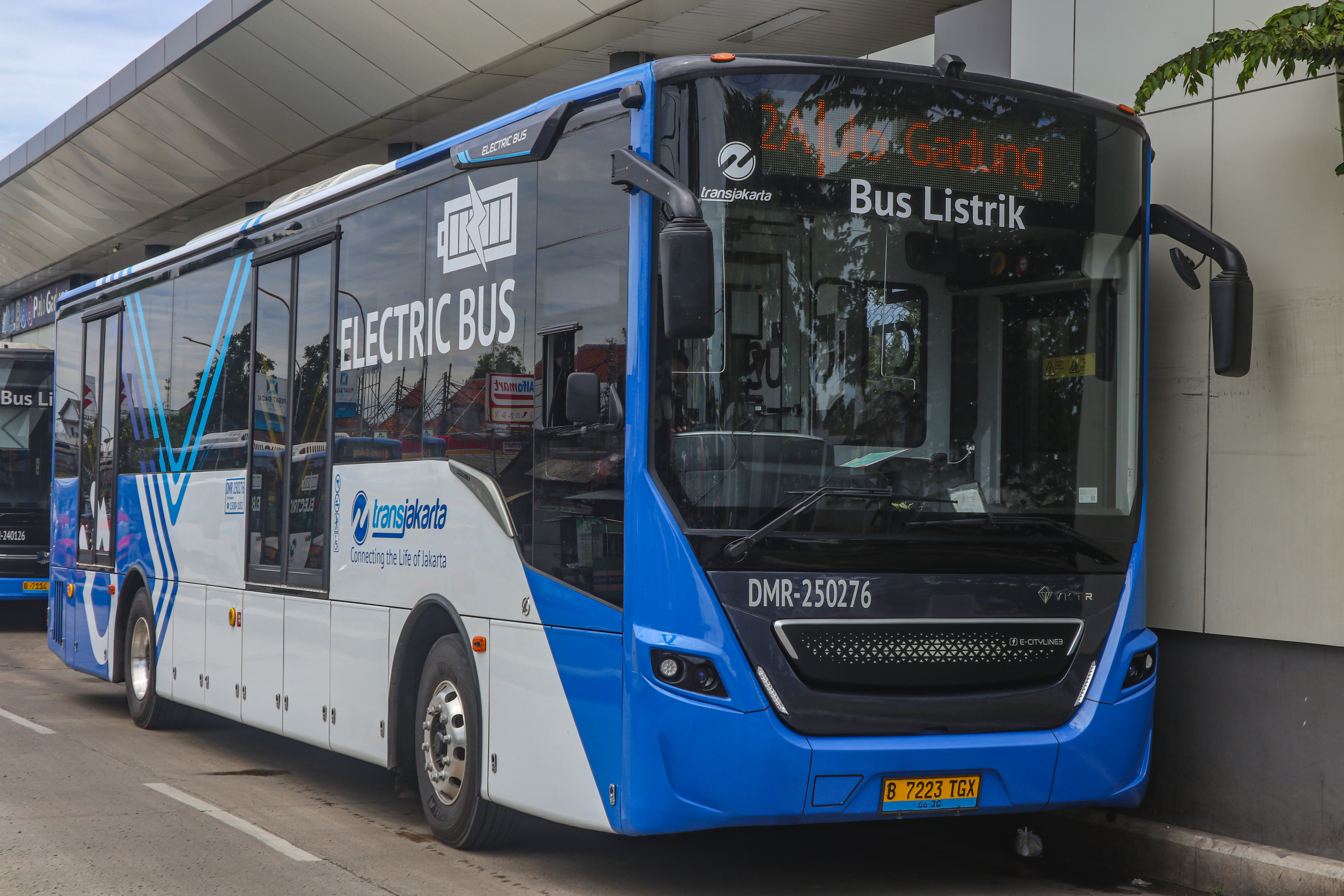
A Transjakarta Electric bus serving Corridor 2A (Pulo Gadung - Rawa Buaya)

As with the regular corridors, Transjakarta operates cross-corridor BRT routes (also called express-corridors or union-corridors), aiming at narrowing the headway of some corridors and assisting transfers to some corridors with few interchange stations or integration with other corridors. As of July 2026, the routes include:

Route	Origin-Destination	Operational days		Operational hours (UTC+07:00)		References
Route	Origin-Destination	Weekdays (Monday–Friday)	Weekends (Saturday and Sunday) and public holidays	Operational hours (UTC+07:00)		References
List of Transjakarta corridors#Cross-corridor routes	Pulo Gadung – Rawa Buaya	Yes	Yes	05:00–22:00		
List of Transjakarta corridors#Cross-corridor routes	Kalideres – Senayan Bank Jakarta	Yes	Yes	05:00–22:00		
List of Transjakarta corridors#Cross-corridor routes	Damai – Kota	Yes	Yes	05:00–22:00		
List of Transjakarta corridors#Cross-corridor routes	Pulo Gadung – Patra Kuningan	Yes	Yes	05:00–22:00		
List of Transjakarta corridors#Cross-corridor routes	Cililitan – Juanda (also listed as PGC – Monumen Nasional)	Yes	Yes	05:00–22:00		
List of TransJakarta corridors#Cross-corridor routes	Ragunan – Balai Kota via Kuningan	Yes	Yes	05:00–22:00		
List of TransJakarta corridors#Cross-corridor routes	Ragunan – Balai Kota via Semanggi	Yes	Yes	05:00–22:00		
List of TransJakarta corridors#Cross-corridor routes	Ragunan – Senayan Bank Jakarta	Yes	Yes	05:00–22:00		
List of TransJakarta corridors#Cross-corridor routes	Kampung Rambutan – Juanda via Cempaka Putih	Yes	Yes	05:00–09:00 (morning peak)	15:00–21:00 (night peak)	
List of TransJakarta corridors#Cross-corridor routes	Cililitan – Grogol Reformasi	Yes	Yes	05:00–22:00		
List of TransJakarta corridors#Cross-corridor routes	Pinang Ranti – Bundaran Senayan	Yes	Yes	05:00–22:00		
List of TransJakarta corridors#Cross-corridor routes	Pinang Ranti – Simpang Cawang	No	Yes	05:00–22:00		
List of TransJakarta corridors#Cross-corridor routes	Tanjung Priok – Bundaran Senayan	Yes	Yes	05:00–22:00		
List of TransJakarta corridors#Cross-corridor routes	Puri Beta 2 – Pancoran	Yes	Yes	05:00–22:00		
List of TransJakarta corridors#Cross-corridor routes	Puri Beta 2 – Flyover Kuningan (express) (Note: Route L13E is an express service of route 13E, with the latter stopping at 23 BRT stations. The express service skips 8 stations along the elevated track of corridor 13, so L13E only stops at 15 stations. Starting from 23 November 2024, L13E only runs on weekdays, with regular service 13E becoming operational as a replacement on weekends and public holidays.)	Yes	No	05:00–22:00		
List of TransJakarta corridors#Cross-corridor routes	Puri Beta 2 – Flyover Kuningan	No	Yes	05:00–22:00		

== Non-BRT feeder routes ==
Transjakarta has feeder bus service that run on the ordinary roads beyond the exclusive bus lanes and stop at regular pedestrian bus stops instead of dedicated BRT stations, called "Non-BRT" services. These are divided into two categories:

- Partially-integrated into BRT, officially called "Non-BRT Integrasi" (lit. "Integrated Non-BRT"). These routes stop at both BRT stations and pedestrian bus stops. The bus runs in a dedicated bus lane when running between BRT stations, but also runs on ordinary roads when stopping at pedestrian bus stops. Passengers boarding or alighting at a bus stop taps to pay on the bus, while those boarding or alighting at the BRT station taps to pay on the BRT station's gate, with ability to alight and board from a mix of both and transfer to BRT or other integrated non-BRT route directly from BRT station without paying again. Most of these routes are served by small high-floor buses called Minitrans, though some also use medium high-floor standard BRT buses.
- Fully-disintegrated from BRT, officially called "Non-BRT". These routes only stop at pedestrian bus stops with no integration into BRT, thus the bus runs exclusively on regular roads and not dedicated bus lanes. As all passengers board and alight at bus stops, all payment taps are done on the bus and all transfers between routes, including to another non-BRT by entering BRT station, require passengers to tap and pay again. Disintegrated non-BRT routes use Minitrans small high-floor buses and medium low-floor buses named Metrotrans.

=== Inner city feeder ===
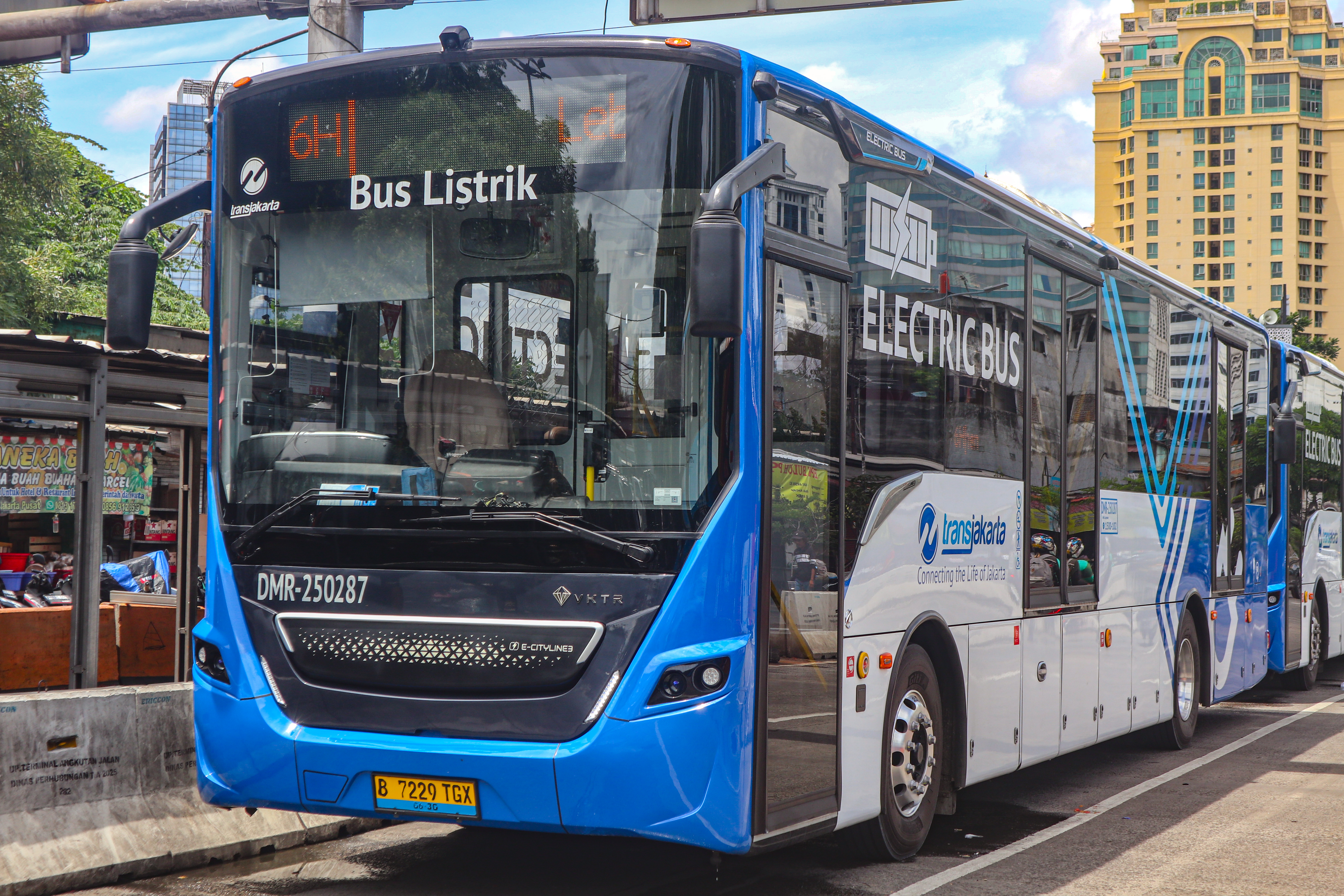
A Transjakarta BYD HF-12 Tidar Electric bus operated by Perum DAMRI serving Corridor 6H (Lebak Bulus - Senen)

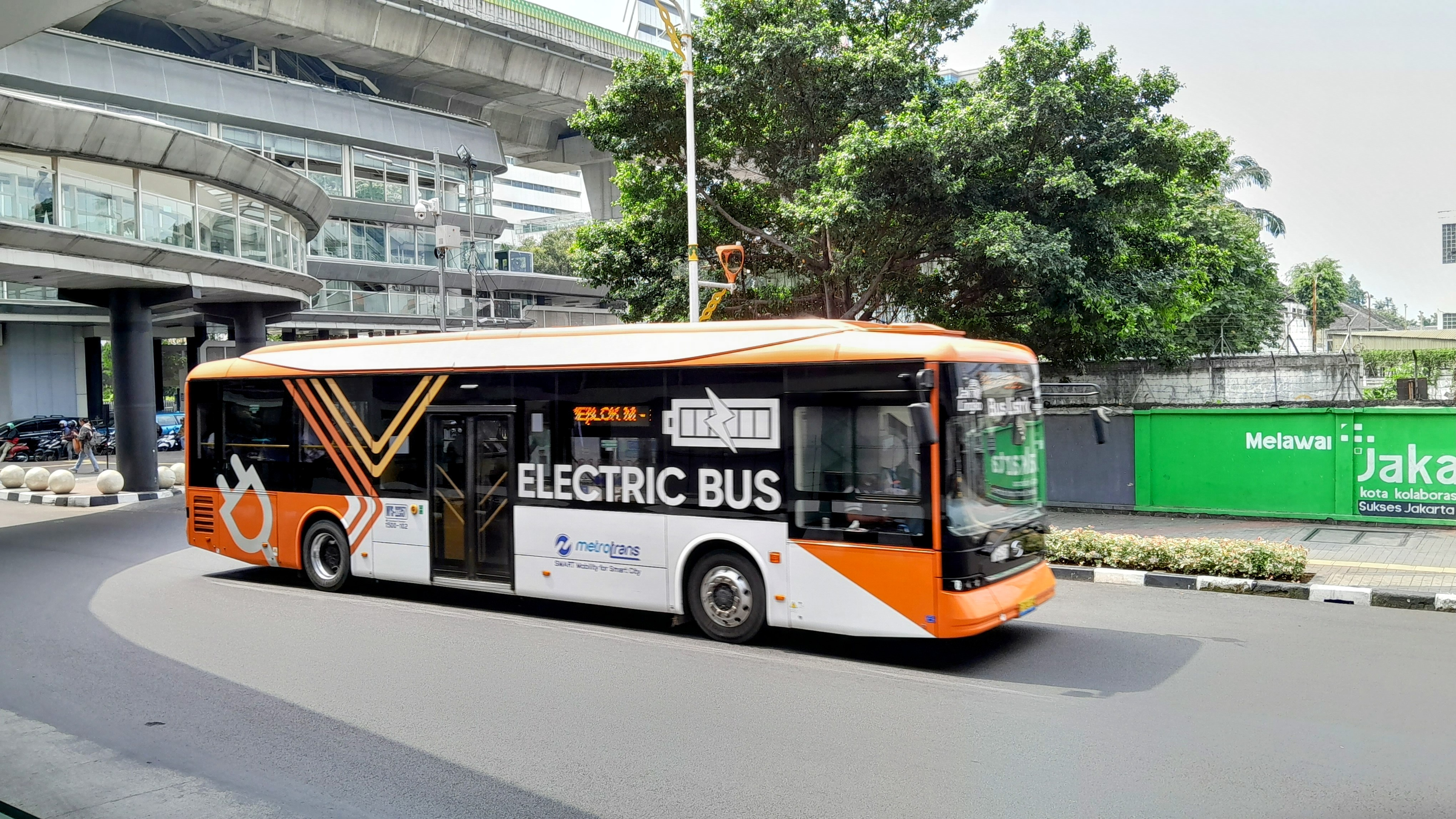
A Metrotrans BYD B12 electric bus serving corridor 1E (Blok M - Pondok Labu)

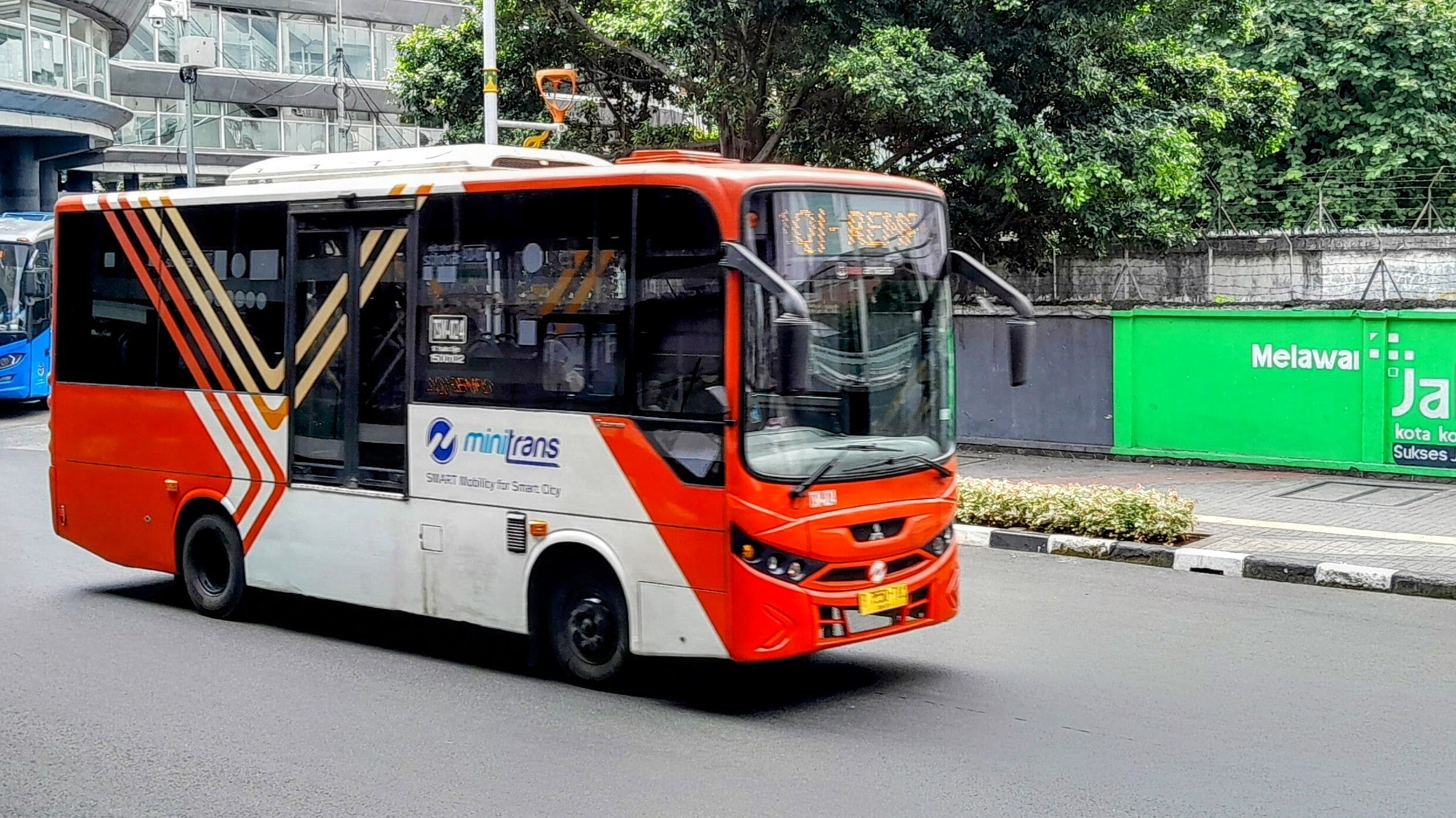
A Minitrans Mitsubishi FE 84G BC bus serving corridor 1Q (Blok M - Rempoa)

Previously named Bus Kota Terintegrasi Busway/BKTB (Busway Integrated City Bus), the inner city feeder bus network serves for middle to upper-economy passengers in certain satellite districts in Jakarta. Outside the dedicated Transjakarta busway lanes, passengers can board these buses using standard bus stops without the need for raised platforms. These routes were mainly operated by Kopaja, however since the introduction of a new Transjakarta low-entry bus fleet, operating under the name Metrotrans, the routes can be operated by any appointed Transjakarta contractor. Some routes are also operated by special buses with both kerb-level entry and busway-level entry, either operated by Kopaja with their buses under the Transjakarta brand, or by a specialised Transjakarta fleet operating under the name Minitrans.

Pantai Indah Kapuk – Monas BKTB is the first inner city feeder route opened in 2014, which is also integrated with corridors 1 and 12. Starting on January 4, 2016, all 6 BKTB buses would be replaced by 20 mid-size buses like Kopaja buses with the tariff is decreased to Rp 3,500 (from Rp 6,000 previously), the same as other Transjakarta regular buses tariff. The route is also extended to Pantai Indah Kapuk – Waduk Pluit – Monas – Balai Kota and renamed as Route 1A until present day. Starting on April 23, 2024, the route operates from 05:00 to 23:00, unlike other routes that mostly available until 22:00.

List of Transjakarta inner-city feeder routes
Route	Origin-Destination	Integration with BRT	Operational days		Operational hours (UTC+07:00)		Reference
Route	Origin-Destination	Integration with BRT	Weekdays (Monday–Friday)	Weekends (Saturday and Sunday) and public holidays	Operational hours (UTC+07:00)		Reference
	Pantai Maju – Balai Kota	Yes	Yes	Yes	05:00–23:00		
	Pesanggrahan – Blok M	Yes	Yes	Yes	05:00–22:00		
	Pondok Labu – Blok M	No	Yes	Yes	05:00–22:00		
	Meruya – Blok M	Yes	Yes	Yes	05:00–22:00		
	Senen – Blok M	No	Yes	Yes	05:00–22:00		
	Rempoa – Blok M	Yes	Yes	Yes	05:00 (both directions)	21:15 (from Rempoa) 22:00 (from Blok M)	
	Blok M – Ancol	Yes	Yes	Yes	05:00–22:00		
	Harapan Indah – Pulo Gadung	Yes	Yes	Yes	05:00 (both directions)	22:00 (from Harapan Indah) 22:15 (from Pulo Gadung)	
	Taman Kota – Penjaringan via Tubagus Angke	Yes	Yes	Yes	05:00–21:00		
	Sentraland Cengkareng – Puri Kembangan	Yes	Yes	Yes	05:00–22:00		
	JIEP Pulogadung – Bundaran Senayan	No	Yes	Yes	05:00 (both directions)	21:15 (from JIEP) 22:00 (from Bundaran Senayan)	
	Pulo Gadung – Pinang Ranti	No	Yes	Yes	05:00–22:00		
	Pulo Gadung – Kejaksaan Agung	Yes	Yes	Yes	05:00 (both directions)	21:00 (from Pulo Gadung) 22:00 (from Kejaksaan Agung)	
	Kampung Melayu – Tanah Abang	No	Yes	Yes	05:00–22:00		
	Kampung Melayu – Tanah Abang via Cikini	No	Yes	Yes	05:00 (both directions)	21:00 (from Kampung Melayu) 22:00 (from Tanah Abang)	
	Kampung Melayu – Ragunan	Yes	Yes	Yes	05:00–21:30		
	Lebak Bulus – Senen	Yes	Yes	Yes	05:00–22:00		
	Kuningan – Karet	Yes	Yes	Yes	05:00–22:00		
	Ragunan – Blok M via Kemang	Yes	Yes	Yes	05:00–22:00		
	Dukuh Atas (Galunggung) – Casablanca via Epicentrum	No	Yes	Yes	05:00 (both directions)	21:00 (from Dukuh Atas) 21:20 (from Casablanca)	
	Pasar Minggu – Velbak via Jeruk Purut	No	Yes	Yes	05:00–22:00		
	Blok M – Pasar Minggu	Yes	Yes	Yes	05:00–22:00		
	Blok M – Duren Tiga via Bangka Raya	Yes	Yes	Yes	05:00–21:30		
	Kampung Rambutan – Lebak Bulus	No	Yes	Yes	05:00 (both directions)	21:00 (from Kampung Rambutan) 21:45 (from Lebak Bulus)	
	Kampung Rambutan – Blok M	Yes	Yes	Yes	05:00–22:00		
	Cibubur – Cawang Cililitan	Yes	Yes	Yes	05:00 (both directions)	21:30 (from Cibubur) 22:00 (from Cawang Cililitan)	
	TMII – Pancoran	Yes	Yes	Yes	05:00–22:00		
	Kampung Rambutan – Ragunan	Yes	Yes	Yes	05:00 (both directions)	21:00 (from Kampung Rambutan) 22:00 (from Ragunan)	
	Pondok Kelapa – Cawang Cililitan	Yes	Yes	Yes	05:00 (from Pondok Kelapa) 05:30 (from Cawang Cililitan)	21:30 (from Pondok Kelapa) 22:00 (from Cawang Cililitan)	
	Blok M – Cawang Cililitan	Yes	Yes	Yes	05:00 (from Blok M bound to Stasiun Duren Kalibata 1) 09:30 (from Cawang Cililitan)	22:00 (both directions)	
	Cibubur → Pluit	Yes	Yes	No	05:00–06:00 (one way from Cibubur only)		
	Cibubur → Tanjung Priok	Yes	Yes	No	05:15–06:15 (one way from Cibubur only)		
	Cibubur → Ancol	Yes	Yes	No	05:30–06:00 (one way from Cibubur only)		
	Cibubur – Kampung Rambutan	No	Yes	Yes	05:00–22:00		
	Meruya Selatan (Joglo) – Blok M	Yes	Yes	Yes	05:00 (both direcrions)	21:15 (from Joglo) 22:00 (from Blok M	
	Bintaro – Blok M	Yes	Yes	Yes	05:00 (both directions)	21:15 (from Bintaro) 22:00 (from Blok M)	
	Batusari – Grogol	Yes	Yes	Yes	05:00–22:00		
	Kebayoran – Petamburan via Asia-Afrika	Yes	Yes	Yes	05:00–22:00		
	Pasar Minggu – Tanah Abang	Yes	Yes	Yes	05:00–22:00		
	Kebayoran – Jelambar	Yes	Yes	Yes	05:00 (both directions)	21:00 (from Kebayoran) 21:30 (from Jelambar)	
	Pasar Minggu – Cipedak (Tanah Baru Depok)	No	Yes	Yes	05:00–22:00		
	Pulo Gebang – Pulo Gadung via Perkampungan Industri Kecil (PIK) Penggilingan	Yes	Yes	Yes	05:00–22:00		
	Pulo Gebang – Kampung Melayu via East Flood Canal (BKT)	Yes	Yes	Yes	05:00–22:00		
	Kota – Kaliadem	Yes	Yes	Yes	05:00–22:00		
	Pluit – Senen	Yes	Yes	Yes	05:00 (both directions)	21:00 (from Senen) 22:00 (from Pluit)	
	Jakarta International Stadium (JIS) – Monumen Nasional	Yes	Yes	Yes	05:00–22:00		
	Tanjung Priok – Senen via JIS	Yes	Yes	Yes	05:00–22:00		

=== Train station feeder ===
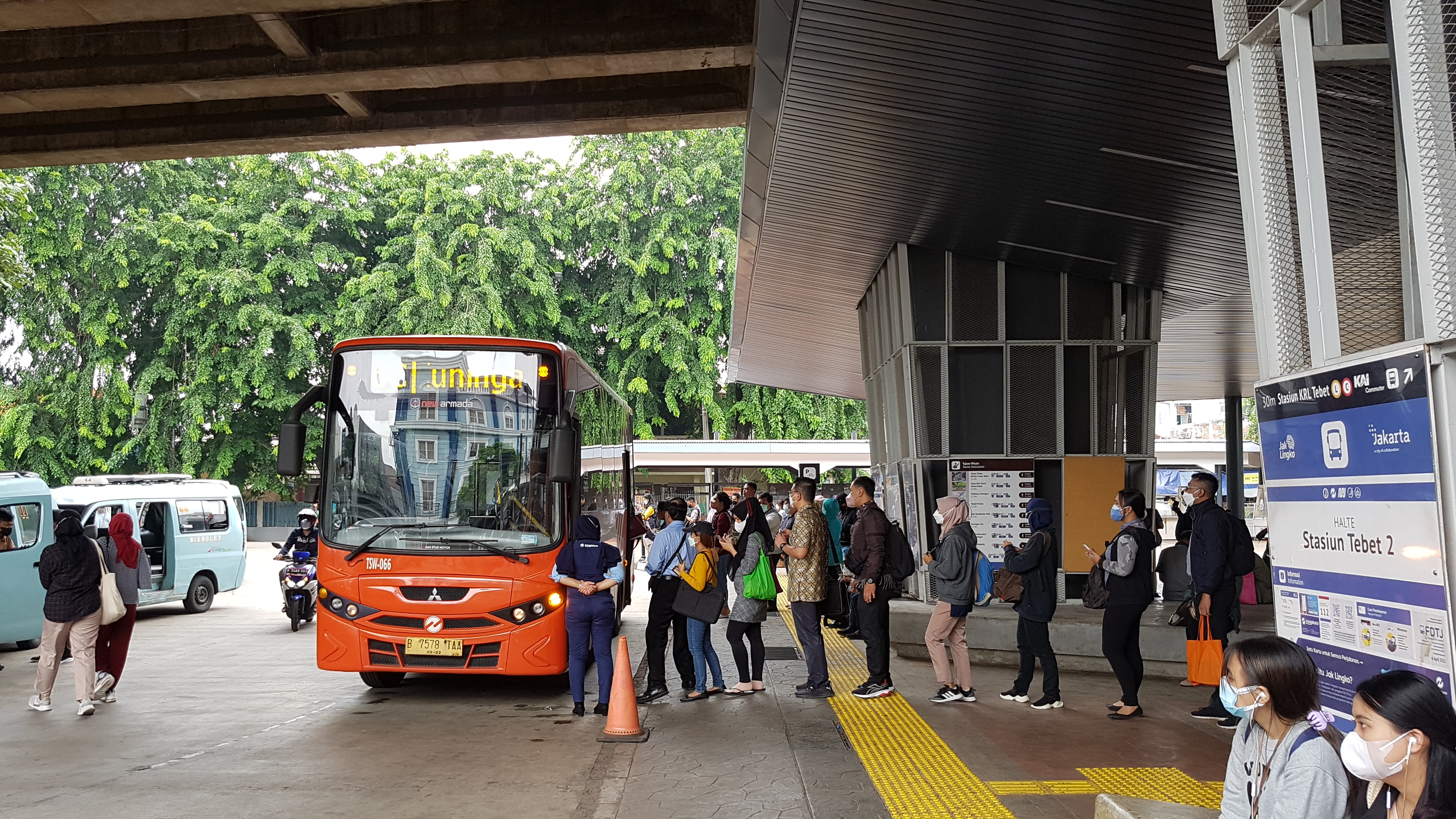
People queuing to board the Transjakarta Minitrans bus at Tebet railway station

The train station feeder network was launched on April 4, 2016, with four routes from Tebet railway station connecting 3 Transjakarta corridors. Routes to Corridor 6 operate through Saharjo flyover, Casablanca, Rasuna Said and Dr. Satrio, then turn back besides Sampoerna Strategic Square to return to Tebet Station. Routes to Corridors 5 and 7 operate through Kampung Melayu, connecting to Corridor 5, then through Jalan Jatinegara Barat, turning around to Kebon Pala and heading to Jalan Jatinegara Timur, Kampung Melayu Terminal, then passing through Corridor 7 and heading to Jalan Otista. It will then turn back at Bidara Cina to return to Tebet Station. There was no permanent Tebet bus station until September 2021, so buses start and terminate under Tebet flyover. Starting on April 14, 2016, train station feeder services operate from Pesing railway station to Indosiar (now Damai) BRT station, which now has become Route 3H classified as cross-corridor BRT. All train station feeder routes are classified as non-BRT routes, but some are partially integrated into BRT system while others are fully disintegrated from.

List of train station feeder routes
Route	Origin-Destination	Integration with BRT	Operational days		Operational hours (UTC+07:00)		Reference
Route	Origin-Destination	Integration with BRT	Weekdays (Monday–Friday)	Weekends (Saturday and Sunday) and public holidays	Operational hours (UTC+07:00)		Reference
	Palmerah Station – Dukuh Atas Transport Hub	Yes	Yes	Yes	05:00–22:00		
	Palmerah Station – Bundaran Senayan	Yes	Yes	Yes	05:00–22:00		
	Tanah Abang Station – Gondangdia Station	No	Yes	Yes	05:00–22:00		
	Tanah Abang Station – Senen	No	Yes	Yes	05:00–21:00		
	Gondangdia Station – Senen	No	Yes	Yes	05:00–22:00		
	Gondangdia Station – Balai Kota	No	Yes	Yes	05:00–22:00		
	Manggarai – Universitas Indonesia	No	Yes	Yes	05:00–22:00		
	Tebet Station – Bidara Cina	Yes	Yes	Yes	05:00–22:00		
	Tebet Station – Kuningan	Yes	Yes	Yes	05:00–22:00		
	Tebet Station – Bundaran Senayan	No	Yes	Yes	05:00–22:00		
	Blok M – Manggarai Station	Yes	Yes	Yes	05:00–22:00		
	Cawang – Halim HSR Station	No	Yes	Yes	05:00–22:00		
	Kebayoran – Tanah Abang Station	No	Yes	Yes	05:00 (both directions)	20:30 (from Kebayoran) 21:15 (from Tanah Abang)	
	Tanah Abang Station – Tanjung Duren	Yes	Yes	Yes	05:00–22:00		
	Klender Station – Pulo Gadung	No	Yes	No	05:00–22:00		
	Pegangsaan Dua LRT Station – Jakarta International Stadium	Yes	Yes	Yes	05:00–22:00		

=== Cross-border feeder ===
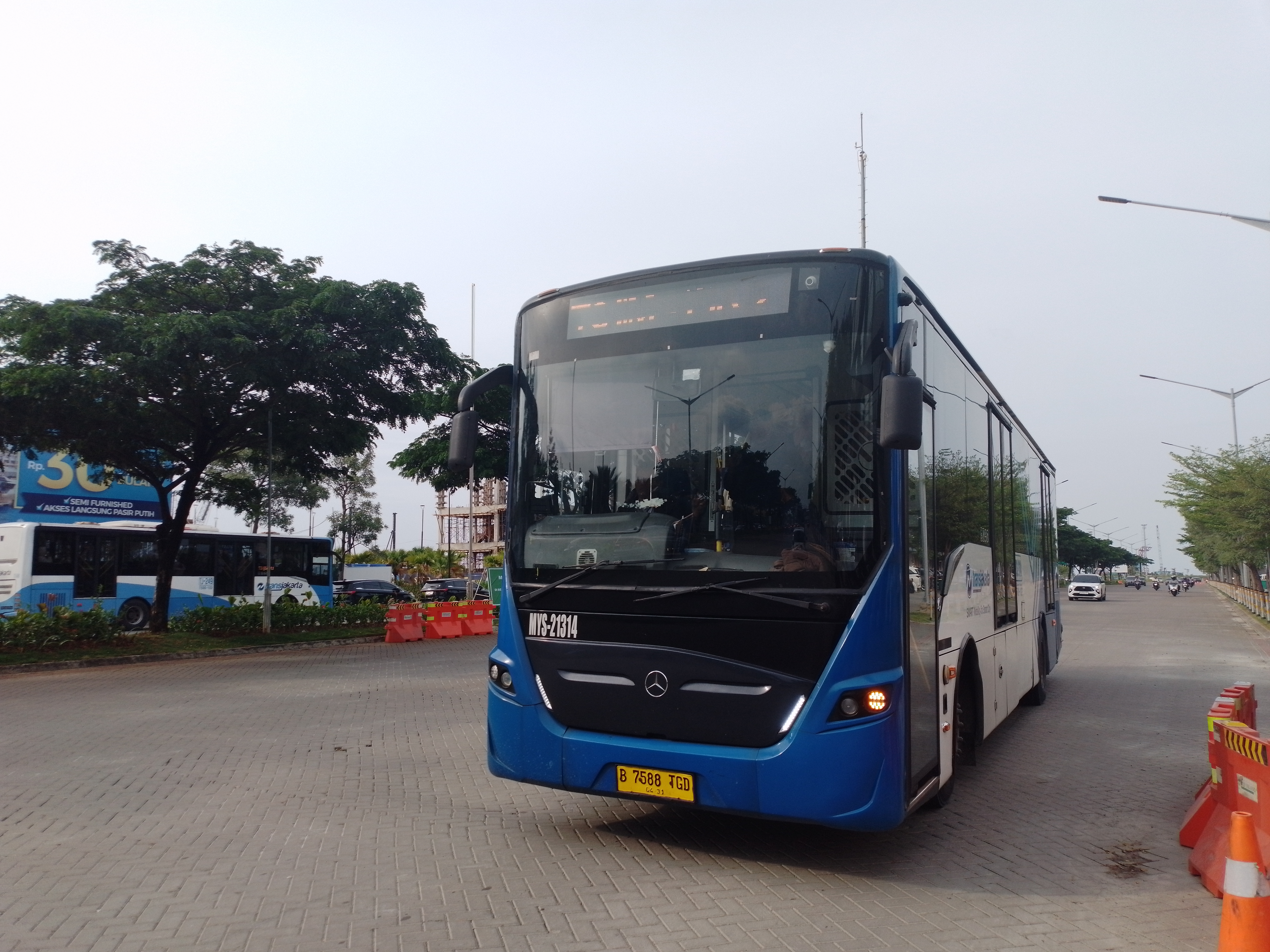
Transjakarta route T31 bus at Pantai Indah Kapuk

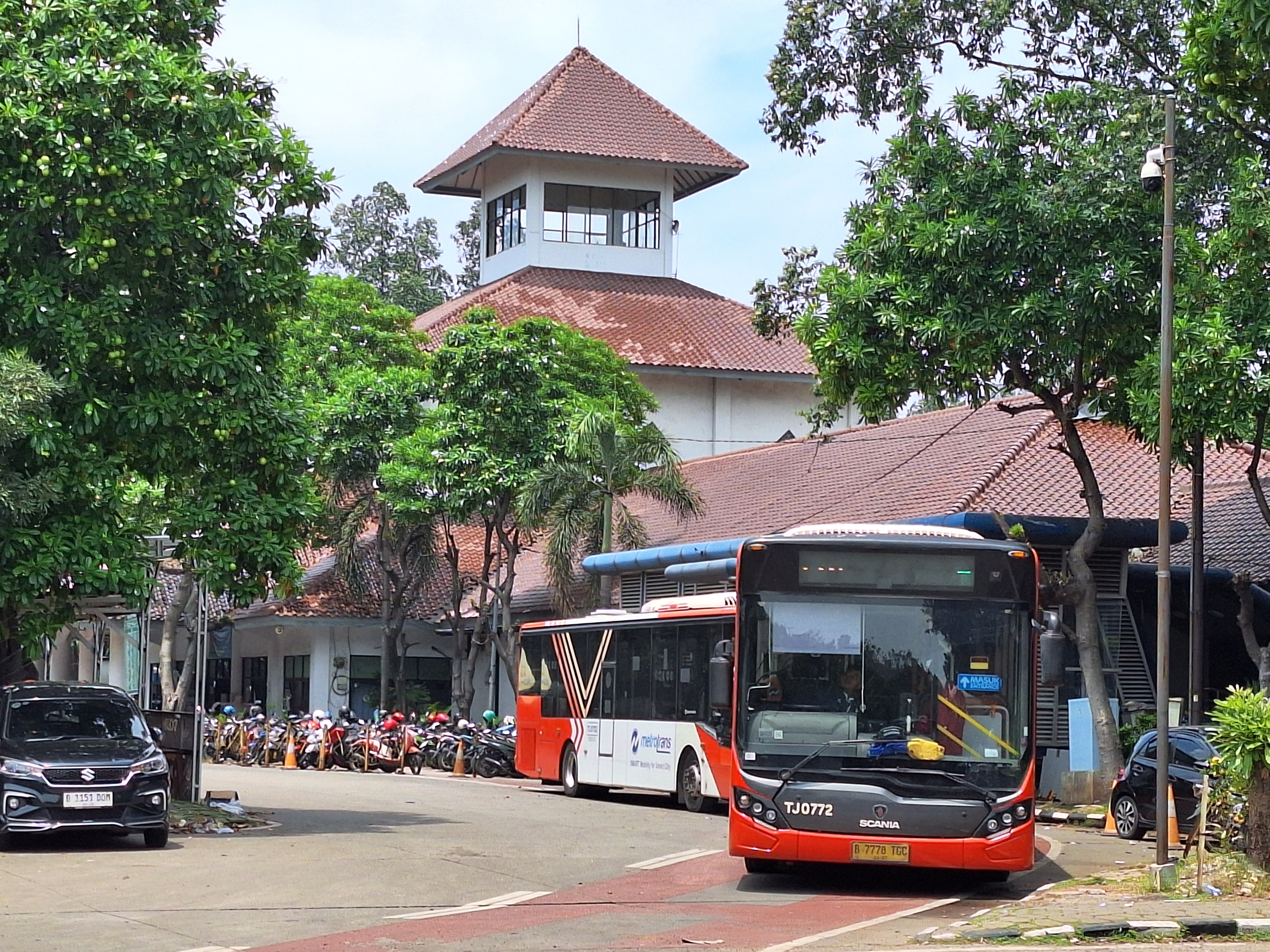
Transjakarta Metrotrans buses at the Poris Plawad bus terminal, Tangerang.

The cross-border feeder network connects several places of interest in Jakarta – including major and central stations of the main BRT corridors – with the neighboring satellite cities (targeting commuter residential area), as well as the Soekarno–Hatta International Airport (Soetta). It is commonly known as Transjabodetabek, although it also refers to a premium bus service – sometimes has a similar look to Transjakarta buses – operated by different bus companies. All the services are classified as non-BRT as all of Transjakarta's BRT stations (except Ciledug, Puri Beta 1, and Puri Beta 2) are located in Jakarta, but some are partially integrated into BRT while others are fully disintegrated. All 18 routes have designated prefix code based on the destination of each routes, such as:

- B for routes to Bekasi and Bekasi Regency
- D for Depok
- P for Bogor
- S for South Tangerang
- SH for Soekarno–Hatta International Airport
- T for Tangerang and Tangerang Regency

LIke most other Transjakarta services, the Transjabodetabek service is charged at IDR 3,500 with government subsidy, with the exception of route SH2 (Blok M – Soekarno–Hatta Airport) being charged at IDR 15,000.

List of cross-border (Transjabodetabek) feeder routes
Origin		Route	Origin-Destination	Integration with BRT	Operational days		Operational hours (UTC+07:00)		Reference
Origin		Route	Origin-Destination	Integration with BRT	Weekdays (Monday–Friday)	Weekends (Saturday and Sunday) and public holidays	Operational hours (UTC+07:00)		Reference
West Java	Bekasi		Summarecon Bekasi – Cawang	No	Yes	Yes	05:00–22:00		
West Java	Bekasi		Bekasi Timur – Cawang	No	Yes	Yes	05:00 (both directions)	21:00 (from Bekasi Timur) 21:30 (from Cawang)	
West Java	Bekasi		Bekasi Timur – Dukuh Atas (Galunggung) via Becakayu Toll Road	Yes	Yes	Yes	05:00–22:00		
West Java	Bekasi		Vida Bekasi – Cawang Sentral via Jatiasih	Yes	Yes	Yes	05:00–22:00		
West Java	Bekasi Regency		Cikarang Jababeka – Cawang Sentral	No	Yes	Yes	05:00–22:00		
West Java	Depok		Depok – Cawang Sentral via Cibubur	No	Yes	Yes	05:00 (both directions)	21:00 (from Depok) 22:00 (from Cawang Sentral)	
West Java	Depok		Universitas Indonesia – Lebak Bulus	No	Yes	Yes	05:00 (both directions)	21:00 (from Universitas Indonesia) 22:00 (from Lebak Bulus)	
West Java	Depok		Sawangan – Lebak Bulus via Depok–Antasari Toll Road	Yes	Yes	Yes	05:00–22:00		
West Java	Bogor		Bogor (Botani Square) – Blok M	Yes	Yes	Yes	05:00–22:00		
Banten	South Tangerang		BSD City – Jelambar	No	Yes	Yes	05:00 (both directions)	20:30 (from BSD City) 22:00 (from Jelambar)	
Banten	South Tangerang		Ciputat – CSW (M Bloc Space)	No	Yes	Yes	05:00 (both directions)	21:15 (from Ciputat) 22:00 (from M Bloc)	
Banten	South Tangerang		Ciputat – Kampung Rambutan	No	Yes	Yes	05:00–22:00		
Banten	South Tangerang		Alam Sutera – Blok M	Yes	Yes	Yes	05:00–22:00		
Banten	Soekarno–Hatta International Airport (Tangerang)		Kalideres – Soekarno–Hatta International Airport (Perkantoran Soekarno–Hatta)	No	Yes	Yes	05:00 (both directions)	22:00 (from Kalideres) 23:00 (from Perkantoran Soekarno–Hatta)	
Banten	Soekarno–Hatta International Airport (Tangerang)		Blok M – Soekarno–Hatta International Airport (Perkantoran Soekarno–Hatta)	No	Yes	Yes	05:00–22:00		
Banten	Tangerang		Poris Plawad – Petamburan	No	Yes	Yes	05:00 (both directions)	22:00 (from Poris Plawad) 22:30 (from Petamburan)	
Banten	Tangerang		Poris Plawad – Juanda	No	Yes	Yes	05:00 (both directions)	21:00 (from Poris Plawad) 22:00 (from Juanda)	
Banten	Tangerang Regency		Pantai Indah Kapuk 2 – Blok M	Yes	Yes	Yes	05:00–22:00		

==== Initial routes ====
The cross-border feeders were initially launched on August 24, 2015, with routes from Ciputat – Blok M (launched on October 1, 2014, currently operating as corridor S21 (Ciputat – CSW)), Harapan Indah Bekasi–Pasar Baru, and Poris Plawad Tangerang–Kemayoran. The buses were provided with a smartcard validator, a passenger counter and a GPS.

On April 25, 2016, Transjakarta launched 3 new corridors from and towards Bekasi: Bekasi MM–Bundaran HI (now B11, Summarecon Bekasi–Cawang), Bekasi MM–Tanjung Priok (closed), and Bekasi Timur–Grogol (now B21, shortened to Cawang). On August 10, routes to Bekasi MM were extended to Summarecon Bekasi (although in some maps are still referred to as Bekasi Barat).

On May 26, 2016, Transjakarta launched 2 new corridors from Tangerang to Jakarta vice versa. There are Poris Plawad Terminal – Bundaran Senayan (now route T11, shortened to Petamburan) and Poris Plawad Terminal – Pasar Baru (now route T12, shortened to Juanda BRT station). On June 6, Transjakarta launched the BSD City–Slipi (now route S11, shortened to Jelambar) route that connects Jakarta with South Tangerang, particularly the Serpong region.

On June 20, 2016, Transjakarta launched a new corridor from Terminal Margonda (Depok) to Cawang UKI BRT station (now Cawang Sentral) vice versa. The route passes through Margonda Raya and Juanda streets of Depok, Cijago and Jagorawi toll roads, exit at Cibubur and Cililitan, and then terminates at Cawang UKI. But starting on July 19, 2016, Transjakarta is also (only) pass Cibubur toll gate. Bus stops from Depok are Harjamukti LRT station and Cibubur Junction and the bus stop from Cawang is Buperta Cibubur.

==== Further expansions in 2025-26 ====
In 2025, the Jakarta Provincial Government under Governor Pramono Anung has initiated a broader expansion of the Transjabodetabek network. It includes new routes to Tangerang Regency (Pantai Indah Kapuk 2), Bogor, Bogor Regency (Bojong Gede and Kota Wisata), and Bekasi Regency, which has numerous commuter residences, but with poor public transport access. On April 24, 2025, route S61 (Alam Sutera–Blok M) was launched as part of the first phase of expansion, followed by route B41 (Vida Bekasi–Cawang Sentral) on May 15, and route T31 (Pantai Indah Kapuk 2–Blok M) a week later. On June 4, route D41 (Sawangan–Lebak Bulus) was commenced. On the next day, route P11 from Blok M to Bogor was launched, becoming the first one to reach Bogor city (although it also covers its Regency counterpart by providing stops in Citeureup, Sentul International Circuit and Sentul City along the Jagorawi Toll Road). On July 3, route B25 (Bekasi–Galunggung) was commenced.

On February 11, 2026, route B51 (Cikarang Jababeka–Cawang Sentral) commenced operations. It connects Jakarta with two regions within Bekasi Regency: the Kota Jababeka industrial estate in Cikarang and Grand Wisata Bekasi housing estate in Tambun Selatan (South Tambun).

==== Soekarno–Hatta Airport feeder ====
On July 5, 2023, Transjakarta began the free public trial run for its first feeder service to the Soekarno–Hatta International Airport with the first route serving from the Kalideres bus terminal, labeled SH1. On May 1, 2024, the service became full opeational with the implementation of a regular fare (IDR3,500) and full time operational hours (05:00–22:00). As of June 17, the operational hours was extended to 24:00. It serves the mobility of Soekarno Hatta Airport's employees which up to 40,000–50,000. The maximum time travel for the first route from Kalideres to the airport is 45 minutes, as well as its opposite direction. It does not pass toll roads, but instead passing regular roads. Route SH1 terminates at the airport's office complex and also at the skytrain station, but do not stop at all three passenger terminals.

A Metrotrans bus serving route SH2 from Blok M to Soetta Airport. Note the aeroplane livery and brand name "Transbandara"

On March 12, 2026, route SH2 from Blok M was launched, operating with 14 units of Metrotrans low floor buses fitted with suitcase luggage for public passengers. Like route SH1, it terminates at the airport office complex. However, route SH2 does not stop at all three passenger terminals like the first one, but an airport skytrain and a free shuttle bus service are provided to funnel Transjakarta passengers to the terminals. For the first three months of operation, the tariff for route SH2 was IDR 3,500. Since September 1, 2026, the tariff has been increased to IDR 15,000 and the route itself has been since branded as Transbandara ('Airport Shuttle').

The Soetta Airport feeder service was initially launched as a standalone service type, before it merged and included in the Transjabodetabek catalogue.

=== Royaltrans feeder ===
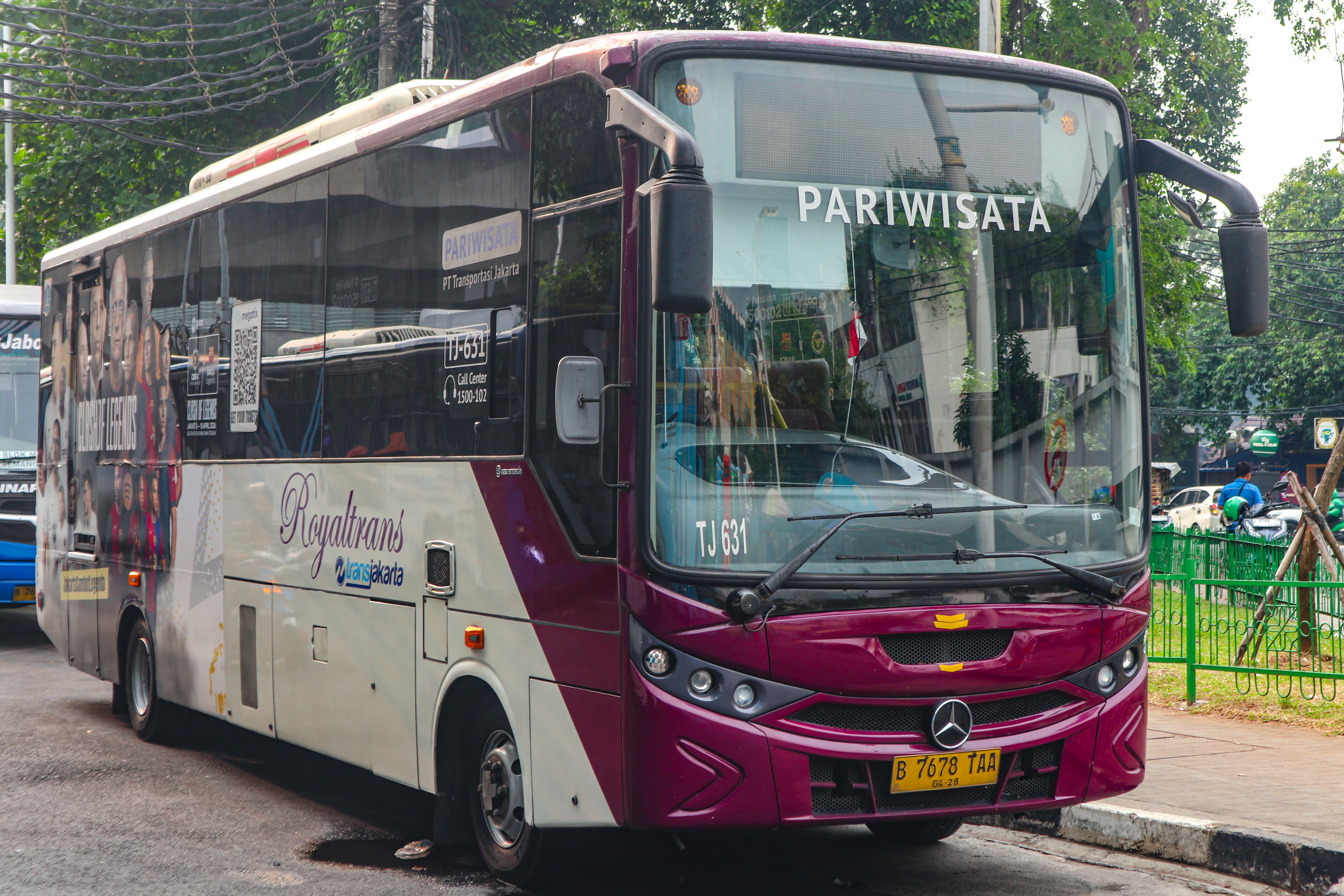
The Mercedes–Benz OF917 bus fleet of Royaltrans

Transjakarta's premium service, Royaltrans, began operation on March 12, 2018. It is operated with Mercedes-Benz OF917 buses with special fittings, including coach-style reclinenable seats with USB charging ports, personal adjustable air-conditioner vents and luggage. Like the regular cross-border (Transjabodetabek) feeder, this service also covers commuter areas in the neighboring satellite cities (with high-end residential areas being the main target), and is related with the odd-even policy in the Jakarta–Cikampek Toll Road. Royaltrans is the only Transjakarta's service that's not subsidized by Jakarta Municipal Government.

Just like the regular Transjabodetabek feeder, Royaltrans routes have the same designated prefix codes based on the destination of each routes (except three to Cibubur). As it is not subsidized by the Jakarta Government, the fare for most routes are IDR 20,000 (US$1.27); only S14 is charged at IDR 35,000 (US$2.23).

The routes are:

- Route Cibubur – Blok M
- Route Cibubur – Balai Kota
- Route Cibubur – Kuningan
- Route Summarecon Bekasi – Blok M
- Route Summarecon Bekasi – Setiabudi Utara (Kuningan)
- Route Cinere – Kuningan
- Route CInere – Bundaran Senayan
- Route Bumi Serpong Damai (BSD) – Fatmawati
- Route Summarecon Serpong – Lebak Bulus
- Route Bintaro – Fatmawati

All routes only operate on weekdays (Monday–Friday) and are closed on public holidays. Each route has different operational time schedule. All Royaltrans routes are classified as non-BRT routes fully disintegrated from BRT system and only stop at pedestrian bus stops.

=== Rental apartment feeder ===
The service is for low-class income people of Rental Apartment (Rumah Susun Sederhana Sewa, Rusunawa). With the ID Card for adult or KJP (Kartu Jakarta Pintar) for student, the service is free, but not for the accompanying person. The first route from Tanjung Priok to Rusunawa Marunda (10A) operated from January 17, 2016 until September 26, 2026, followed by the other 9 feeders that connects Rusunawa Daan Mogot, Rusunawa Tambora, Rusunawa Kapuk Muara, Rusunawa Flamboyan, Rusunawa Cipinang Besar Selatan, Rusunawa Buddha Tzu Chi, Rusunawa Pulogebang, Rusunawa Pinus Elok, and Rusunawa Rawa Bebek. All rental apartment feeder routes are classified as non-BRT routes, but some are partially integrated into BRT system while others are fully disintegrated from.

The routes that are partially integrated with the BRT system are:

- Route Kapuk Muara Rental Apartment – Tambora Rental Apartment
- Route Rawa Bebek Rental Apartment – Bukit Duri
- Route Waduk Pluit Rental Apartment – Penjaringan Rental Apartment

The routes that are fully disintegrated from the BRT system are:

- Route West Cakung Rental Apartment (Albo) – Pulo Gadung
- Route Jati Rawasari Rental Apartment – Senen
- Route Pesakih Rental Apartment – Kalideres
- Route Flamboyan Rental Apartment – Cengkareng
- Route Cipinang Besar Selatan Rental Apartment – Penas Kalimalang
- Route Rawa Bebek Rental Apartment – Penggilingan
- Route Pulo Gebang Rental Apartment – Penggilingan
- Route Cakung KM 2 Rental Apartment – Penggilingan
- Route Marunda Rental Apartment – Waduk Pluit Rental Apartment

== Special routes ==
Special routes (rute khusus) are operating on special occasions only. Some of them are classified as cross-corridor BRT routes serving exclusively BRT stations, but some also operates as a non-BRT feeder service.

=== Ancol car-free day shuttle ===
On August 9, 2026, Transjakarta launched a specialized shuttle route coded 51ST ('ST' is an abbreviation of 'shuttle'), connecting Bundaran Senayan BRT station with Ancol Dreamland that only operates during Ancol Car-free Day from 06:00 to 10:00. It follows Corridor 1 from Bundaran Senayan to Monas, then turn right at Harmoni intersection stopping at Pecenongan and Juanda stations, tracing Corridor 5 from Pasar Baru Timur to Pademangan station, turning right to R.E. Martadinata street, and enter Ancol Dreamland via its eastern gate. Passengers of this route are allowed to enter Ancol Dreamland free of charge.

- Route Bundaran Senayan – Bundaran Symphony of the Sea (Ancol)

=== Direct access to the Port of Tanjung Priok ===
Transjakarta operates one special route from the Tanjung Priok BRT station of Corridor 10 as a direct access to the Port of Tanjung Priok and is only operational during mudik ('homecoming') seasons during Eid al-Fitr and/or Christmas holidays, namely route 10C. Unlike other routes, the operational schedule of this service is synchronized with the departure and arrivals of ships harboring at the Tanjung Priok Seaport.

- Route Tanjung Priok – Port of Tanjung Priok (inactive)

The service is currently inactive, recently operating from March 13–29, 2026.

=== Routes to tourist attractions for holiday seasons ===
During holiday seasons, such as Eid al-Fitr and Christmas, Transjakarta provide three seasonal BRT routes to Jakarta's two popular recreational places: two for Ragunan Zoo and one for Ancol Dreamland. All operations were temporarily ceased between 2020 and 2022, most likely due to the COVID-19 pandemic. One of the three routes, namely Route 13D, once operated every regular weekend until February 3, 2024.

The special routes are:

- Route Pulo Gadung – Ragunan (inactive)
- Route Pecenongan – Ancol (inactive)
- Route Puri Beta 2 – Ragunan (inactive)

All routes are currently inactive. Route 5H went operational from March 31 – April 7, 2025; the rest were conducted from April 11–15, 2024.

=== Jakarta Fair feeder ===
On May 29, 2015, Transjakarta launched a single special route from Monas BRT station to the annual Jakarta Fair (Indonesian: Pekan Raya Jakarta (PRJ)) held at the Jakarta International Expo (JIEXPO). The aim is to serve passengers going to and from the Jakarta Fair, which would increase during the event. A designated BRT station was prepared outside the venue's east entrance. The route is made exclusively to operate during the Jakarta Fair and/or other events at the JIEXPO only. On June 7, 2017, Transjakarta added more routes serving the Jakarta Fair to accommodate passengers from other directions such as Kampung Melayu, Cililitan and Pulo Gadung. As of 2026, the routes are:

- Route Balai Kota – JIExpo Kemayoran
- Route Kampung Melayu – JIExpo Kemayoran
- Route Pulo Gadung – JIExpo Kemayoran

All routes only operate during the Jakarta Fair and/or other events on JIExpo. They are all currently inactive, recently served the Jakarta Fair from June 11 – July 12, 2026. JIExpo Kemayoran complex is prepared as a BRT station dedicated as a terminus for these routes.

== Mikrotrans feeder routes ==
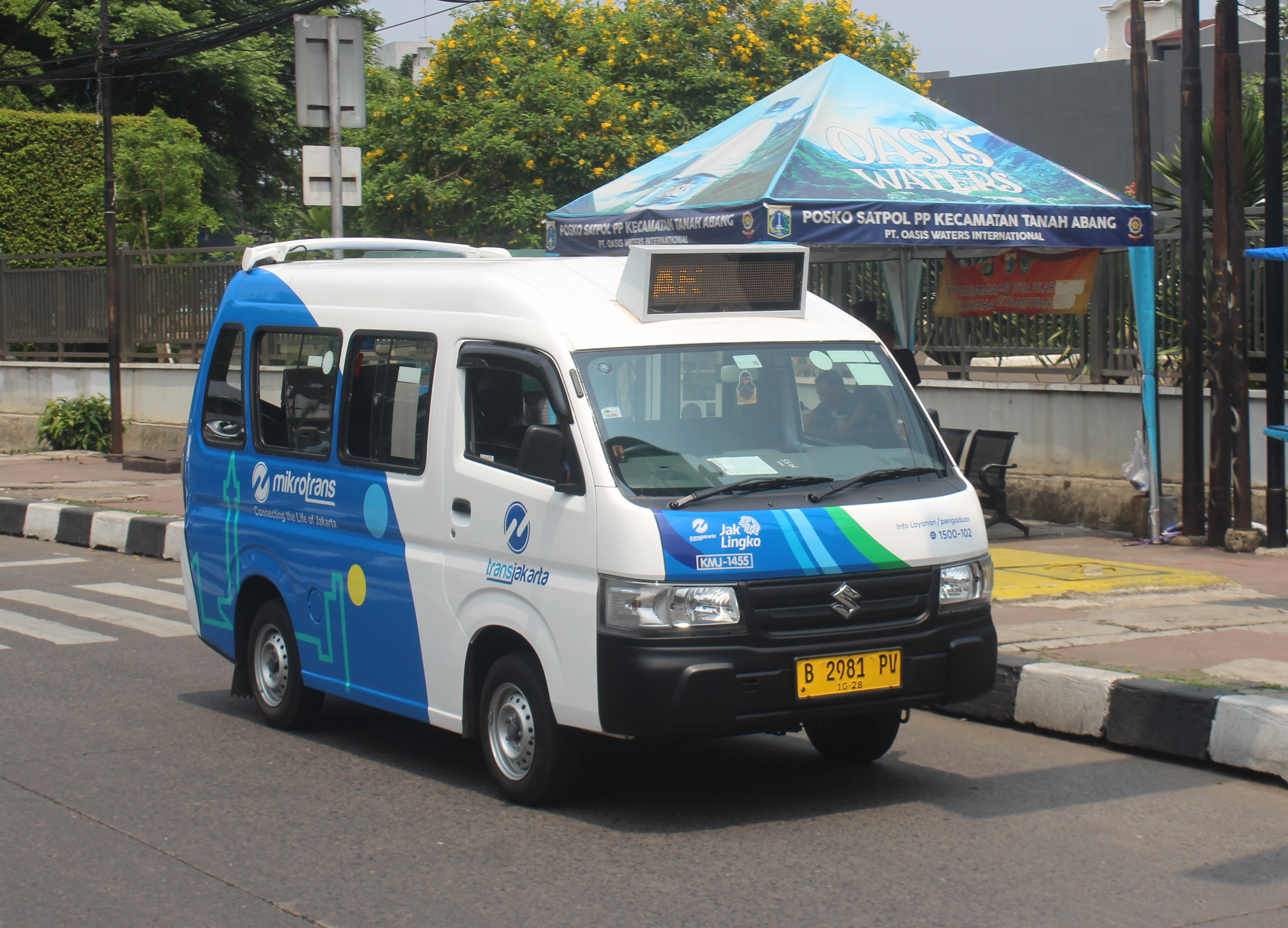
A Suzuki Carry fleet of microbus that serves JAK-54 route (Grogol – Benhil).

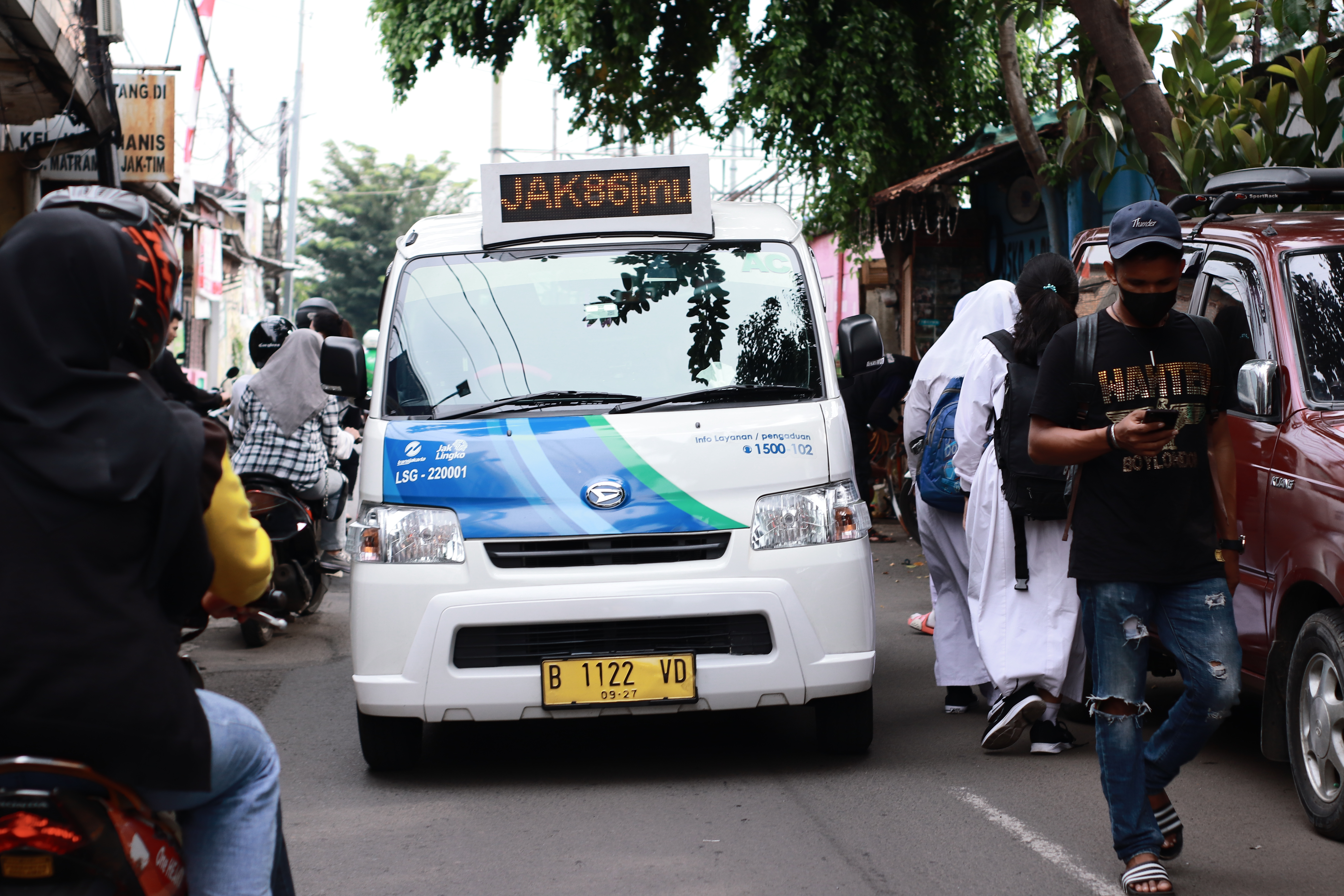
The air-conditioned Daihatsu Gran Max fleet of Mikrotrans that serves JAK-86 route (Rawamangun – Manggarai).

Mikrotrans (formerly OK OTrip or Angkot OK OTrip) is a free-of-charge share taxi (angkot) feeder service that have been integrated and operating within the Transjakarta ecosystem, connecting city centers and residential suburbs within Jakarta, using microbus fleets for angkot (angkutan kota, city transport) or mikrolet transport modes. It is made as a part of the Jak Lingko integration program, aimed to integrate all public transportation modes in Jakarta, including the angkot operators such as Koperasi Wahana Kalpika (KWK) and Trans Halim. Mikrotrans is erroneously referred as Jak Lingko or Angkot Jak Lingko. Although the service is free of charge, passengers are still required to tap their electronic money cards on a smartcard reader on all Mikrotrans units.

Mikrotrans utilize microbus fleets like Suzuki Carry and Daihatsu Gran Max from the partnered angkot/mikrolet operators. Like its traditional counterpart, Mikrotrans fleets mostly do not have an air conditioning (AC) system, though some routes utilize units that include AC and automatic doors. Mikrotrans has distinctive livery to the traditional angkot/mikrolet and all units are currently buckled with CCTV cameras. The front passenger seat is reserved for priority passengers (disabled, pregnant women, elderlies, etc.).

On May 31, 2024, a 24-hour operations was introduced for 4 Mikrotrans routes (marked with ^{(24)}).

Currently, Transjakarta and Jak Lingko serves numerous active Mikrotrans routes with the JAK prefix code, which are mostly based on angkot and mikrolet routes:

- JAK 001 Tanjung Priok – Plumpang
- JAK 002 Kampung Melayu – Duren Sawit
- JAK 003 Lebak Bulus – Andara
- JAK 004 Grogol – Tubagus Angke
- JAK 005 Semper – Rorotan
- JAK 006 Kampung Rambutan – Pondok Gede
- JAK 007 Tawakal – Tanah Abang
- JAK 008 Roxy – Bendungan Hilir
- JAK 009 Rox Mas – Karet
- JAK 010 Tanah Abang – Kota
- JAK 010A Gondangdia Station – Cikini via Salemba Raya
- JAK 010B Gondangdia Station - Cikini via Kramat Raya
- JAK 011 Tanah Abang – Kebayoran Lama
- JAK 012 Tanah Abang – Kebayoran Lama via Pos Pengumben
- JAK 013 Tanah Abang – Kota via Jembatan Lima
- JAK 014 Tanah Abang – Meruya Ilir
- JAK 015 Tanjung Priok – Bulak Turi
- JAK 016 PGC – Condet
- JAK 017 Pulo Gadung – Senen
- JAK 018 Duren Kalibata Station – Kuningan
- JAK 019 Pinang Ranti – Setu
- JAK 020 Lubang Buaya – Cawang UKI
- JAK 021 PGC – Dwikora
- JAK 022 Penas Kalimalang – Dwikora
- JAK 023 Pisangan Baru – Senen
- JAK 024 Pulo Gadung – Senen via Kelapa Gading
- JAK 025 Kalisari – Pasar Rebo
- JAK 026 Duren Sawit – Rawamangun
- JAK 027 Rorotan – Pulogebang
- JAK 028 Pasar Rebo – Harjamukti LRT Station
- JAK 029 Tanjung Priok – Rusun Sukapura
- JAK 030 Citraland Grogol – Meruya
- JAK 031 Andara – Blok M
- JAK 032 Petukangan – Lebak Bulus
- JAK 033 Pulogadung – Kota
- JAK 034 Rawamangun – Klender
- JAK 035 Rawamangun – Pangkal Jati
- JAK 036 Cilangkap – Cililitan^{(24)}
- JAK 037 Cililitan – Condet
- JAK 038 Bulak Ringin – Kampung Rambutan
- JAK 039 Duren Sawit – Kalimalang
- JAK 040 Grogol – Tubagus Angke
- JAK 041 Kampung Melayu – Pulogadung
- JAK 042 Kampung Melayu – Pondok Kelapa
- JAK 043B Tongtek Bukit Duri – Cililitan via Tebet Eco Park
- JAK 043C Sarana Jaya – Tebet Eco Park – Cawang Station
- JAK 044 Andara – Lenteng Agung
- JAK 045 Ragunan – Lebak Bulus
- JAK 046 Pasar Minggu – Jagakarsa
- JAK 047 Pasar Minggu Terminal – Ciganjur^{(24)}
- JAK 048A Tebet Station – Karet
- JAK 048B Tebet Station – Kampung Melayu
- JAK 049A Cipulir – Kampung Baru
- JAK 049B Lebak Bulus – Cipulir
- JAK 050 Kalideres – Puri Kembangan
- JAK 051 Taman Kota – Budi Luhur
- JAK 052 Kalideres – Muara Angke^{(24)}
- JAK 053 Grogol – Pos Pengumben
- JAK 054 Grogol – Benhil
- JAK 056 Grogol – Srengseng
- JAK 058 Cilincing – Rusun Padat Karya
- JAK 059 Rawamangun – Rawa Sengon
- JAK 060 Kelapa Gading – Rusun Kemayoran
- JAK 061 Pulomas – Cempaka Putih
- JAK 064 Lenteng Agung – Aselih
- JAK 071 Pinang Ranti – Kampung Rambutan via Kampung Dukuh
- JAK 072 Kampung Rambutan – Pasar Rebo
- JAK 073 Harjamukti LRT Station – Pasar Rebo
- JAK 074 Rawamangun – Cipinang Muara
- JAK 075 Kampung Pulo – Halim^{(24)}
- JAK 076 Jalan Industri Raya – ASMI
- JAK 077 Tanjung Priok – Jembatan Hitam
- JAK 078A Benda – Cengkareng Timur
- JAK 078B Jembatan Tiga – Teluk Gong
- JAK 079 Cengkareng – Tubagus Angke
- JAK 080 Rawa Buaya – Rawa Kompeni
- JAK 084 Kampung Melayu – Kapin Raya
- JAK 085 Bintara – Cipinang Indah
- JAK 086 Rawamangun – Manggarai
- JAK 088 Tanjung Priok – Ancol Barat
- JAK 089 Tanjung Priok – Taman Kota Intan
- JAK 090 Tanjung Priok – Rusun Kemayoran
- JAK 093 Jeruk Purut – Kebayoran Lama
- JAK 095 Lebak Bulus – Pasar Minggu
- JAK 098 Kampung Rambutan – Munjul
- JAK 099 Pulo Gadung – Lampiri
- JAK 100 Pulo Gebang – Rusun Pinus Elok
- JAK 102 Blok M – Lebak Bulus
- JAK 105 Stasiun Tebet – Rusun Cipinang Muara
- JAK 106 Klender – Kampung Melayu
- JAK 107 Jembatan Garden – Puri Beta
- JAK 108 Kramat Jati – Bambu Apus
- JAK 110A Rusun Marunda – Pulo Gebang
- JAK 110B Rusun Komarudin – Putaran Balik Babek TNI
- JAK 112 Pulogadung – Tanah Merah
- JAK 113 Sindang Koja – Kampung Sawah
- JAK 115 Tanjung Priok – Pegangsaan Dua IGI
- JAK 117 Terminal Tanjung Priok – Terminal Tanah Merdeka
- JAK 118 Taman Waduk Papanggo – Kota Tua
- JAK 120 Jakarta International Stadium – Muara Angke

== Double-decker tour bus routes ==
This service is currently divided into two types. The first one is free-of-charge called #jakartaexplorer or simply Transjakarta Tour Bus (Bus Wisata Transjakarta), though passengers are still required to tap their electronic money cards on smartcard readers, and stops on regular bus stops. The second is a paid premium service named Open Top Tour of Jakarta, running on different operational schedule and ticketing system, and provides exclusive lounges.

=== Free double-decker tour services ===
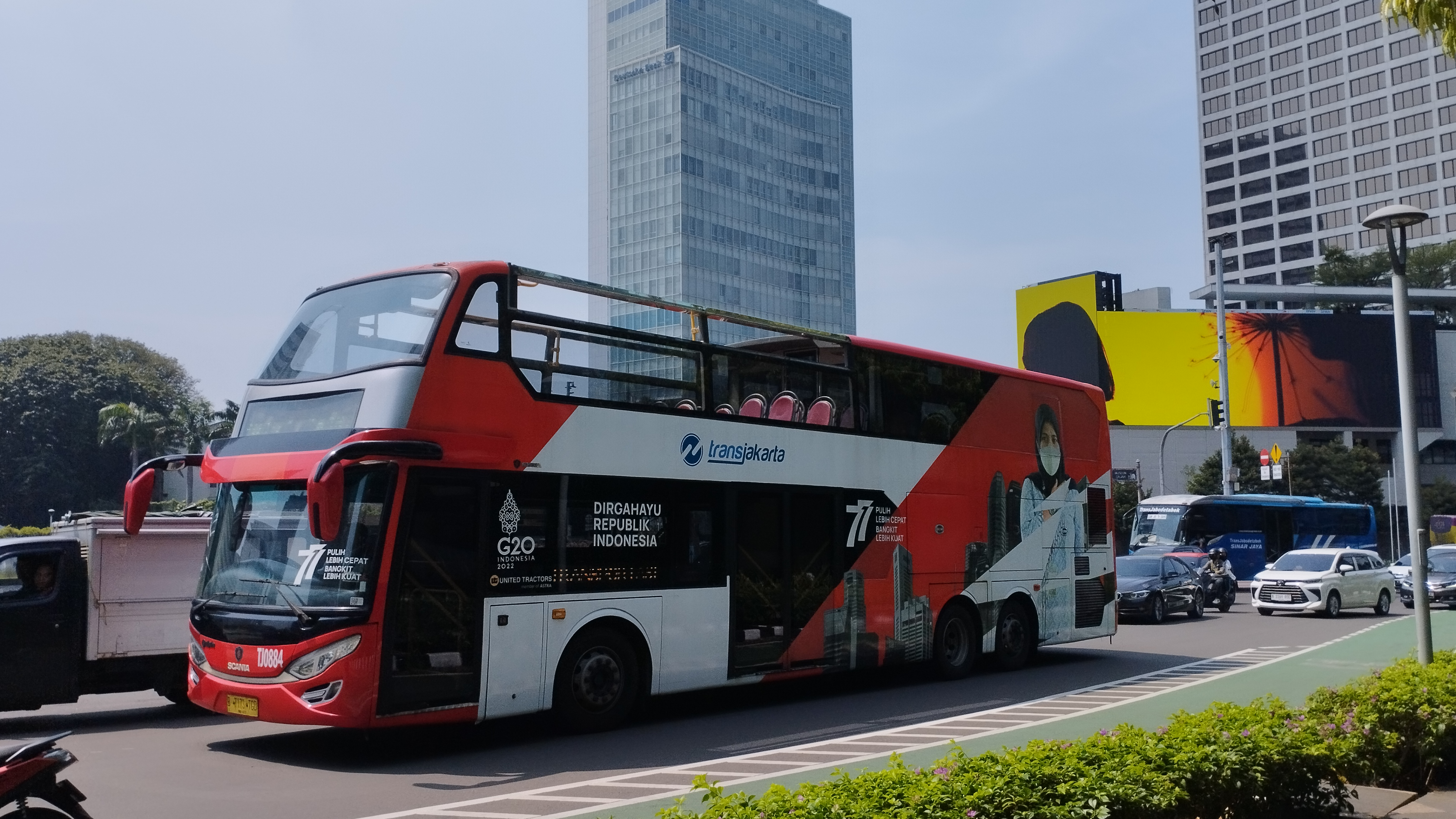
The Scania K310UB double-decker (coded TJ-884) at the Hotel Indonesia roundabout, featuring an open deck

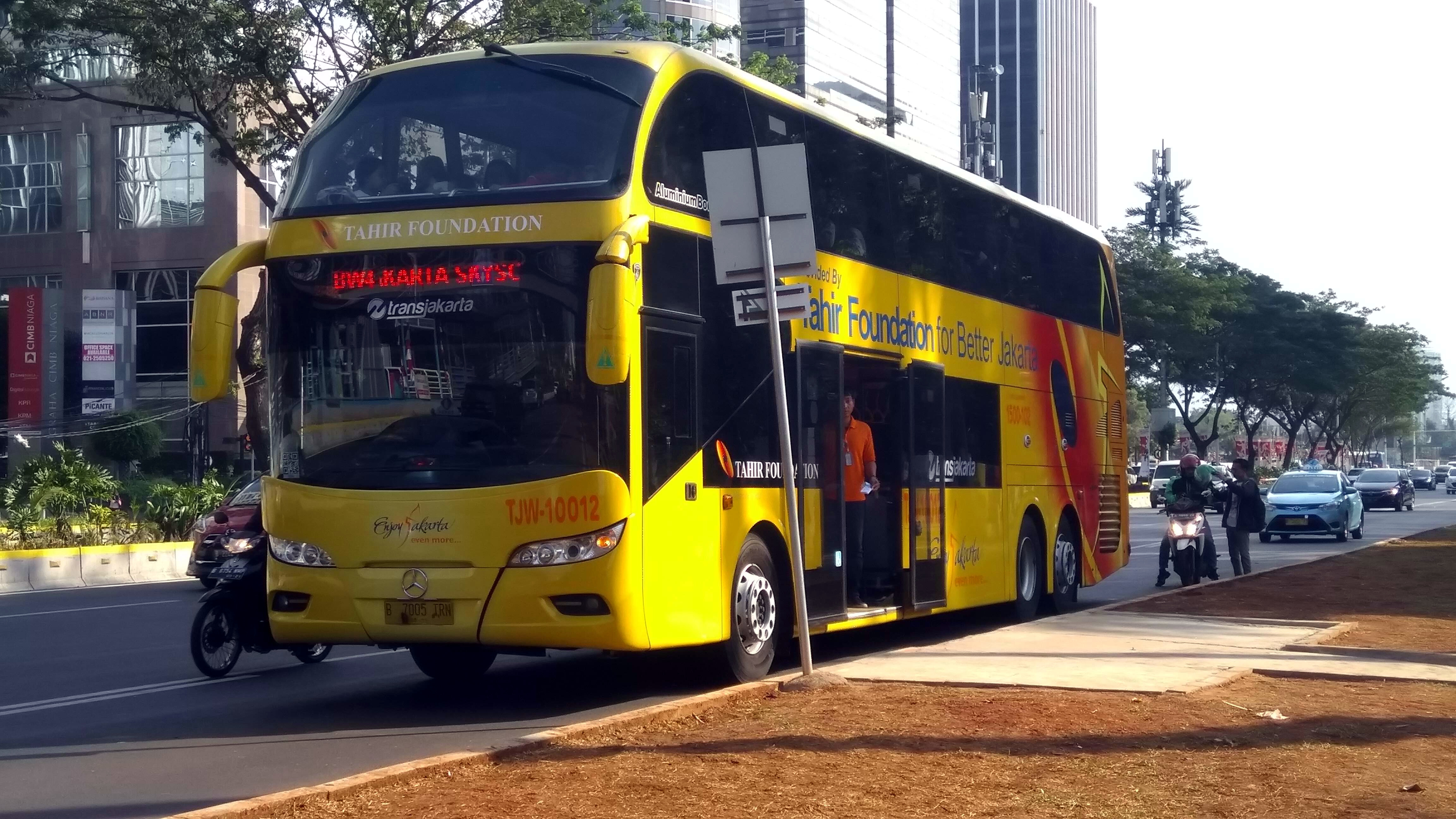
TJW-10012, a Double Decker bus CSR by Tahir Foundation

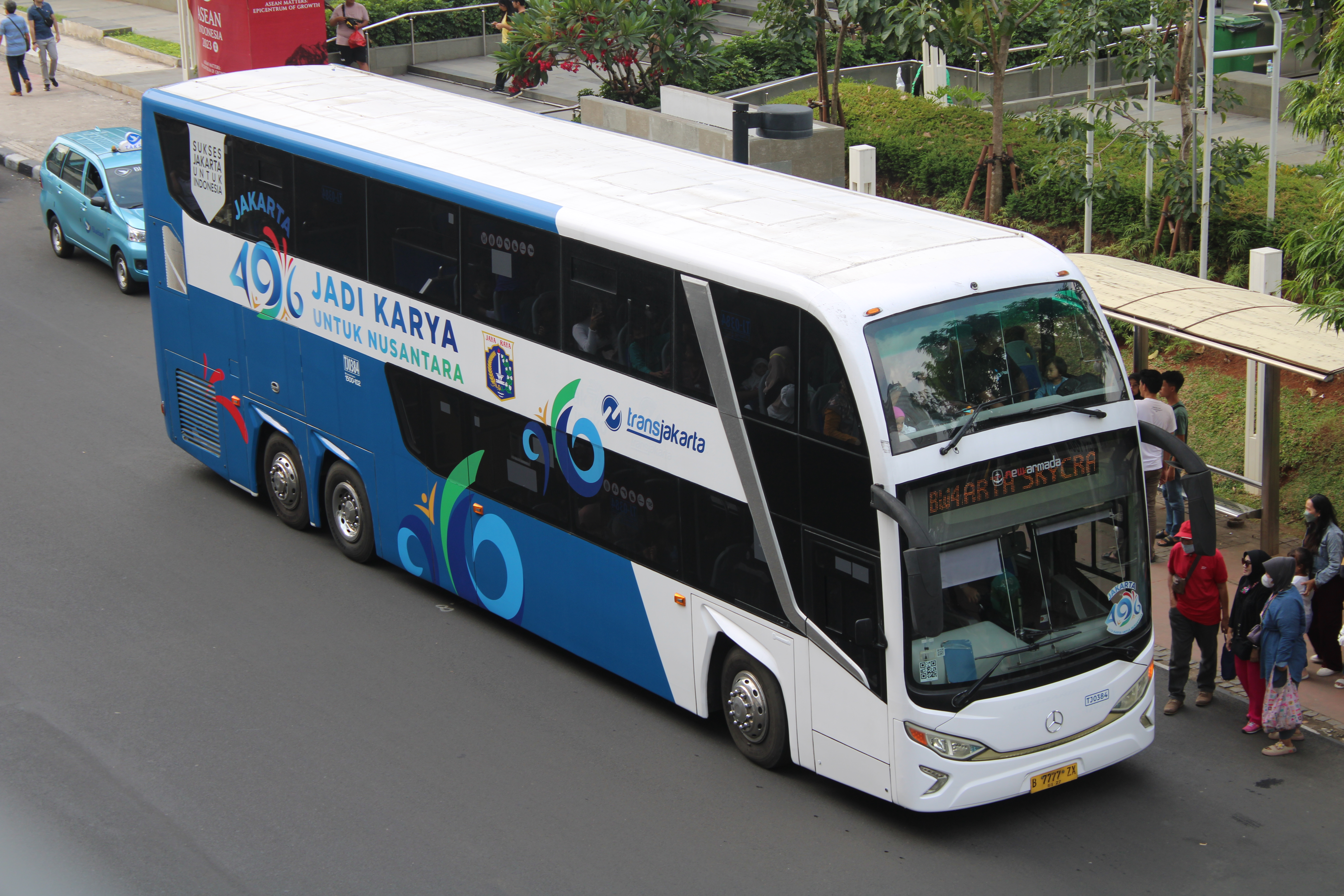
The Mercedes-Benz OC500 RF double-decker bus (coded TJ-384) from CSR fund by Artha Graha

The free double-decker tour bus service was originally owned by the Jakarta Tourism and Culture Office (Dinas Pariwisata dan Kebudayaan Provinsi DKI Jakarta), launched in February 2014 as City Tour Jakarta. It originally had one route only, connecting the Hotel Indonesia roundabout (Bundaran HI) with Pasar Baru, with 5 double-decker bus units. The service was also known as 'Mpok Siti' ('Madam Siti' in Betawi language) as all the drivers were women. About a year later, the service was acquired by Transjakarta.

Currently, the double-decker tour bus service is simply known as Transjakarta Tour Bus or #jakartaexplorer and has 4 routes coded with "BW" prefix. Newer bus fleets were sourced from the government touting corporate social responsibility (CSR) from:

- Jakarta Government (5 units)
- PT. Coca-Cola Indonesia (1 unit)
- Tahir Foundation (5 units)
- PT. Sumber Alfaria Trijaya (1 unit)
- Tower Bersama Group (1 unit)
- CIMB Niaga (3 units)
- Dulux/Akzo Nobel (2 units)
- Artha Graha (4 units)
- Agung Sedayu Group (4 units)
- PT. Nestlé Indonesia (1 unit)

All CSR's liveries have been removed and replaced by various illustrations and artworks made by graphic designers. Some fleets have been modified to feature an open deck.

With a fleet totaling 27 buses, the routes serviced are:

- History of Jakarta (Juanda Istiqlal – Museum Bank Indonesia – Kali Besar Barat 1 – Juanda Istiqlal)
- Monas Explorer (IRTI – Balai Kota 1 – Perpustakaan Nasional – DPRD DKI Jakarta – Tugu Tani 2 – Gambir 2 – Juanda Istiqlal – Monas 1 – Monas 2 – Monas 3 – IRTI)
- Jakarta Skyscrapers (IRTI – Balai Kota 1 – M.H. Thamrin 1 – Wisma Nusantara – Tosari 1 – Dukuh Atas 3 – Karet Sudirman 1 – Gelora Bung Karno 1 – Bundaran Senayan 3 – FX Sudirman – GBK Pintu 7 – Tosari 2 – Plaza Indonesia – M.H. Thamrin 2 – Museum Nasional – Pecenongan 1 – Pasar Baru Gedung Kesenian Jakarta – Monas 1 – Monas 3 – IRTI)

All routes operate everyday from 10:00 to 17:00.

=== Open Top Tour of Jakarta ===
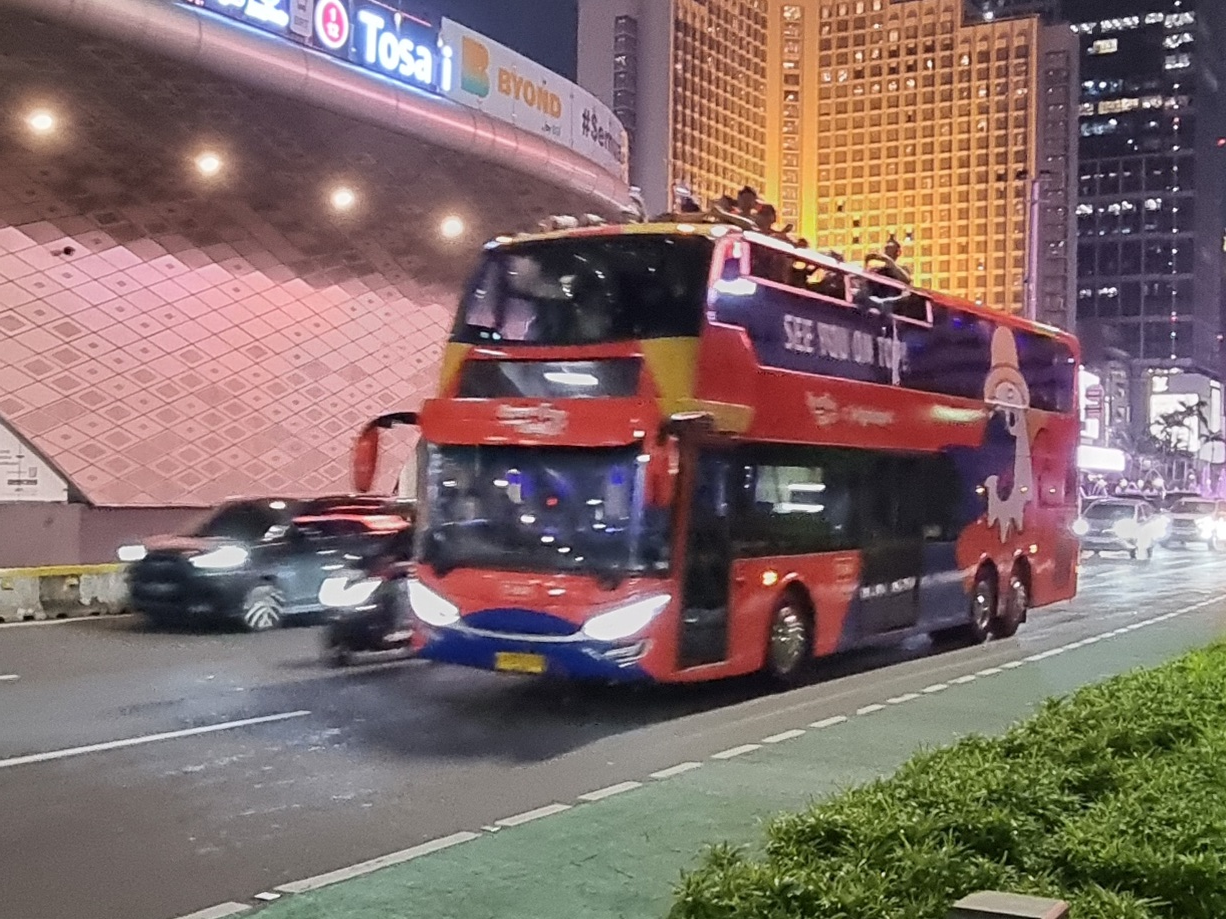
One of the fleets of Open Top Tour of Jakarta nearby the Tosari BRT station, serving the Jakarta Skylines route

Open Top Tour of Jakarta is a specialized paid/premium version of the free service counterpart launched on December 20, 2024, in collaboration with Brightspot Market, an annual food, art, fashion and lifestyle festival. Unlike the regular ones which are free of charge, Open Top Tour of Jakarta is charged at IDR 100,000 (roughly US$6.18) with prebooked tickets via online, operates in different operational times, does not stop at regular bus stops to board and alight passengers, and provides exclusive waiting lounges on terminus point and wireless headphones while on board. It operates with two schedules: Sunset Tour (16:00 – 17:00) and Night Tour (18:30, 19:30 and 20:30).

Open Top Tour of Jakarta currently operates with four routes:

- Jakarta Skylines, running from Ratu Plaza to Bundaran HI, parallel with the regular BW4 (Jakarta Skyscrapers) double-decker bus route.
- Jakarta Heritage, a partial circular route passing some notable landmarks near Pasar Baru, such as Istiqlal Mosque and the Jakarta Cathedral, Lapangan Banteng, Tugu Tani, and the National Monument (Monas). It basically mimics the BW2 (Monas Explorer) double-decker bus route, but operates in an opposite direction.
- Jakarta Batavia, running from Sarinah to Kota Tua Jakarta. It follows the BW1 (History of Jakarta) route from Harmoni all the way to Kota Tua, but southbound buses continue to go through M.H. Thamrin street and make a detour at Bundaran HI instead of terminating near Juanda railway station.
- Jakarta Seaside, running within the Pantai Indah Kapuk coastal township, passing the township's notable landmarks and tourist attractions such as PIK Icon, Pantjoran Chinatown, Al-Ikhlas Mosque, Aloha Pasir Putih, Nusantara International Convention Exhibition and Taman Doa Our Lady of Akita

== Inactive routes ==
=== Inactive BRT routes ===
==== Regular ====
- Route Kalideres - ASMI (CLOSED)
- Route 4M Pulo Gadung – Kota (CLOSED)
- Route Cililitan – Ancol (CLOSED)
- Route Penas Kalimalang – Matraman (CLOSED)
- Route 5K Kampung Melayu – Kota (CLOSED)
- Route 7M Kampung Rambutan – Pulo Gadung via Pemuda (CLOSED)
- Route Pinang Ranti – Kota (only on weekdays) (CLOSED)
- Route 9K Kampung Rambutan – Grogol (via Jagorawi Toll Road and Jakarta Inner Ring Road) (only on weekdays) (CLOSED)
- Route 9M Pancoran Barat – Latuharhari (CLOSED)
- Route Tanjung Priok – Kampung Rambutan (CLOSED)
- Route 11V Pulo Gebang – Pasar Baru (CLOSED)
- Route 12M Sunter Boulevard Barat – Harmoni (CLOSED)
- Route 13A Puri Beta 2 – Blok M (CLOSED)
- Route Puri Beta 2 – Dukuh Atas (CLOSED)
- Route Puri Beta 2 – Kampung Melayu (CLOSED)

==== Express ====
In late October 2017, Transjakarta launched 6 alternative cross–corridor and express routes to alleviate the additional traffic caused by infrastructure projects preparing for the 2018 Asian Games in Jakarta and Palembang. The routes were:

- Route L4 PGC 2 – Dukuh Atas 2 (CLOSED)
- Route L6B Ragunan – Monas via Corridor 13 (CLOSED)
- Route L7 Kampung Melayu – Kampung Rambutan via TMII Toll Road (CLOSED)
- Route L10 PGC 2 – Tanjung Priok via Toll Road (CLOSED)

Note: L2 has since been withdrawn since the travel time was not as expected, L7 has been merge to 7 as an alternative route during morning and evening rush hour (via HEK toll road), L6B was shorten to Senayan and become 6V
L10A and L10B was merged into L10 with 2 directions

=== Inactive non–BRT feeder routes ===
Including inner city, cross–border (Transjabodetabek), Royaltrans, rental apartement, and train station feeder routes.

- Route R1A Pantai Indah Kapuk – Kota Tua (CLOSED)
- Route 1D Karang Anyar Rental Apartment – Olimo (CLOSED)
- Route Tanah Abang – Blok M (CLOSED)
- Route 1U TMII – Balai Kota (CLOSED)
- Route 1V Lebak Bulus – Bundaran HI (CLOSED)
- Route Rawa Bebek Rental Apartment – Kodamar (CLOSED)
- Route 2K Jakarta Garden City (JGC) – Harapan Indah (CLOSED)
- Route 4A TU Gas – Jelambar, previously PPD P.210 (CLOSED)
- Route 4E Jatinegara Kaum Rental Apartment – Pulogadung (CLOSED)
- Route 5A Kampung Melayu – Grogol, previously PPD P.213 (CLOSED)
- Route 6E Tebet Station – Karet via Rasuna Said (CLOSED)
- Route 6F Manggarai Station – Ragunan (CLOSED)
- Route 6R Ragunan – Lebak Bulus – Ragunan (CLOSED)
- Route 7N Kampung Rambutan – Pasar Rebo – Gandaria (CLOSED)
- Route 8F Pasar Kebayoran Lama – BNI City Station (CLOSED)
- Route Tambora Rental Apartment – Pluit (CLOSED)
- Route Marunda Rental Apartment – Tanjung Priok
- Route 10F Pegangsaan Dua LRT Station – Sunter Kelapa Gading (CLOSED)
- Route 11A Pulo Gebang – Rawamangun (CLOSED)
- Route 11K Komarudin Rental Apartment – Penggilingan (CLOSED)
- Route 11N Cipinang Muara Rental Apartment – Jatinegara (CLOSED)
- Route 11R Cakung Km2 Rental Apartment – Bukit Duri (CLOSED)
- Route 11P Pondok Bambu Rental Apartment – Radin Inten (CLOSED)
- Route 11T Cakung Station – Pulo Gebang via Jakarta Outer Ring Road (CLOSED)
- Route 11U Cakung Station – Pulo Gebang via Cakung Cilincing (CLOSED)
- Route 12D Sukapura Rental Apartment – Sunter (CLOSED)
- Route 12E History of Jakarta Explorer (CLOSED)
- Route Penjaringan Rental Apartment – Penjaringan (CLOSED)
- Route 12K Asemka Explorer (CLOSED)
- Harapan Indah – Pasar Baru (CLOSED)
- Poris Plawad – Kemayoran (CLOSED)
- Depok – Grogol (CLOSED)
- Route B12 Summarecon Bekasi – Tanjung Priok (CLOSED)
- Route B15 Jatibening – Blok M (CLOSED)
- Route B16 Jatibening – Kuningan (CLOSED)
- Route B22 Bekasi Timur – Juanda (CLOSED)
- Route B23 Bekasi Timur – Manggarai (Tebet) (CLOSED)
- Route B24 Bekasi Timur – Kalideres (CLOSED)
- Route B31 Pulo Gebang – Harapan Indah (CLOSED)
- Route Summarecon Serpong – Tomang (CLOSED)
- Route Taman Banjar Wijaya – Petamburan (CLOSED)
- Route DA1 Dukuh Atas TOD – Sam Ratulangi (CLOSED)
- Route DA2 Dukuh Atas TOD – Tanah Abang (CLOSED)
- Route DA3 Dukuh Atas TOD – Kuningan (CLOSED)
- Route DA4 Dukuh Atas TOD – Kota (CLOSED)

=== Free service routes ===
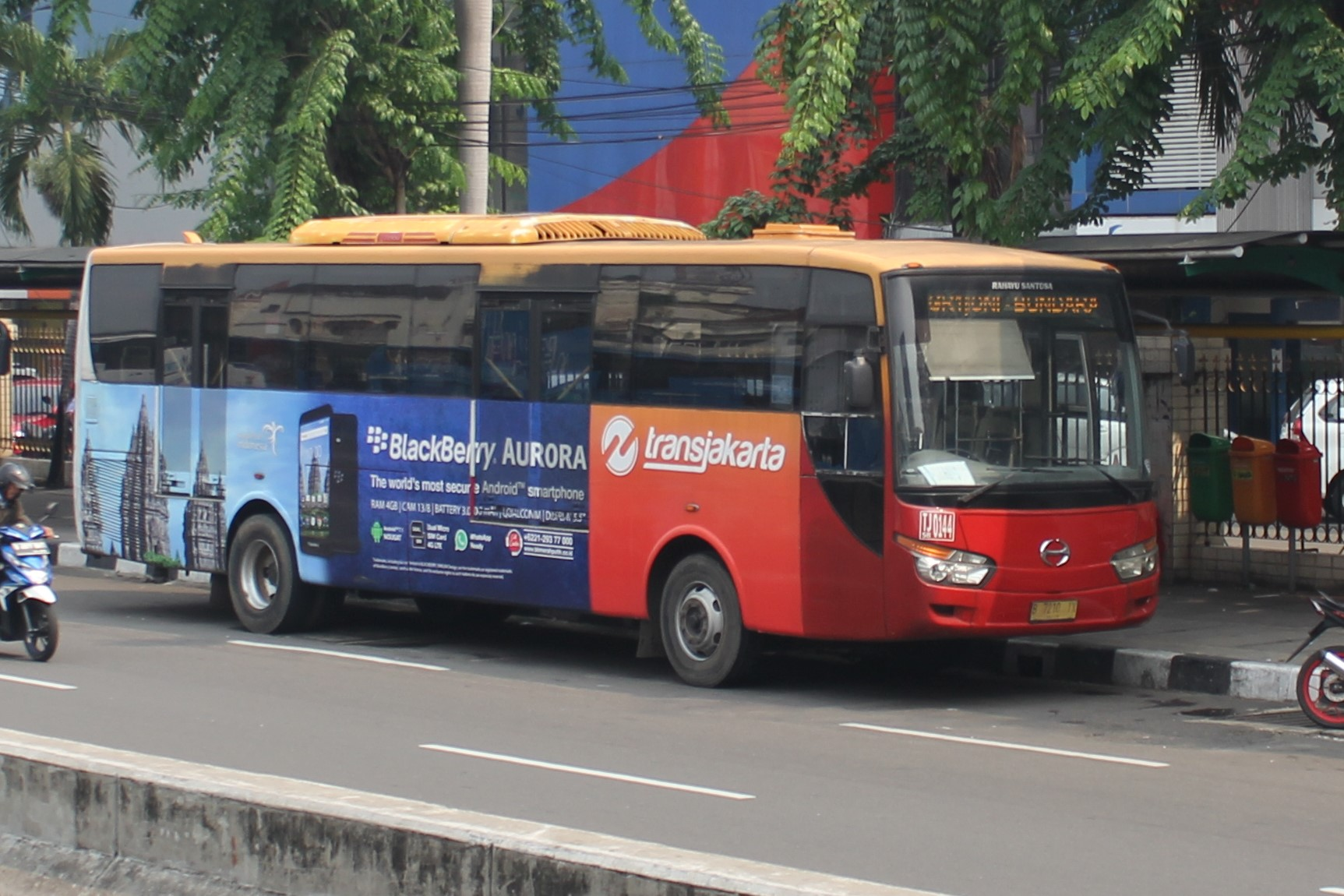
Prior to the introduction of Metrotrans low-floor buses in 2017, high-floor BRT buses were used to serve the original free service route

The original free service routes (rute layanan gratis) of Transjakarta operated as a shuttle service instead of feeder, and were coded GR (short for 'gratis,' Indonesian for 'free'). They did not operate within the dedicated lanes, instead going through the main roads and its opposite direction, thus considered as a disintegrated non-BRT service. In 2016, Transjakarta launched the first free service route (coded GR1) from Harmoni to Bundaran Senayan; the initial aim was to drop off and pick up workers that can't go through Thamrin and Sudirman roads as an impact of the odd-even rule. All the original free service routes have been closed, and has already replaced by Mikrotrans.

- GR1 Harmoni – Bundaran Senayan (CLOSED)
- GR2 Tanah Abang Explorer (CLOSED)
- GR3 Ragunan – Departemen Pertanian (CLOSED)
- GR4 Kota Intan – Museum Bahari (CLOSED)
- GR5 Kota Tua Explorer (CLOSED)

=== Inactive free double-decker tour bus routes ===
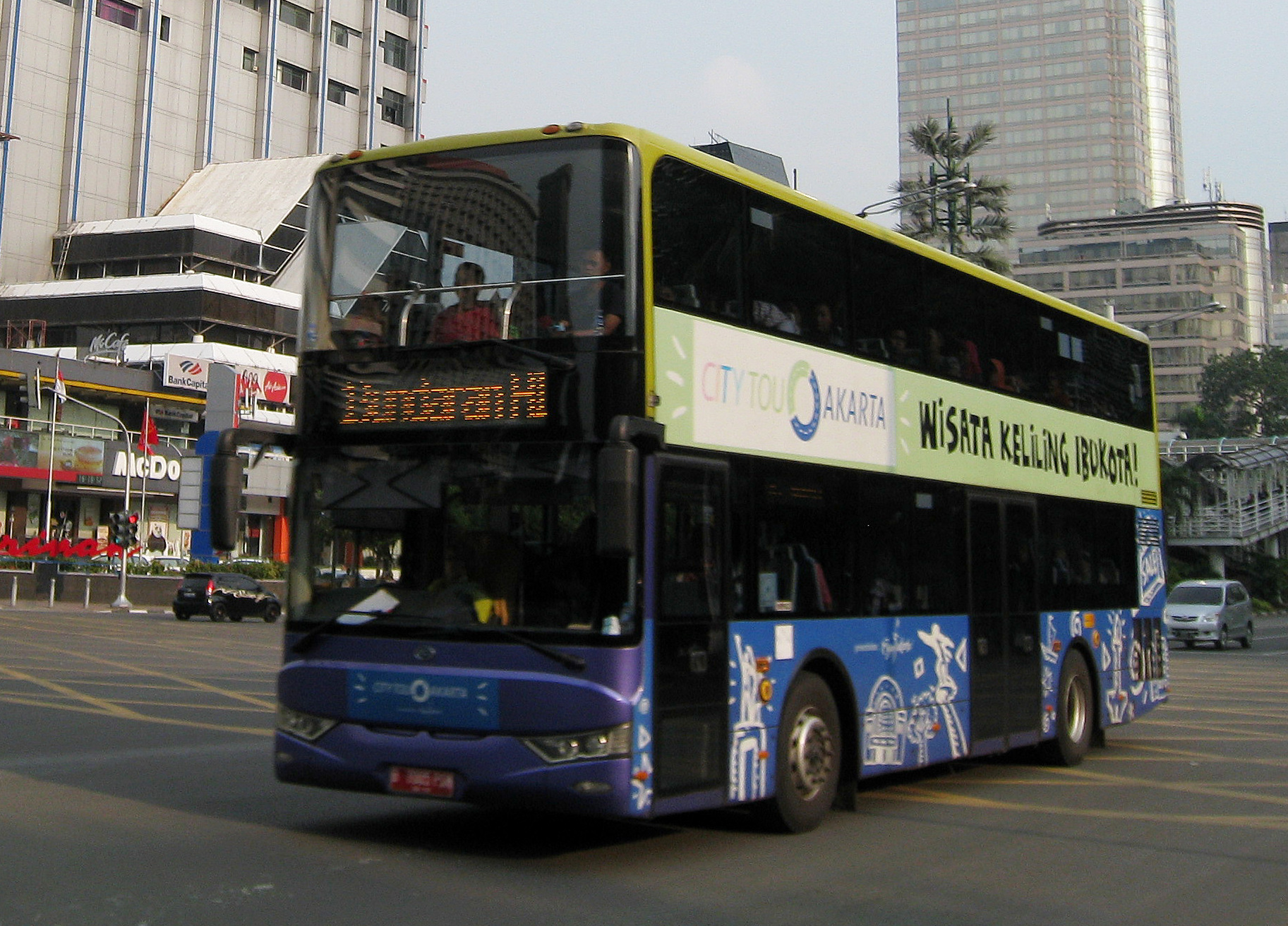
One of the five original double–decker tour buses that were bought by the Jakarta Tourism and Culture Office, prior to Transjakarta's acquisition in 2015. The photo was taken near Sarinah Building in 2016.

- BW3 – Art & Culinary (Balai Kota – Sarinah – Plaza Indonesia – Harmoni – Gedung Arsip Nasional – Museum Bank Indonesia – BNI 46 – Sawah Besar – SD Santa Maria – Juanda – Monas 2 – IRTI – Balai Kota) (CLOSED)
- BW5 – RPTRA Kalijodo (IRTI – Balai Kota – Sarinah – Tosari – RPTRA Kalijodo – Tosari – Plaza Indonesia – Sarinah – IRTI) (CLOSED)
- BW6 – Priok Cemetery (Juanda – Monas 1 – Monas 2 – Monas 3 – IRTI – Balai Kota – Sarinah – Tosari – Makam Mbah Priok – Tosari – Plaza Indonesia – Museum Nasional – Pasar Baru – Juanda) (CLOSED)
- BW7 – Jakarta Shopping (IRTI – Balai Kota – Sarinah – Tosari – Dukuh Atas 3 – Gelora Bung Karno North – Gelora Bung Karno 3 (Gate 1) – Plaza Indonesia – Senayan City – Gelora Bung Karno 2 – Dukuh Atas 4 – Tosari – Grand Indonesia – Sarinah – IRTI) (CLOSED)
- Kota Tua – Pantai Indah Kapuk (Kali Besar Barat 1 – Buddha Tzu Chi – Gold Coast – Food Street – PIK 2 Pantjoran – Melody Golf – Pantai Maju – Melody Golf 2 – Food Street – The Piano – Fresh Market PIK – PIK Avenue – Kali Besar Barat 1) (CLOSED)

=== Temporary shuttle routes ===
On April 15, 2022, Transjakarta began the first phase of BRT station revitalization program. To accommodate passengers who were affected by those revitalizations, Transjakarta operated numbers of temporary shuttle bus routes on corridors where one of their stations were temporarily closed for revitalization. On September 8 2025, Senen and Jaga Jakarta BRT stations was reopened after it was severely burn during the august 2025 protest, due to the skybridge between the stations was still under repair, Transjakarta operated 21ST temporary shuttle bus to accommodate passengers transferring between Senen and Jaga Jakarta BRT Station. All routes were coded with "ST" (abbreviation of "shuttle").

The first temporary shuttle route was 1ST (Semanggi – Monumen Nasional) to accommodate the revitalization process of BRT stations in Corridor 1. 1ST route began its operational on April 15 and ended on September 11, 2022, after the revitalized Gelora Bung Karno (now Senayan Bank Jakarta) BRT station was reopened on August 17. The second route was 2PJ (Pecenongan – Juanda, where PJ was the abbreviation of both Pecenongan and Juanda) to accommodate the revitalization of the Juanda BRT station. After the revitalized Juanda station completed and reopened on March 4, 2023, the shuttle route was extended to Bundaran HI and was renamed into 2ST to accommodate passengers who were affected by temporary route readjusment due to the Jakarta MRT phase 2A project. The 2ST route was closed on November 16, 2023.

Transjakarta operated 11 shuttle routes, with 21ST being the last one; which was closed on June 4, 2026, after the reopening of Senen Skybride. The routes were:

- 1ST Semanggi – Monumen Nasional (CLOSED)
- 2ST Juanda – Bundaran HI (CLOSED)
- 3ST Atrium – Budi Utomo (CLOSED)
- 4ST Pulo Gadung – Bermis (CLOSED)
- 5ST Manggarai – Tosari (CLOSED)
- 6ST SMK 57 – Pejaten (CLOSED)
- 7ST Bidara Cina – Matraman Baru (CLOSED)
- 8ST Senayan JCC – Slipi Kemanggisan (CLOSED)
- 9ST Indosiar – Latumeten (CLOSED, Reopen as of October 31st 2026, modified as Grogol Reformasi - Roxy, during the Grogol skybridge maintenance)
- 10ST Cawang Sutoyo – BNN (CLOSED)
- 21ST Senen Shuttle (Senen TOYOTA Rangga - Jaga Jakarta) (CLOSED)

=== MRT feeder ===
The MRT feeder network connects suburbs, places of interest and park and ride locations with Jakarta MRT stations, using Minitrans buses with 32 seats. The services operate with frequent 5 minute headways. The following is a list of routes as of January 2020:

- Route MR1 CSW – Pakubuwono (CLOSED)
- Route MR2 CSW – Kramat Pela (CLOSED)
- Route MR3 CSW – Wijaya (CLOSED)
- Route MR5 Blok A MRT Station – Radio Dalam (CLOSED)
- Route MR8 Blok A MRT Station – Antasari (CLOSED)
- Route MR9 Fatmawati MRT Station – South Quarter (CLOSED)

=== Kopaja AC ===
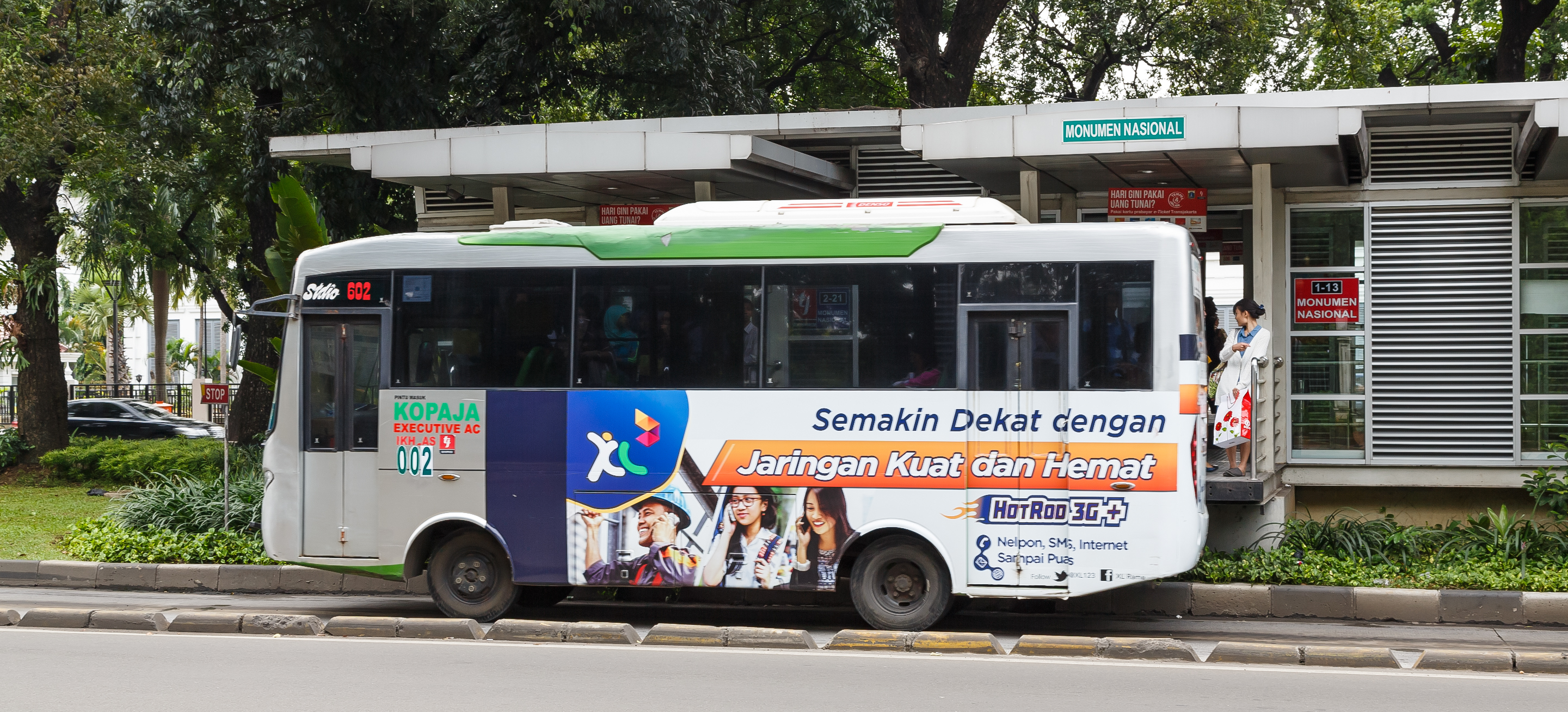
Kopaja AC S.602

The routes were:

- Kopaja P.20 (Lebak Bulus – Senen), now became Route 6H
- Kopaja S.13 (Ragunan Belakang – Grogol)
- Kopaja S.602 (Ragunan – National Monument), now became Route 6B
- Kopaja U.31 (Kelapa Gading – Kota)

=== APTB (Busway Integrated Cross-Border Transport) ===
On January 24, 2014, there are 143 APTB buses. But starting on June 1, 2016, APTBs are totally prohibited to enter busway corridors due to APTB frequently use non-busway corridors and still collect money from passengers whom enter APTB from Transjakarta buses stop. It is to follow March 5, 2016 policy that the policy is not so firm.

(APTB 01) Bekasi–Pulogadung Terminal Transjakarta Feeder
On March 28, 2012, Bekasi Transjakarta Feeder began serving from Bekasi Bus Station to Pulo Gadung Bus Station, and vice versa through Jakarta–Cikampek Toll Road. After temporarily halted operation since March 29, the feeder has hit the road again since April 21 with new route: Bekasi Terminal – Cut Meutia Street – Ahmad Yani Street – West Bekasi Toll Gate Bekasi – Jakarta Toll Road – Jakarta Inner Ring Toll Road – Perintis Kemerdekaan Street – Pulomas – Pulo Gadung Terminal

From September 17, 2012, APTB 01 integrates with two Transjakarta corridors. The stations are: Corridor 10:
Pedati Prumpung – Jatinegara Station – Bea Cukai Ahmad Yani – Utan Kayu Rawamangun – Pemuda – Kayu Putih Rawasari – Pulomas Bypass Corridor 2 :
Bekasi Terminal – Cempaka Putih – Pedongkelan – ASMI – Pulomas – Bermis – Pulo Gadung Terminal

(APTB 02) Bekasi–Kampung Rambutan Terminal Transjakarta Feeder
The feeder will be integrated with Transjakarta Corridor 7.

(APTB 03) Poris Plawad–Tomang Transjakarta Feeder
On June 20, 2012, Poris Plawad–Tomang (East Tangerang) Transjakarta Feeder began serving from Poris Plawad Tangerang Bus Station to Kali Deres Bus Station vice versa. The bus runs every 10 minutes and after one month operation the passengers is still around 2 to 5 persons only.

(APTB 04) Ciputat–Kota Bus Terminal Transjakarta Feeder
On October 4, 2012, South Tangerang Transjakarta Feeder began serving from Ciputat Bus Station to Kota Bus Terminal vice versa through: Ciputat – Pasar Jumat – Lebak Bulus – Metro Pondok Indah – Radio Dalam – Panglima Polim – Sisingamangaraja – Sudirman – Thamrin – Medan Merdeka Barat – Mangga Dua Raya

(APTB 05) Cibinong–Grogol Terminal Transjakarta Feeder
On December 7, 2012, Cibinong Transjakarta Feeder begun serve from Cibinong Bus Station to Grogol Terminal vice versa through:

- All stations in Transjakarta Corridor 9 (Sutoyo BKN, Cawang UKI, BNN until Grogol)
- Transit to Transjakarta Corridors 7 and 10 can be done at Stations Sutoyo BKN and Cawang UKI

(APTB 06) Bogor–Rawamangun Terminal Transjakarta Feeder
On March 6, 2013, Bogor Transjakarta Feeder begun serve from Bogor Bus Station to Rawamangun Terminal (APTB 06) vice versa and cross Transjakarta Corridor 4 (Pulo Gadung–Dukuh Atas) and Corridor 9 (Pinang Ranti–Pluit).

(APTB 07) Bekasi–Tanah Abang Transjakarta Feeder
On May 21, 2013, Bekasi–Tanah Abang Transjakarta Feeder began serving from Bekasi Bus Station to Tanah Abang Bus Station vice versa through Juanda street, Joyomartono, Jakarta–Cikampek Toll Road, Inner Ring Toll Road, Semanggi, Sudirman, Thamrin, Kebon Sirih, Fachrudin, Jati Baru and then turn at under Jati Baru Fly Over.

(APTB 08) Bekasi–Bundaran HI Transjakarta Feeder
On May 21, 2013, Bekasi–HI Circle (Bundaran HI) Transjakarta Feeder begun serve from Bekasi Bus Station to HI Circle vice versa through Juanda street, Joyomartono, Jakarta–Cikampek Toll Road, Inner Ring Toll Road, Gatot Subroto, Semanggi, Sudirman and HI Circle.

(APTB 09) Bogor–Blok M Terminal Transjakarta Feeder

(APTB 10) Cileungsi–Blok M Terminal Transjakarta Feeder

(APTB 11) Bogor–Tanah Abang Transjakarta Feeder

(APTB 12) Bogor–Tanjung Priok Transjakarta Feeder

(APTB 13) Poris Plawad–Pulogadung Transjakarta Feeder
On December 27, 2013, Poris Plawad–Pulogadung (East Tangerang) Transjakarta Feeder began serving as replacement of Patas AC 115.

(APTB 14) Cikarang–Kalideres Terminal Transjakarta Feeder
On January 24, 2014, Cikarang Transjakarta Feeder begun serve from Cikarang Bus Station to Kalideres Terminal vice versa.

=== Bus terminal feeder ===
Starting on February 1, 2017, Badan Pengelola Trans Jabodetabek (BPTJ) operates 4 new feeder routes from and to 4 terminals throughout Jakarta to Pulo Gebang terminal. The aim of this feeder service is to give intercity bus passengers ease to get to the bus terminal.

- Route 11C Tanjung Priok – Pulo Gebang (CLOSED), 11C became Rusun Pinus Elok–Rusun Pulo Gebang (Rental Apartment feeder)
- Route 11E Lebak Bulus – Pulo Gebang (CLOSED)
- Route 11F Pasar Minggu – Pulo Gebang (CLOSED)
- Route 11H Pinang Ranti – Pulo Gebang (CLOSED)

=== Transjakarta-KWK feeder ===
Some angkot fleets of Koperasi Wahana Kalpika (KWK) with a Transjakarta sticker in front of the vehicles had served as a Transjakarta-KWK feeder, with the operational schedule 05.00-09.00 and 16.00-20.00. The blue color integration card of Transjakarta-KWK price was Rp 15,000 for a month, while Transjakarta card or is called e-ticket had brown color. The integrated routes were:

- B03 Meruya–Grogol
- B08 Indosiar – Rawa Buaya
- S14 Petukangan Utara – Lebak Bulus
- T03 Arundina – Rumah Sakit Harapan Bunda
- T07 Condet – Cililitan
- T24 Poncol – Rawamangun
- T31 Pejuang Jaya – Harapan Indah
- U03 Terminal Pulogebang – Tanjung Priok
- U04 Kelapa Gading – Terminal Rawamangun
- U05 Tanjung Priok – Bulak Turi

Integration contract with KWK ended on December 31, 2017. The feeder is later succeeded by OK Otrip, which later become the present-day Mikrotrans.

== See also ==
- Transjakarta
- List of free public transport routes (Worldwide)
- Free public transport
- Transport in Indonesia
- Rail transport in Indonesia
