= Citra Sentul Raya =

Citra Sentul Raya is a township development at Sentul, Indonesia. It is about 50 kilometres (31 mi) south of Indonesia's capital city, Jakarta. Citra Sentul Raya is located at the western foot of the Jonggol Mountains, it makes the climate here cooler than Jakarta. The project is being developed by a joint operation between Ciputra Residence with PT Tridaya Semesta and PT Sarana Golf Utama. The township is designed to be an integrated city area based on transit-oriented development (TOD) with an area of about 1,000 hectares (2,500 acres).

== Transportation ==
Citra Sentul Raya can be accessed by Jagorawi toll road from Jakarta and Bogor. It will also have a station of Greater Jakarta LRT which is now under-construction.

== See also ==
- Babakan Madang
