= Sentul City, Indonesia =

Housing area in Bogor Regency, Indonesia

Sentul City
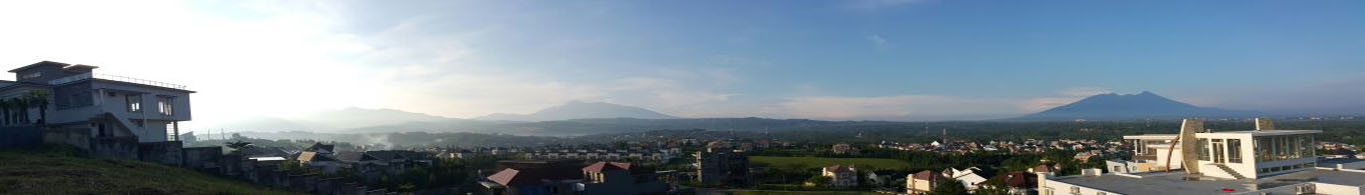
- View of Sentul City
- Location: Babakan Madang, Bogor Regency, West Java, Indonesia
- Status: Complete
- Constructed: January 1994
- Website: www.sentulcity.co.id

Companies
- Owner: PT Sentul City Tbk. (IDX: BKSL)

Technical details
- Size: ±3.000 ha

Sentul City (previously Bukit Sentul) is a modern housing area situated at Sentul, Babakan Madang, Bogor Regency, in West Java, Indonesia. Its geographical coordinates are 6 52' 0" South, 112 26' 0" East and its original name (with diacritics) is Sentul. Located near Bogor, it is about 48 km south of Indonesia's capital city, Jakarta. Sentul City is located at the western foot of the Jonggol Mountains, it is a mountainous township with an area of approximately 3100 hectares.

== Company ==
Sentul City is managed by a public company named PT Sentul City Tbk, founded on 16 April 1993. This company has changed its name several times, namely PT Sentragriya Kharisma (1993), PT Royal Sentul Highlands (1993-1997 ), PT Bukit Sentul Tbk (1997-2006) and PT Sentul City Tbk (2006-present). The company started marketing the Bukit Sentul area in September 1993. Sentul City Tbk has been listed on the Indonesia Stock Exchange since 30 June 1997, initially releasing its 400 million holdings for IDR 500/share.

The majority of ownership of PT Sentul City Tbk is currently controlled by PT Sakti Generasi Perdana (80.4%), Public (12.9%) and Stella Isabella Djohan (6.7%). PT Sakti Generasi Perdana is also fully owned by Stella Isabella Djohan. Previously, this company was owned by PT Asriland (Bambang Trihatmodjo) together with Kaestindo, which is controlled by the brothers Kwee Cahyadi Kumala (Swie Teng) and Kwee Haryadi Kumala.

Gatra reported that “Swie Teng is known to be close to Tomy Winata, who reputedly possesses a great many networks in the ranks of law enforcement officials. Swie Teng himself is known as a specialist in land clearance… People close to Tomy Winata acknowledge that Tomy has indeed long been close to Swie Teng.”

During its development, this company was caught in several controversies, which ultimately led to Kwee Cahyadi's conviction of bribery in 2015.

== Infrastructure ==
Sentul International Convention Center is located in the township. It is also the location of a 3.9 km long racing circuit that has been used predominantly for bike racing and the Asian F3 series. The township has hotels, shopping malls (Bellanova Country Mall and AEON Mall Sentul City), culinary center, children's amusement park, a national drug rehab centre, an eco-tour development, and two golf courses, an IKEA store, etc. A cultural park known as Taman Budaya Sentul, which is built with a Sundanese cultural concept. Citra Sentul Raya is also located in this township.

After recent years of slow growth, recent developments include AEON shopping mall. The Opus Park is located in the township consists of three apartment towers. With an area of 7.8 hectares, it has also a shopping mall and five-star hotels.

== Transportation ==
Sentul is connected to Jakarta and Bogor by Jagorawi Toll Road, as well as the Bogor Ring Road that links to the Bogor city center. Transjakarta operates one feeder route from Bogor to Blok M in Jakarta, namely route P11, which serves Sentul City by providing a bus stop near Bellanova Country Mall and Sentul Selatan Toll Plaza, serving both directions. It will also have a station of Jabodebek LRT Cibubur Line extension to Bogor, which is now under feasibility study.

== See also ==
- Bekasi river
