= Kebayoran (Transjakarta) =

Bus rapid transit station in Jakarta, Indonesia

8 07 Kebayoran
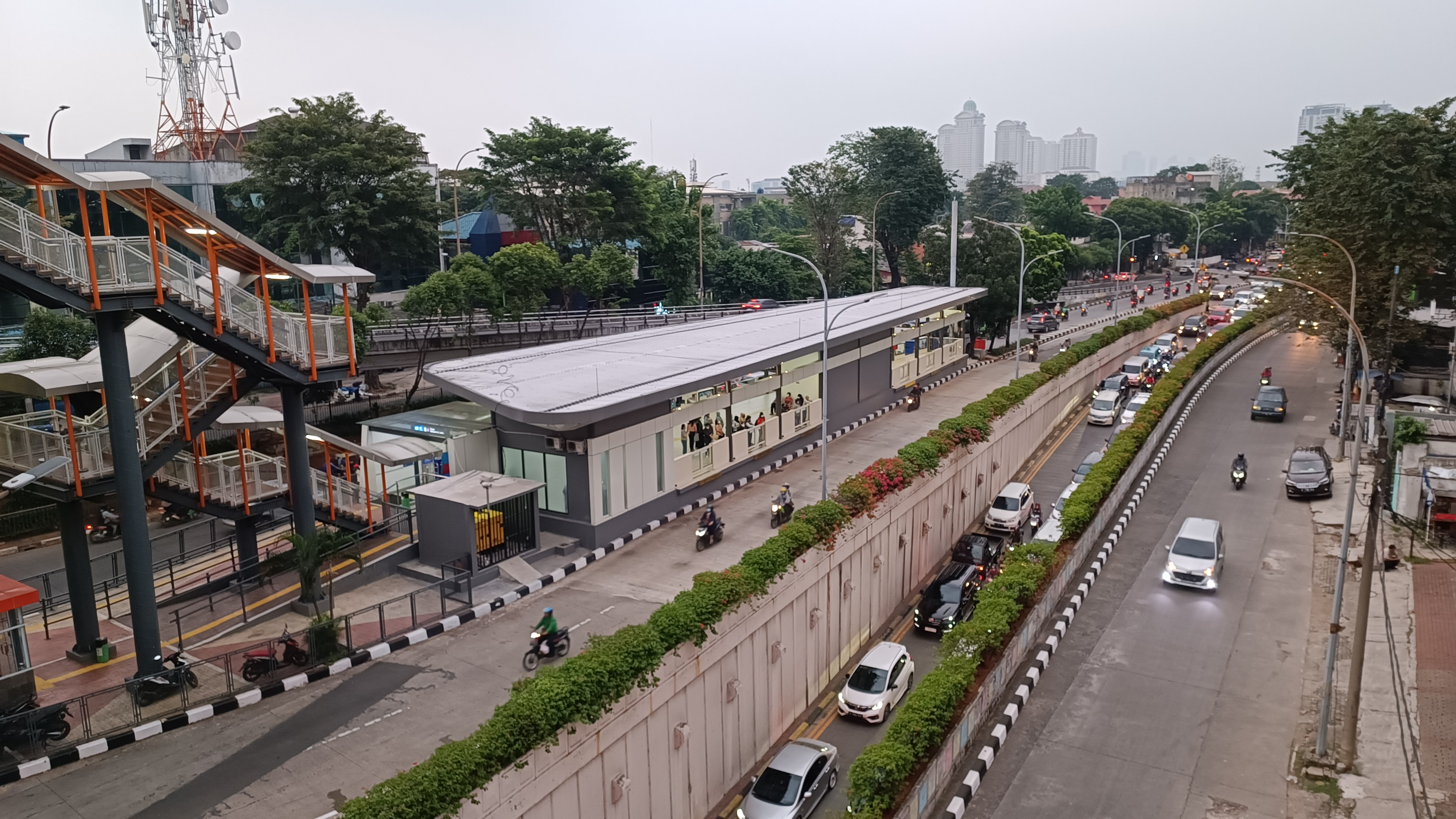
- View from the transfer linkway

General information
- Location: Teuku Nyak Arif Street, Kebayoran Lama Utara, Kebayoran Lama, South Jakarta 12240, Indonesia
- Coordinates: 6.238444°S 106.783209°E
- Owner: Transjakarta
- Operator: Transjakarta
- Lines: List of TransJakarta corridors#Corridor 8
- Platforms: Single island platform
- Connections: Velbak; Kebayoran

Construction
- Structure type: At-grade
- Cycle facilities: No

Other information
- Status: In service

History
- Opened: 21 February 2009
- Rebuilt: 6 February 2023; 3 years ago
- Former names: Pasar Kebayoran Lama

Services
Preceding		Following
Bungur towards Lebak Bulus	Corridor 8 via Tomang	Simprug towards Pasar Baru
Bungur towards Lebak Bulus	Corridor 8 via Cideng	Simprug towards Pasar Baru
Kebayoran Lama towards CBD Ciledug	Corridor 13 05:00-22:00 transfer at Velbak	Mayestik towards Tegal Mampang
Kebayoran Lama towards Puri Beta 2	Corridor 13 Route 13B transfer at Velbak	Mayestik towards Pancoran
Kebayoran Lama towards Puri Beta 2	Corridor 13 Route 13E Only available on weekends transfer at Velbak	Mayestik towards Flyover Kuningan
Petukangan d'Masiv towards Puri Beta 2	Corridor 13 Route L13E Only available on weekdays transfer at Velbak	CSW 1 towards Flyover Kuningan
Location

Kebayoran is a Transjakarta bus rapid transit station located on Teuku Nyak Arif Street, Kebayoran Lama Utara, Kebayoran Lama, South Jakarta, Indonesia, serving Corridor 8. It is connected by a transfer skybridge to the Velbak BRT station that serves Corridor 13 as well as the Kebayoran KRL station on the Rangkasbitung Line.

== History ==
The station opened as Pasar Kebayoran Lama on 21 February 2009, together with the rest of Corridor 8.

In March 2022, the government started the construction of the transfer skybridge to connect the station to Corridor 13 and Rangkasbitung Line, in order to form a new transit-oriented development zone. On 5 September 2022, the station was closed for revitalisation works to facilitate the construction of the transfer skybridge. The skybridge opened for public trial on 21–24 January 2023 and was inaugurated on 27 January 2023 by the Acting Governor of Jakarta, Heru Budi Hartono.

The station reopened on 6 February 2023, 13 days after the skybridge opened. It was renamed simply Kebayoran in late December 2023, named after the KRL station that it is now connected to.

== Station layout ==
East	towards Lebak Bulus (Bungur) →
Island platform, doors open on the right
West	← (Simprug)	towards Pasar Baru

== Non-BRT bus services ==
Type	Route	Destination	Notes
Inner city feeder		Rempoa—Blok M	Outside the station
Inner city feeder		Kebayoran—Tanah Abang	Outside the station
Inner city feeder		Blok M—Joglo	Inside the station
Inner city feeder		Bintaro—Blok M	Inside the station
Inner city feeder		Kebayoran–Petamburan	Inside the station
Inner city feeder		Kebayoran—Jelambar	Inside the station
Mikrotrans Jak Lingko	JAK 93	Kebayoran Station—Kebon Jeruk	Outside the station

== Places nearby ==
- Gandaria City

== Criticisms and controversies ==
The Kebayoran Lama skybridge initially attracted criticism because it was mostly within Transjakarta's paid area, as it was constructed for paid BRT transfers and not for public crossing. This meant that pedestrians were forced to pay to enter Transjakarta's paid area for crossing the street, even without using the BRT services. In response, Transjakarta installed a separator in the middle of the skybridge, separating the paid transfer area and the public area, so that pedestrians could use the skybridge to cross the street without entering the BRT system.

== Gallery ==
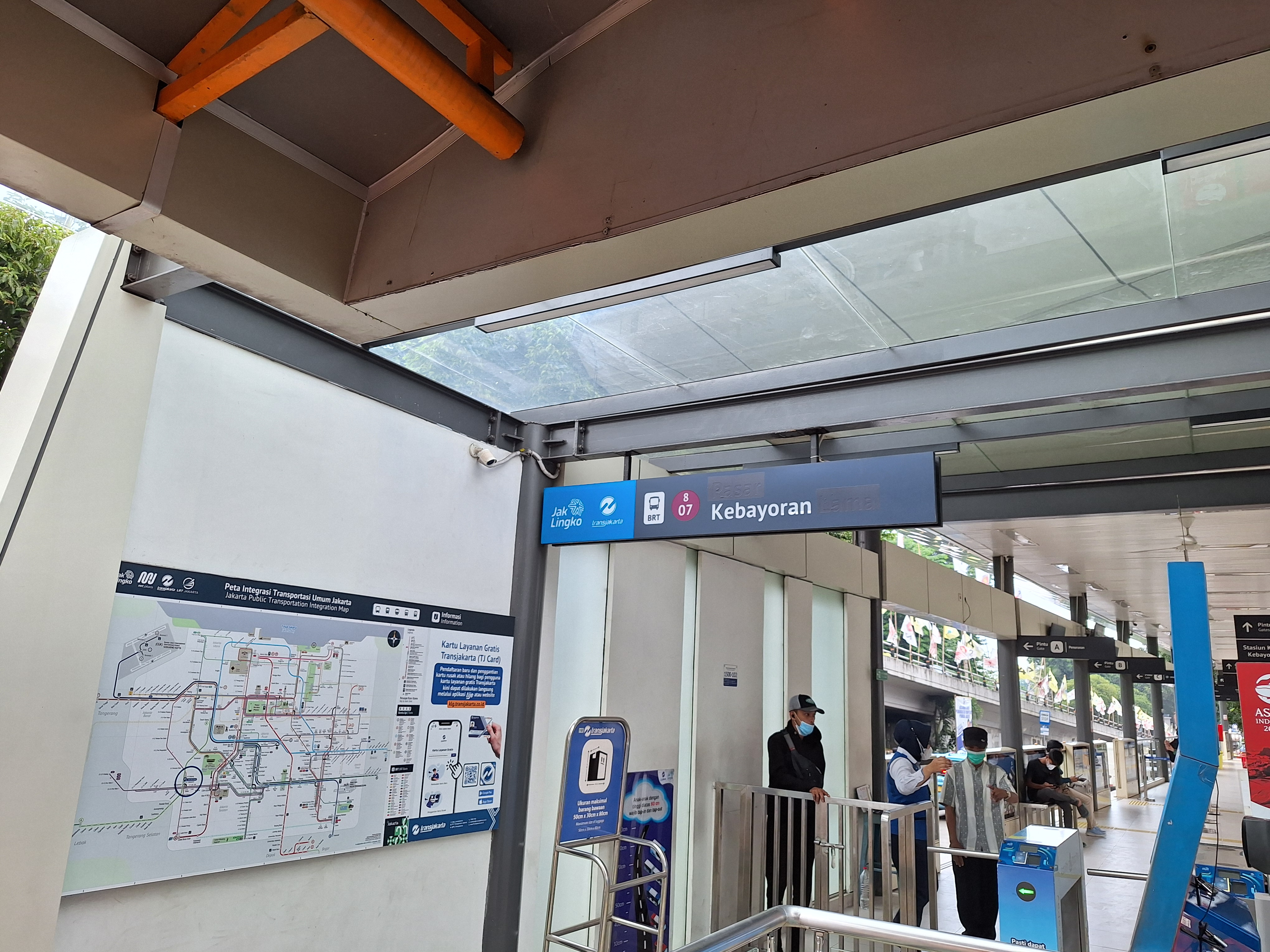
Kebayoran station name signage, 2024

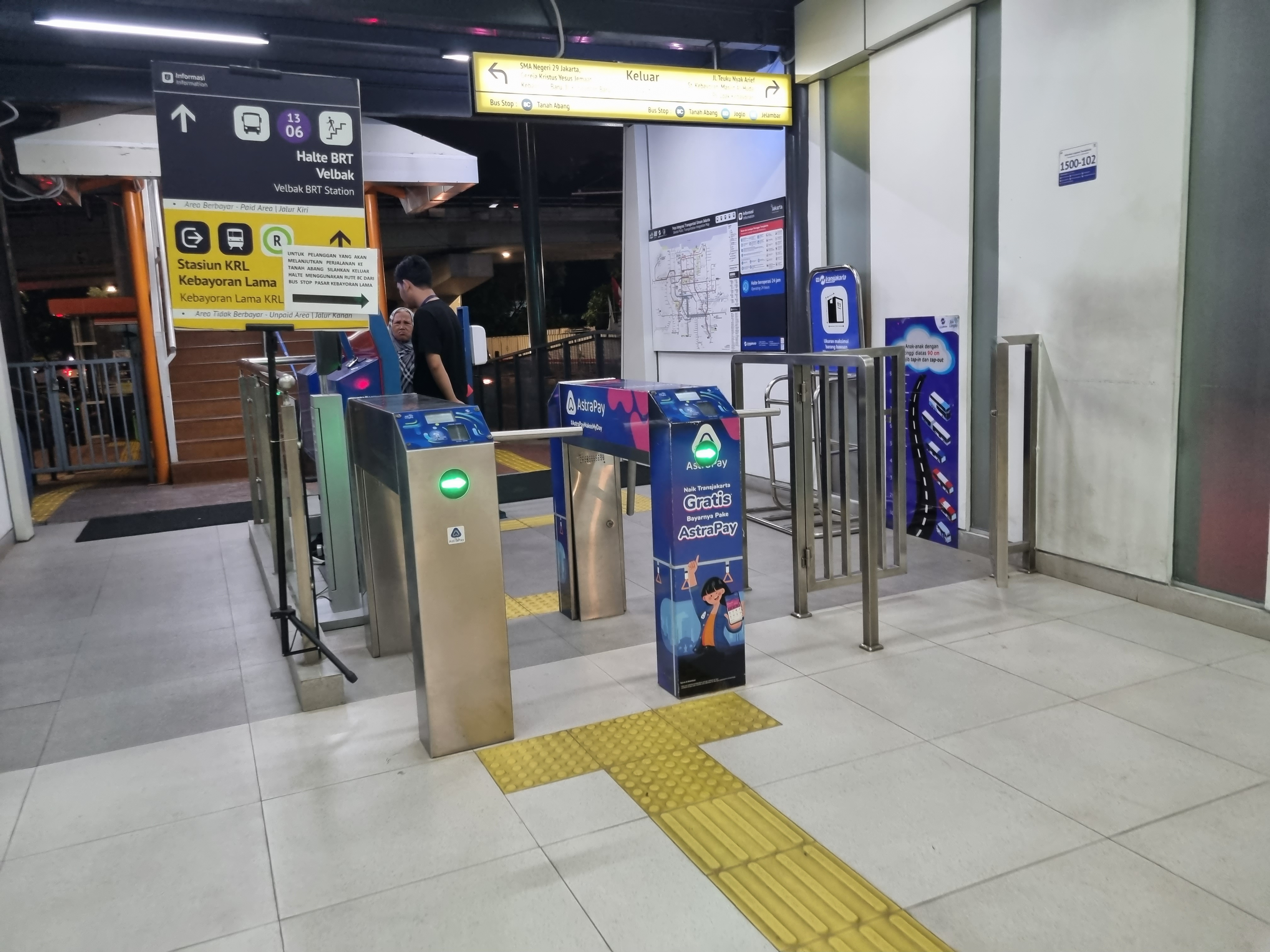
Fare gates at the entrance, 2024

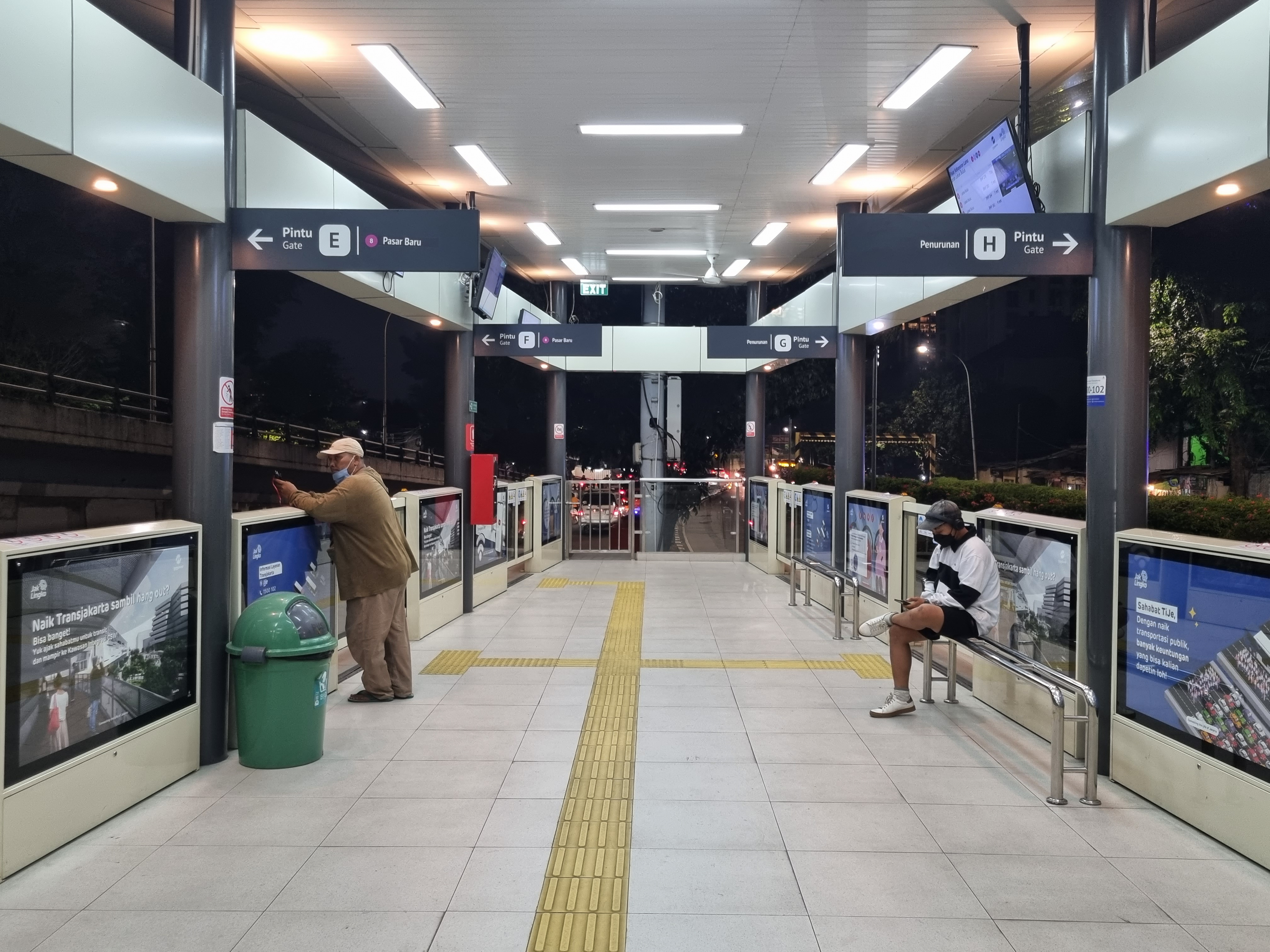
Interior of the station

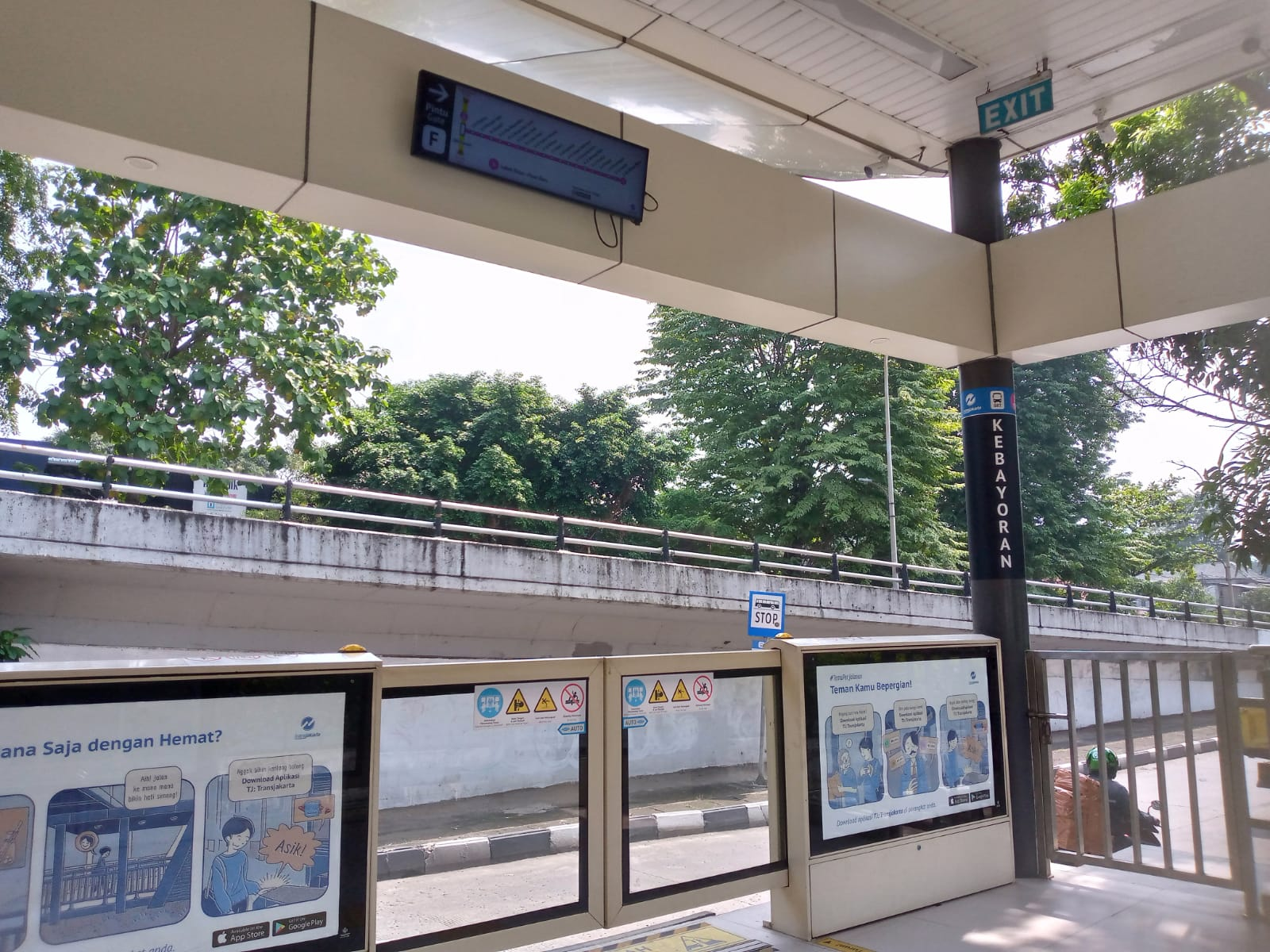
Northbound platform towards Pasar Baru

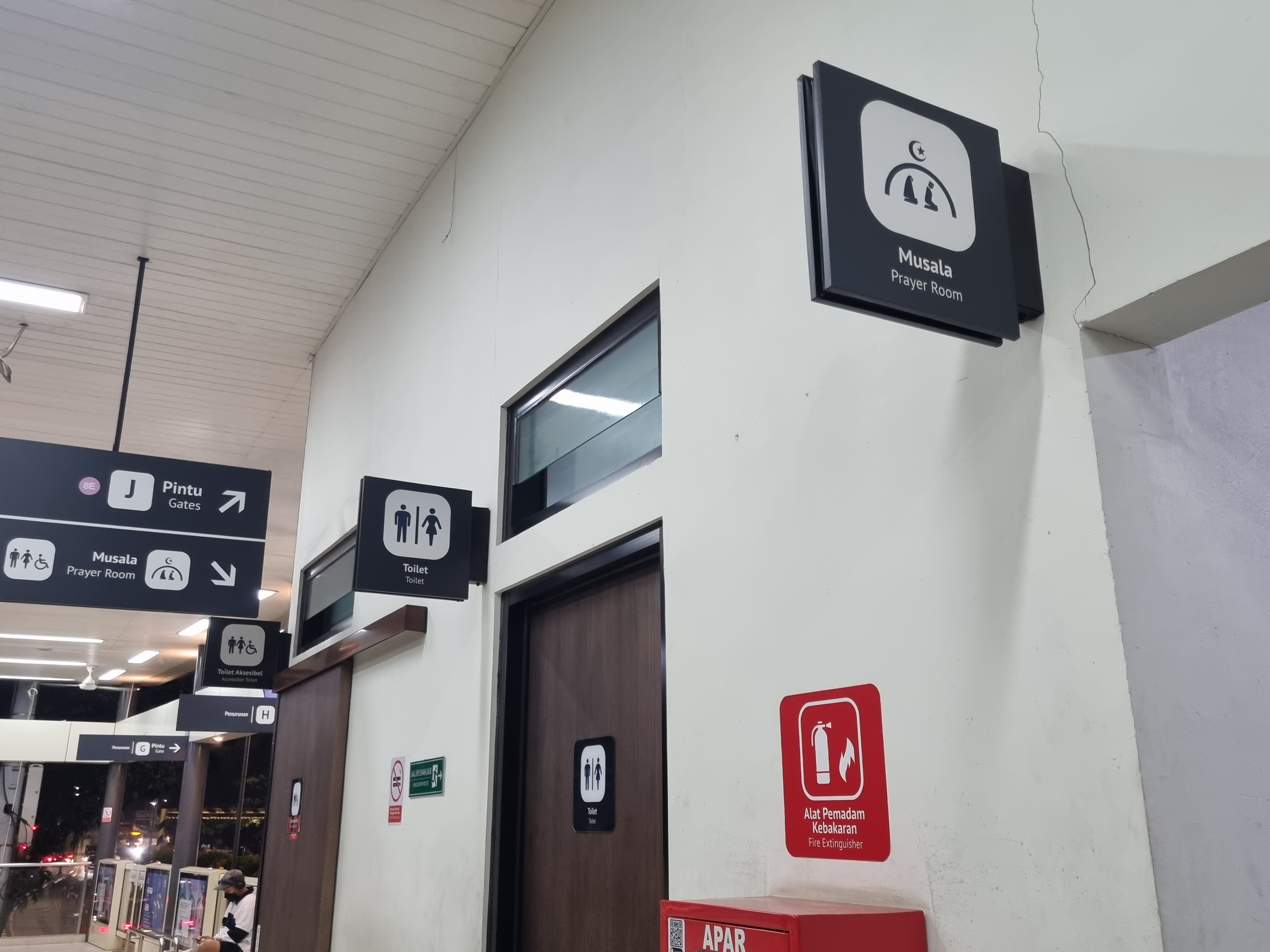
Priority toilet and prayer room
