= Velbak (Transjakarta) =

Bus rapid transit station in Jakarta, Indonesia

13 06 Velbak
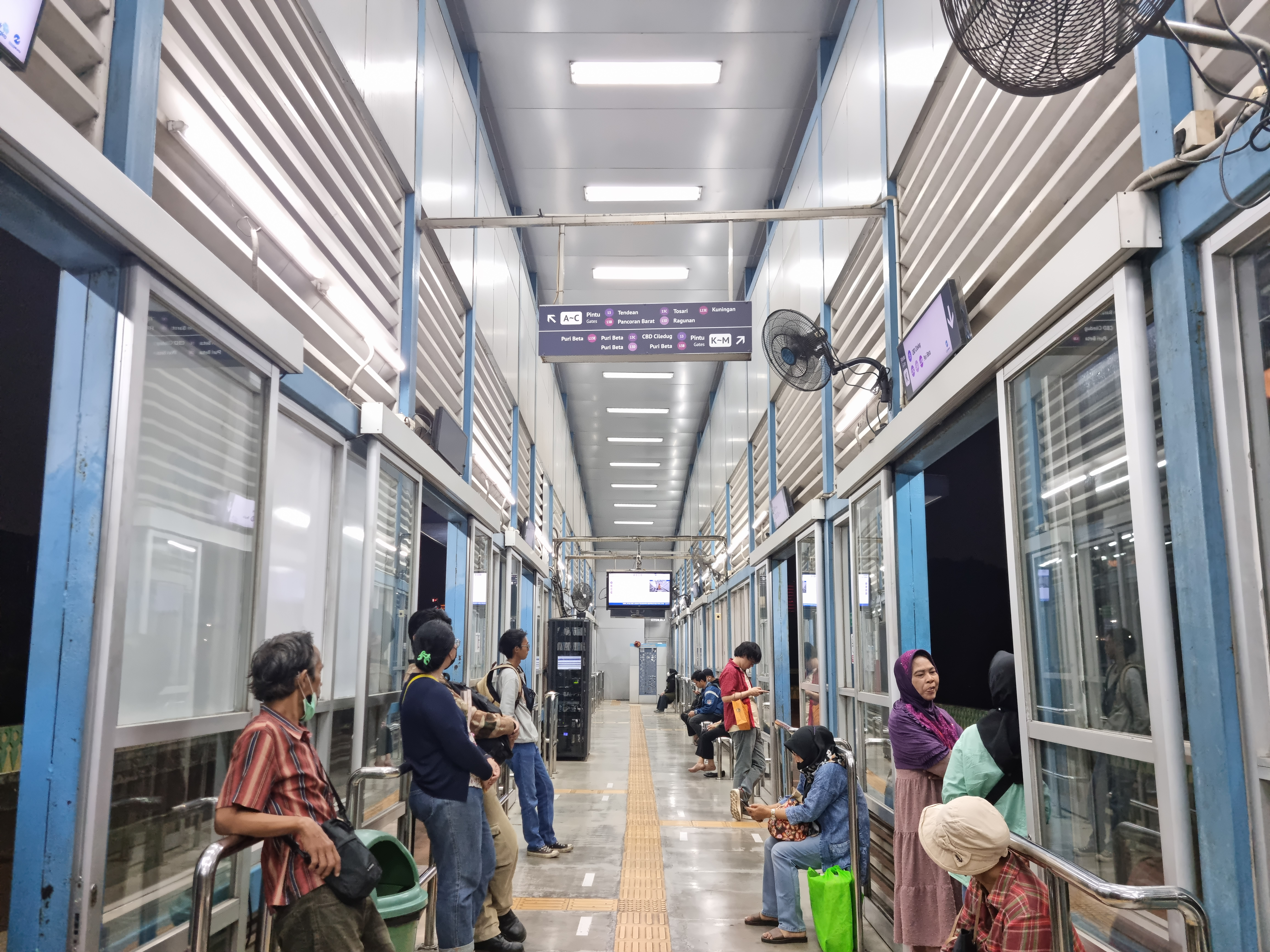
- View of the platform area

General information
- Location: Ciledug Raya Street; Gunung, Kebayoran Baru (northern side); Kramat Pela, Kebayoran Baru (southern side); South Jakarta, Indonesia
- Coordinates: 6.239380°S 106.785302°E
- System: Transjakarta bus rapid transit station
- Owner: Transjakarta
- Operator: Transjakarta
- Lines: List of TransJakarta corridors#Corridor 13 List of TransJakarta corridors#Cross-corridor routes
- Platforms: Single island platform
- Connections: Kebayoran; Kebayoran

Construction
- Structure type: Elevated
- Cycle facilities: No

Other information
- Status: In service

History
- Opened: 7 July 2018
- Rebuilt: 24 December 2022

Services
Preceding		Following
Kebayoran Lama towards CBD Ciledug	Corridor 13 05:00-22:00	Mayestik towards Tegal Mampang
Kebayoran Lama towards Puri Beta 2	Corridor 13 22:00-05:00	Mayestik towards Tegal Mampang
Kebayoran Lama towards Puri Beta 2	Corridor 13 Route 13B	Mayestik towards Pancoran
Kebayoran Lama towards Puri Beta 2	Corridor 13 Route 13E Only available on weekends	Mayestik towards Flyover Kuningan
Petukangan d'Masiv towards Puri Beta 2	Corridor 13 Route L13E Only available on weekdays	CSW 1 towards Flyover Kuningan
Bungur towards Lebak Bulus	Corridor 8 via Tomang transfer at Kebayoran	Simprug towards Pasar Baru
Bungur towards Lebak Bulus	Corridor 8 via Cideng transfer at Kebayoran	Simprug towards Pasar Baru
Location

Velbak is a Transjakarta bus rapid transit station located above the Ciledug Raya Street, Gunung, Kebayoran Baru, South Jakarta, Indonesia, serving Corridor 13. It is connected by a long transfer skybridge to the Kebayoran BRT station that serves Corridor 8, as well as the Kebayoran KRL station on the Rangkasbitung Line.

The name "Velbak" comes from the Dutch words vuil, which means "trash", and bak, which means "bin" or "storage". The area where the BRT station stands was often called vuilnisbak (lit. 'Trash bin'), which refers to a landfill that used to exist near the Grogol River at south of the station, that also borders Kebayoran Baru from Kebayoran Lama. The name vuilnisbak later deformed into vuilbak, and later to simply velbak.

== History ==
Velbak BRT station only opened on 7 July 2018, almost nine months after the official opening of Corridor 13 in August 2017, due to the lighting works that were still ongoing when the line started operations. The station was the second last to open, alongside Rawa Barat station, before CSW 1 station opened many years later.

In March 2022, construction of a new skybridge was started to connect Velbak station with Kebayoran station to make an interchange between Corridors 8 and 13, as well as to integrate them with Kebayoran KRL station. As a follow-up, Velbak was closed on 29 August 2022 for escalator installation. Although the skybridge was still under construction, the station reopened on 24 December 2022. The skybridge opened for public trial on 21-24 January 2023 and was inaugurated on 27 January 2023 by the Acting Governor of Jakarta, Heru Budi Hartono. The skybridge initially attracted criticism as it was entirely within Transjakarta's paid area, forcing pedestrians to tap their card and pay even for crossing the road without using the BRT services. In response, Transjakarta installed a separator in the middle of the bridge to separate the paid transfer area from the unpaid public area to allow pedestrians to use the bridge to cross the street without entering the BRT system.

== Station layout ==
North	towards Tegal Mampang and towards Pancoran	towards Flyover Kuningan (Mayestik/CSW 1) →
Island platform, doors open on the right
South	← (Kebayoran Lama/Petukangan d'Masiv) towards CBD Ciledug and towards Puri Beta 2

== Non-BRT bus services ==
The following non-BRT services serve areas around Velbak station, last updated on 17 September 2024:

Type	Route	Destination	Notes
Transjakarta Non-BRT		Pesanggrahan— Blok M	Outside the station
Transjakarta Non-BRT		Meruya Selatan—Blok M	Outside the station
Transjakarta Non-BRT		Velbak—Pasar Minggu via Jeruk Purut	Outside the station
Transjakarta Non-BRT		Blok M—Joglo	Outside the station
Transjakarta Non-BRT		Bintaro—Blok M	Inside Kebayoran station
Transjakarta Non-BRT		Kebayoran—Petamburan via Asia Afrika Street	Inside Kebayoran station
Mikrotrans Jak Lingko	JAK 93	Kebayoran Lama—Jeruk Purut	Outside the station

== Gallery ==
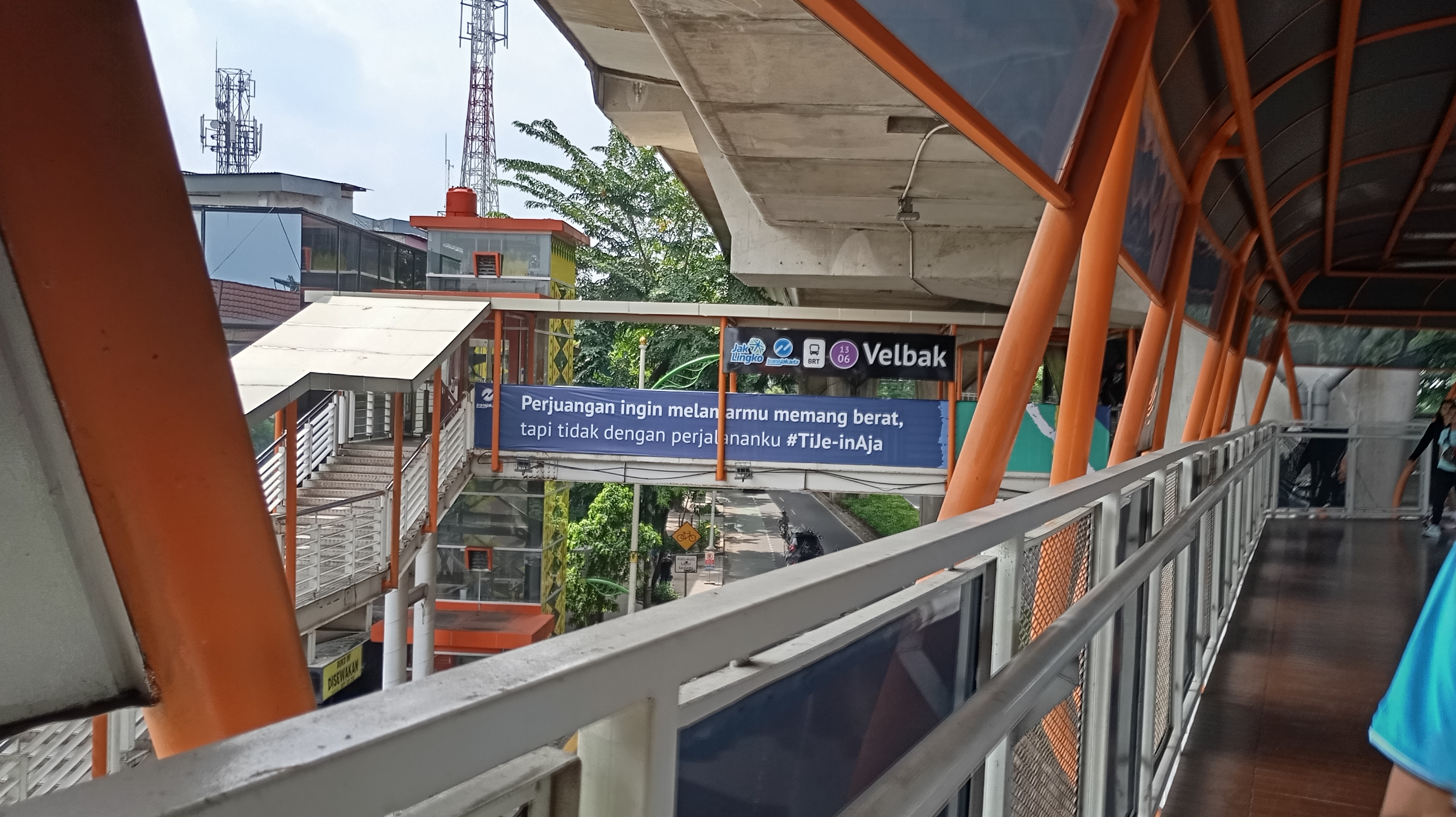
The station viewed from the skybridge

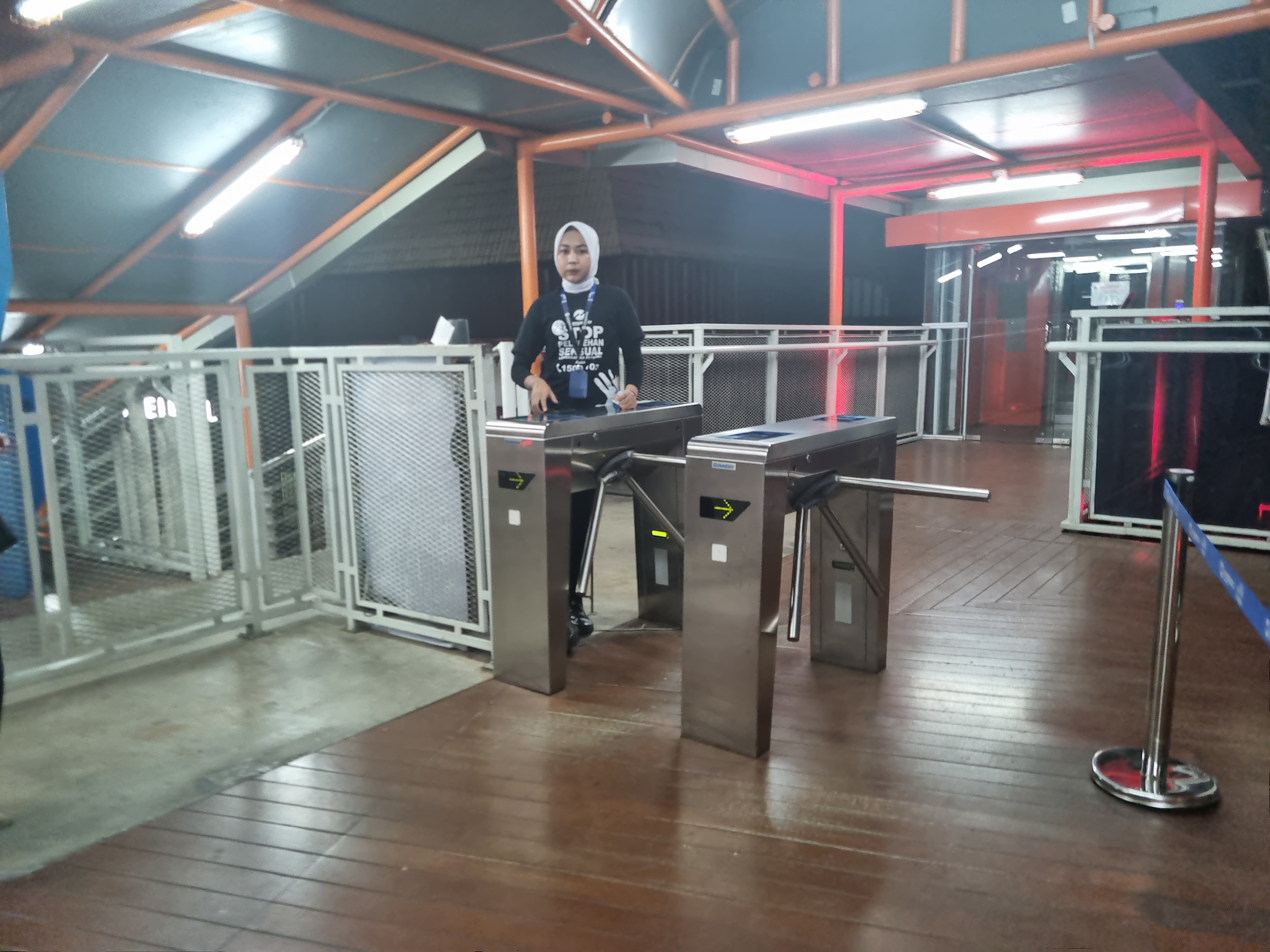
Fare gates, 2023

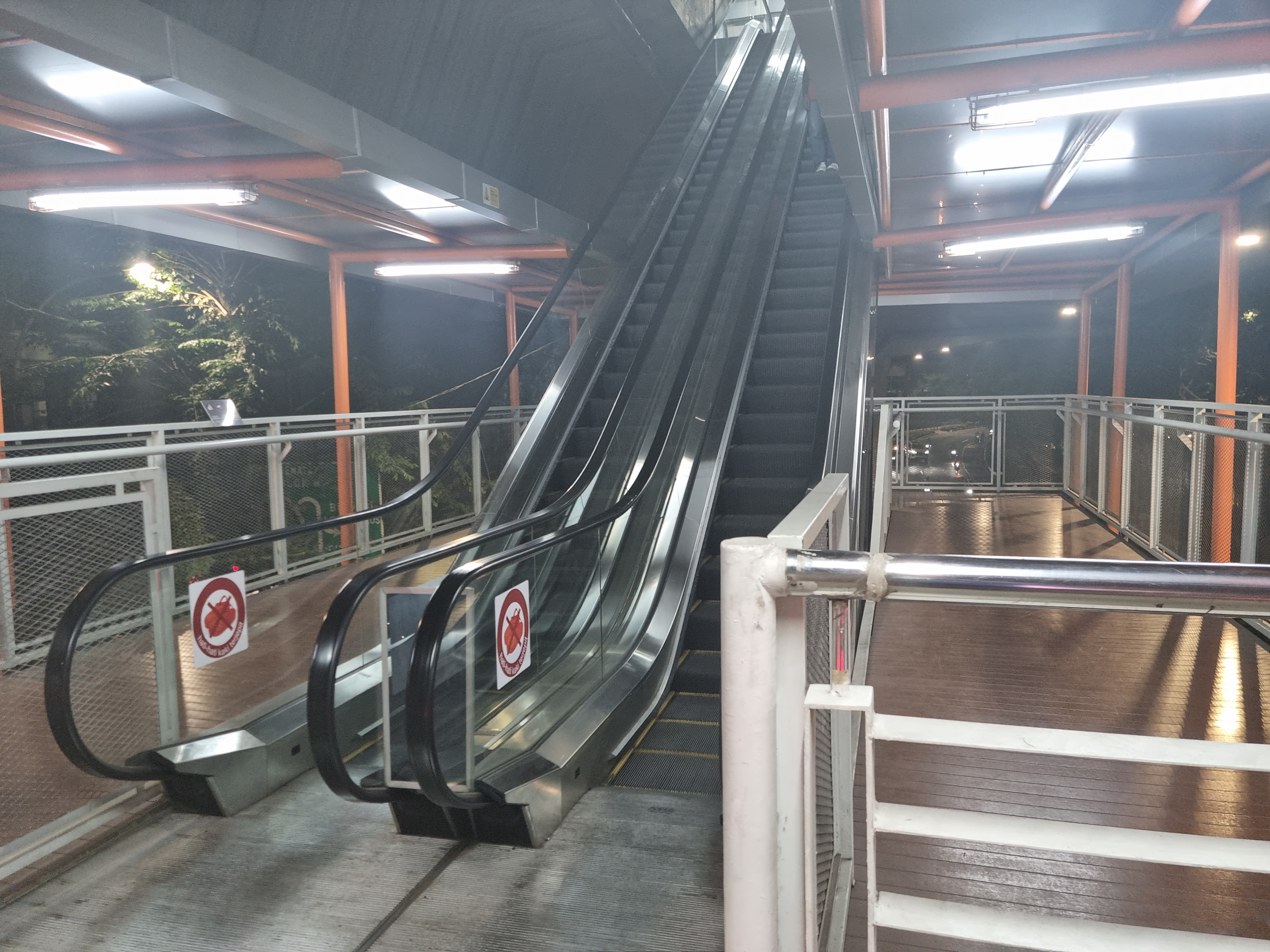
Escalators, 2023

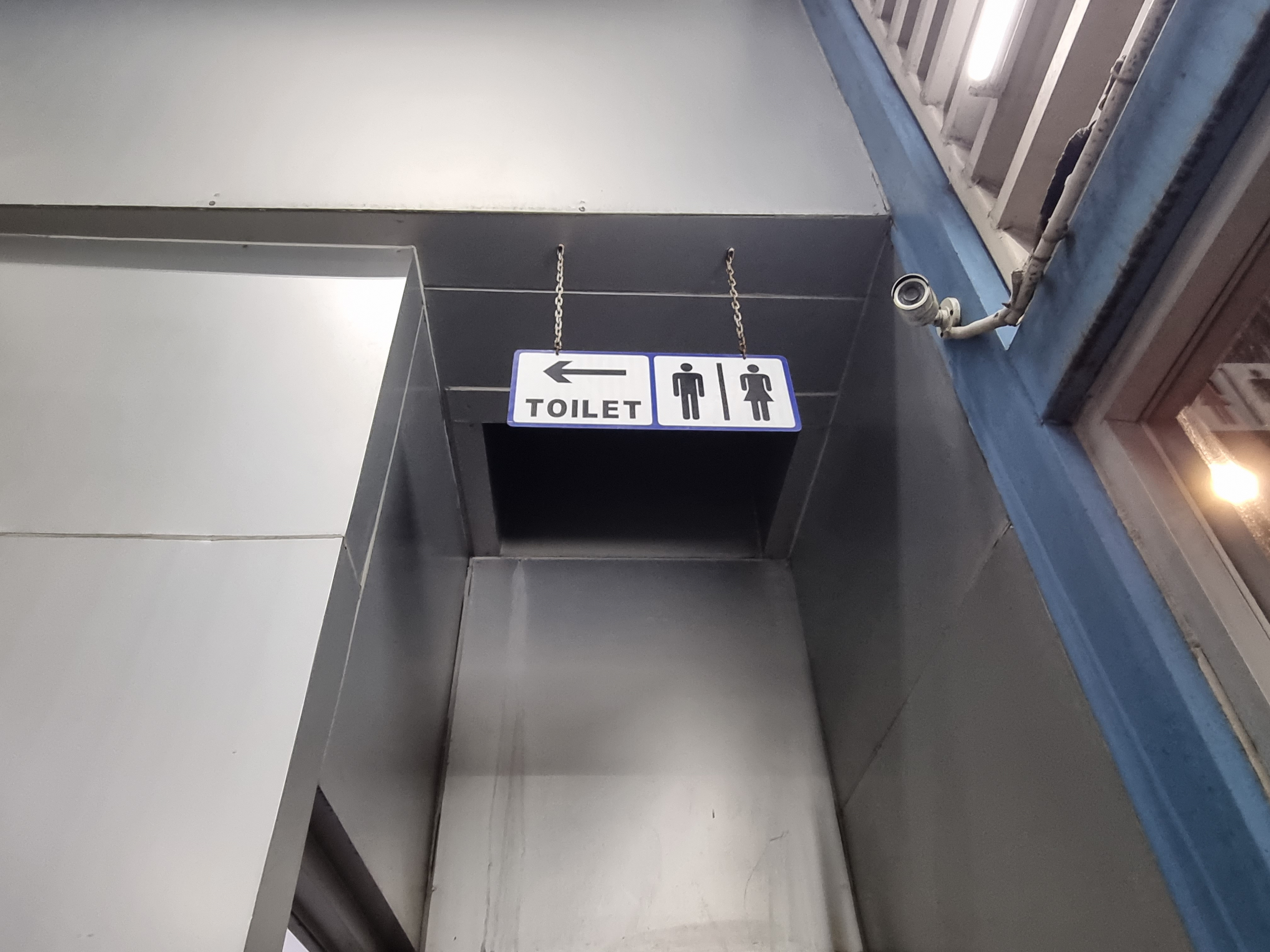
Toilets inside the station

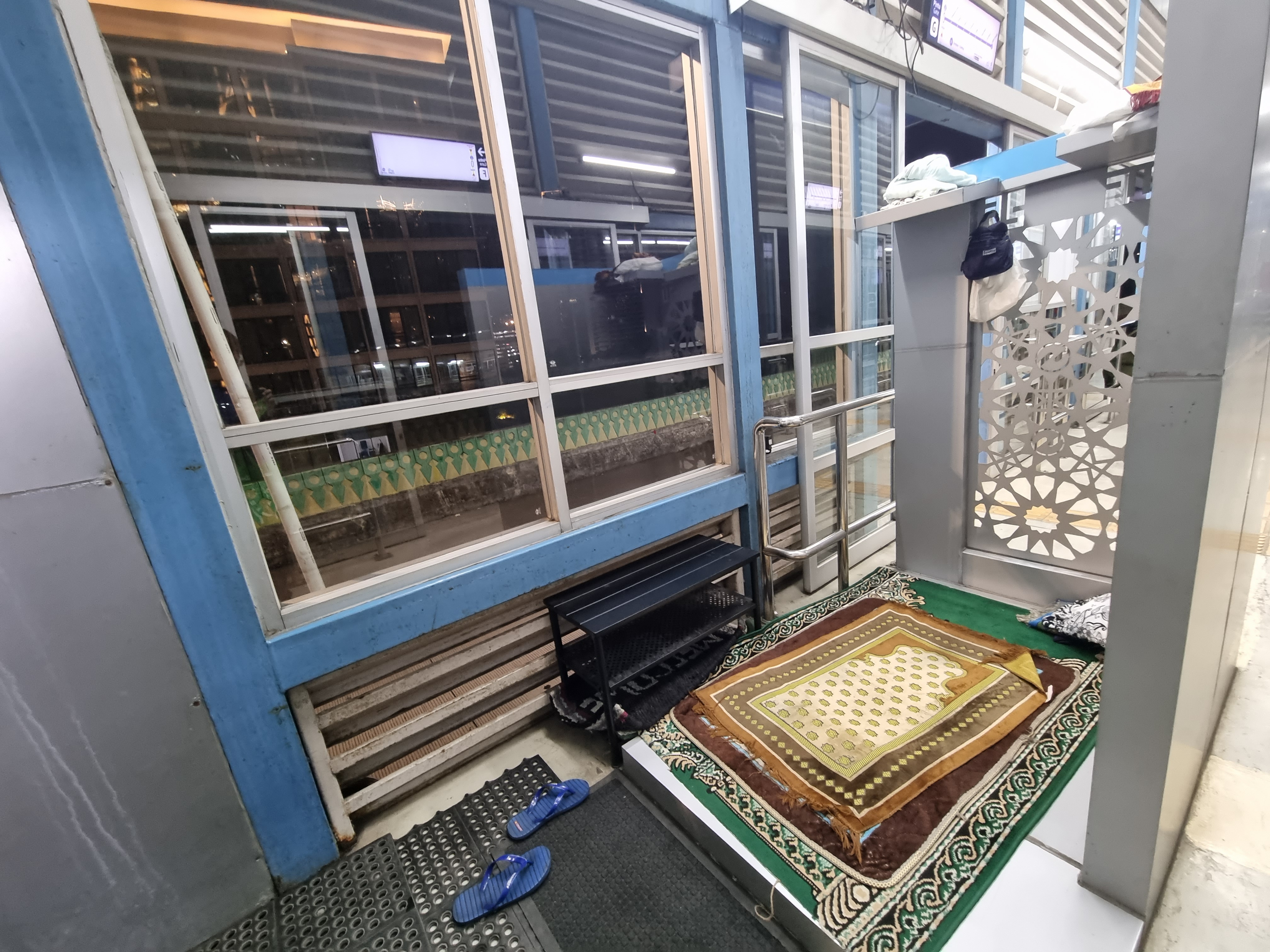
Praying room inside the station
