= Transjakarta Corridor 13 =

Bus rapid transit route in Indonesia

- CBD Ciledug – Tegal Mampang
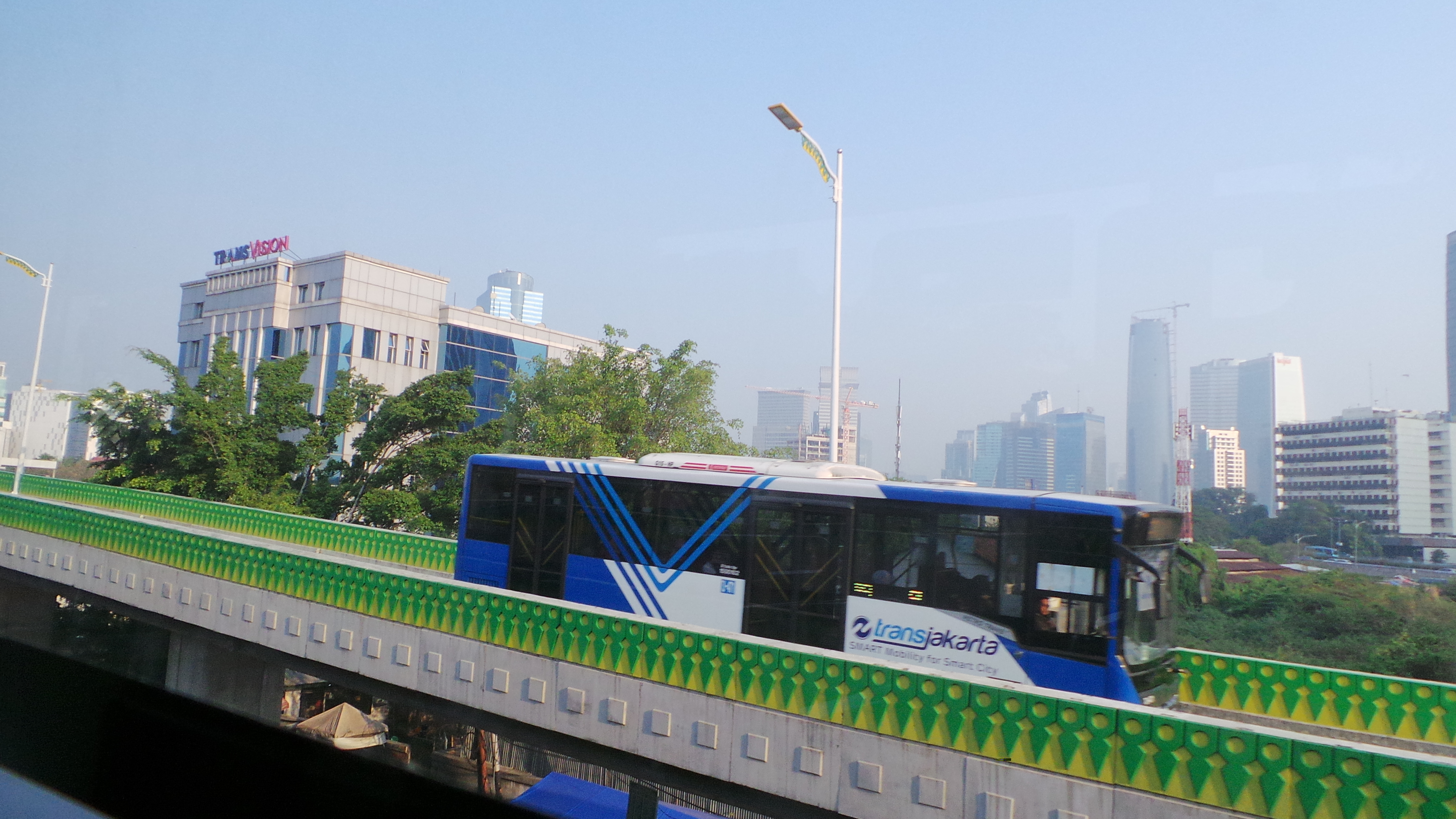
- Corridor 13 is the first Transjakarta corridor that uses a dedicated elevated bus lane

Overview
- System: Transjakarta
- Operator: PT. Transportasi Jakarta (TJ, infrastructure, fleets, drivers, and officers); Mayasari Bakti (MB/MYS, fleets and drivers); Bianglala Metropolitan (BMP, fleets and drivers)
- Began service: 13 August 2017

Route
- Route type: Elevated Bus Rapid Transit
- Locale: Tangerang; South Jakarta
- Length: 14.18 km
- Stations: 15

Transjakarta Corridor 13 is a bus rapid transit corridor in Greater Jakarta, Indonesia, operated by Transjakarta. It serves the route from CBD Ciledug BRT station in Tangerang, Banten to Tegal Mampang BRT station in Mampang Prapatan, South Jakarta. The roads traversed by Corridor 13 are HOS Tjokroaminoto (Tangerang), Ciledug Raya, Kebayoran Lama, Kyai Maja, Trunojoyo, Wolter Monginsidi, and Kapten Tendean. The corridor has two integration points, the CSW-ASEAN TOD and Velbak BRT station; each are integrated with the MRT North–South Line and the Rangkasbitung Line of KRL Commuterline.

This is the first corridor on the BRT system to operate on a separated elevated track, running through a 9.3 kilometre long and 8 metre wide dedicated elevated bus lane, with height ranging from 18 to 24 metres above ground level. Therefore, the corridor (in overall or specifically its elevated track) is often colloquially known as the Sky Corridor or Skyway Corridor (Indonesian: Transjakarta Jalur Langit). The elevated track starts from Kapten Tendean Road where Tegal Mampang station is located and spans all the way to Ciledug Raya road near intersection with Adam Malik road, where Petukangan d'Masiv station is located. CBD Ciledug, Puri Beta 2, Puri Beta 1, Petukangan d'Masiv and Tegal Mampang BRT stations are at-grade, while JORR, Swadarma ParagonCorp, Cipulir, Seskoal, Kebayoran Lama, Velbak, Mayestik, CSW, Pasar Santa and Rawa Barat stations are along the elevated track. The important note to keep in mind is that the at-grade section between CBD Ciledug and Petukangan d'Masiv, the HOS Tjokroaminoto street of Tangerang, does not have a separated bus lane. As the section is frequently congested by traffic, the waiting time for buses of corridor 13 could be longer as the buses become stuck in traffic.

Corridor 13 is the only corridor in Transjakarta's BRT network to cross the administrative border of area governed by the Municipal Government of Jakarta, with CBD Ciledug, Puri Beta 1, and Puri Beta 2 stations being located within the city of Tangerang.

== History ==
=== Initial route plan ===
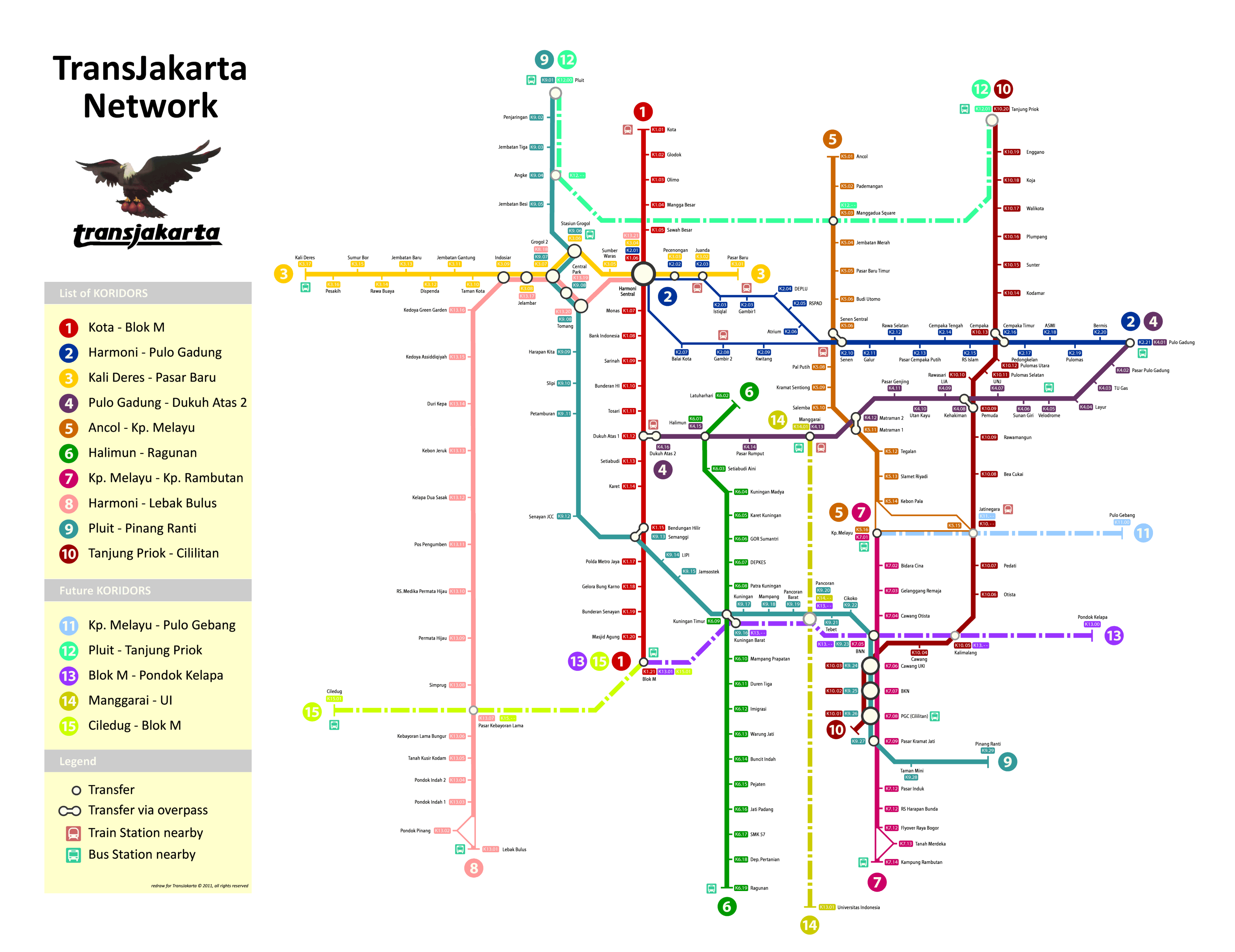
Transjakarta system map as of 2011

Since the first Transjakarta corridor was opened in 2004, there were 14 other planned corridors. Among them, three were proposed to be built elevated: Corridor 13 (initially Pondok Kelapa–Blok M), Corridor 14 (Manggarai–Universitas Indonesia), and Corridor 15 (Ciledug–Blok M) (see image). In 2014, the route plan for Corridor 13 was changed into Ciledug–Blok M–Tendean route, using the entire original route plan for Corridor 15 and partially used Corridor 13's original plan.

=== Corridor construction ===
The construction of the elevated bus lane for Corridor 13 started on Tuesday, 10 March 2015, inaugurated by the then-Vice Governor of Jakarta, Djarot Saiful Hidayat. The ceremony was held on Jalan Kebayoran Baru, Kebayoran Lama. The project, which cost Rp 2.3 trillion, was carried out by 8 different contractors at 8 different contract packages. The eight packages were the Tendean package (1,000 meters) done by PT Adhi Karya Tbk, the Santa package (1,250 meters) by PT Yasa Patrisia Perkasa, the Trunojoyo package (1,375 meters) done by PT Jaya Kontruksi, the Taman Puring package (1,200 meters) done by PT Hutama Karya, the Kebayoran Lama package (1,300 meters) is done by PT Pembangunan Perumahan Tbk, the Kostrad package (1,400 meters) was done by PT Istaka Karya CO together with PT Agra Budi, the Ciledug package (1,500 meters) was done by PT Waskita Karya Tbk, and the Seskoal Package (1,400 meters) was carried out by PT Wijaya Karya Tbk.

The development of the project ignored the aspect of accessibility of passengers, such as the CSW BRT station which was not friendly for disabled and elderly people as the number of steps is 117 and has a height of 24 meters. During the 2017 Jakarta gubernatorial election debate, it was mentioned that Corridor 13, out of 10 elevated BRT stations, only 1 used disabled-friendly sloping ramps and the rest used stairs. It was planned that those elevated stations would use elevators and escalators due to of its unfriendly accessibility for disabled and elderlies. The elevator was planned to be built at CSW BRT station, while escalators would be installed at the Cipulir, Tirtayasa, and CSW stations. CSW was the only station that uses an elevator and escalator.

=== Trial run ===
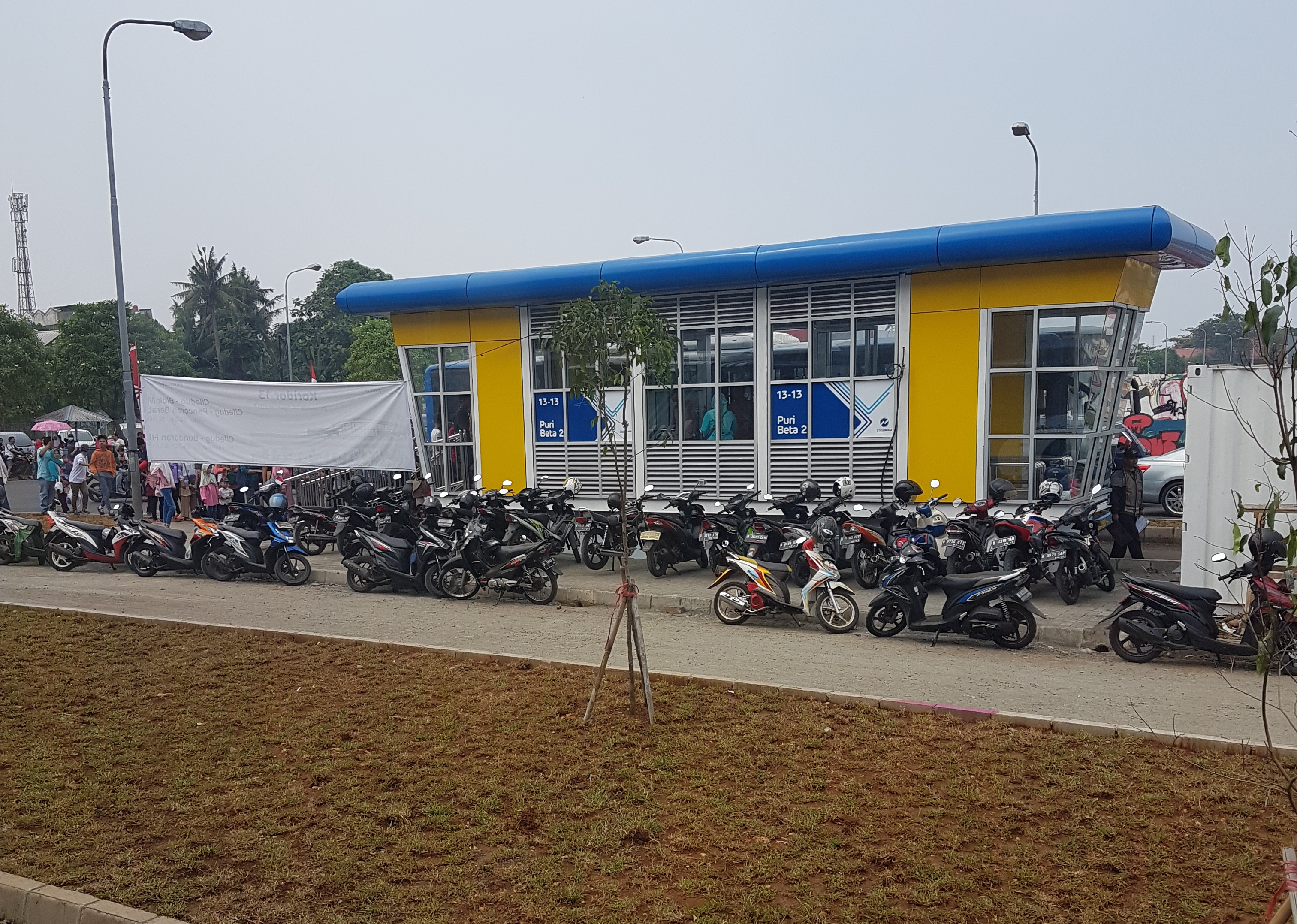
The Puri Beta 2 BRT station, one of the five at-grade stations of Corridor 13, during the opening day

On 14 March 2017, this corridor has already conducted a trial run. Transjakarta plans to prepare a fleet of 100 buses and recruit 250-300 new drivers to serve this new corridor. Based on the initial simulation, buses can run from Ciledug to Tendean (now Tegal Mampang) in 25 minutes. This travel time also includes stopping for 15–20 seconds at 12 stations that would be used.

On 6 May 2017, Corridor 13 began trials using 20 bus fleets. It was stopped on the next day due to traffic congestions in Ciledug and the Mayor of Tangerang banned the buses to enter the city, but were eventually allowed to enter the Tangerang city limit on 10 May, thanks to a negotiation between the two cities' Departments of Transportation. Trials resumed on 12 May until its inauguration.

On 12 June 2017, Corridor 13 failed to carry out a test by carrying passengers. This was due to the fact that several stations have not installed platform doors that meet the standards and the wrong placement of ticket counter which has the potential to hinder the flow of passengers at those stations. Corridor 13 still had no lights installed, so it could only operate from 06.00 to 17.00.

The schedule for the inauguration of Corridor 13 had been postponed from the original plan on 22 June to 17 August because the permit for a Certificate of Appropriate Function (Indonesian: Sertifikat Layak Fungsi or SLF) from the Ministry of Public Works and Housing (PUPR) was not issued yet, so that the elevated route has not been guaranteed safe according to PUPR. Apart from that, minor problems such as misplaced ticket counters, platform doors, and the absence of fare gates at several BRT stations were still being fixed. After carrying out static and dynamic load tests on 20 July, the certificate of the corridor's elevated route was given to the then Jakarta Governor Djarot Saiful Hidayat on 28 July 2017. The provision of SLF of Corridor 13 also coincides with the provision of SLF of two new ramps on the Semanggi Interchange.

=== Early operational ===
Corridor 13 operates on 13 August 2017. On the first day of operation, it was free of charge for 1 day from 09.00 to 19.00 with the main Ciledug–Tendean (now Tegal Mampang) route, alongside supporting cross-corridor routes to Blok M, Cawang UKI (now Cawang Sentral), Tosari and Ragunan routes. Despite that, buses did not stop at certain stations. Operational hours were also limited to 19.00, because the lights have not been installed on the elevated track. In addition, the construction of elevators and escalators were still ongoing at several BRT stations. Their operation was waiting for the completion of the installation of lights on the elevated route.

Three days later, on 16 August 2017, the Governor of Jakarta Djarot Saiful Hidayat inaugurated the operation of Corridor 13 at the Cipulir BRT station. The inauguration was carried out ahead of the commemoration of the 72nd anniversary of the Indonesian Independence Proclamation. The Speaker of the Jakarta Regional House of Representatives Prasetyo Edi Marsudi, the Mayor of Tangerang Arief Rachadiono Wismansyah, the CEO of Transjakarta Budi Kaliwono, as well as other government and Transjakarta officials also attended the inauguration ceremony; though there were still some stations that had not been completed, so they could not be operated.

It was targeted that all BRT stations would be operational in October 2017 when the lights on the elevated route have been fully installed. Transjakarta built the Puri Beta 1 BRT station which is located not far from Puri Beta 2 station, so that passengers from the direction of Tangerang and Puri Beta residence would be more comfortable accessing Corridor 13.

=== Further developments ===
On 10 November 2017, about three months after the inauguration of the corridor, Kebayoran Lama and Seskoal BRT stations were opened to the public. This was later followed by four other stations in 2018; namely Swadarma and JORR on 1 March, and Rawa Barat and Velbak on 7 July.

On 9–10 April 2018, a trial was conducted to extend the operational time for Corridor 13 and all of its cross-corridor routes until 22.00. Due to the incomplete lighting installation along the elevated route, buses that pass through it at night received lighting assistance from a car guiding in front of them. On 11 April 2018, Corridor 13 officially operates until 22.00.

On 12 November 2018, the CBD Ciledug BRT station was officially opened. The extension to CBD Ciledug was slated to enhance the connectivity of public transport in the Greater Jakarta area.

From November 2018 until December 2021, CSW was the only station that was not operating since the opening of Corridor 13, due to of its unfriendly access. In 2020, the Jakarta provincial government started the construction of an interchange building and circular skybridge that connects the CSW BRT station itself with the ASEAN MRT station. The CSW integrated building was opened 22 December 2021, which included new stations for Corridor 1 built at-grade but part of the integrated building named ASEAN and Kejaksaan Agung stations, plus a new integrated bus stop for non-BRT routes named CSW 2. In response, route 13A (Ciledug – Blok M) was deactivated and now passengers are advised to transfer to or from Corridor 1 at the CSW-ASEAN TOD.

In March 2022, the construction of a pedestrian skywalk in Kebayoran Lama was carried out to connect Corridor 13 at the Velbak BRT station as a transit point to Corridor 8 at the Pasar Kebayoran Lama (now Kebayoran) BRT station, as well as to integrate with Kebayoran railway station which serves the Rangkasbitung Line. As a follow-up to the construction of the Kebayoran Lama skywalk, the Velbak BRT station was closed on 29 August 2022 and passengers were diverted to use Kebayoran Lama and Mayestik BRT stations during the closure until it was reopened on 24 December 2022. The Kebayoran Lama skywalk underwent a public trial on 21–24 January 2023, and was inaugurated by the Acting Governor of Jakarta, Heru Budi Hartono on 27 January.

==== 24-hour service ====
In September 2017, a month after the inauguration, some passengers requested Transjakarta to operate Corridor 13 round-the-clock; despite that the lightings along the elevated track were not fully installed yet, so buses can only operate until 17:00 at the time.

On 12 September 2022, Corridor 13 began to operate 24 hours a day, with 14 stations — excluding CBD Ciledug — served by night buses called Angkutan Malam Hari (AMARI, lit. 'Night Transport'), between 22:00 - 05:00. CBD Ciledug is the only station in the entire Transjakarta BRT system that still operates only during regular daytime hours, namely from 05:00 to 22:00, as the AMARI service terminates at Puri Beta 2.

==== Temporary readjustment ====
On 13 July 2024, Corridor 13 was shortened to Puri Beta 2 station, due to the construction of Sasak Rembaga Flyover on HOS Tjokroaminoto street. CBD Ciledug station was closed during the construction for nearly a year. On 5 June 2025, Governor of Jakarta Pramono Anung reinaugurates corridor 13's extension to CBD Ciledung, alongside the opening of a new cross-border (Transjabodetabek) feeder route from Blok M to Bogor. However, the reopening of CBD Ciledug was postponed for nine days due to minor refurbishments before resuming operational. On 14 June, CBD Ciledug BRT station was officially reopened and corridor 13 returned to terminate there (except its night time counterpart). Since then, Puri Beta 2 only serves corridor 13's night time counterpart and the three cross-corridor routes to prevent overcrowding, thus Puri Beta 2 doesn't serve the regular daytime counterpart of corridor 13 from 05:00 to 22:00.

== List of BRT stations ==
- Due the construction works of the Pelawad 2 Larangan Bridge, Puri Beta 1 BRT station is temporarily out of service since 3 August 2025.
- Currently, all stations (except CBD Ciledug) are served by buses 24 hours a day. Night time AMARI services terminate at Puri Beta 2.
- Stations indicated by a ← sign has a one way service towards CBD Ciledug (daytime) or Puri Beta 2 (nighttime) only. Stations indicated by a → sign has a one way service towards Tegal Mampang only.

Corridor 13 (CBD Ciledug – Tegal Mampang or Puri Beta 2 – Tegal Mampang)
Code	Station name	Transfer/Notes	Bus terminal and train station nearby
Stations in order: From top to bottom (downwards) towards Tegal Mampang (→); from bottom to top (upwards) towards CBD Ciledug or Puri Beta 2 (←)
13 15	CBD Ciledug	No Corridor 13 service during AMARI hours (22:00–05:00) Terminus during daytime hours	K3 Ciledug
13 13	Puri Beta 2	No Corridor 13 service during regular daytime hours (05:00–22:00) Terminus during AMARI hours	
13 13	Puri Beta 2	Puri Beta 2	
13 14	Puri Beta 1 →	Puri Beta 1	
Daytime (05:00 to 22:00): Towards CBD Ciledug (←) heads straight to CBD Ciledug
Nighttime (AMARI, 22:00 to 05:00): Towards Puri Beta 2 (←) heads straight to Puri Beta 2
13 12	Petukangan D'MASIV	Petukangan D'MASIV	
13 11	JORR	JORR	
13 10	Swadarma ParagonCorp	Swadarma ParagonCorp	
13 09	Cipulir	Cipulir	
13 08	Seskoal	Seskoal	
13 07	Kebayoran Lama	Kebayoran Lama	
13 06	Velbak	Velbak Kebayoran (via skybridge)	Kebayoran (via skybridge)
13 05	Mayestik	Mayestik	
13 04	CSW 1	CSW 1 Kejaksaan Agung (via skybridge) ASEAN (via skybridge)	ASEAN
13 03	Pasar Santa	Pasar Santa	
13 02	Rawa Barat	Rawa Barat	
13 01	Tegal Mampang	Tegal Mampang	Tegal Parang (transfer outside paid area)

== Cross-corridor routes ==
=== Route 13B (Puri Beta 2 – Pancoran) ===
- Due the construction works of the Pelawad 2 Larangan Bridge, Puri Beta 1 BRT station is temporarily out of service since 3 August 2025.
- Stations indicated by a ← sign have a one-way service towards Puri Beta 2 only. Stations indicated by a → sign have a one-way service towards Pancoran only.

Route 13B (Puri Beta 2 – Pancoran)
Code	Station name	Transfer/Notes	Bus terminal and train station nearby
Stations in order: From top to bottom (downwards) towards Pancoran (→); from bottom to top (upwards) towards Puri Beta 2 (←)
13 13	Puri Beta 2	Puri Beta 2	
13 14	~~Puri Beta 1 →~~	~~Puri Beta 1~~	
Towards Puri Beta 2 (←) heads straight to Puri Beta 2
13 12	Petukangan D'MASIV	Petukangan D'MASIV	
13 11	JORR	JORR	
13 10	Swadarma ParagonCorp	Swadarma ParagonCorp	
13 09	Cipulir	Cipulir	
13 08	Seskoal	Seskoal	
13 07	Kebayoran Lama	Kebayoran Lama	
13 06	Velbak	Velbak Kebayoran (via skybridge)	Kebayoran (via skybridge)
13 05	Mayestik	Mayestik	
13 04	CSW 1	CSW 1 Kejaksaan Agung (via skybridge) ASEAN (via skybridge)	ASEAN
13 03	Pasar Santa	Pasar Santa	
13 02	Rawa Barat	Rawa Barat	
Towards Pancoran (→) heads straight to Pancoran
13 01	Tegal Mampang ←	Tegal Mampang	Tegal Parang (transfer outside paid area)
9 09	Pancoran	Two separate buildings for opposing directions require exiting paid area to transfer: Eastbound: Arrivals only; Westbound: Towards Puri Beta 2 (←)	Pancoran Bank BJB
9 09	Pancoran	Pancoran	Pancoran Bank BJB

=== Route 13E (Puri Beta 2 – Flyover Kuningan) ===
- Due the construction works of the Pelawad 2 Larangan Bridge, Puri Beta 1 BRT station is temporarily out of service since 3 August 2025.
- Stations indicated by a ← have a one-way service towards Puri Beta 2 only. Stations indicated by a → sign have a one-way service towards Flyover Kuningan only.
- This service only runs on Saturdays, Sundays, and public holidays.

Route 13E (Puri Beta 2 – Flyover Kuningan)
Code	Station name	Transfer/Notes	Bus terminal and train station nearby
Stations in order: From top to bottom (downwards) towards Flyover Kuningan (→); from bottom to top (upwards) towards Puri Beta 2 (←)
13 13	Puri Beta 2	Puri Beta 2	
13 14	~~Puri Beta 1 →~~	~~Puri Beta 1~~	
Towards Puri Beta 2 (←) heads straight to Puri Beta 2
13 12	Petukangan D'MASIV	Petukangan D'MASIV	
13 11	JORR	JORR	
13 10	Swadarma ParagonCorp	Swadarma ParagonCorp	
13 09	Cipulir	Cipulir	
13 08	Seskoal	Seskoal	
13 07	Kebayoran Lama	Kebayoran Lama	
13 06	Velbak	Velbak Kebayoran (via skybridge)	Kebayoran (via skybridge)
13 05	Mayestik	Mayestik	
13 04	CSW 1	CSW 1 Kejaksaan Agung (via skybridge) ASEAN (via skybridge)	ASEAN
13 03	Pasar Santa	Pasar Santa	
13 02	Rawa Barat	Rawa Barat	
9 11	Simpang Kuningan →	Simpang Kuningan Underpass Kuningan (via skybridge)	
Towards Flyover Kuningan (→) heads straight to Patra Kuningan
Towards Puri Beta 2 (←) heads straight to CSW 1
13 01	Tegal Mampang ←	Tegal Mampang	Tegal Parang (transfer outside paid area)
6 11	Underpass Kuningan ←	Underpass Kuningan Simpang Kuningan (via skybridge)	
6 12	Patra Kuningan	Patra Kuningan	
6 13	Kuningan	Kuningan	Kuningan
6 14	Rasuna Said	Rasuna Said	Rasuna Said
6 15	Karet Kuningan	Karet Kuningan	
6 16	Kuningan Madya	Kuningan Madya	
6 17	Setiabudi Integritas	Setiabudi Integritas	Setiabudi
6 18	Flyover Kuningan	Flyover Kuningan	

=== Route L13E (Puri Beta 2 – Flyover Kuningan) ===
- Due the construction works of the Pelawad 2 Larangan Bridge, Puri Beta 1 BRT station is temporarily out of service since 3 August 2025.
- Stations indicated by a ← have a one-way service towards Puri Beta 2 only. Stations indicated by a → sign have a one-way service towards Flyover Kuningan only.
- This service only runs on weekdays.

Route L13E (Puri Beta 2 – Flyover Kuningan)
Code	Station name	Transfer/Notes	Bus terminal and train station nearby
Stations in order: From top to bottom (downwards) towards Flyover Kuningan (→); from bottom to top (upwards) towards Puri Beta 2 (←)
13 13	Puri Beta 2	Puri Beta 2	
13 14	~~Puri Beta 1 →~~	~~Puri Beta 1~~	
Towards Puri Beta 2 (←) heads straight to Puri Beta 2
13 12	Petukangan D'MASIV	Petukangan D'MASIV	
13 06	Velbak	Velbak Kebayoran (via skybridge)	Kebayoran (via skybridge)
13 04	CSW 1	CSW 1 Kejaksaan Agung (via skybridge) ASEAN (via skybridge)	ASEAN
9 11	Simpang Kuningan →	Simpang Kuningan Underpass Kuningan (via skybridge)	
Towards Flyover Kuningan (→) heads straight to Patra Kuningan
Towards Puri Beta 2 (←) heads straight to CSW 1
13 01	Tegal Mampang ←	Tegal Mampang	Tegal Parang (transfer outside paid area)
6 11	Underpass Kuningan ←	Underpass Kuningan Simpang Kuningan (via skybridge)	
6 12	Patra Kuningan	Patra Kuningan	
6 13	Kuningan	Kuningan	Kuningan
6 14	Rasuna Said	Rasuna Said	Rasuna Said
6 15	Karet Kuningan	Karet Kuningan	
6 16	Kuningan Madya	Kuningan Madya	
6 17	Setiabudi Integritas	Setiabudi Integritas	Setiabudi
6 18	Flyover Kuningan	Flyover Kuningan	

== Special route ==
=== Route 13D (Puri Beta 2 – Ragunan) ===
- Only operates during holiday seasons, such as Eid al-Fitr and Christmas holidays. The most recent operational was conducted from 11 to 15 April 2024.
- Station indicated by a → sign has a one way service towards Ragunan only.

Route 13D (Puri Beta 2 – Ragunan)
Code	Station name	Transfer/Notes	Bus terminal and train station nearby
Stations in order: From top to bottom (downwards) towards Ragunan (→); from bottom to top (upwards) towards Puri Beta 2 (←)
13 13	Puri Beta 2	Puri Beta 2	
13 14	Puri Beta 1 →	Puri Beta 1	
Towards Puri Beta 2 (←) heads straight to Puri Beta 2
13 12	Petukangan D'MASIV	Petukangan D'MASIV	
13 11	JORR	JORR	
13 10	Swadarma ParagonCorp	Swadarma ParagonCorp	
13 09	Cipulir	Cipulir	
13 08	Seskoal	Seskoal	
13 07	Kebayoran Lama	Kebayoran Lama	
13 06	Velbak	Velbak Kebayoran (via skybridge)	Kebayoran (via skybridge)
13 05	Mayestik	Mayestik	
13 04	CSW 1	CSW 1 Kejaksaan Agung (via skybridge) ASEAN (via skybridge)	ASEAN
13 03	Pasar Santa	Pasar Santa	
13 02	Rawa Barat	Rawa Barat	
13 01	Tegal Mampang	Tegal Mampang	Tegal Parang (transfer outside paid area)
6 10	Mampang Prapatan	Mampang Prapatan	
6 09	Duren Tiga	Duren Tiga	
6 08	Warung Buncit	Warung Buncit	
6 07	Warung Jati	Warung Jati	
6 06	Buncit Indah	Buncit Indah	
6 05	Pejaten	Pejaten	
6 04	Jati Padang	Jati Padang	
6 03	Jati Barat	Jati Barat	
6 02	Simpang Ragunan Ar-Raudhah	Simpang Ragunan Ar-Raudhah	Warung Jati (planned)
6 01	Ragunan	Ragunan	Ragunan Bus Terminal

== Fleets ==
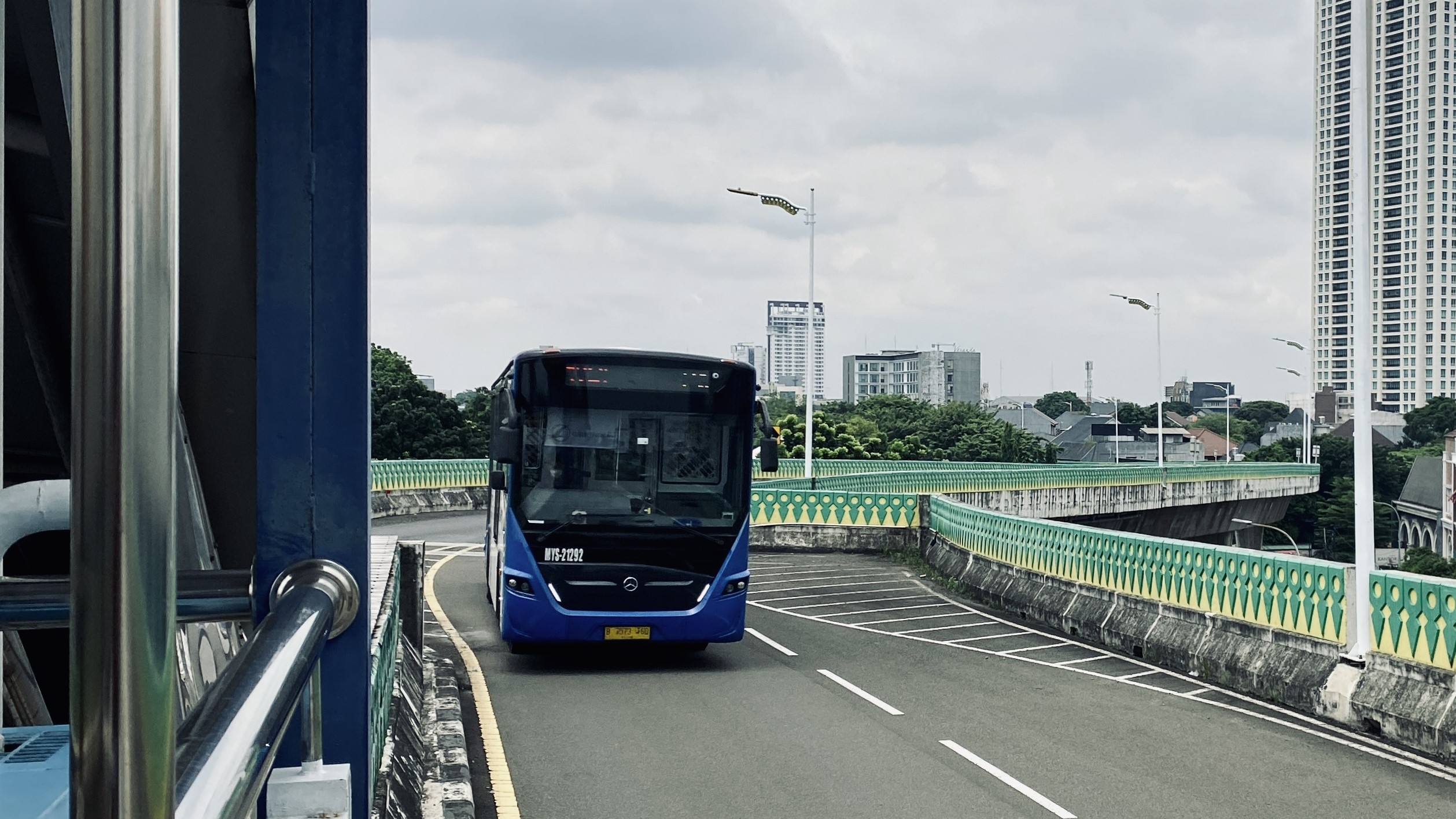
The Mercedes-Benz bus fleet that serves Corridor 13, approaching the Mayestik BRT station.

Information correct as of December 2024

- Mayasari Bakti (MB/MYS):
  - Scania K310IB 6×2, white-blue (MYS)
- Bianglala Metropolitan (BMP):
  - Mercedes-Benz OH 1626, white- blue (night bus, Puri Beta 2–Tegal Mampang (22:00-05-00))

== Depots ==
- Mayasari Bakti (MB/MYS):
  - Klender
- Bianglala Metropolitan (BMP):
  - Ciputat (night bus)

== Incident ==
On 23 February 2026, two Transjakarta bus fleets – each operated by Bianglala Metropolitan (BMP) and Mayasari Bakti (MYS) – collided at the section between Swadarma ParagonCorp and Cipulir BRT stations, with 23 passengers injured and immediately evacuated. Police reports revealed that the incident occurred because the BMP bus driver went into a state of microsleep.

== See also ==
- Transjakarta
  - List of Transjakarta corridors
- CSW-ASEAN TOD
- BRT Sunway Line – A similar elevated BRT corridor in Malaysia.
