= Setiabudi LRT station =

Light rapid transit station in South Jakarta, Indonesia

CB02 BK02 Setiabudi
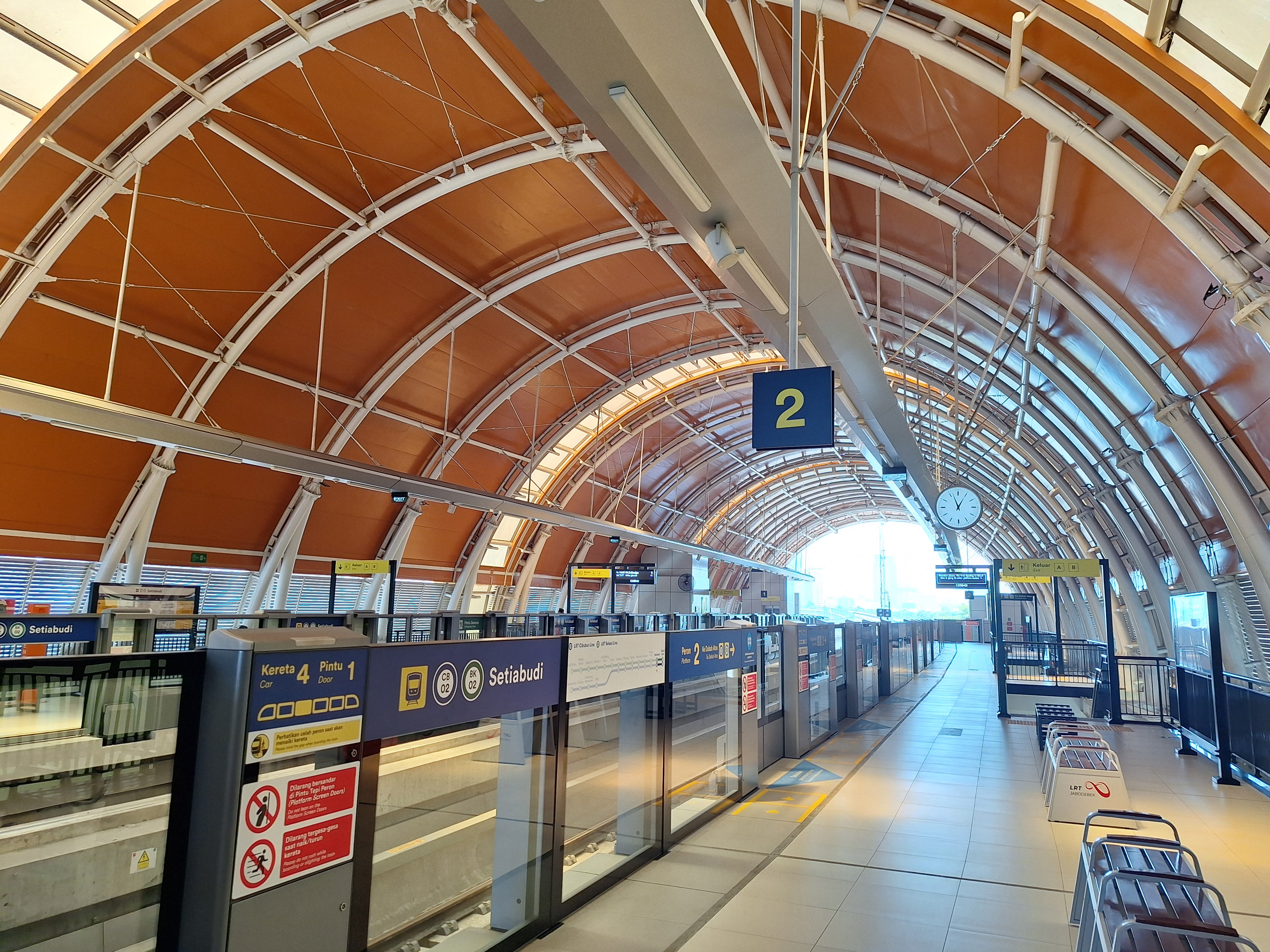
- Platform 2 of Setiabudi LRT Station in December 2023

General information
- Location: Jalan H.R. Rasuna Said, Guntur, Setiabudi, South Jakarta, Jakarta, Indonesia
- Coordinates: 6.209277°S 106.830211°E
- System: Jabodebek LRT station
- Owner: Ministry of Transportation via the Directorate General of Railways
- Manager: Kereta Api Indonesia
- Lines: Cibubur Line; Bekasi Line
- Platforms: 2 side platforms
- Tracks: 2
- Connections: Setiabudi Integritas

Construction
- Structure type: Elevated
- Cycle facilities: Bicycle parking
- Accessible: Yes

Other information
- Station code: SET

History
- Opened: 28 August 2023
- Electrified: 2019

Services
Preceding station		Following station
Dukuh Atas Bank Syariah Indonesia towards Dukuh Atas BNI	Cibubur Line	Rasuna Said towards Harjamukti
Dukuh Atas Bank Syariah Indonesia towards Dukuh Atas BNI	Bekasi Line	Rasuna Said towards Jati Mulya
Route map
Location

Setiabudi LRT Station is a light rapid transit station located on H.R. Rasuna Said avenue, Guntur, Setiabudi, South Jakarta, Indonesia. Located at an altitude of +22.55 meters, it serves the Cibubur and Bekasi lines of the Jabodebek LRT system. Despite sharing the same name, it is not an interchange and is not to be confused with the Jakarta MRT station of the same name, and they are in fact located 600 meters apart from each other and not on the same road.

== Station layout ==
2nd floor	Side platform, the doors are opened on the right side
2nd floor	Line 1	← (Rasuna Said)	Cibubur Line to Harjamukti, Bekasi Line to Jati Mulya
2nd floor	Line 2		Cibubur Line to Dukuh Atas Bank Syariah Indonesia, Bekasi Line to Dukuh Atas Bank Syariah Indonesia	(Dukuh Atas Bank Syariah Indonesia) →
2nd floor	Side platform, the doors are opened on the right side
1st floor	Concourse	Ticket counter, ticket vending machines, fare gates, and retail kiosks.
Ground level	Street	Entrance/Exit and access to Setiabudi BRT Station

== Services ==
- Cibubur Line
- Bekasi Line

== Supporting transportation ==
Type	Station	Route	Destination
Transjakarta	Setiabudi Integritas	List of Transjakarta corridors#Cross-corridor routes	Pulo Gadung–Patra Kuningan
Transjakarta	Setiabudi Integritas	List of TransJakarta corridors#Corridor 6	Ragunan–Galunggung
Transjakarta	Setiabudi Integritas	List of TransJakarta corridors#Cross-corridor routes	Ragunan–Balai Kota via Kuningan
Transjakarta	Setiabudi Integritas	List of TransJakarta corridors#Cross-corridor routes	Puri Beta 2–Flyover Kuningan (Weekend all-station)
Transjakarta	Setiabudi Integritas	List of TransJakarta corridors#Cross-corridor routes	Puri Beta 2–Flyover Kuningan (Weekday express)
Transjakarta (Non-BRT)	Setiabudi Integritas		Lebak Bulus–Senen Bus Terminal
Transjakarta (Non-BRT)	Setiabudi Integritas		Manggarai railway station – Blok M Bus Terminal
Transjakarta Royaltrans	Kuningan Media and Menara Duta (Bus stops)		Setiabudi LRT station–Cibubur Junction
Transjakarta Royaltrans	Kuningan Media and Menara Duta (Bus stops)		Setiabudi LRT station–Summarecon Mall Bekasi
Transjakarta Royaltrans	Kuningan Media and Menara Duta (Bus stops)		Setiabudi LRT station–South City Cinere

== Gallery ==
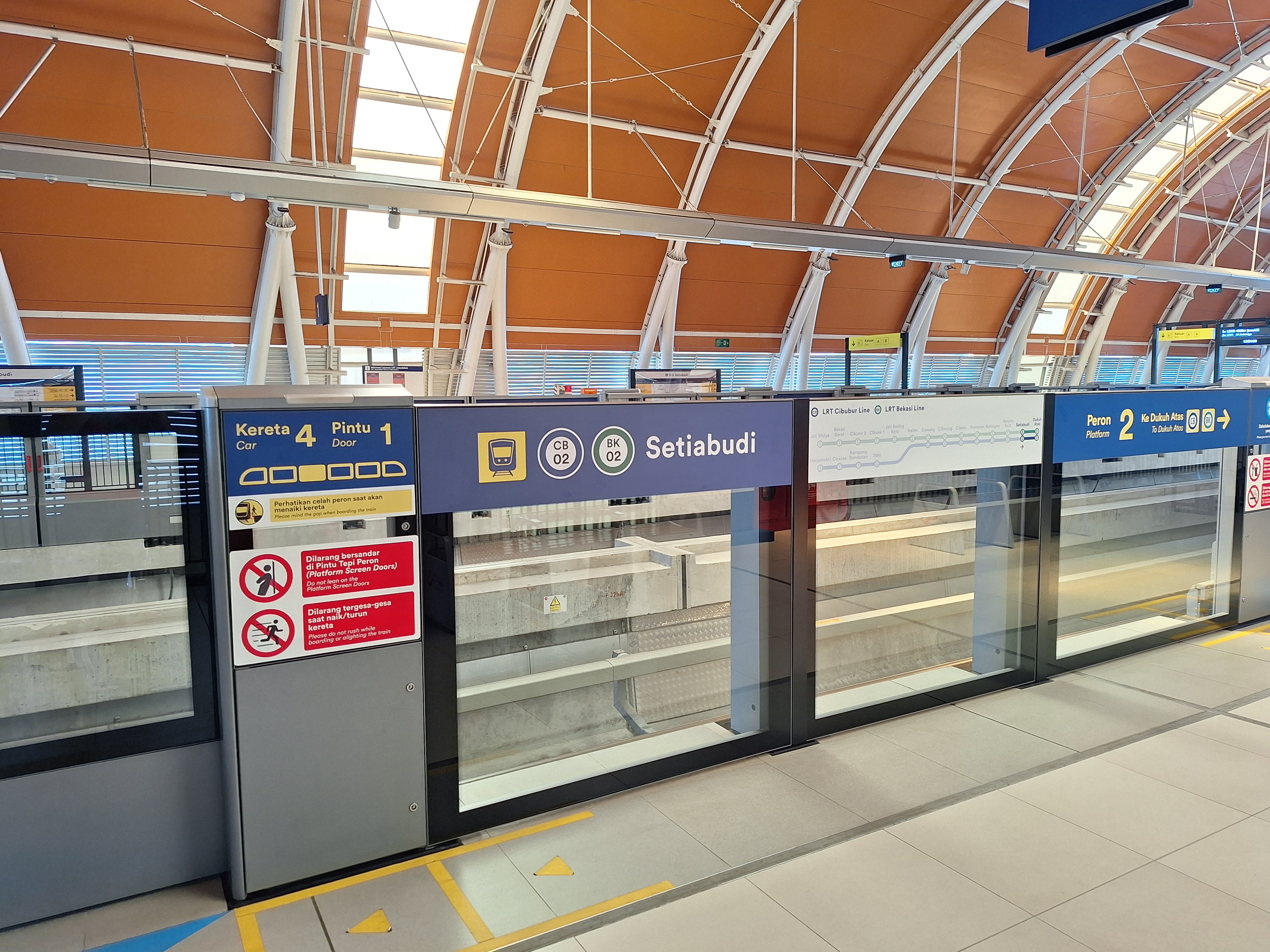
Setiabudi LRT Station name in December 2023
