= CBD Ciledug (Transjakarta) =

Bus rapid transit station in Tangerang, Indonesia

13 15 CBD Ciledug
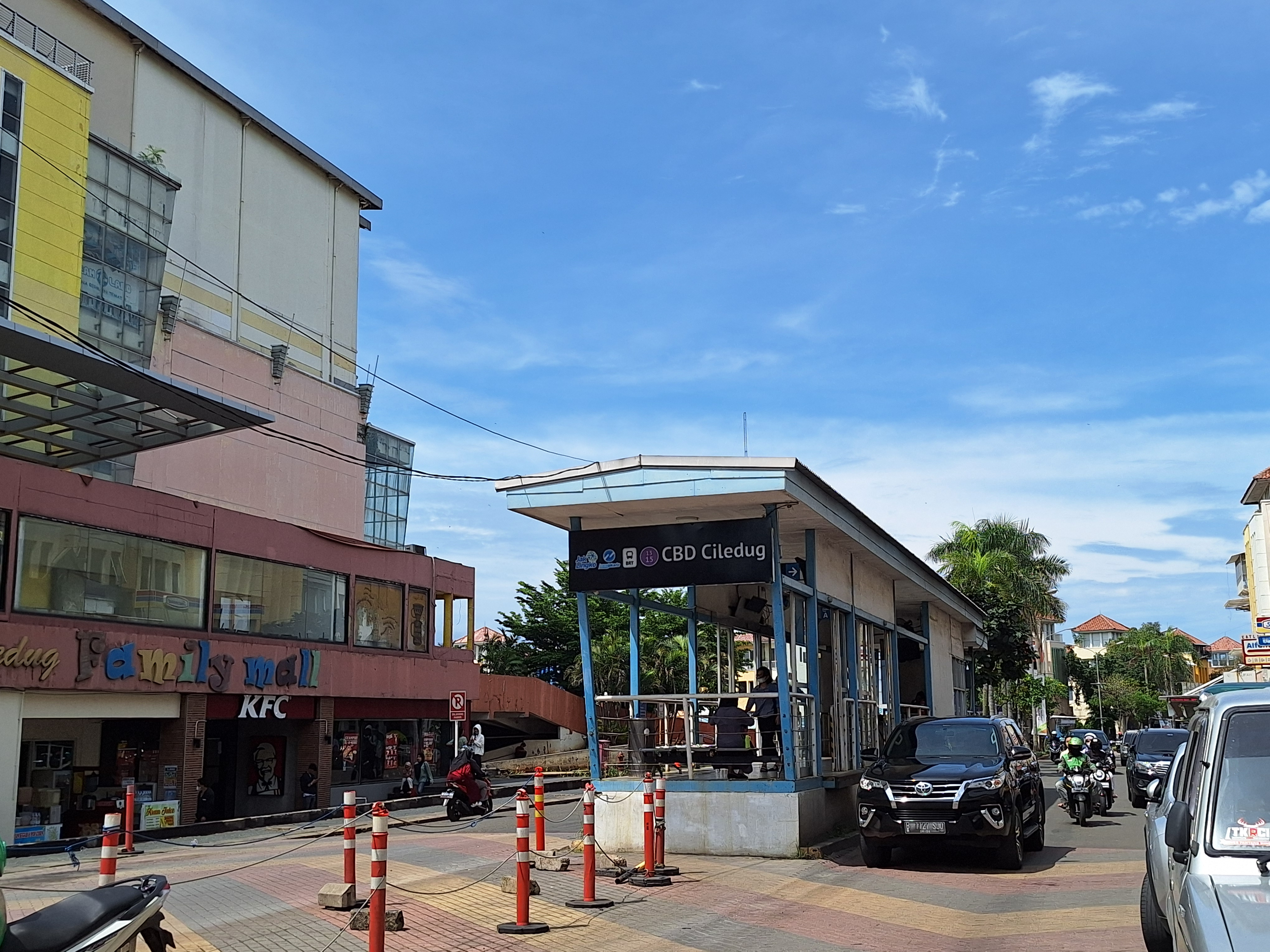

General information
- Other names: Ciledug
- Location: HOS Tjokroaminoto Street, Karangtengah, Karangtengah, Tangerang 15157, Indonesia
- System: Transjakarta bus rapid transit station
- Owner: Transjakarta
- Operator: Transjakarta
- Lines: List of TransJakarta corridors#Corridor 13
- Platforms: Single island platform

Construction
- Structure type: At-grade
- Cycle facilities: No

Other information
- Status: In service

History
- Opened: 12 November 2018

Services
Preceding		Following
Petukangan d'Masiv One-way operation	Corridor 13 Terminus; 05:00-22:00	Puri Beta 1 towards Tegal Mampang
Location

CBD Ciledug is a Transjakarta bus rapid transit station located on HOS Tjokroaminoto Street, Karangtengah, Tangerang, Banten, Indonesia It is the western terminus of Corridor 13 and is one of the five stations in the line that are built at-grade. The acronym CBD stands for Central Business District, as although the area is not part of downtown Tangerang, there are multiple office buildings and a mall surrounding the station.

This is the only station on the network that does not operate 24 hours a day and still closes at 22:00. AMARI Corridor 13 services terminate at Puri Beta 2 station.

== History ==
When Corridor 13 started operations in 2017, the western terminus of the line was Puri Beta 2. To relieve the congestion in the Ciledug area, the station was constructed 2.8 km away from the Puri Beta housing complex where Puri Beta 2 is located, later to provide direct BRT access to residents of Cipondoh, Karangtengah, Serpong Utara (North Serpong), and Bintaro. The extension was applauded for reducing the volume of private vehicles on the road by 50%. However, only the main Corridor 13 terminates here, while all other cross-corridor services terminate at Puri Beta 2. On 12 November 2018 CBD Ciledug BRT station was inaugurated and the main Corridor 13 began to terminate here.

On 13 July 2024, CBD Ciledug was temporarily closed for eleven months due to the construction of the Sasak Rembaga Bridge. On 5 June 2025, the station was reopened remotely from the Blok M Bus Terminal by the Governor of Jakarta, Pramono Anung, alongside the opening of a feeder route from Blok M to Bogor. However, in practice, the reopening of CBD Ciledug was delayed for minor refurbishment works. The station was eventually reopened on 14 June 2025.

== Building and layout ==
The station lies on the median of HOS Tjokroaminoto Street. The station is accessible through a pelican crossing.

West	Arrivals
Island platform, doors open on the right
East	← (Puri Beta 1)	towards Tegal Mampang

== Non-BRT bus services ==
Type	Route	Destination	Notes
Trans Tangerang Ayo	K3	CBD Ciledug—Tangcity Mall	Outside the station

== Places nearby ==
- CBD Ciledug Family Mall
- Plaza Saraswati

== Gallery ==
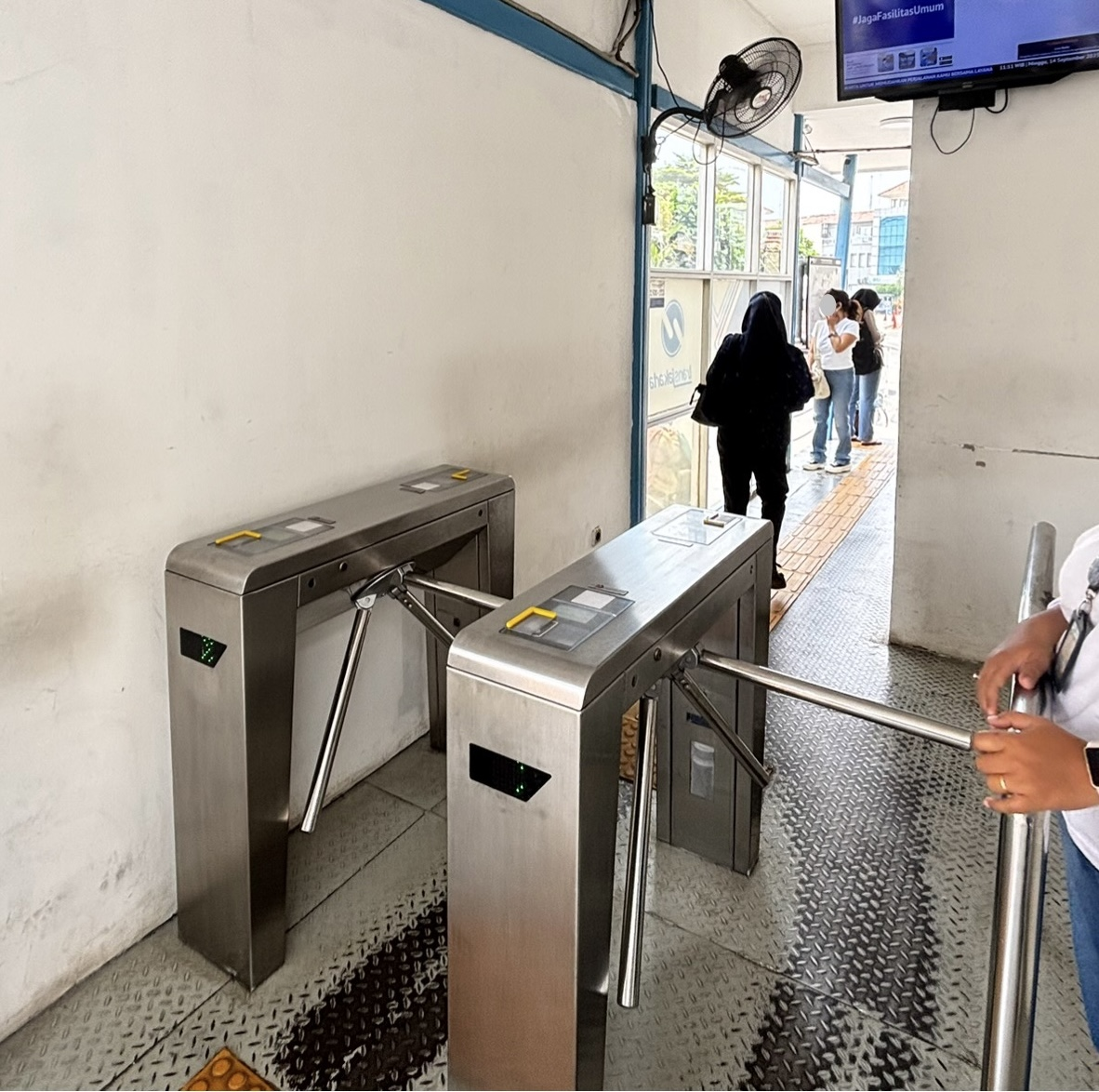
Entrance turnstiles

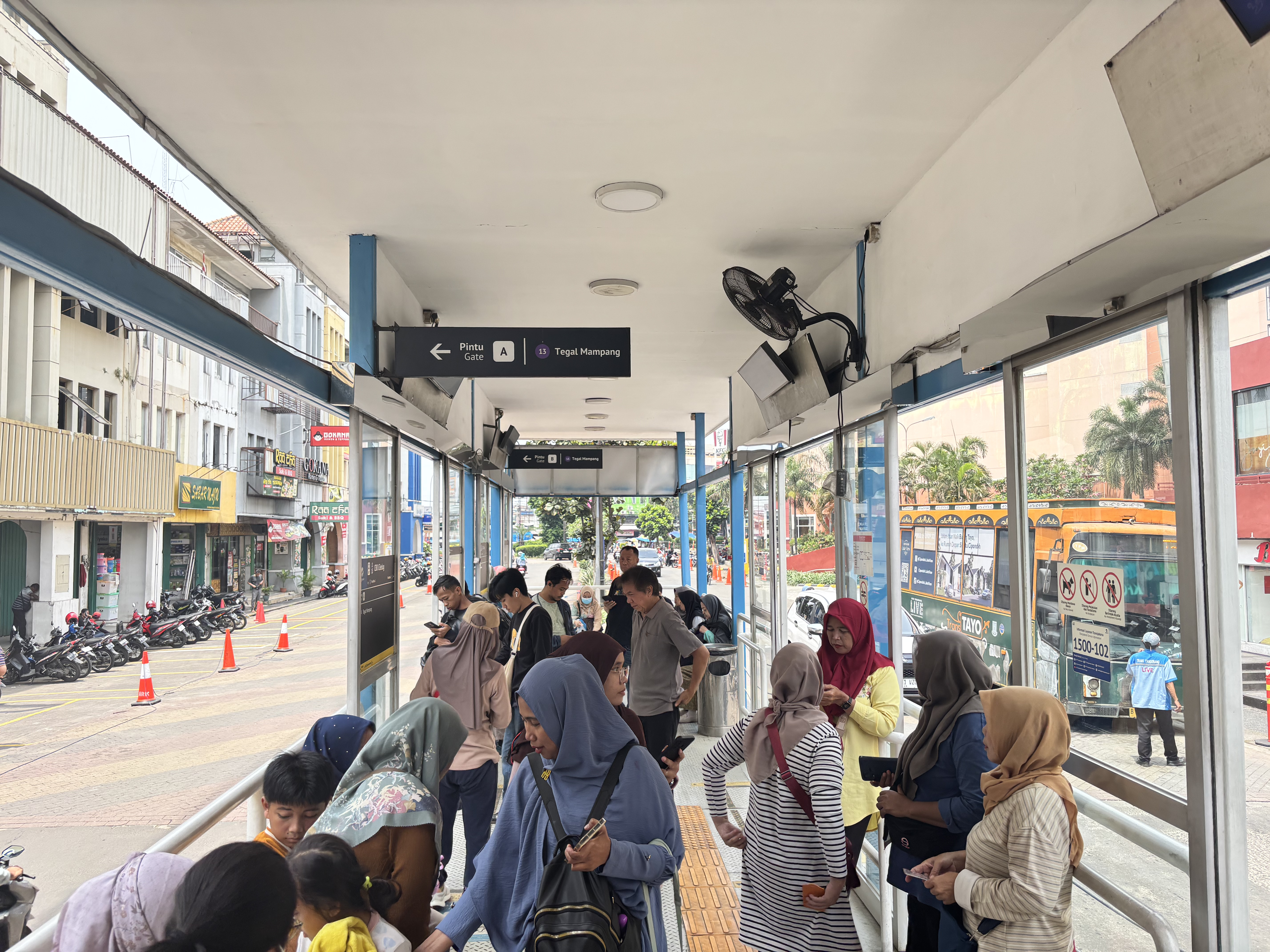
Inner view
