= Ciledug =

- District
- Interactive map of Ciledug
- Country: Indonesia
- Province: Banten
- Municipality: Tangerang City

Government
  - Camat: Muhammad Marwan

Area
  - Total: 8.77 km^{2} (3.39 sq mi)

Population (mid 2023 estimate)
  - Total: 150,190
  - Density: 17,100/km^{2} (44,400/sq mi)

Ciledug is an administrative district (kecamatan) of Tangerang City, in Banten Province of Indonesia, on the island of Java (not to be confused with the district of the same name in Cirebon Regency). The district covers an area of 8.77 km^{2}, and had a population of 147,023 at the 2010 Census and 164,151 at the 2020 Census; the official estimate as at mid 2023 was 150,190.

Ciledug has a shopping mall named CBD Ciledug.

== Communities ==
Ciledug District is sub-divided into eight urban communities (kelurahan), listed below with their areas and their officially-estimated populations as at mid 2022, together with their postcodes.

Kode Wilayah	Name of kelurahan	Area in km^{2}	Population mid 2022 estimate	Post code
36.71.06.1001	Paninggilan	1.08	20,665	15153
36.71.06.1002	Sudimara Barat	0.97	19,484	15151
36.71.06.1003	Sudimara Timur	1.12	12,659	15151
36.71.06.1004	Tajur	1.34	18,465	15152
36.71.06.1005	Parung Serab	1.18	18,241	15153
36.71.06.1006	Sudimara Jaya	0.79	22,475	15151
36.71.06.1007	Sudimara Selatan	1.10	17,128	15151
36.71.06.1008	Paninggilan Utara	1.18	18,776	15153
36.71.06	Totals	8.77	147,893 ^{(a)}	

Notes: (a) comprising 73,941 males and 73,952 females.

== Transport ==
=== City Bus Transjakarta ===
- Corridor 13 Ciledug - Tegal Mampang
- Corridor 13B Puri Beta - Pancoran

=== City Bus Trans Kota Tangerang ===
- Trans Kota Tangerang CBD Ciledug - Tangcity Mall Via Jl KH Hasyim Ashari

=== City Bus In Trans Graha Raya ===
- Bus 6 Pasar Modern Graha Raya (Graha Autopart Station) - Puri Beta

==== Jakarta MRT ====
In the future, Ciledug will be connected to the Jakarta MRT East-West Line and North-South Extension. The East West Line will connect Cikarang in the east and Balaraja in the west.

The North South Extension will connect Lebak Bulus in the east and Serpong (Pagedangan ICE BSD) in the west.

Ciledug will have East West Line MRT stations in Kembangan, West Jakarta, approximately 4.9 km away, and Karang Tengah, Tangerang, approximately 2.9 km away.

Furthermore, Ciledug will have a North South Line Extension MRT station in Graha Taman Bintaro, Pondok Aren, Tangsel, approximately 6.6 km away.
