= Puri Beta 2 (Transjakarta) =

Bus rapid transit station in Tangerang, Indonesia

13 13 Puri Beta 2
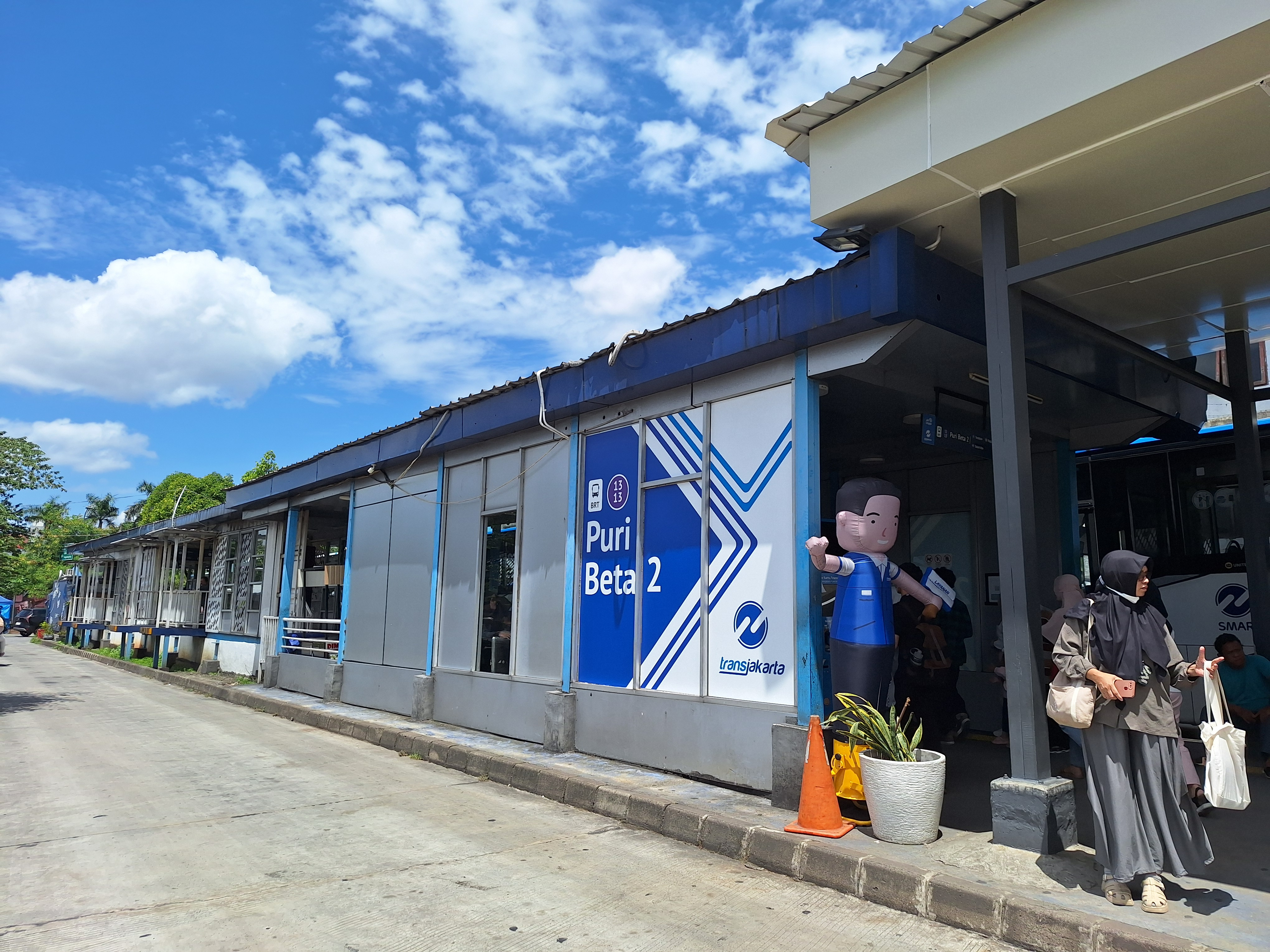

General information
- Location: Puri Beta Selatan Raya Street, Larangan Utara, Larangan, Tangerang 15154, Indonesia
- Coordinates: 6.230351°S 106.723701°E
- System: Transjakarta bus rapid transit station
- Owner: Transjakarta
- Operator: Transjakarta
- Lines: (22:00-05:00)
- Platforms: Two side platforms with separate paid area per platform

Construction
- Structure type: At-grade
- Cycle facilities: Finnish bike symbol

Other information
- Status: In service

History
- Opened: 13 August 2017

Services
| Preceding | | Following |
|---|---|---|
| Petukangan d'Masiv One-way operation | Corridor 13 Terminus; 22:00-05:00 | Puri Beta 1 towards Tegal Mampang |
| Petukangan d'Masiv One-way operation | Corridor 13 Route 13B Terminus | Puri Beta 1 towards Pancoran |
| Petukangan d'Masiv One-way operation | Corridor 13 Route 13E Terminus | Puri Beta 1 towards Flyover Kuningan |
| Petukangan d'Masiv One-way operation | Corridor 13 Route L13E Terminus | Puri Beta 1 towards Flyover Kuningan |
Location

Puri Beta 2 is a Transjakarta bus rapid transit station located on Puri Beta Selatan Raya Street, Larangan Utara, Larangan, Tangerang, Banten, Indonesia, serving Corridor 13. The station is located near Puri Beta Housing Complex. It is one of the five Corridor 13 stations built at-grade, and one of the three on the network located outside Jakarta. It is also the only station on the network that does not serve its main corridor during daytime hours.

After the mass renaming of stations on the network in 2023, this station is one of the few that still have a number in its name, alongside Puri Beta 1, CSW 1, and Gambir 2 stations. Each of the two Puri Beta stations is named after the specific housing complex it serves, which are also named Puri Beta 1 and Puri Beta 2.

== History ==
The station opened as the western terminus of Corridor 13 on 13 August 2017. At first, it only had one bus bay. Later, it was expanded; two bus bays were added, so the station had three bus bays: two facing south and one facing north. With increasing passenger use, the station was overhauled in 2018, with a new building on the northern side of the station.

On 12 November 2018, Corridor 13 was extended to terminate at CBD Ciledug station, and Puri Beta 2 became a pass-through station for westbound buses only. However, cross-corridor services of Corridor 13, notably 13B, 13E, and L13E, which are in operation today, continue to terminate here. After Corridor 13 began 24-hour operations on 12 September 2022, approaching the end of the COVID-19 pandemic, CBD Ciledug remains a daytime-only station, and Corridor 13 terminates here from 22:00 to 05:00 the next day.

From 13 July 2024 to 14 June 2025, Corridor 13 was shortened and terminated here due to Sasak Rembaga Bridge renovation works. Upon the reopening of CBD Ciledug, to prevent overcrowding, Transjakarta decided that the station would no longer serve the main Corridor 13 during daytime hours. This makes it the only station on the entire network without its main BRT corridor service during daytime hours. Passengers are required to use cross-corridor services 13B, 13E, and L13E to go to Jakarta.

== Building and layout ==
The new structure since the 2018 overhaul has four bus bays on each side. The old building is now used for arrivals only. Each of the two structures has a separate paid area, so passengers alighting from buses terminating at this station are required to tap out and pay again to transfer and proceed to the departure platform.

Bicycle parks are available at the eastern end of each structure, and car parks are available southeast of the station.

| ↱ (Puri Beta 1) | towards Flyover Kuningan |
| North | Island platform, doors open on either side |
| ↱ (Puri Beta 1) | towards Pancoran, and towards Flyover Kuningan |
| South | Side platform, doors open on the right |
| ↱ (Puri Beta 1) | Arrivals |

== Non-BRT bus services ==
| Type | Route | Destination | Notes |
|---|---|---|---|
| Mikrotrans Jak Lingko | JAK 107 | Garden Bridge—Puri Beta | Outside the station |

== Controversies ==
The station has attracted criticism for being undersized, resulting in overcrowding, a problem that Transjakarta addressed by removing the main Corridor 13 service from the station and adding a new northern platform for departures. The road surrounding the station was also in disrepair, which Transjakarta addressed in 2023 by fixing it themselves to prevent damage to their buses caused by shocks. The road surrounding the station is also severely congested due to angkots and online taxis stopping anywhere they want.

== Gallery ==
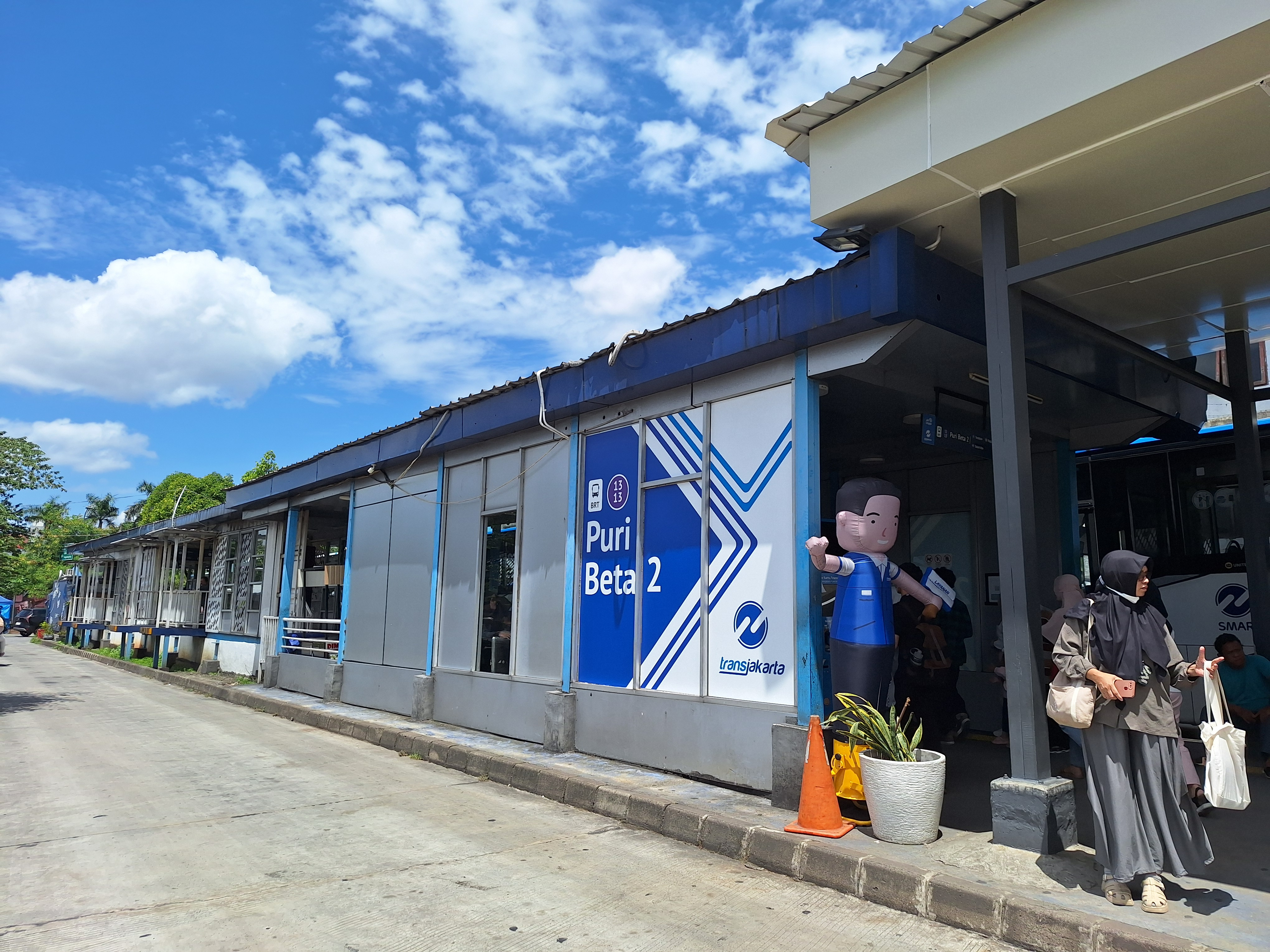
New name board, 2024.

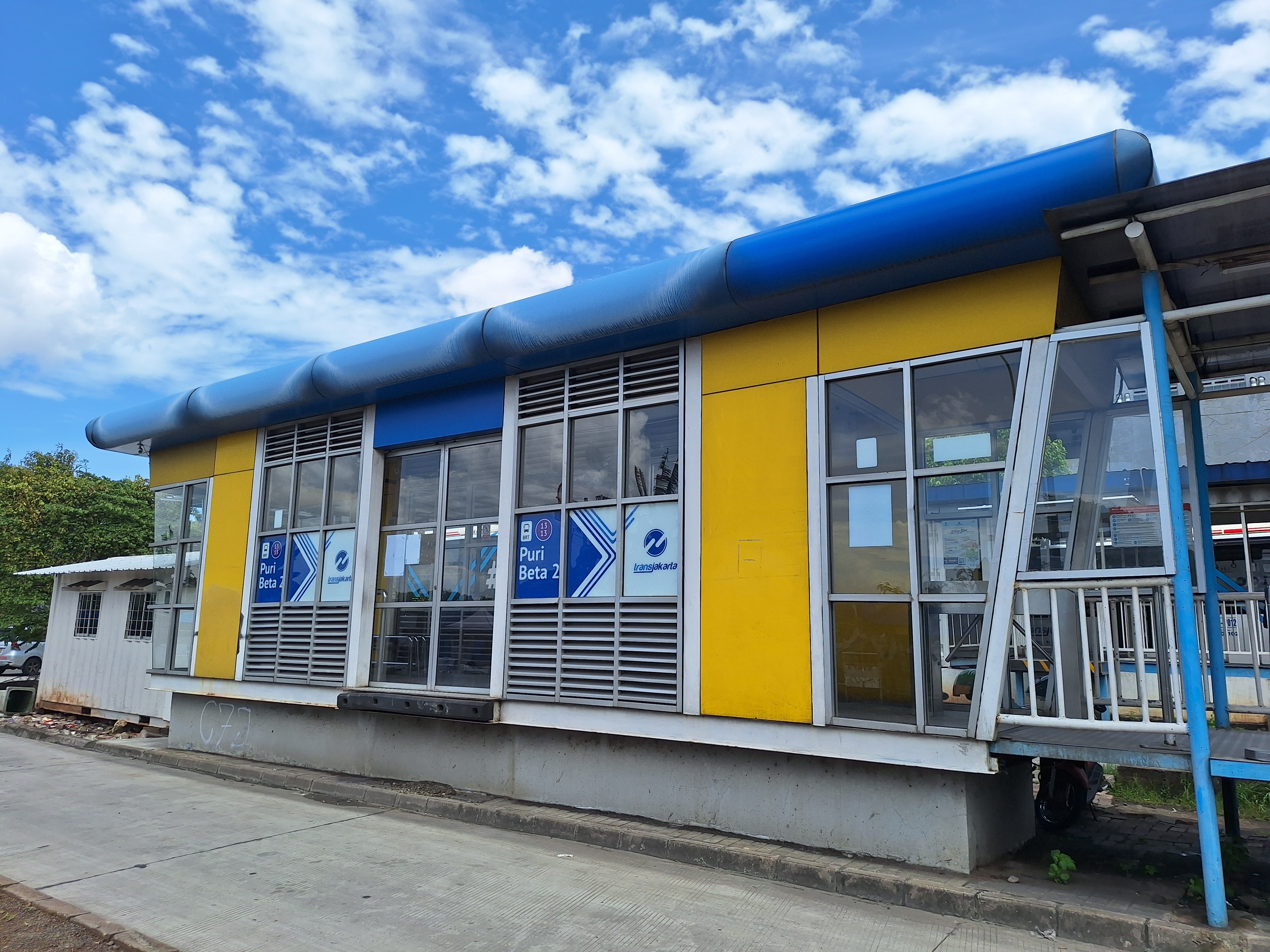
Old station building, 2024.

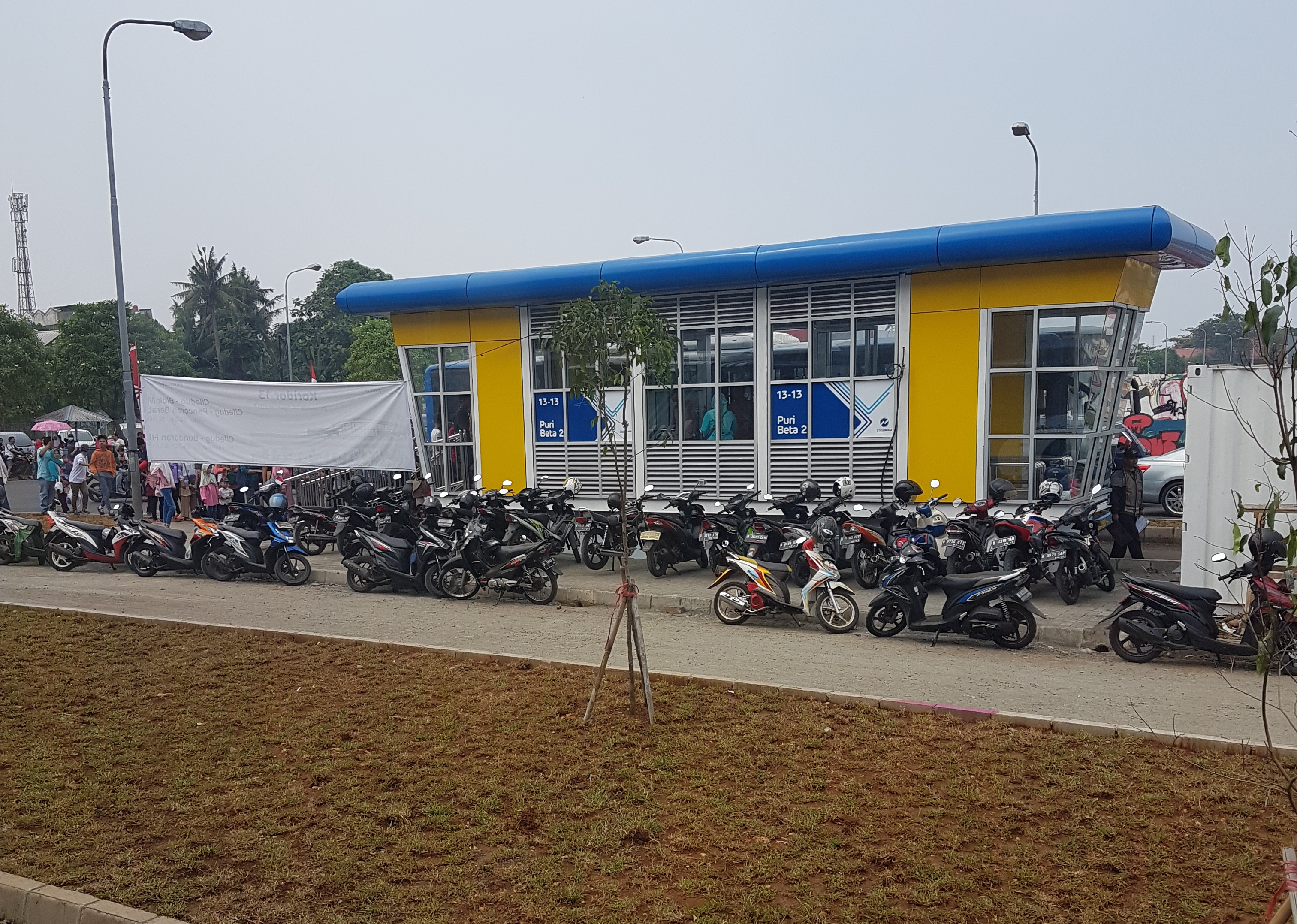
Motorcycle parks.
