= Flyover Kuningan (Transjakarta) =

Bus rapid transit station in Jakarta, Indonesia

6 18 Flyover Kuningan
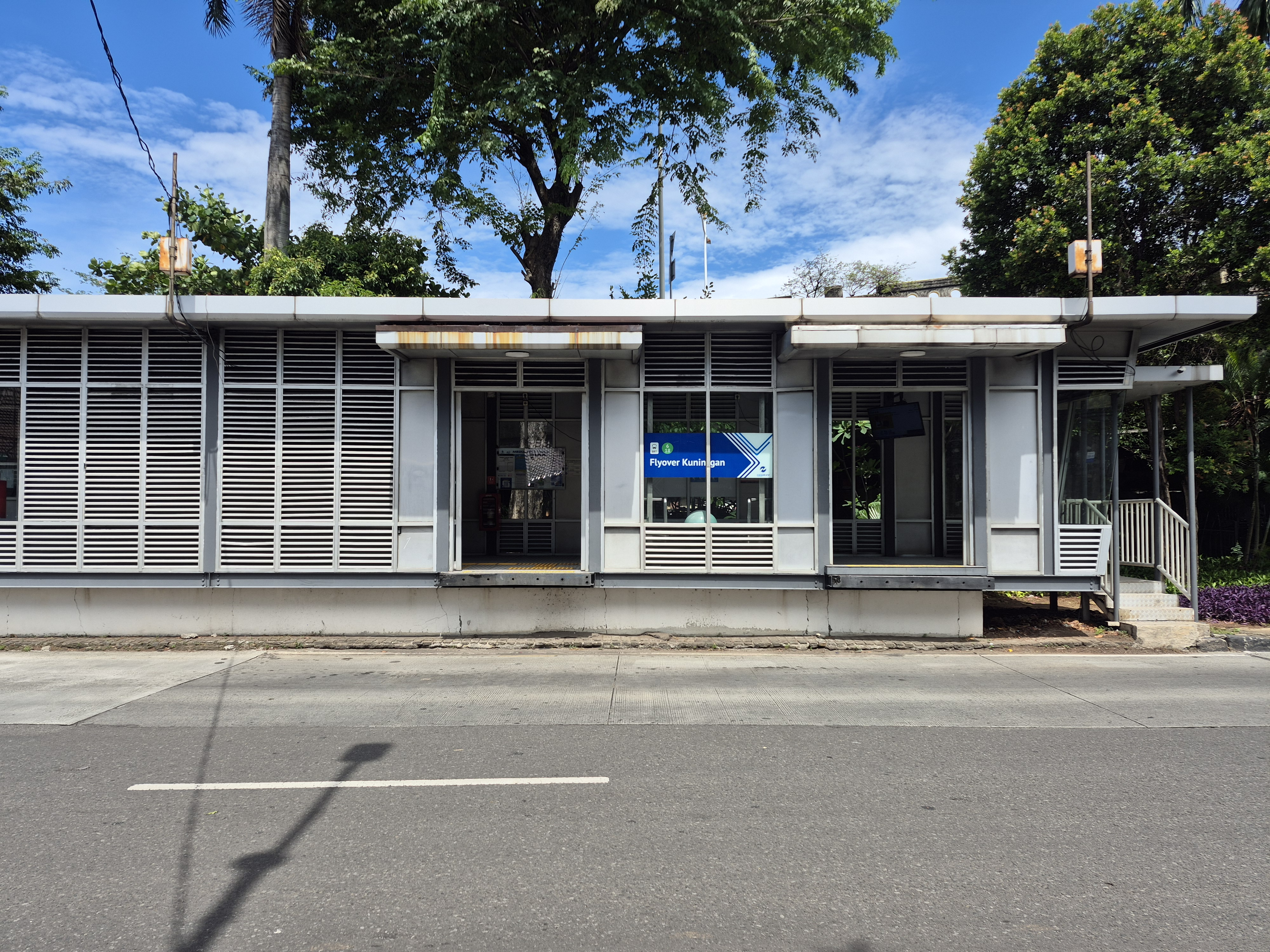
- View of the station in 2025

General information
- Location: Latuharhary Street, Menteng, Menteng, Central Jakarta 10310, Indonesia
- Coordinates: 6.20321°S 106.82776°E
- System: Transjakarta bus rapid transit station
- Owner: Transjakarta
- Operator: Transjakarta
- Lines: List of TransJakarta corridors#Corridor 6 List of TransJakarta corridors#Cross-corridor routes
- Platforms: Single side platform

Construction
- Structure type: At-grade
- Cycle facilities: No

Other information
- Status: In service

History
- Opened: 27 January 2007
- Former names: Latuharhary

Services
Preceding		Following
Setiabudi Integritas One-way operation	Corridor 6	Galunggung Terminus
Setiabudi Integritas towards Puri Beta 2	Corridor 13 Route 13E Terminus	Terminus
Setiabudi Integritas towards Puri Beta 2	Corridor 13 Route L13E Terminus	Terminus
Location

Flyover Kuningan (formerly Latuharhary) is a Transjakarta bus rapid transit station located on Latuharhary Street, Menteng, Menteng, Central Jakarta, serving Corridor 6. It is named after the flyover adjacent to it; having previously named after Johannes Latuharhary (1900–1959) (often misspelled as Latuharhari), the first Governor of Maluku from 1945 until 1955, which comes from the street where this station is located.

== Building and layout ==
The station is small and only has two gates in service. The station uniquely features a low-floor gate to allow passengers to board low-floor non-BRT buses. The low-floor platform is no longer in use. As the station has not been rebuilt, it has limited amenities for passengers.

The station technically only serves northbound Corridor 6 buses, although there is also service L13E for passengers going towards the opposite direction of Corridor 6.

East
Side platform, doors open on the left
West	towards Galunggung and towards Puri Beta 2 (Setiabudi Integritas/Galunggung) →

== Non-BRT bus services ==
Type	Route	Destination	Notes
Inner city feeder		Dukuh Atas—Palmerah Station	Outside the station

== Places nearby ==
- Sumenep Park
- Latuharhary Park
- Embassy of North Korea (DPRK)

== Gallery ==
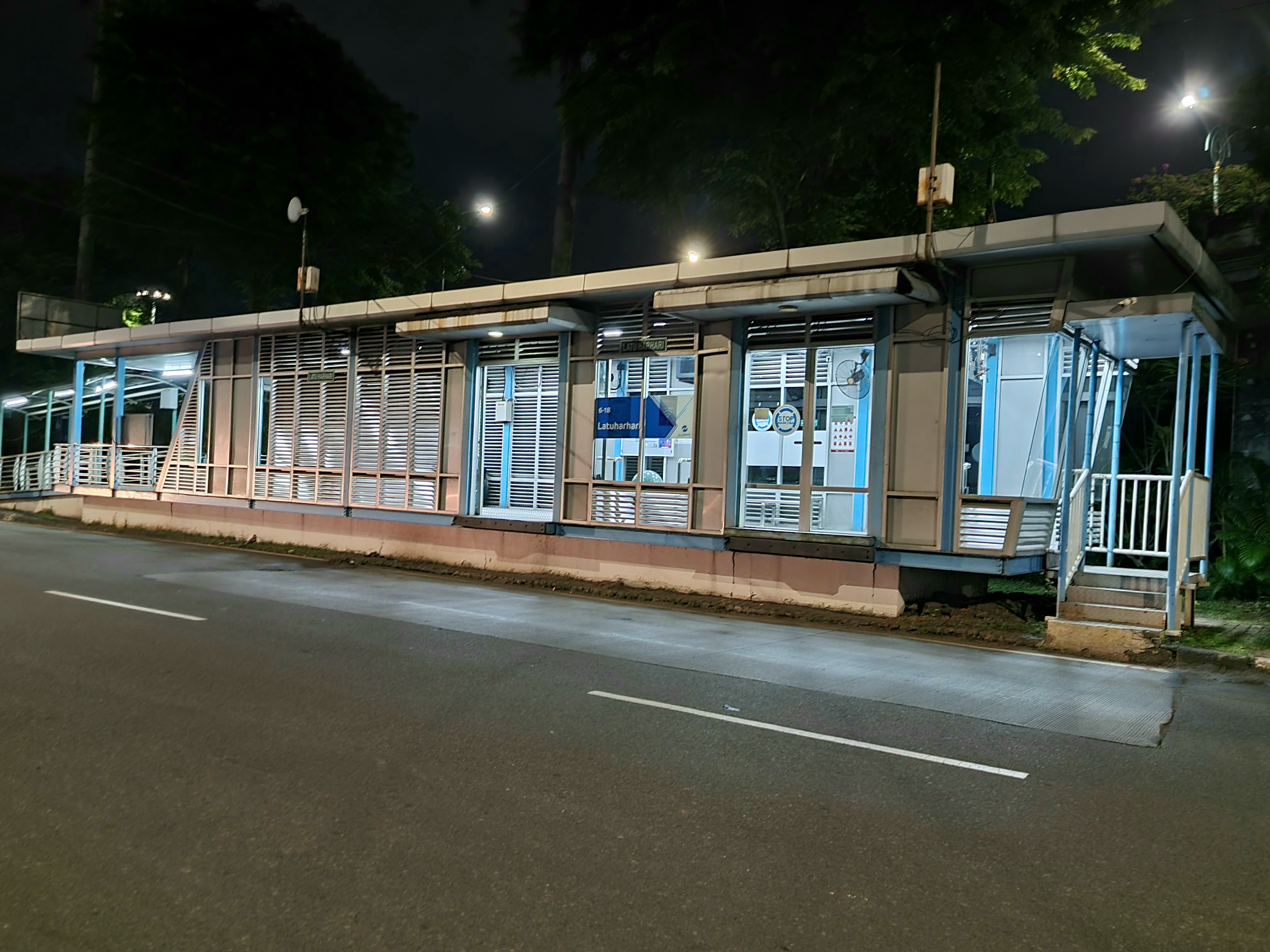
Exterior at night

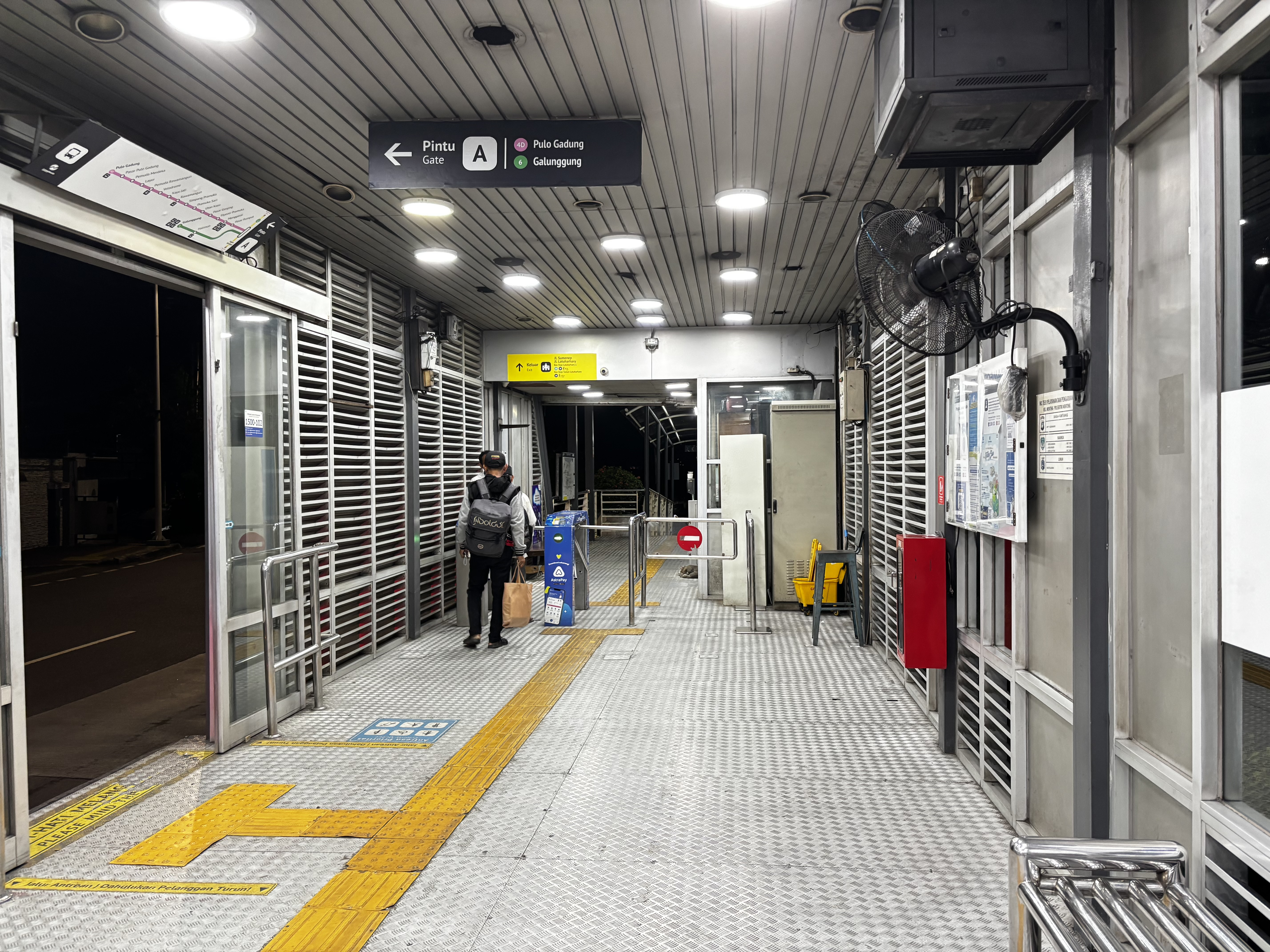
View of the platform area
