= Swadarma ParagonCorp (Transjakarta) =

13 10 Swadarma ParagonCorp
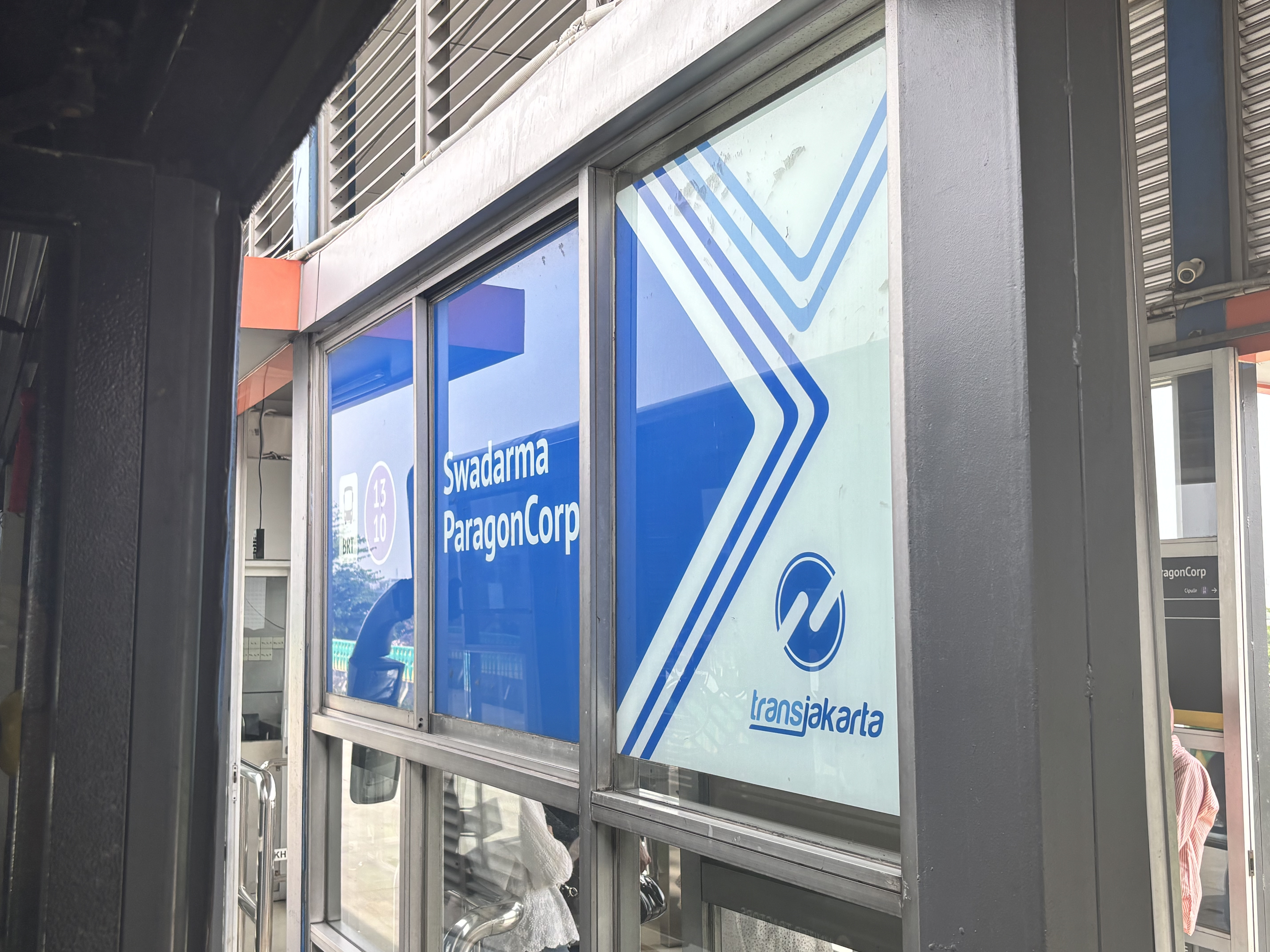
- Station name signage seen from inside the bus

General information
- Location: Ciledug Raya Boulevard, Ulujami, Pesanggrahan, South Jakarta, Indonesia
- Coordinates: 6.237475°S 106.760483°E
- System: Transjakarta bus rapid transit station
- Owner: Transjakarta
- Operator: Transjakarta
- Lines: List of TransJakarta corridors#Corridor 13 List of TransJakarta corridors#Cross-corridor routes
- Platforms: Single island platform

Construction
- Structure type: Elevated
- Cycle facilities: No

Other information
- Status: In service

History
- Opened: 1 March 2018
- Rebuilt: 23 January 2026

Services
Preceding		Following
JORR towards CBD Ciledug	Corridor 13 05:00-22:00	Cipulir towards Tegal Mampang
JORR towards Puri Beta 2	Corridor 13 22:00-05:00	Cipulir towards Tegal Mampang
JORR towards Puri Beta 2	Corridor 13 Route 13B	Cipulir towards Pancoran
JORR towards Puri Beta 2	Corridor 13 Route 13E Only available on weekends	Cipulir towards Flyover Kuningan
Location

Swadarma (or Swadarma ParagonCorp, with ParagonCorp granted for naming rights) is a Transjakarta bus rapid transit station located on Ciledug Raya Boulevard, Ulujami, Pesanggrahan, South Jakarta, Indonesia, serving Corridor 13.

== History ==
The station was first opened on 1 March 2018, alongside JORR station. When it started operations, the station had low passenger utilisation because passengers were unaware it had opened.

On 1 December 2025, renovation works on the station officially started, and was closed from 23 December 2025. It was planned to reopen on 30 December, but was delayed and reopened only on 23 January 2026. All the renovation results were inaugurated on 9 July 2026 by Jakarta Governor, Pramono Anung.

== Naming rights ==
On 16 January 2025, the station was renamed Swadarma ParagonCorp after cosmetics company ParagonCorp (PT Paragon Technology and Innovation, known under its Wardah, Make Over, and Kahf brands) signed a naming rights contract. The contract with ParagonCorp also included the company's agreement to provide water dispensers at BRT stations on the network, as well as to construct a new skybridge and install a new lift to enable step-free access at Swadarma station. The naming rights and renovation works were inaugurated by Governor Pramono Anung on 9 July 2026.

== Building and layout ==
The station features a design similar to many other stations along the Corridor 13's elevated track, with the main building being tall but narrow. It features six sets of platform doors on each side and a small toilet at one end of the station.

After construction and retrofit work in 2026, the station is one of only two wheelchair-accessible stations along Corridor 13's elevated track, the other being CSW 1. The renovated station also features a wooden pole design, similar to that of Simpang Ragunan station.

North	towards Tegal Mampang, towards Pancoran, and towards Flyover Kuningan (Cipulir) →
Island platform, doors open on the right-hand side
South	← (JORR)	towards CBD Ciledug and towards Puri Beta 2

== Incident ==
On 23 February 2026, two Transjakarta buses were involved in a head-on collision alongside the elevated track between Swadarma ParagonCorp and Cipulir stations. The two buses were Bianglala Metropolitan's Mercedes-Benz OH 1626, numbered BMP-220263, and Mayasari Bakti's Scania K310IB, numbered MYS-17100. The investigation revealed that the driver of BMP-220263 experienced microsleep and unintentionally drove the bus into the right lane instead of the left. There were no casualties, but 24 passengers were injured and taken to the hospital.
