= JORR (Transjakarta) =

Bus rapid transit station in Jakarta, Indonesia

13 11 JORR
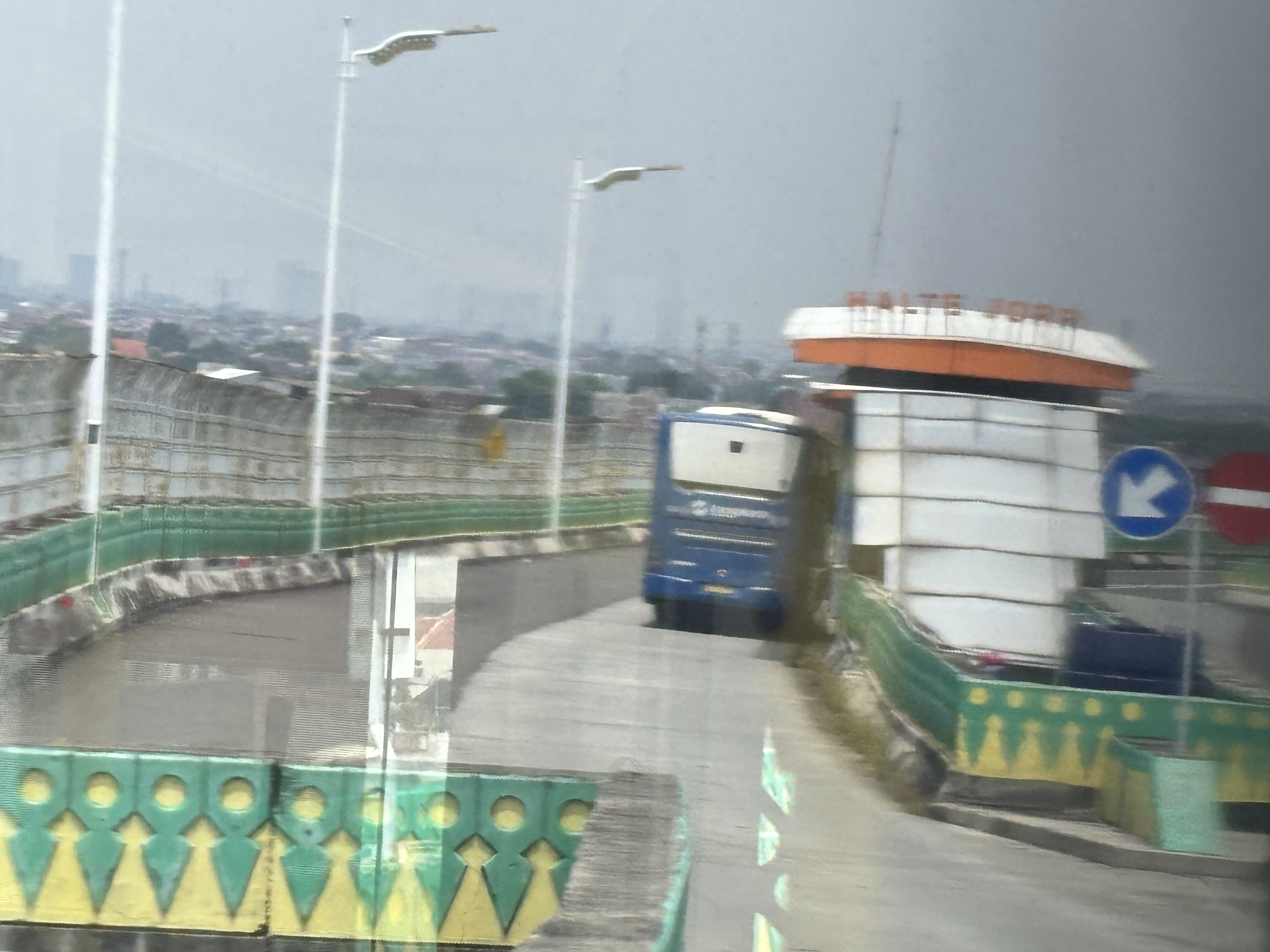
- The building seen from inside the bus

General information
- Location: Ciledug Raya Boulevard, Petukangan Utara, Pesanggrahan, South Jakarta 12260, Indonesia
- Coordinates: 6.236204°S 106.754864°E
- System: Transjakarta bus rapid transit station
- Owner: Transjakarta
- Operator: Transjakarta
- Lines: List of TransJakarta corridors#Corridor 13 List of TransJakarta corridors#Cross-corridor routes
- Platforms: Single island platform

Construction
- Structure type: Elevated
- Cycle facilities: No
- Accessible: No

Other information
- Status: In service

History
- Opened: 1 March 2018

Services
Preceding		Following
Petukangan d'Masiv towards CBD Ciledug	Corridor 13 05:00-22:00	Swadarma ParagonCorp towards Tegal Mampang
Petukangan d'Masiv towards Puri Beta 2	Corridor 13 22:00-05:00	Swadarma ParagonCorp towards Tegal Mampang
Petukangan d'Masiv towards Puri Beta 2	Corridor 13 Route 13B	Swadarma ParagonCorp towards Pancoran
Petukangan d'Masiv towards Puri Beta 2	Corridor 13 Route 13E Only available on weekends	Swadarma ParagonCorp towards Flyover Kuningan
Location

JORR is a Transjakarta bus rapid transit station located above the Ciledug Raya Boulevard, Petukangan Utara, Pesanggrahan, South Jakarta, Indonesia, serving Corridor 13. The station is located in front of Annajah Islamic School and is named after the Jakarta Outer Ring Road (JORR), which passes close to the station. It is the westernmost station that is located on the elevated track of Corridor 13.

JORR BRT station was opened on 1 March 2018 alongside Swadarma station, about seven months after the opening of Corridor 13 in August 2017.

== Building and layout ==
JORR BRT station is only accessible with a plain pedestrian bridge, and has the most number of stairs among other elevated stations of Corridor 13, namely a total of 103 stairs. CSW BRT station previously held the title with a number of 117 stairs prior to its revitalization in 2020-2021.

North	towards Tegal Mampang, towards Pancoran, and towards Flyover Kuningan (Swadarma ParagonCorp) →
Island platform, doors open on the right
South	← (Petukangan d'Masiv)	towards CBD Ciledug and towards Puri Beta 2
