= Simpang Kuningan (Transjakarta) =

Bus rapid transit station in Jakarta, Indonesia

9 11 Simpang Kuningan
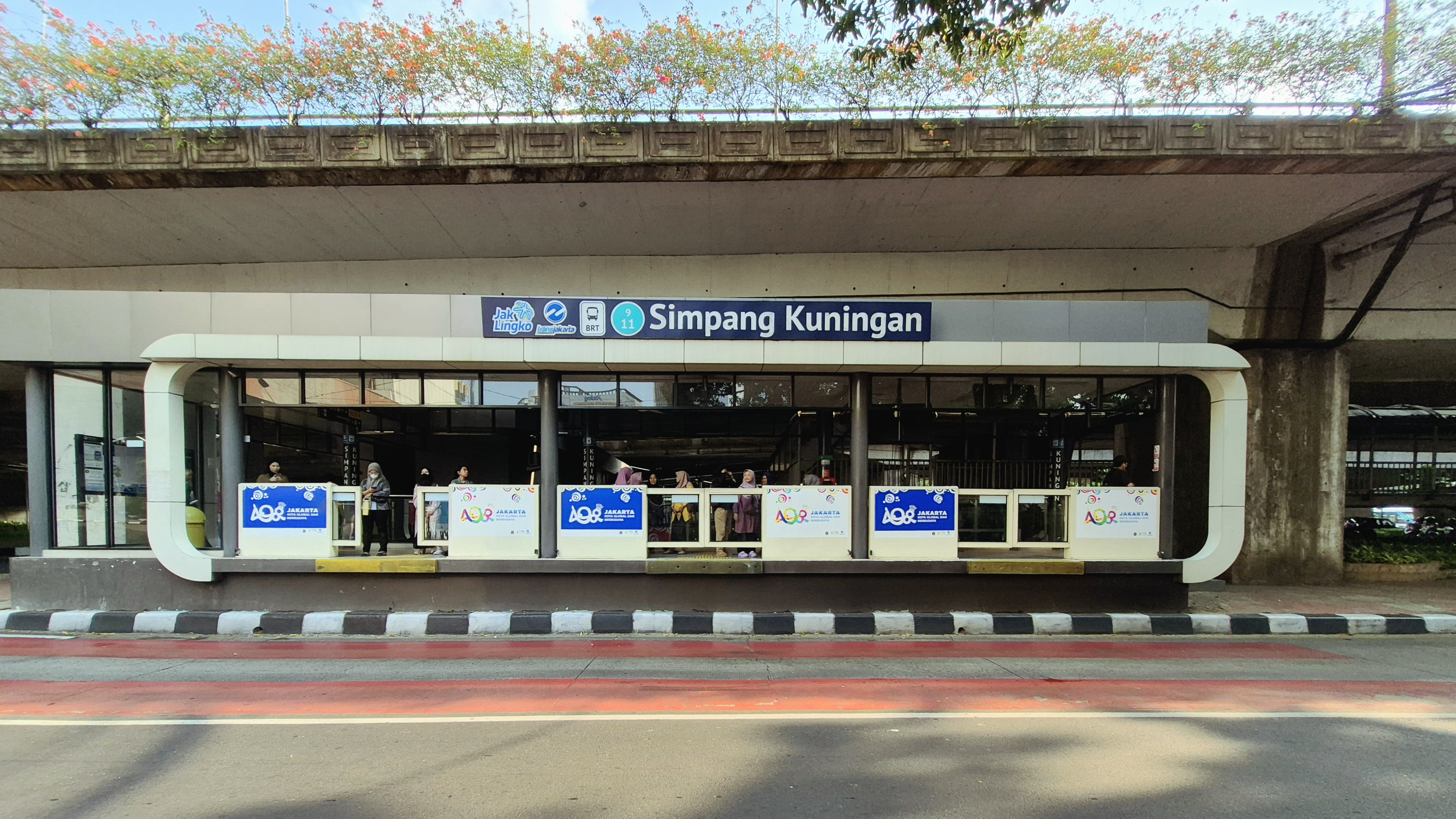
- View of the north facade for eastbound buses

General information
- Location: Jenderal Gatot Subroto St., Kuningan Barat, Mampang Prapatan (south) and Kuningan Timur, Setiabudi (north), South Jakarta 12710, Jakarta, Indonesia
- Coordinates: 6.23729°S 106.8280275°E
- System: Transjakarta
- Owner: Transjakarta
- Operator: Transjakarta
- Lines: List of TransJakarta corridors#Corridor 9 List of TransJakarta corridors#Cross-corridor routes
- Platforms: Two side platforms
- Connections: Underpass Kuningan

Construction
- Structure type: At-grade
- Cycle facilities: Bicycle parking
- Accessible: Yes

History
- Opened: 31 December 2010
- Rebuilt: 2023
- Former names: Kuningan Barat

Services
Preceding		Following
Tegal Parang towards Pinang Ranti	Corridor 9	Denpasar towards Pluit
Tegal Parang towards Cililitan	Corridor 9 Route 9A	Denpasar towards Grogol Reformasi
Tegal Parang towards Pinang Ranti	Corridor 9 Route 9C	Denpasar towards Bundaran Senayan
Rawa Barat One-way operation	Corridor 13 Route 13E Only available on weekends	Patra Kuningan towards Flyover Kuningan
CSW 1 One-way operation	Corridor 13 Route L13E Only available on weekdays	Patra Kuningan towards Flyover Kuningan
Mampang Prapatan towards Ragunan	Corridor 6 transfer at Underpass Kuningan	Patra Kuningan towards Galunggung
Mampang Prapatan towards Ragunan	Corridor 6 Route 6A transfer at Underpass Kuningan	Patra Kuningan towards Balai Kota
Tegal Mampang towards Puri Beta 2	Corridor 13 Route 13E Only available on weekends transfer at Underpass Kuningan	Patra Kuningan One-way operation
Tegal Mampang towards Puri Beta 2	Corridor 13 Route L13E Only available on weekdays transfer at Underpass Kuningan	Patra Kuningan One-way operation
Location

Simpang Kuningan is a Transjakarta bus rapid transit station at the Gatot Subroto street in Jakarta, Indonesia, serving Corridor 9. It is located east of the intersection between Gatot Subroto, Mampang Prapatan and Rasuna Said streets (hence the name 'Simpang,' Indonesian for 'intersection'). The station is located below the viaduct of the Jakarta Inner Ring Road.

== History ==
The BRT station was originally named Kuningan Barat when it first opened alongside the entire Corridor 9 on 31 December 2010, as it is located in the borderline between Kuningan Barat and Kuningan Timur administrative villages (kelurahan) of Mampang Prapatan and Setiabudi districts respectively. On 17 March 2015, the south platform bays were extended due to the construction of an overpass for westbound traffic towards Grogol Petamburan, parallel with the Inner Ring Road viaduct.

Kuningan Barat BRT station was temporarily closed for revitalization on 4 September 2022, alonside Gatot Subroto LIPI (now Widya Chandra Telkomsel), Senen Sentral (now Jaga Jakarta) and SMK 57 (now Jati Barat). After that, the station was reopened on 15 February 2023. In late December 2023, the station was renamed to Simpang Kuningan.

== Building and layout ==
Simpang Kuningan BRT station is one of the five stations of Corridor 9 to be located below the Jakarta Inner Ring Road viaduct. It is accessible via footbridge, and connected to the neighboring Underpass Kuningan station of Corridor 6. The station now has six squircle-shaped platform bays (three for each directions).

North	to Pinang Ranti and to Cililitan (Tegal Parang) →
	Side platform, the doors are opened on the right side of the travel direction
	Jakarta Inner Ring Road →	Inter platform linkway	(to Bekasi/Bogor) →
← (to Tangerang)	← Jakarta Inner Ring Road	Inter platform linkway
	Side platform, the doors are opened on the right side of the travel direction
South	↑ (Patra Kuningan) ← (Denpasar)	to Pluit, to Grogol Reformasi, and to Bundaran Senayan	to Flyover Kuningan

== Non-BRT bus services ==
Service type	Route	Destination	Notes
Inner city feeder		Cibubur → Pluit	Only operates on weekdays (Monday–Friday) on 05:00 - 06:00, one way towards Pluit only. Inside the station
Inner city feeder		Pasar Minggu–Tanah Abang	Inside the station
Royaltrans (premium)		Cibubur–Kuningan	Outside the station
Royaltrans (premium)		Summarecon Bekasi–Kuningan	Outside the station

== Nearby places ==
- PLN Indonesia Power headquarters, subsidiary of Perusahaan Listrik Negara
- Tempo Scan Tower
- Embassy of Turkey
- Perum BULOG headquarters

== Gallery ==
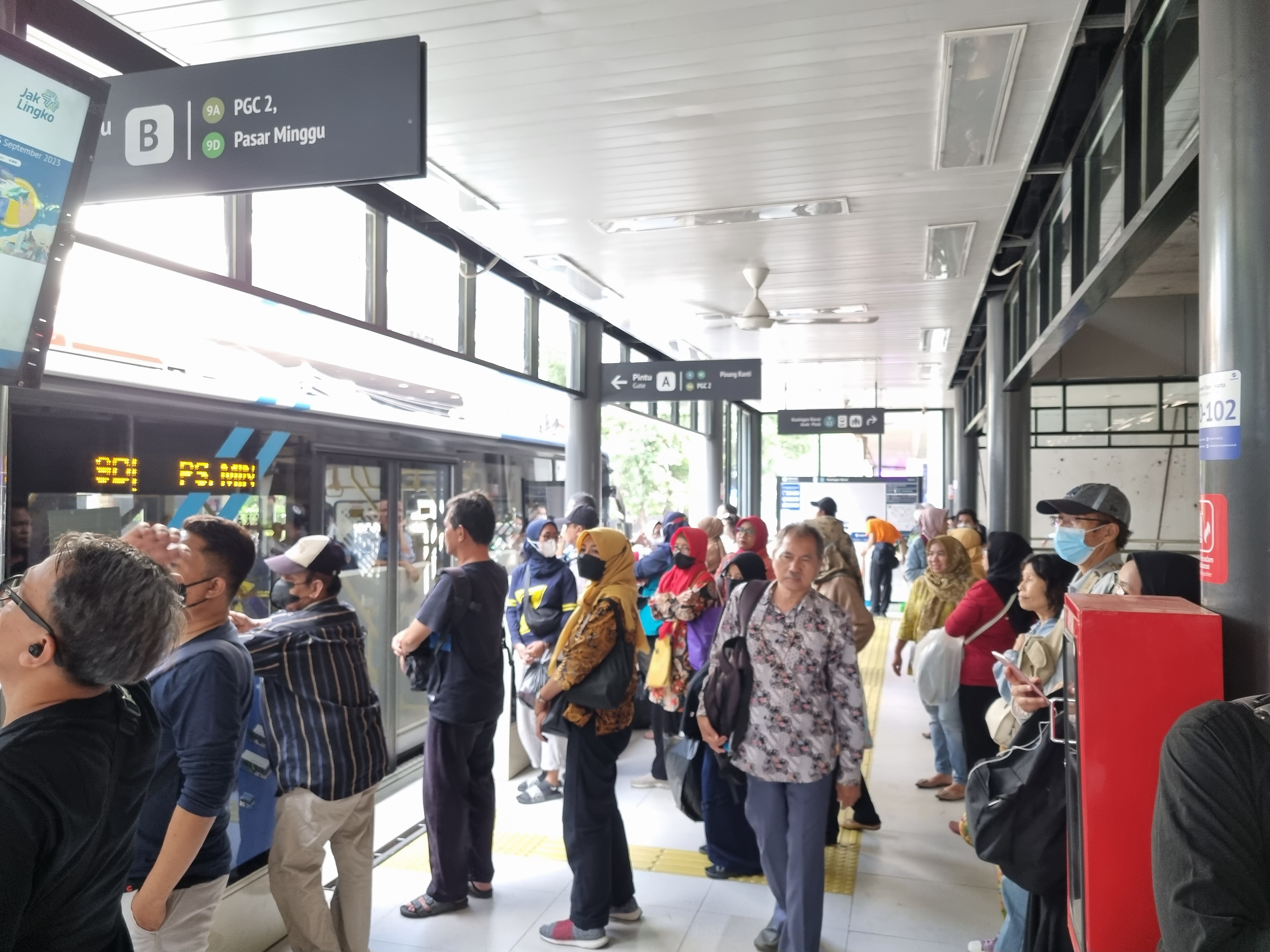
Interior of the north platform serving southbound buses, 2023

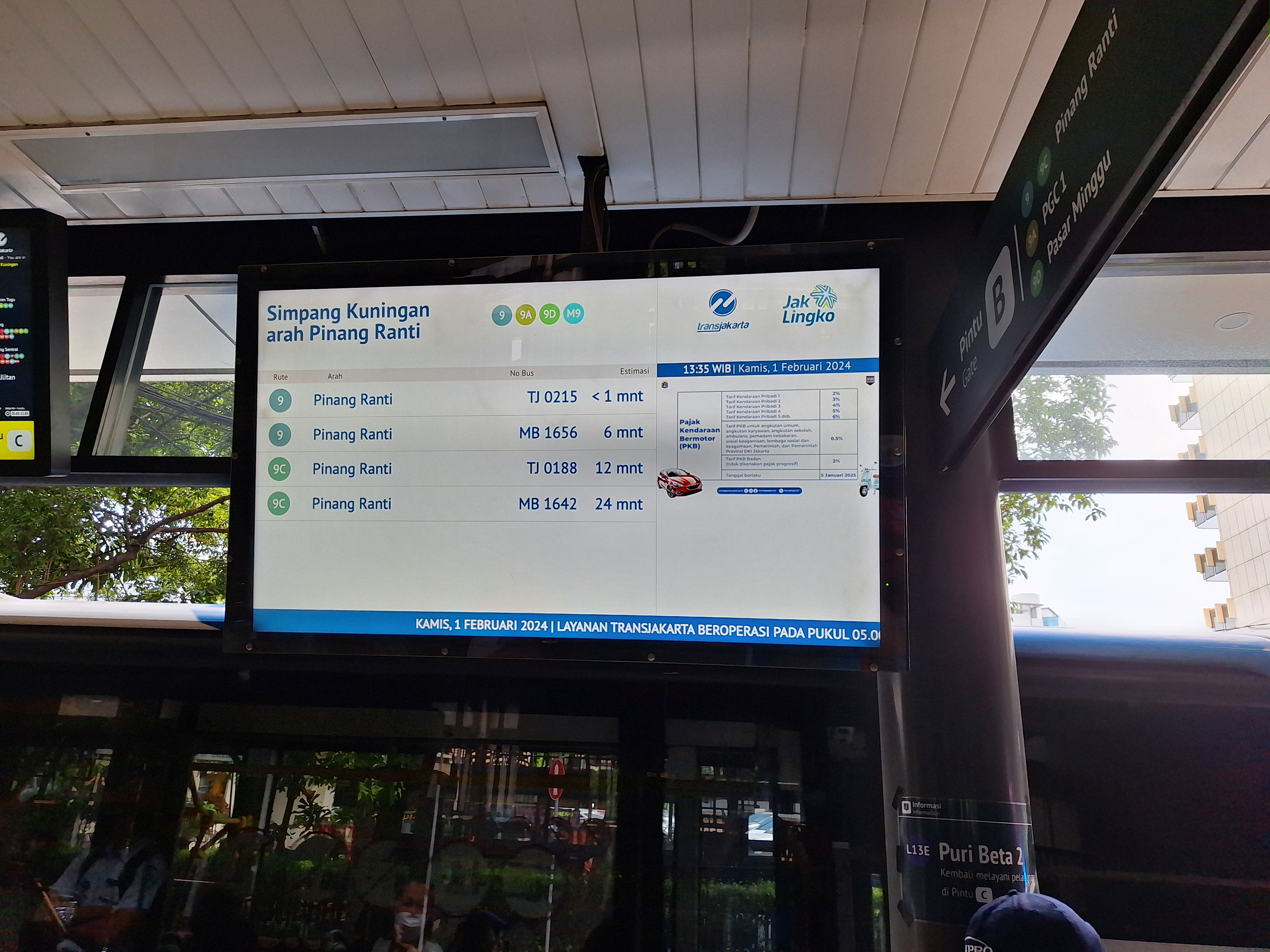
A passenger information system display, 2023

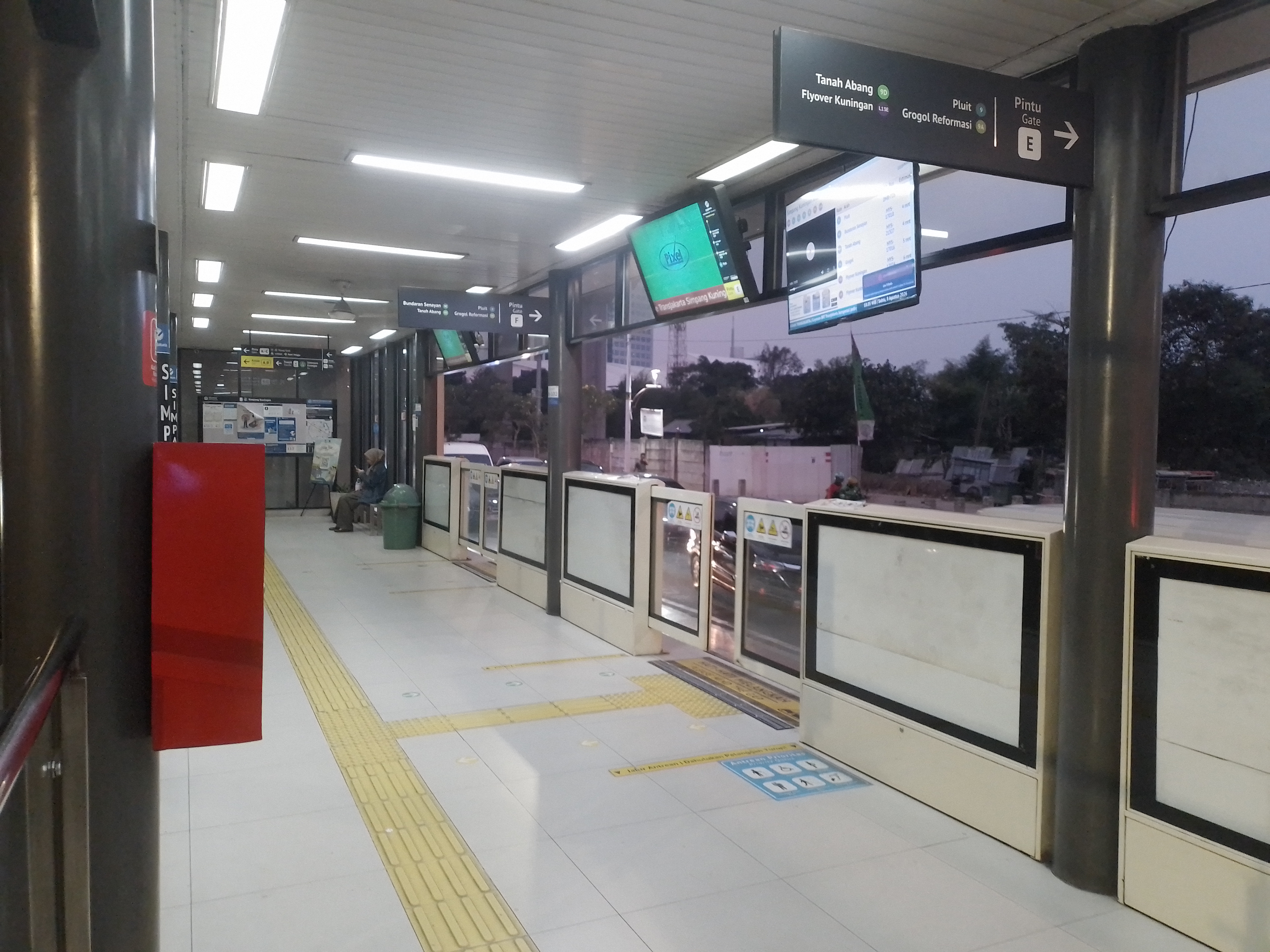
Interior of the south platform for northbound buses, 2026
