= Underpass Kuningan (Transjakarta) =

Bus rapid transit station in Jakarta, Indonesia

6 11 Underpass Kuningan
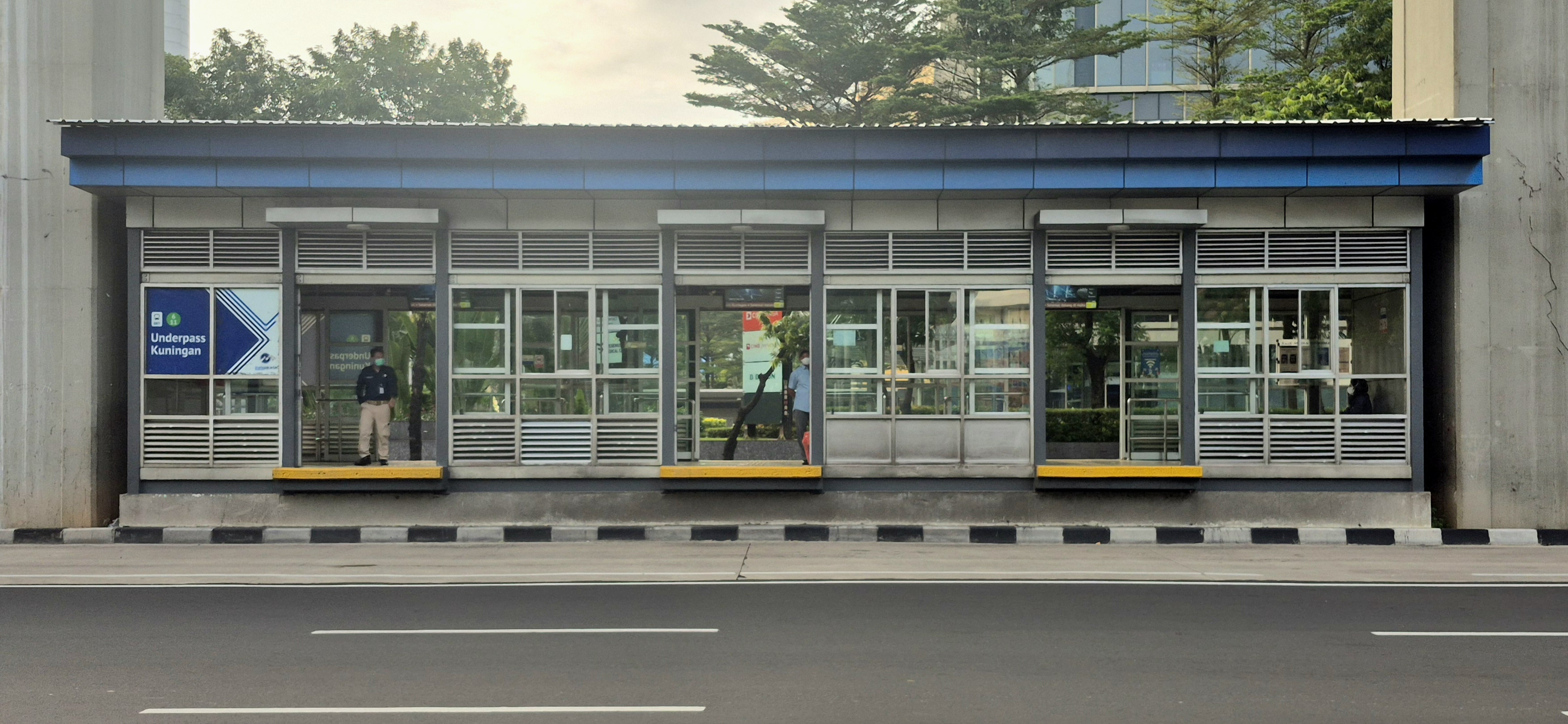
- Side view from the west

General information
- Location: H.R. Rasuna Said St., Kuningan Timur, Setiabudi, South Jakarta, Jakarta, Indonesia
- Coordinates: 6.235831°S 106.82814°E
- System: Transjakarta
- Owner: Transjakarta
- Operator: Transjakarta
- Lines: List of TransJakarta corridors#Corridor 6 List of TransJakarta corridors#Cross-corridor routes
- Platforms: Single island platform
- Connections: Simpang Kuningan

Construction
- Structure type: At-grade
- Cycle facilities: No≥

History
- Opened: 27 January 2007
- Rebuilt: 2018 • 2021
- Former names: Kuningan Timur

Services
Preceding		Following
Mampang Prapatan towards Ragunan	Corridor 6	Patra Kuningan towards Galunggung
Mampang Prapatan towards Ragunan	Corridor 6 Route 6A	Patra Kuningan towards Balai Kota
Tegal Mampang towards Puri Beta 2	Corridor 13 Route 13E Only available on weekends	Patra Kuningan One-way operation
Rawa Barat One-way operation	Corridor 13 Route 13E Only available on weekends transfer at Simpang Kuningan	Patra Kuningan towards Flyover Kuningan
Tegal Mampang towards Puri Beta 2	Corridor 13 Route L13E Only available on weekdays	Patra Kuningan One-way operation
CSW 1 One-way operation	Corridor 13 Route L13E Only available on weekdays transfer at Simpang Kuningan	Patra Kuningan towards Flyover Kuningan
Tegal Parang towards Pinang Ranti	Corridor 9 transfer at Simpang Kuningan	Denpasar towards Pluit
Tegal Parang towards Cililitan	Corridor 9 Route 9A transfer at Simpang Kuningan	Denpasar towards Grogol Reformasi
Tegal Parang towards Pinang Ranti	Corridor 9 Route 9C transfer at Simpang Kuningan	Denpasar towards Bundaran Senayan
Location

Underpass Kuningan is a Transjakarta bus rapid transit station, located near the southern end of the H.R. Rasuna Said street in Jakarta, Indonesia, primarily serving Corridor 6. It is named after a traffic underpass to the south, and connected to the Simpang Kuningan station of Corridor 9 to the south by a transfer bridge.

== History ==
Underpass Kuningan BRT station was originally named Kuningan Timur (Indonesian for 'East Kuningan') because it is located within the administrative village (kelurahan) of the same name. It commenced operations alongside the opening of Corridor 6 on 27 January 2007, and was originally located at the southern end of H.R. Rasuna Said street, adjacent with the Turkish Embassy to the east.

In 2017, the Jakarta Provincial Government started the construction of a traffic underpass below the severely congested intersections between Rasuna Said, Gatot Subroto, Mampang Prapatan, and Kapten Tendean streets, which was finished in April 2018. Because of this, on 2 February 2018, Kuningan Timur BRT station was relocated about 160 metres to the north, adjacent with the Dutch Embassy to the west, as the original building would be demolished for the underpass. Its access bridge and transfer access to Kuningan Barat (now Simpang Kuningan) station was modified to accommodate the underpass as well. Sometime between late 2018 to early 2019, the station building was temporarily demolished to make way for the construction of the Jabodebek LRT elevated track pillars. After that, the station was rebuilt and reopened on 18 June 2021.

In late December 2023, Kuningan Timur BRT station was renamed into Underpass Kuningan.

== Building and layout ==
The current building of Underpass Kuningan BRT station is far longer than the original one, with a total of 12 platform bays (6 for each directions).

West		to Galunggung and to Balai Kota	(Patra Kuningan) →
Island platform, the doors are opened on the right side of the bus travel direction
East	← (Mampang Prapatan) to Ragunan	to Puri Beta 2

== Non-BRT bus services ==
Service type	Route	Destination	Notes
Inner city feeder		Lebak Bulus–Senen	Inside the station
Inner city feeder		Blok M–Manggarai Station	Inside the station
Royaltrans (premium)		Cibubur Junction–Setiabudi LRT Station	Outside the station
Royaltrans (premium)		Summarecon Bekasi–Setiabudi LRT Station	Outside the station
Royaltrans (premium)		SouthCity Cinere–Setiabudi LRT Station	Outside the station

== Nearby places ==
- Embassy of the Netherlands
- Embassy of Switzerland
- Embassy of Hungary
- Embassy of Singapore
- Embassy of Poland
- Gran Meliá Jakarta Hotel
- Tempo Scan Tower
- Jakarta High Prosecutor's Office
- Embassy of Turkey

== Gallery ==
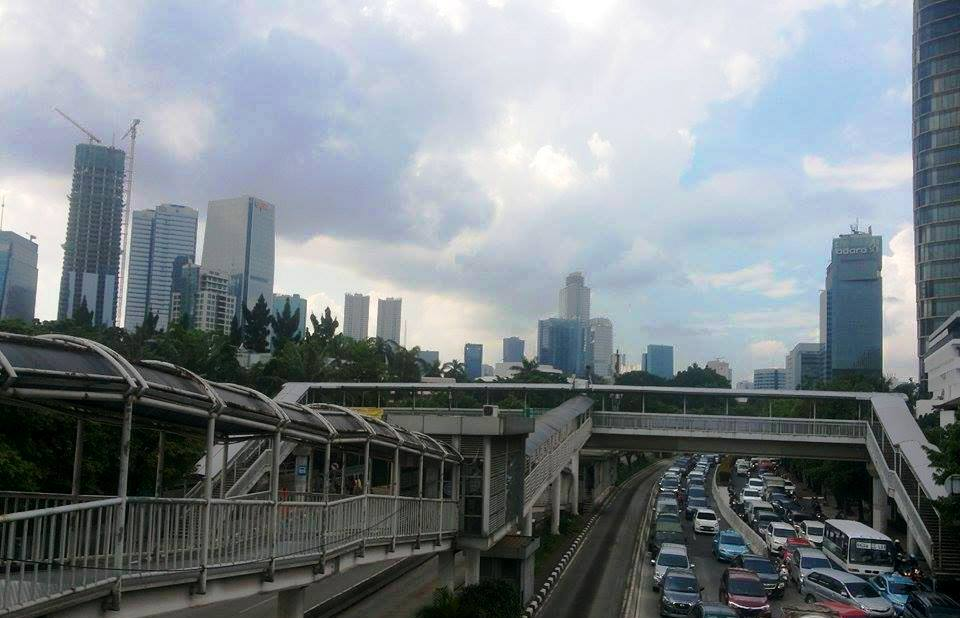
Remote view of the original building in 2017, seen from the transfer bridge to Simpang Kuningan (then-named Kuningan Barat) station

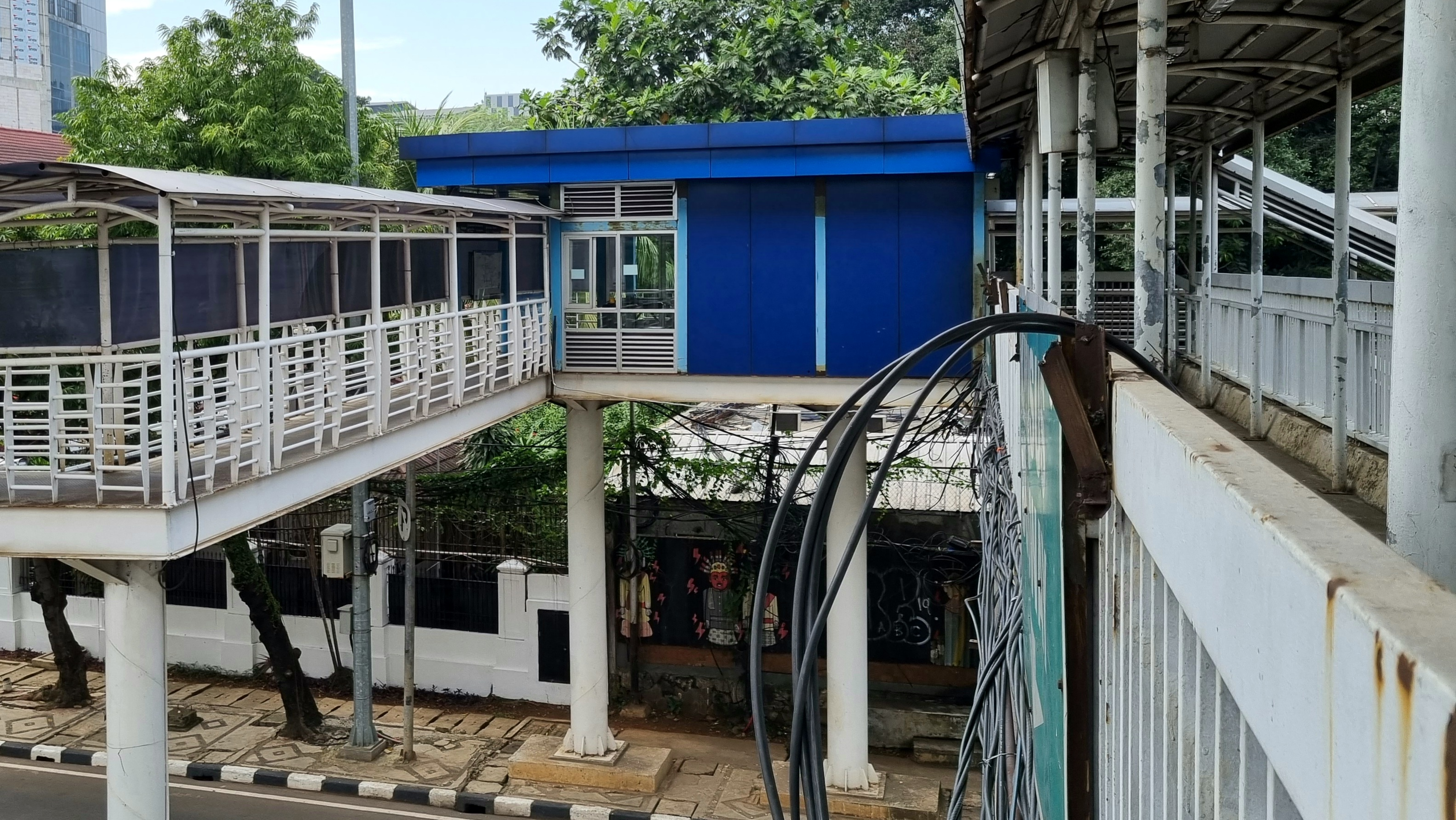
The grade-separated entrance building, 2022

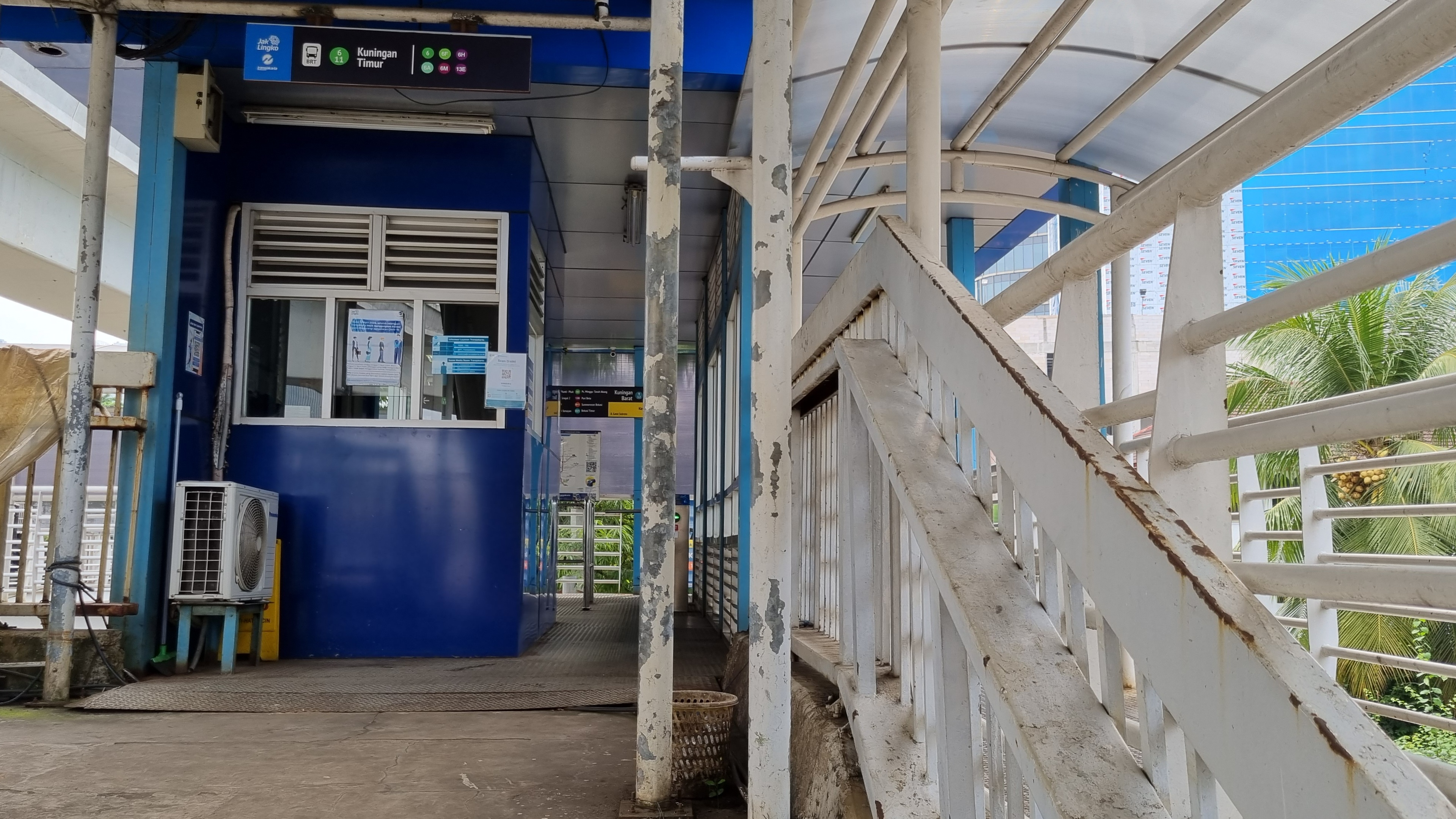
Entrance to the station via footbridge, 2022

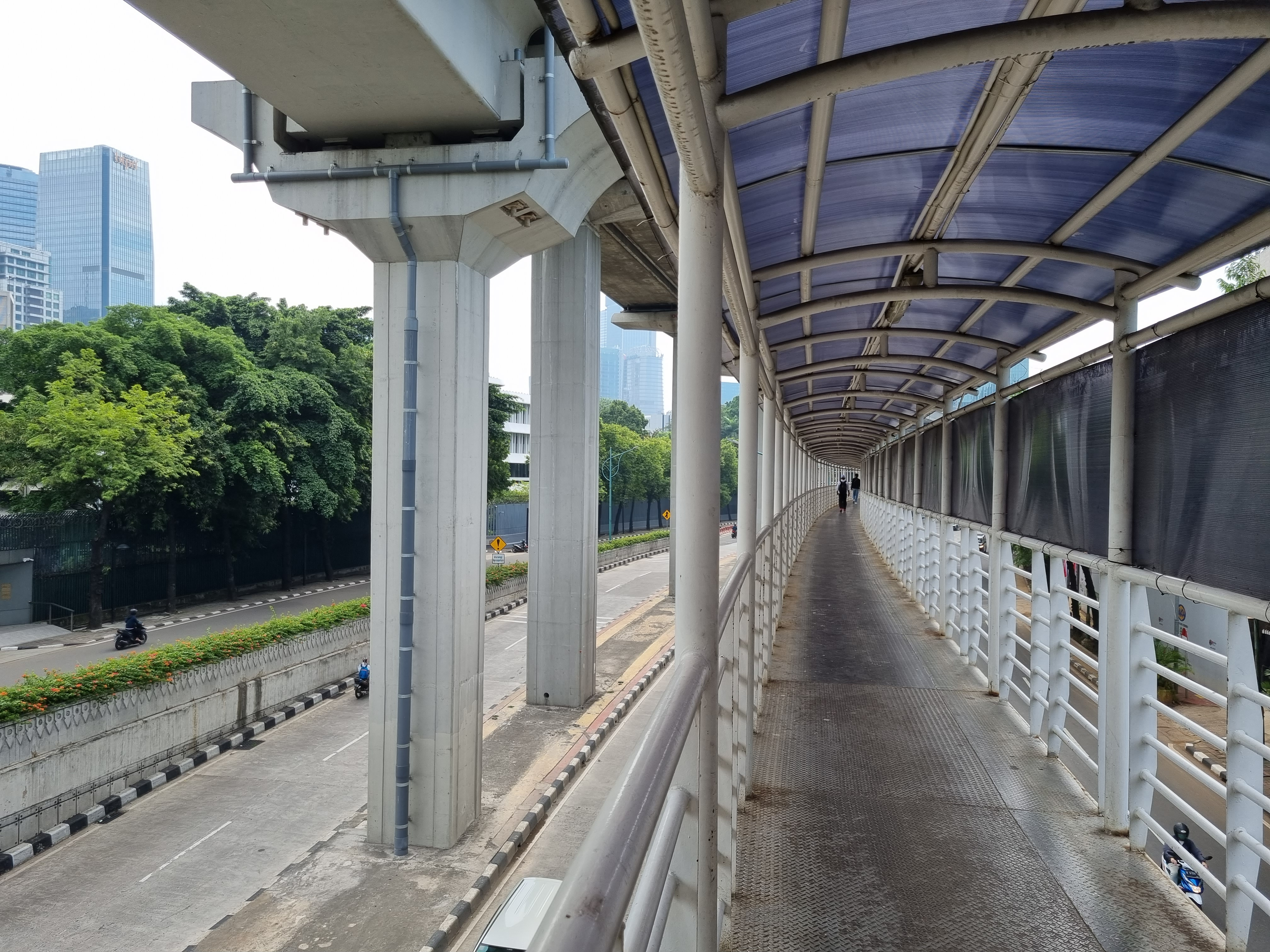
The footbridge to the BRT station that follows the underpass, 2022

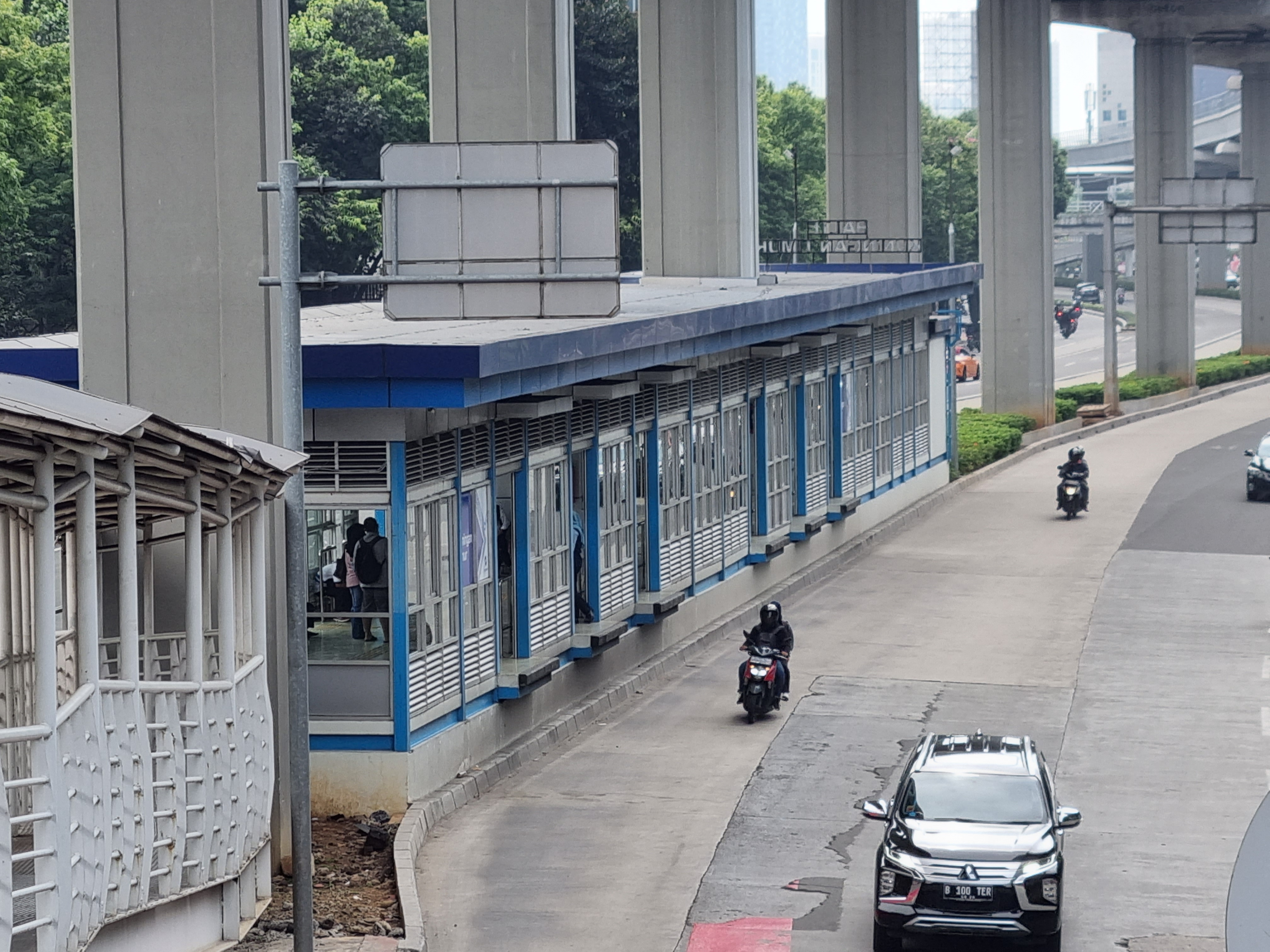
The building seen from the footbridge

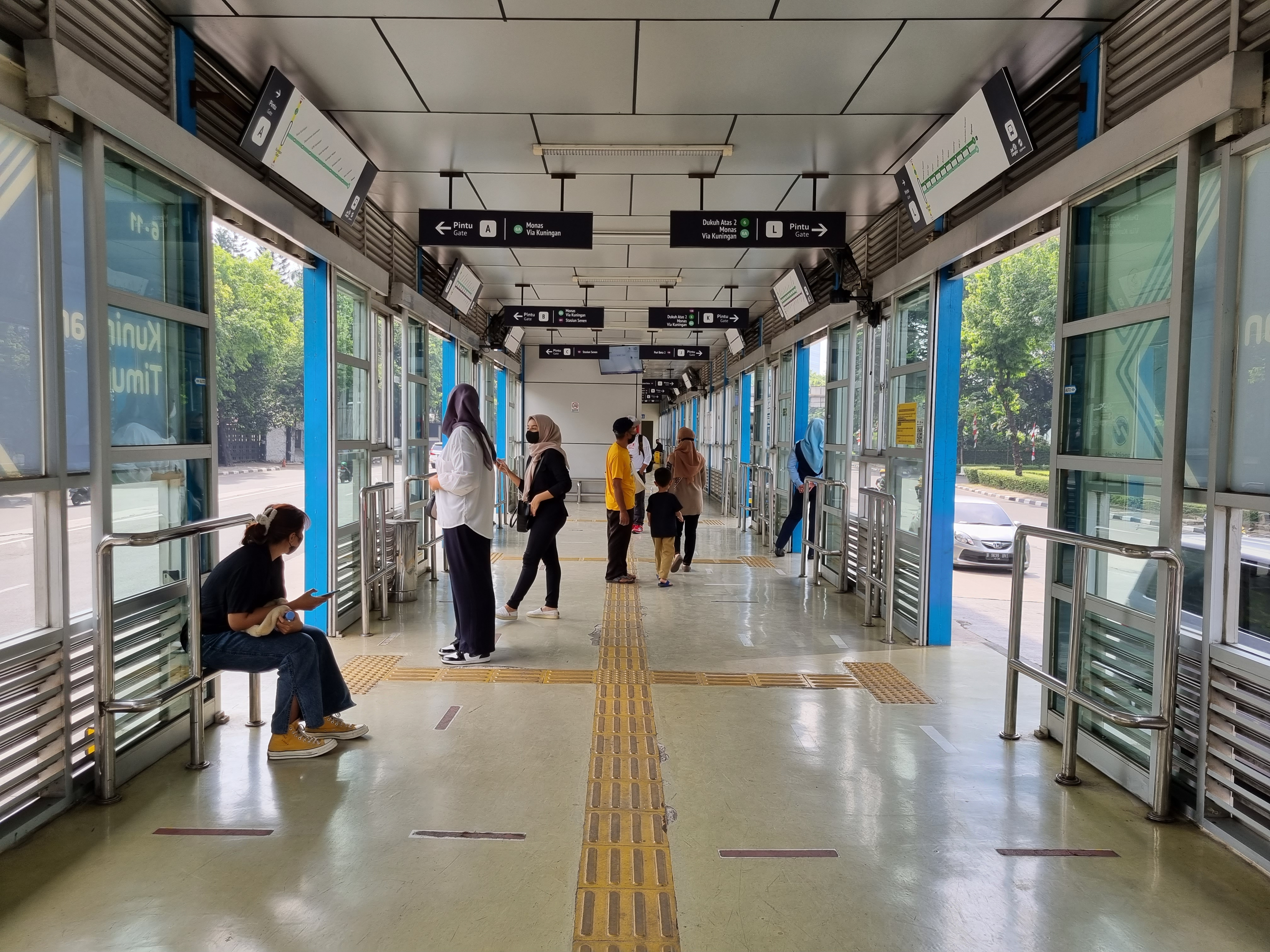
View of the platform area

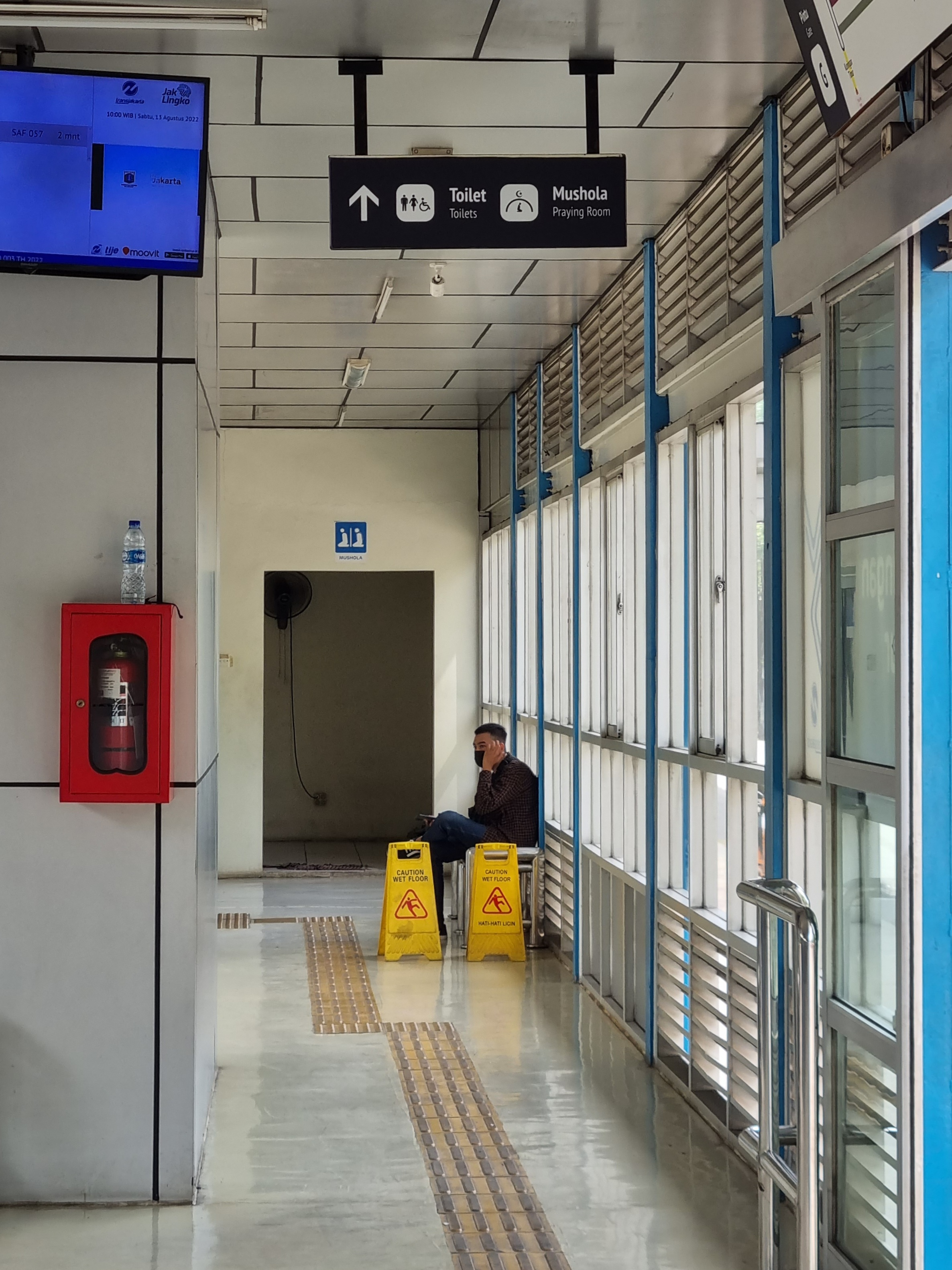
Toilets and a prayer room (musala) at the north end of the building
