= Denpasar (Transjakarta) =

Bus station in Jakarta, Indonesia

9 12 Denpasar
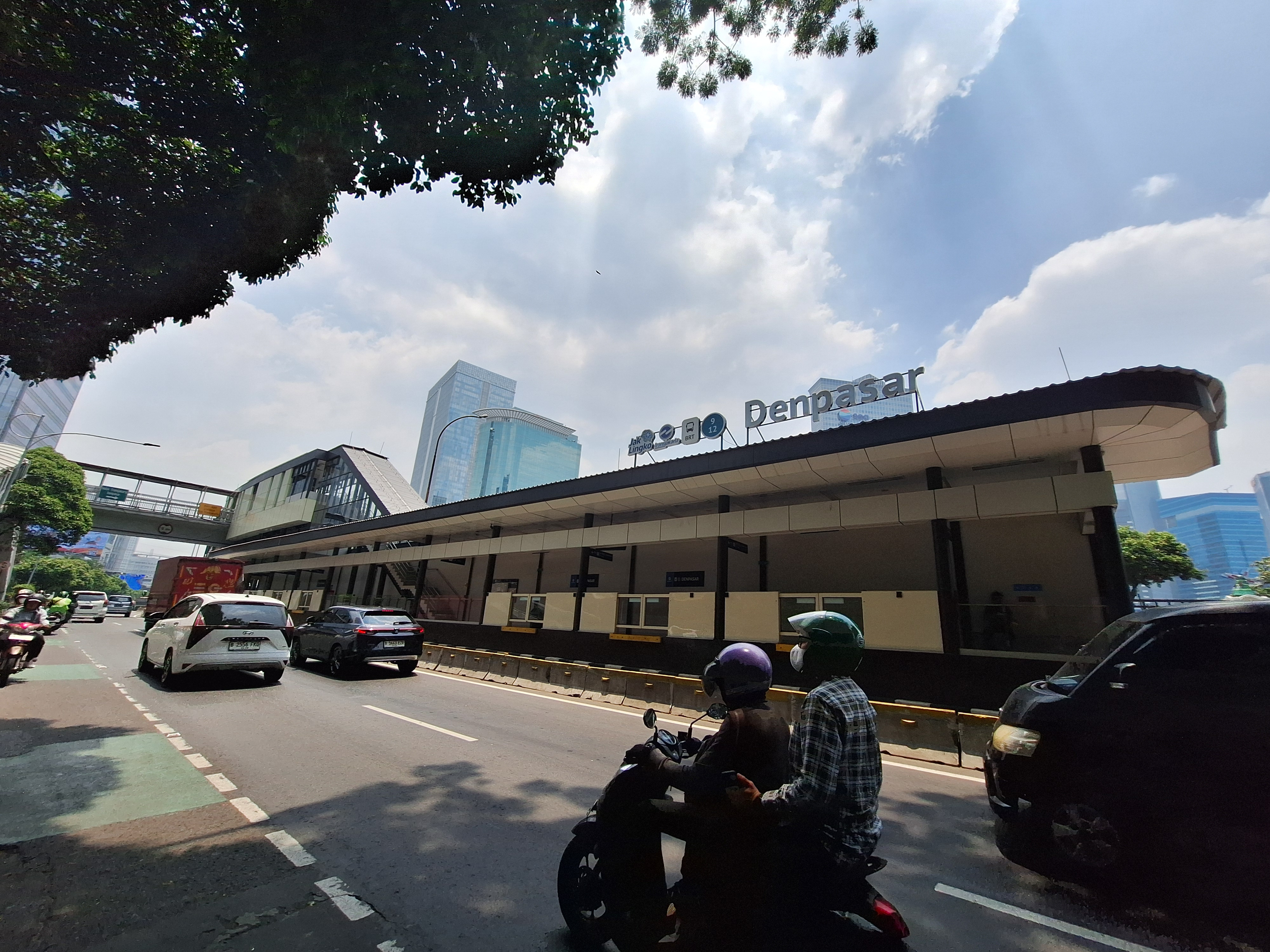
- Eastbound station viewed from outside, 2025

General information
- Location: Jenderal Gatot Subroto St., Kuningan Timur, Setiabudi (eastbound) and Kuningan Barat, Mampang Prapatan (westbound), South Jakarta, Jakarta, Indonesia
- Coordinates: 6.2270°S 106.8173°E
- System: Transjakarta
- Owner: Transjakarta
- Operator: Transjakarta
- Lines: List of TransJakarta corridors#Cross-corridor routes List of TransJakarta corridors#Corridor 9
- Platforms: Two side platforms

Construction
- Structure type: At-grade
- Cycle facilities: No

History
- Opened: 31 December 2010
- Rebuilt: 18 July 2024
- Former names: Gatot Subroto Jamsostek

Services
Preceding		Following
Mampang Prapatan towards Ragunan	Corridor 6 Route 6B	Widya Chandra Telkomsel towards Balai Kota
Simpang Kuningan towards Pinang Ranti	Corridor 9	Widya Chandra Telkomsel towards Pluit
Simpang Kuningan towards Cililitan	Corridor 9 Route 9A	Widya Chandra Telkomsel towards Grogol Reformasi
Simpang Kuningan towards Pinang Ranti	Corridor 9 Route 9C	Widya Chandra Telkomsel towards Bundaran Senayan
Location

Denpasar is a Transjakarta bus rapid transit station located on Jenderal Gatot Subroto Street, Kuningan Barat, Mampang Prapatan, South Jakarta, Indonesia, serving Corridor 9. The station is named after a street located across the street some distance from the station, Denpasar Raya Street, taken from the city with the same name in Bali.

== History ==
The station was originally given the working name Kuningan Timur during the construction of Corridor 9. The station's name was subsequently changed to Gatot Subroto Jamsostek to avoid confusion with another station of the same name that is now called Underpass Kuningan. The name "Gatot Subroto" came from the street where the station is located, taken from the national hero Gatot Soebroto; while "Jamsostek" refers to the adjacent headquarters of a government agency named BP Jamsostek (Badan Penyelenggara Jaminan Sosial Ketenagakerjaan, lit. 'Employment Social Security Agency', now referred as BPJS Ketenagakerjaan). The station began operations on 31 December 2010, on the launch day of Corridor 9, which was inaugurated by then Jakarta Governor Fauzi Bowo at S. Parman Podomoro City (now Tanjung Duren) station.

Transjakarta initially announced that the station would be closed on 18 October 2023 for revitalisation works. But due to passenger complaints and the need for a public socialization of the closure, the station was closed a month later on 19 November 2023. The station reopened on 18 July 2024 at 7 pm, with the new name Denpasar. The new name was announced in January 2024 as an effort to "neutralize" BRT station names from unofficial use of third-party names (in this case, "Gatot Subroto" as a historical figure, and "Jamsostek" as a government agency).

== Building and layout ==
The station, like most along the stretch of Corridor 9 adjacent to the Jakarta Inner Ring Road, comprises two separate structures, one for each direction. A paid transfer link does not connect the two structures and thus requires passengers changing direction to transferring to the opposite direction to exit the paid area and pay again.

North	towards Ragunan, towards Pinang Ranti and towards Cililitan (Simpang Kuningan) →
	Side platform, doors open on the right hand side
	Jakarta Inner Ring Road →	Eastbound (towards Bekasi/Bogor) →
← Westbound (towards Tangerang)	← Jakarta Inner Ring Road
	Side platform, doors open on the right hand side
South	← (Widya Chandra Telkomsel) towards Balai Kota, towards Pluit, towards Grogol Reformasi, and towards Bundaran Senayan

== Non-BRT bus services ==
The following is the list of non-BRT bus services available inside or outside around the station, last updated on 8 August 2024:

Type	Route	Destination	Notes
Inner city feeder		Blok M—Manggarai Station	Inside the station
Inner city feeder		Cibubur → Pluit	Inside the station
Inner city feeder		Tanah Abang Station—Pasar Minggu	Outside the station

== Places of interest ==
- BPJamsostek Tower
- Patra Jasa Office Towers
- Balai Kartini
- Wisma Mulia 1 & 2
  - Embassy of Brazil
  - Embassy of Croatia
- Satriamandala Museum
