= CSW-ASEAN TOD =

Public transit interchange station in Jakarta, Indonesia

Coordinates: 6.239085°S 106.7985954°E

M07 1 02 13 04 CSW–ASEAN TOD Pumpunan Moda CSW–ASEAN
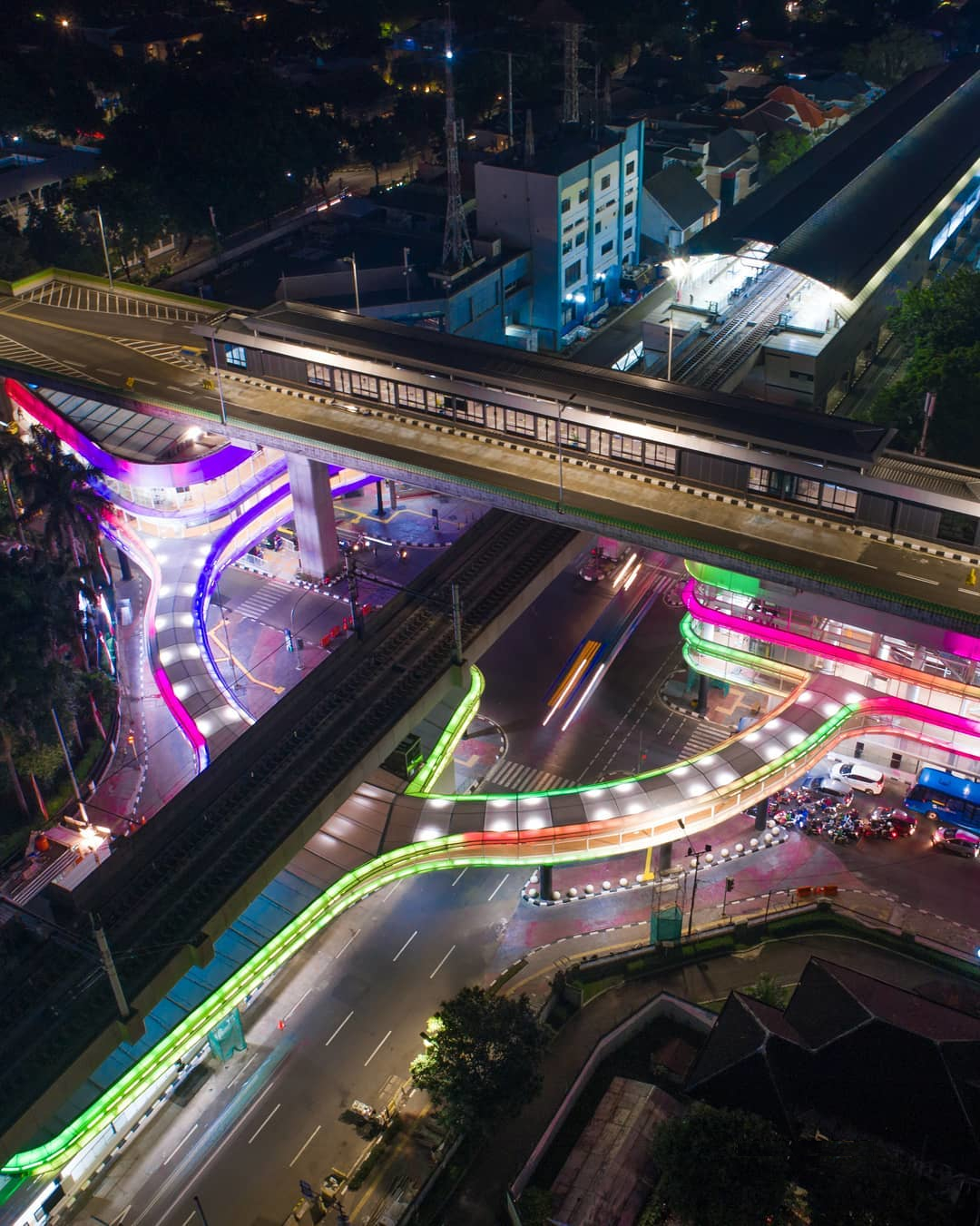
- Bird-eye view at night

General information
- Other names: CSW 1; CSW 2; ASEAN; Kejaksaan Agung
- Location: Trunojoyo Street, Kebayoran Baru, South Jakarta; Indonesia
- Owner: Moda Integrasi Transportasi Jabodetabek (MITJ)
- Operator: Transjakarta; Jakarta MRT
- Platforms: Jakarta MRT: Two side platforms Transjakarta: Single island platform and three side platforms
- Connections: Jakarta MRT: ASEAN Headquarters; Transjakarta:

Construction
- Structure type: Multilevel
- Parking: No
- Accessible: Available

Other information
- Status: In service

History
- Opened: 22 December 2021; 4 years ago

Key dates
- 2021: Commenced operations

Services
Preceding		Following
Blok M Terminus	Corridor 1 Kejaksaan Agung platform	Masjid Agung One-way operation
Blok M One-way operation	Corridor 1 ASEAN platform	Masjid Agung towards Kali Besar
Pasar Santa towards Ragunan	Corridor 6 Route 6V ASEAN platform	Masjid Agung One-way operation
Mayestik towards CBD Ciledug	Corridor 13 CSW 1; 05:00–22:00	Pasar Santa towards Tegal Mampang
Mayestik towards Puri Beta 2	Corridor 13 CSW 1 platform 22:00–05:00	Pasar Santa towards Tegal Mampang
Mayestik towards Puri Beta 2	Corridor 13 Route 13B CSW 1 platform	Pasar Santa towards Pancoran
Mayestik towards Puri Beta 2	Corridor 13 Route 13E CSW 1 platform	Pasar Santa towards Flyover Kuningan
Velbak towards Puri Beta 2	Corridor 13 Route L13E CSW 1 platform	Tegal Mampang One-way operation
Velbak One-way operation	Corridor 13 Route L13E CSW 1 platform	Simpang Kuningan towards Flyover Kuningan
Preceding station	Jakarta MRT	Following station
Senayan Mastercard towards Lebak Bulus	North-South Line transfer at ASEAN Headquarters	Blok M BCA towards Bundaran HI Bank Jakarta
Location

CSW–ASEAN TOD (Indonesian: Pumpunan Moda CSW–ASEAN) is a public transit interchange station and transit-oriented development zone between four Transjakarta BRT stations and the ASEAN Headquarters MRT station on the old Centrale Stichting Wederopbouw (lit. 'Central Foundation for Reconstruction') or CSW intersection at Kebayoran Baru, South Jakarta, Indonesia. This building is a disc-shaped circular crossing bridge, when seen from above, that connects the four BRT stations located to the west, east and south of the intersection, and the ASEAN MRT station to the north. This building began to open on December 22, 2021 for the integration of the bus rapid transit and MRT.

The 24-metre-height interchange hub is located adjacent with the Headquarters of ASEAN in the northeast and has five floors: the first floor is where the street-level CSW 2, ASEAN, and Kejaksaan Agung BRT station is located (the latter two serving northbound and southbound Corridor 1 buses respectively); the second floor has a connecting bridge from the ASEAN Headquarters MRT station and include commercials, such as retails and shops up to the third floor; the fourth floor is the access to the CSW 1 BRT station; and the fifth is the top floor where CSW 1 station is located at the elevated track of Corridor 13.

CSW–ASEAN TOD was built together with several other transit oriented developments across Jakarta to facilitate easy transfers by commuters between different mode of public transportation.

== Naming ==
CSW is an abbreviation of Centrale Stichting Wederopbouw (Dutch for 'Central Foundation for Reconstruction), which was a contractor involved in several development projects in Batavia (now Jakarta) and beyond. In 1948, the Dutch government partnered with CSW to carry out the long-delayed plan for the satellite city of Kebayoran Baru, which had been postponed for about ten years due to the war and political instability. For this development project, CSW established its own office in this area. Locals later referred to the area as "CSW Intersection." In 1951, the authority for developing Kebayoran Baru was transferred from CSW to an agency under the Ministry of Public Works of the Republic of Indonesia. Kebayoran Baru began functioning around 1953.

The architectural design of the CSW–ASEAN TOD is named Cakra Selaras Wahana (meaning "a circular building blending with all transport modes in harmony"), an "Indonesianization" of the original Dutch abbreviation. When it commenced in late 2021, the name 'ASEAN' was imbued with CSW, thus making it officially named as CSW–ASEAN. The 'ASEAN' name is added due to the building's adjacent location with the ASEAN Headquarters (formerly referred as 'ASEAN Secretariat' until 2023).

== Background ==
Although the Transjakarta Corridor 13 has been operating since August 13, 2017, buses had not been able to stop at the CSW BRT station yet for more than four years. This is because its position is too high (about 24 meters from the ground) and does not have facilities to facilitate priority passengers, especially the elderly, people with disabilities, pregnant women, and mothers/fathers carrying toddlers. In 2018, Transjakarta had planned that the CSW bus stop could be connected to the ASEAN Headquarters MRT station through the procurement of elevators, but this failed to be implemented.

In 2019, the Jakarta Provincial Government held a CSW integration building design competition, responding to the MRT Jakarta service which began operating that year. As a result, the "Cakra Selaras Wahana" design was chosen as the basis for the implementation of development. It is planned that the construction based on the design will cost IDR 30 billion.

The construction of this transportation hub began in January 2020 and is targeted to operate in August 2020. However, this building can only be completed in mid-2021. On December 22, 2021, this building was officially opened.

== Services ==
=== Transjakarta ===
There are four new Transjakarta bus stops operating at this transportation intersection. The three other stops are located on the ground floor of the building. Meanwhile, the existing CSW stop on the elevated BRT line is on the top floor of the building.

==== 13 04 CSW 1 ====
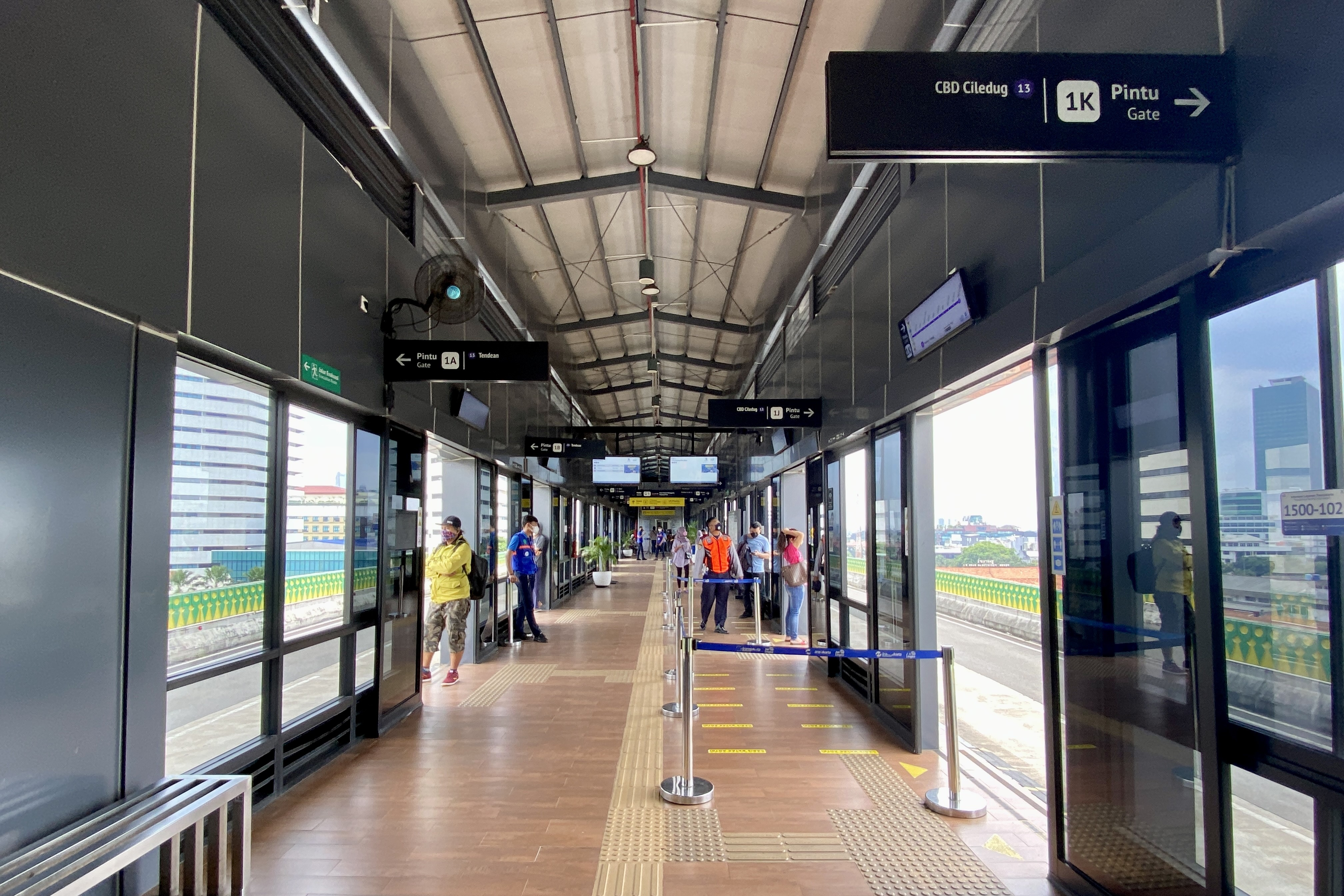
Interior of the CSW 1 BRT station, which serves corridor 13 via elevated lane

The bus station, which is located on the Transjakarta elevated lane, serves buses for regular corridors and for cross corridors, all of which are located on Corridor 13, with five platform screen doors in each direction. The station serves corridor 13, 13B, 13E and L13E.

Services at CSW 1
Service type	Corridor	Destination	Operational days	Fare (IDR)
Regular BRT	List of TransJakarta corridors#Corridor 13	CBD Ciledug – Tegal Mampang	Everyday	3,500
Regular BRT	List of TransJakarta corridors#Cross-corridor routes	Puri Beta 2 – Pancoran	Everyday	3,500
Regular BRT	Transjakarta Corridor 13	Puri Beta 2 – Flyover Kuningan	Weekends (Saturday, Sunday, and public holidays)	3,500
Regular BRT	List of TransJakarta corridors#Cross-corridor routes	Puri Beta – Flyover Kuningan (express)	Weekdays (Monday–Friday)	3,500

==== CSW 2 ====
This station only serves Transjakarta non-BRT buses, with two bus stop doors in each direction. This station serves non-BRT route 1C (Blok M–Pesanggrahan), 1M (Meruya–Blok M), 1Q (Rempoa–Blok M), 8D (Joglo–Blok M), and 8E (Bintaro–Blok M).

Services at CSW 2
Service type	Corridor	Destination	Operational days	Fare (IDR)
Inner-city feeder		Pesanggrahan – Blok M	Weekdays (Monday–Friday)	3,500
Inner-city feeder		Meruya – Blok M	Everyday	3,500
Inner-city feeder		Rempoa – Blok M	Everyday	3,500
Inner-city feeder		Joglo – Blok M	Everyday	3,500
Inner-city feeder		Bintaro – Blok M	Everyday	3,500

==== 1 02 ASEAN ====
This station serves buses for regular corridors and cross-corridors routes, with three platform screen doors in each direction. This station serves corridor 1 towards Kota only and corridor 6V towards Ragunan only. It is located adjacent with the ASEAN headquarters at north, hence the name.

Services in ASEAN
Service type	Corridor	Destination	Operational days	Fare (IDR)
Regular BRT	(towards Kota only)	Blok M → Kota	Everyday	3,500
Regular BRT	(towards Ragunan only)	Senayan Bank Jakarta → Ragunan	Everyday	3,500
Inner-city feeder	(towards Ancol only)	Blok M → Ancol	Everyday	3,500
Inner-city feeder	(towards Manggarai only)	Blok M → Manggarai Station	Everyday	3,500
Cross-border feeder (Transjabodetabek)	(towards Alam Sutera only)	Blok M → Alam Sutera	Everyday	3,500
Cross-border feeder (Transjabodetabek)	(towards PIK 2 only)	Blok M → Pantai Indah Kapuk (PIK) 2	Everyday	3,500

==== 1 02 Kejaksaan Agung ====
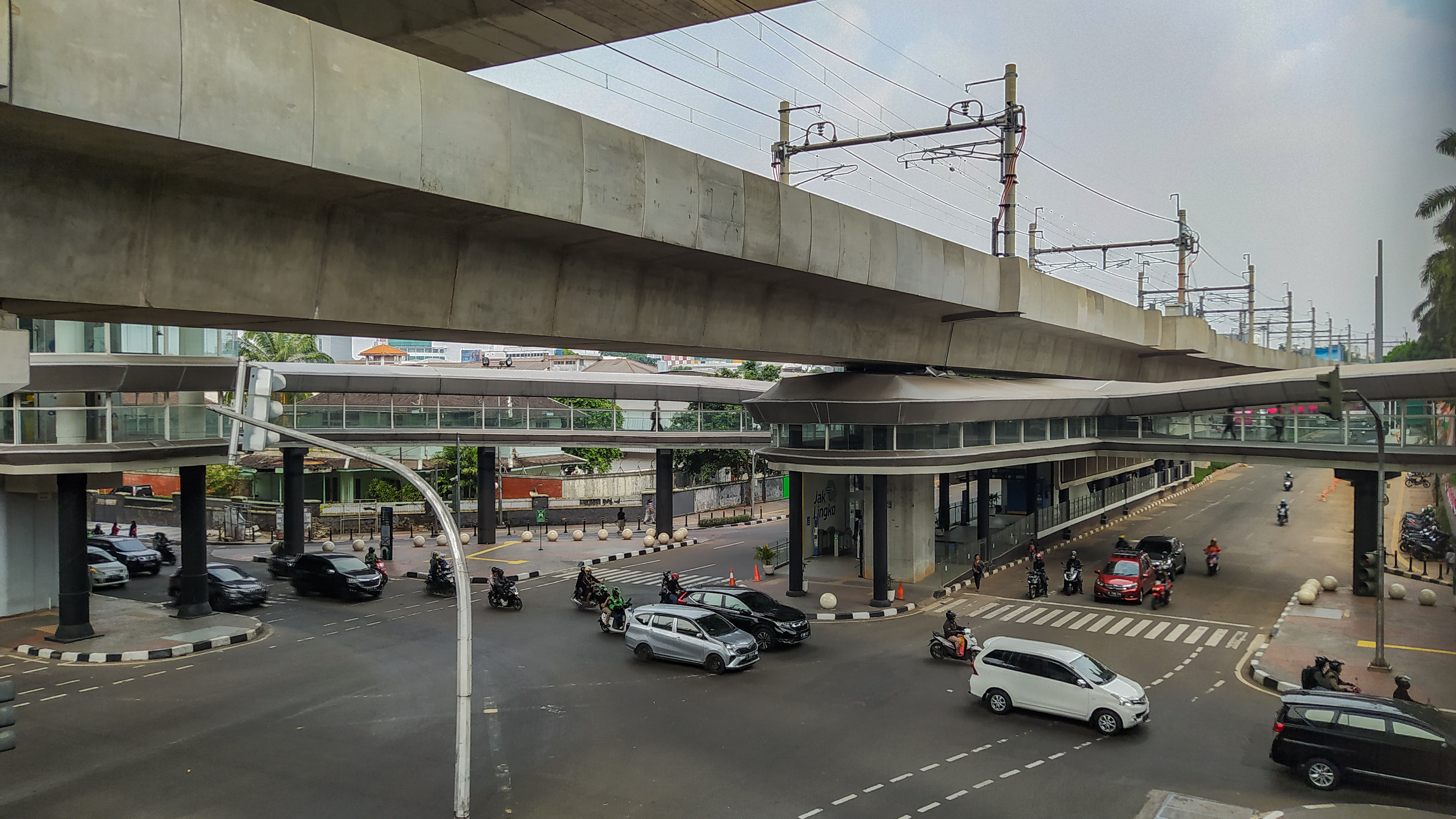
The Kejaksaan Agung BRT Station (right, slightly to the middle) and ASEAN BRT Station (left), taken from the CSW connection bridge

This station, named after the adjacent headquarters of the Attorney General's Office of Indonesia to the west, only serves corridor 1 buses to its terminus point at the Blok M bus terminal, as well as being the terminus for route 4K (Pulo Gadung – Kejaksaan Agung) with three platform screen doors on each direction. Other routes that stops in this station are 1W, 6M, 6N, 7B, 8D, 8E, P11, S61, and T31. Route S21 (Ciputat – Kejaksaan Agung) originally terminates at this station. However, since December 21, 2024, after switching into a fully disintegrated feeder route, S21 terminates on a regular bus stop in front of M Bloc Space, a creative industry hub.

Services at Kejaksaan Agung
Service type	Corridor	Destinantion	Operational days	Fare (IDR)
Regular BRT	(towards Blok M only)	Kota → Blok M	Everyday	3,500
Inner-city feeder	(towards Blok M only)	Ancol → Blok M	Everyday	3,500
Inner-city feeder		Pulo Gadung - Kejaksaan Agung	Everyday	3,500
Inner-city feeder	(towards Blok M only)	Manggarai Station → Blok M	Everyday	3,500
Inner-city feeder	(towards Blok M only)	Ragunan → Blok M	Everyday	3,500
Inner-city feeder	(towards Blok M only)	Kampung Rambutan → Blok M	Everyday	3,500
Inner-city feeder	(towards Bintaro only)	Blok M → Bintaro	Everyday	3,500
Cross-border feeder (Transjabodetabek)	(towards Blok M only)	Bogor → Blok M	Everyday	3,500
Cross-border feeder (Transjabodetabek)	(towards Blok M only)	Alam Sutera → Blok M	Everyday	3,500
Cross-border feeder (Transjabodetabek)	(towards Blok M only)	Pantai Indah Kapuk (PIK) 2 → Blok M	Everyday	3,500

=== Jakarta MRT ===
The CSW-ASEAN TOD also connects the Jakarta MRT service through the ASEAN Headquarters MRT station. Transjakarta users who get off at this transportation interchange can change to the MRT after leaving the paid area and walking through the pedestrian bridge for approximately 50 meters to the station entrance.

== Building plan ==
The CSW–ASEAN TOD consists of 5 floors of the building. Three Transjakarta stations are located on the ground floor as well as access to the building. The 2nd floor is for pedestrian access to move between BRT stations, as well as connecting the building with the MRT station. Meanwhile, CSW 1 station is located on the 5th floor, which is the highest floor in this building.

5
CSW 1
4
Shelter connector building and commercial area via escalator
3
Commercial area
Praying room
Toilet
2
Pedestrian area
Management office
Disabled toilet
Pedestrian access to the ASEAN Headquarters MRT station
1 (Ground)
Entrance/Exit Access
CSW 2 (on Kyai Maja St.)
ASEAN (on Trunojoyo St.)
Kejaksaan Agung (on Panglima Polim St.)

M Bloc (on Panglima Polim St., at front of M Bloc Space)

== Gallery ==
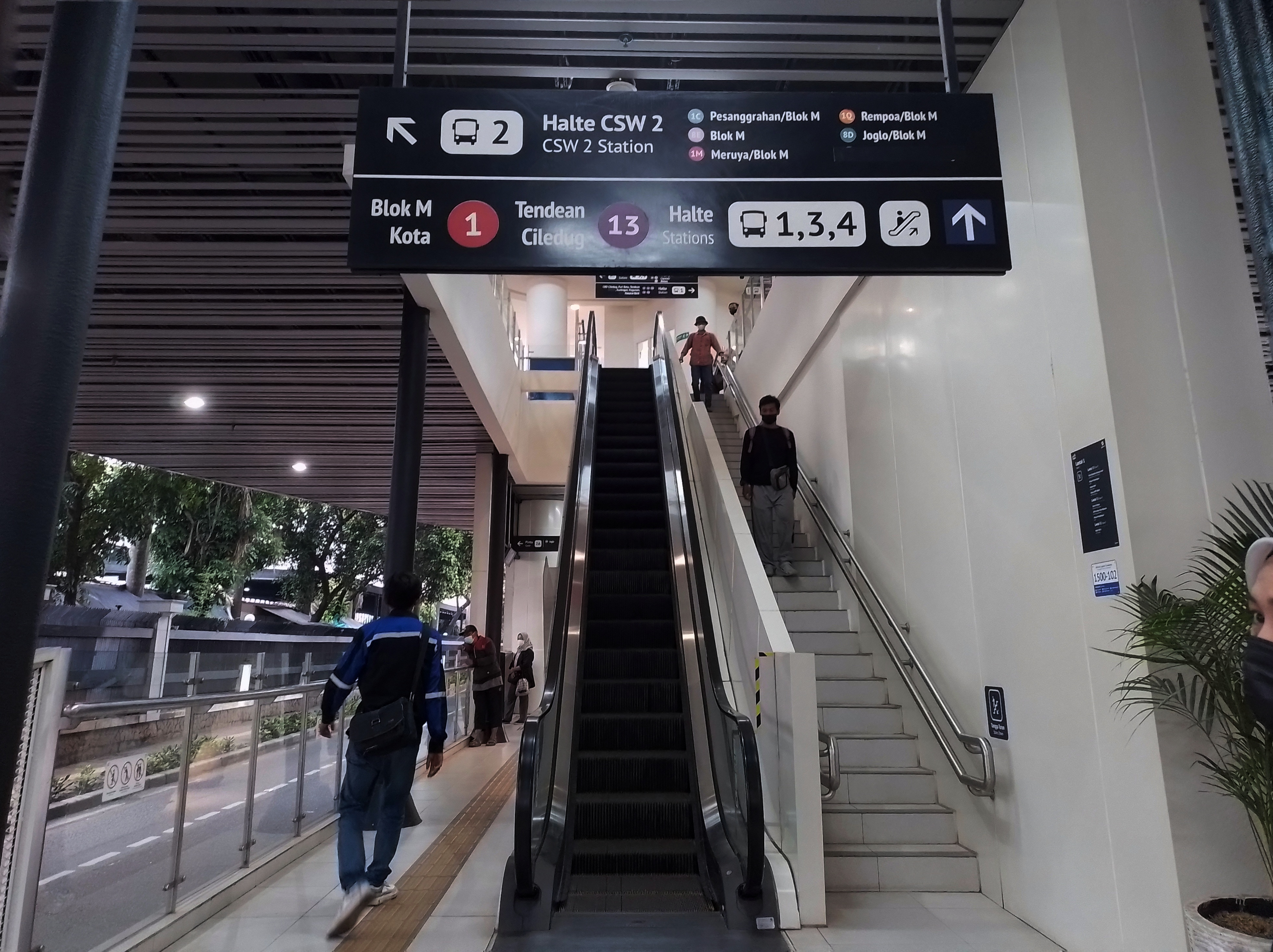
The entrance and exit access of the CSW-ASEAN TOD

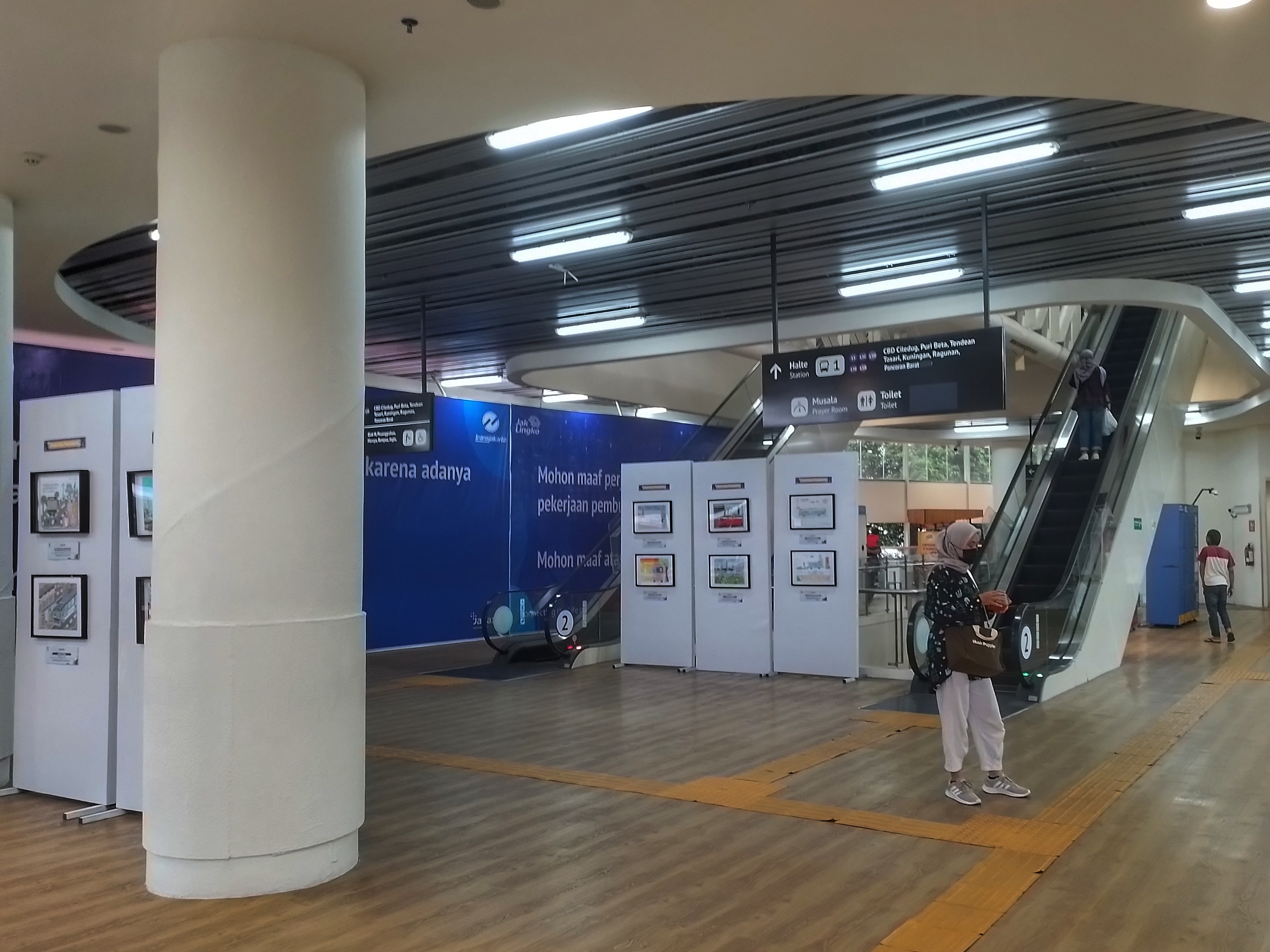
Escalators to the CSW 1 BRT station which is located at the top floor.

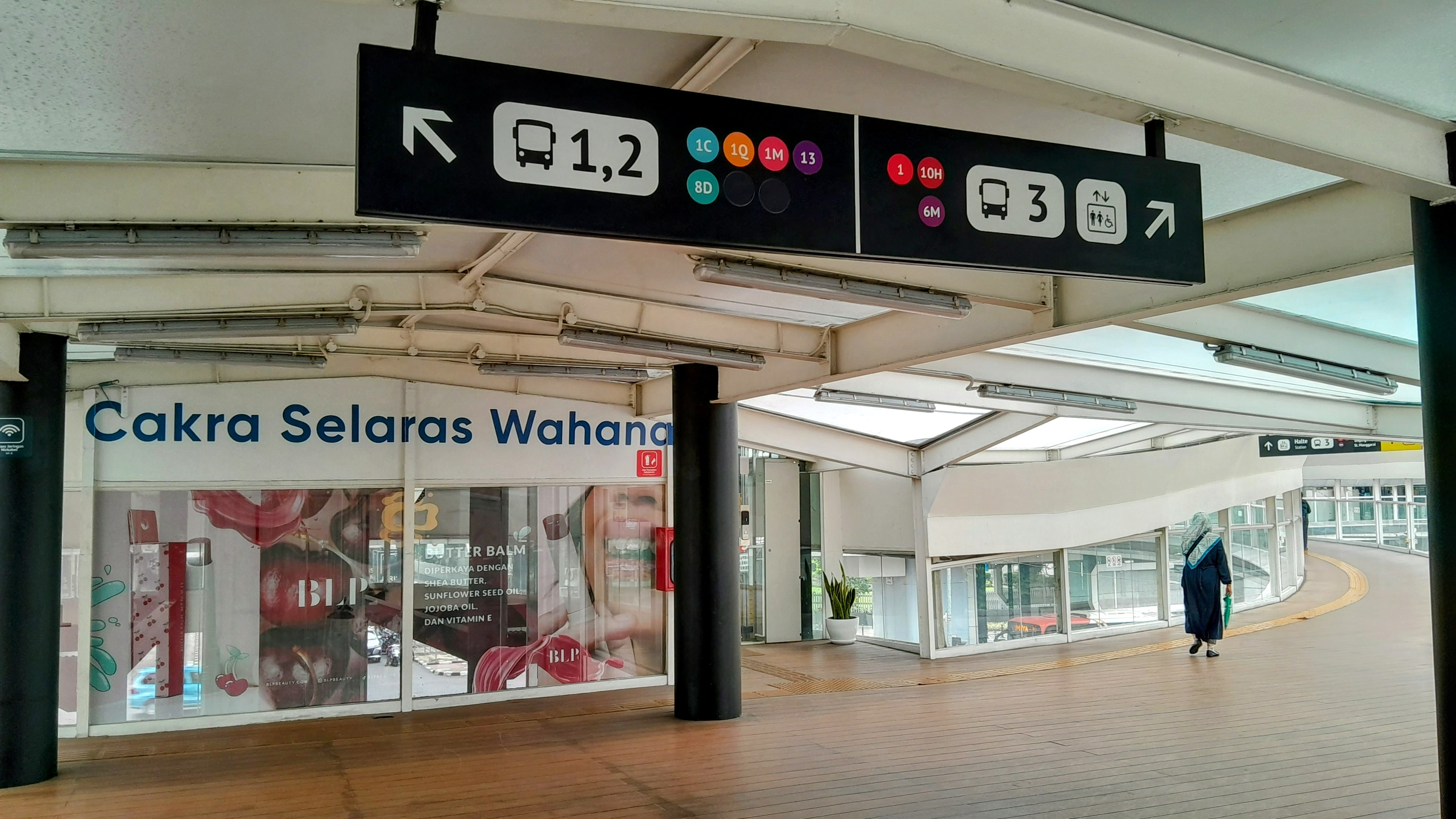
Direction signage after the entrance and exit access.

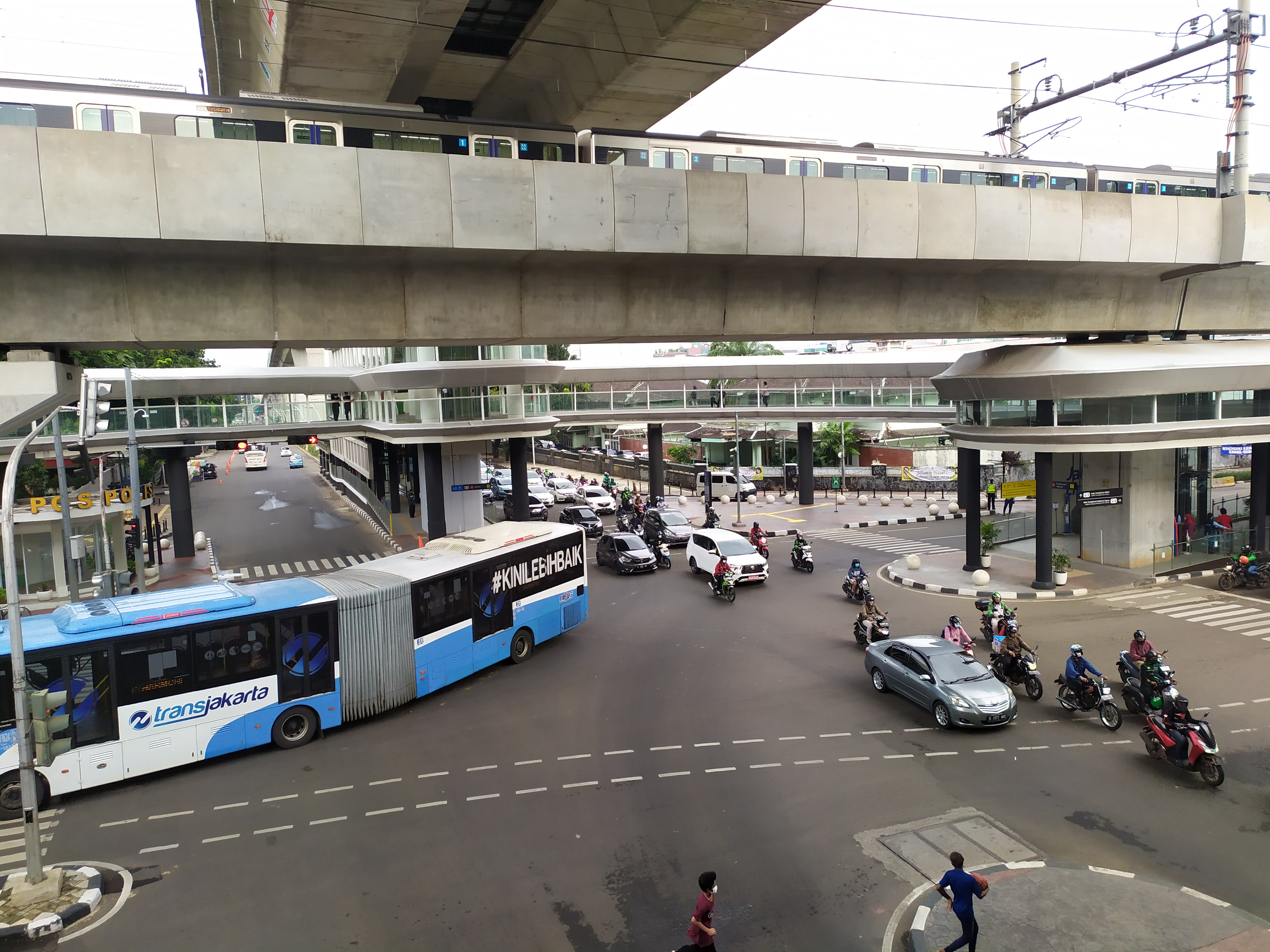
The intersection between Sisingamangaraja, Panglima Polim, Kyai Maja, and Trunojoyo streets.

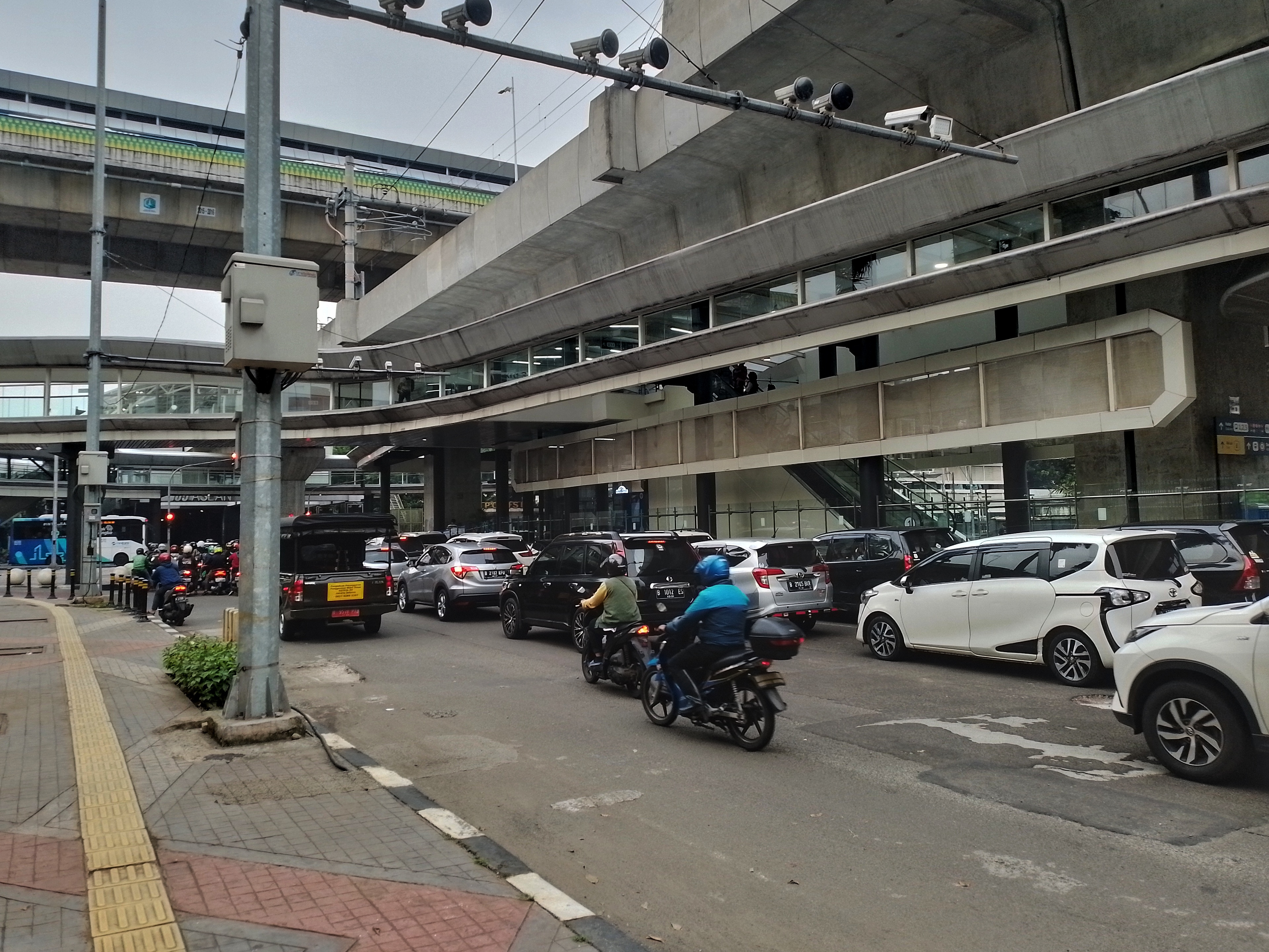
The Kejaksaan Agung BRT Station near the Attorney General's Office of Indonesia which is located at the south of the transit hub.

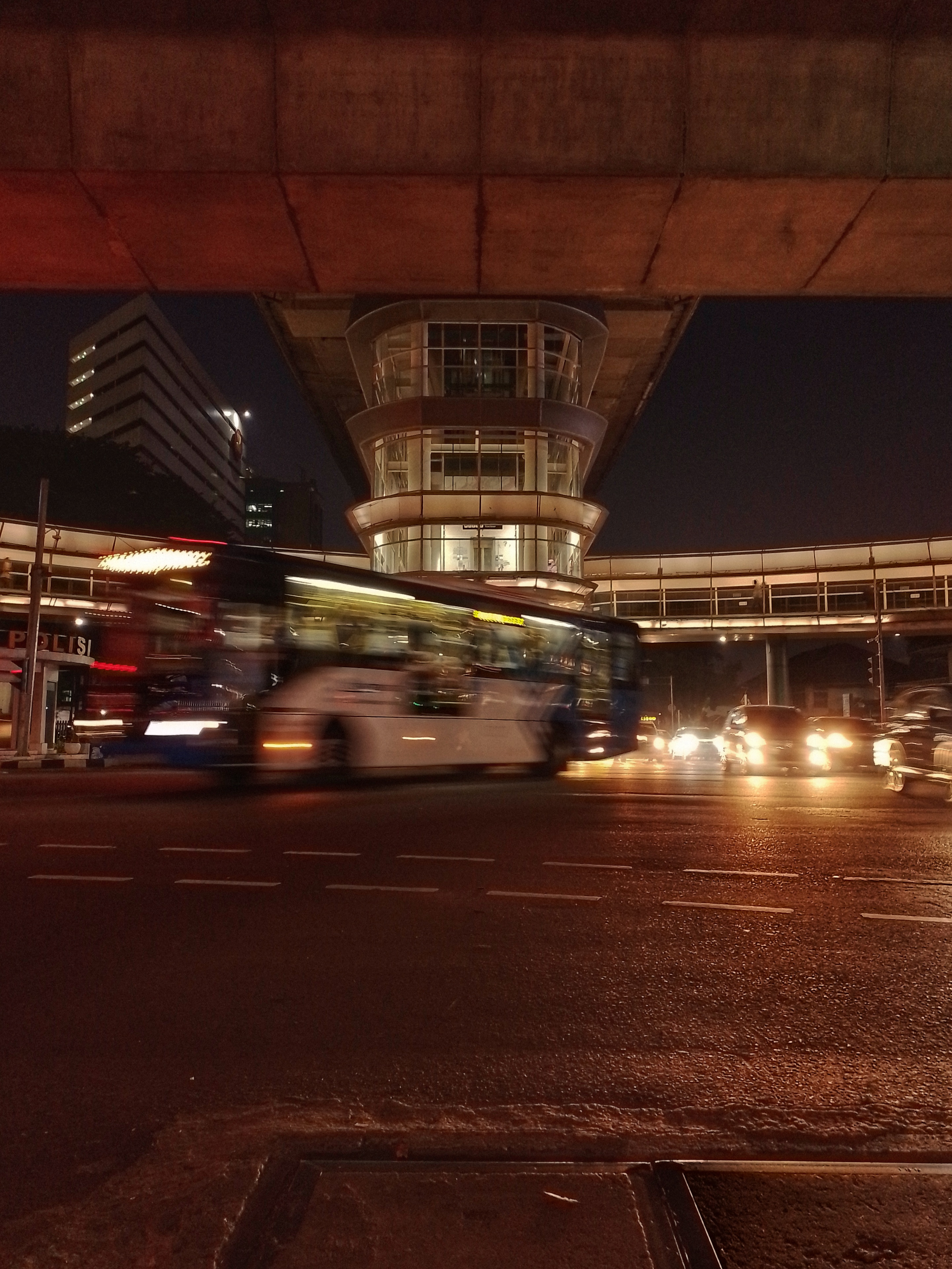
Transjakarta bus passing the ASEAN Bus station which is located at the east of the transit hub
