= Tegal Mampang (Transjakarta) =

Bus rapid transit station in Jakarta, Indonesia

13 01 Tegal Mampang
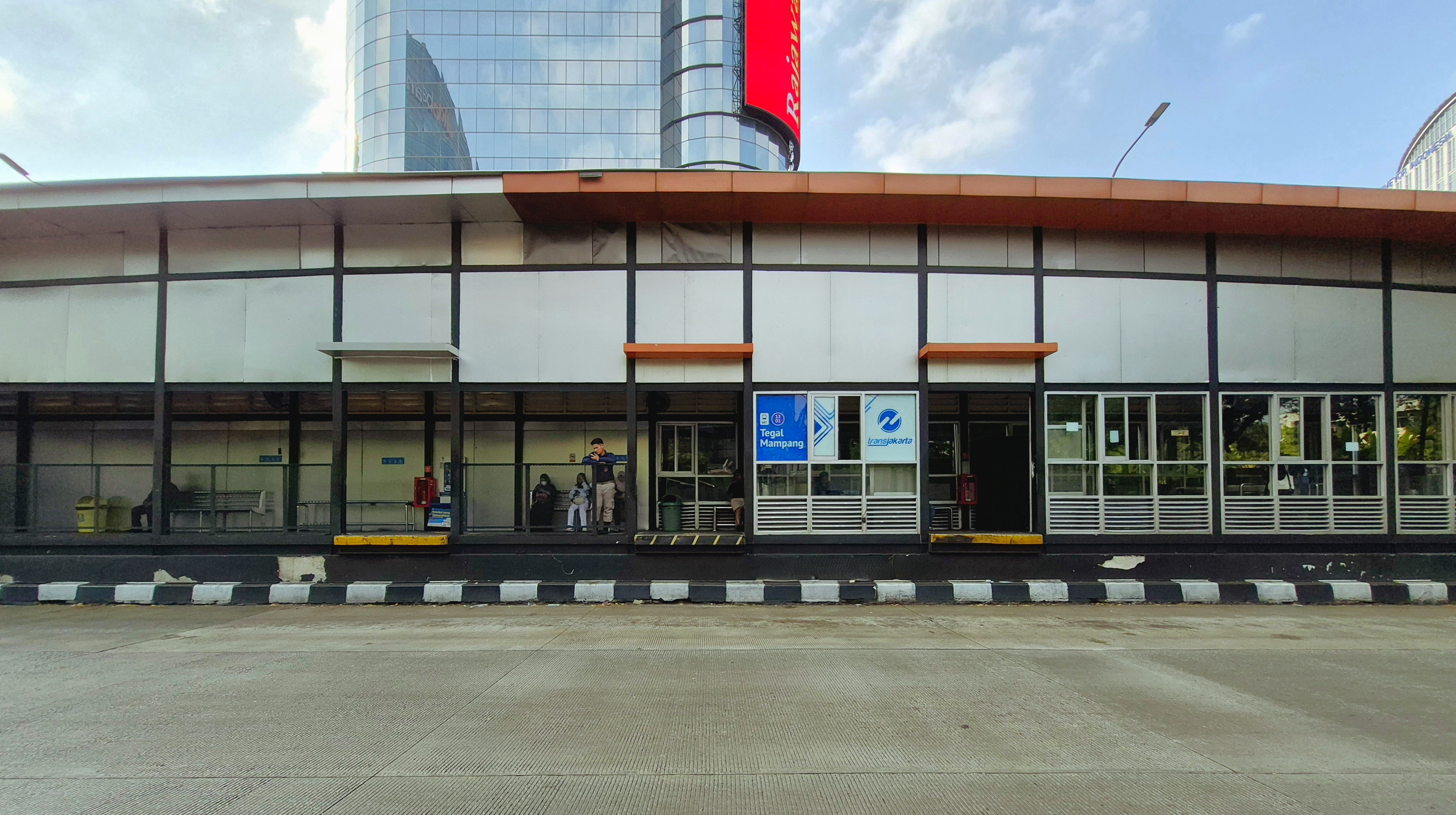

General information
- Location: Kapten Tendean Street, Mampang Prapatan, Mampang Prapatan, South Jakarta 12790, Indonesia
- Coordinates: 6.240215°S 106.831074°E
- System: Transjakarta bus rapid transit station
- Owner: Transjakarta
- Operator: Transjakarta
- Lines: List of TransJakarta corridors#Cross-corridor routes List of TransJakarta corridors#Corridor 13
- Platforms: Single side platform

Construction
- Structure type: At-grade
- Cycle facilities: No

Other information
- Status: In service

History
- Opened: 13 August 2017
- Rebuilt: 20 August 2023; 3 years ago (after fire incident)
- Former names: Tendean

Services
Preceding		Following
Mampang Prapatan towards Ragunan	Corridor 6 Route 6V	Rawa Barat towards Senayan Bank Jakarta
Rawa Barat towards CBD Ciledug	Corridor 13 Terminus; 05:00-22:00	Terminus
Rawa Barat towards Puri Beta 2	Corridor 13 Terminus; 22:00-05:00	Terminus
Rawa Barat towards Puri Beta 2	Corridor 13 Route 13B	Pancoran One-way operation
Rawa Barat towards Puri Beta 2	Corridor 13 Route 13E Only available on weekends	Underpass Kuningan One-way operation
CSW 1 towards Puri Beta 2	Corridor 13 Route L13E Only available on weekdays	Underpass Kuningan One-way operation
Location

Tegal Mampang (formerly Tendean) is a Transjakarta bus rapid transit station located on Kapten Tendean Street, Mampang Prapatan, Mampang Prapatan, South Jakarta, Indonesia. It is the eastern terminus of Corridor 13 and located at the eastern end of the corridor's elevated track, being one of the five stations built at-grade.

The station is technically located near Tegal Parang station that serves Corridor 9. However, there is no paid transfer access to that station, and passengers are required to exit this station, cross the street, and enter that station, which requires paying again.

== History ==
During the initial planning period of Corridor 13 in 2014, the BRT station was initially named Trans TV, named after the headquarters of a television network of the same name, which is part of Trans Media subsidiary of CT Corp, to the southwest. Sometime later, the station was renamed to Tendean after the street of its location. Tendean BRT station was opened on 13 August 2017, three days before the inauguration of Corridor 13.

In January 2024, the station was renamed Tegal Mampang in an effort to neutralise station names on the network from incidental usage of commercial brands and names of historic figures, in this case Captain Pierre Tendean (1939-1965), an Indonesian national hero. The new name is an amalgamation of names from the two subdistricts bordering each other near the station, Tegal Parang and Mampang Prapatan.

== Building and layout ==
The station has six bus bays, numbered A to F on a side platform facing the south. The important thing to note is that 6V buses serve the station in both directions, but northbound buses stop at the frontmost three doors (D-E-F) while southbound buses stop at doors A-B-C.

North
Side platform, doors open on the right
South	← (Rawa Barat/CSW 1)	towards Senayan Bank Jakarta, towards CBD Ciledug, and towards Puri Beta 2	Priority arrivals	towards Ragunan
South	↓ (Mampang Prapatan)	towards Senayan Bank Jakarta, towards CBD Ciledug, and towards Puri Beta 2	Priority arrivals	towards Ragunan

== Non-BRT bus services ==
Type	Route	Destination	Keterangan
Transjakarta non-BRT		Pulo Gadung—Kejaksaan Agung	Inside the station
Transjakarta non-BRT		Kampung Melayu—Ragunan	Inside the station
Transjakarta non-BRT		Pasar Minggu— Blok M via Mampang Prapatan	Inside the station
Transjakarta non-BRT		Kampung Rambutan—Blok M	Inside the station
Transjakarta non-BRT		PGC—Blok M	Outside the station
Transjakarta non-BRT		Pasar Minggu—Tanah Abang	Outside the station
Cross-border feeder (Transjabodetabek)		Bogor → Blok M	Inside the station
Royaltrans (premium)		Cibubur Junction—Kuningan	Outside the station

== Places nearby ==
- CT Corp headquarters
  - Trans Media
    - Trans TV
    - Trans7
    - CNN Indonesia
    - CNBC Indonesia
    - Transvision
    - detik.com
  - Bank Mega
- Mercure Hotel Jakarta Gatot Subroto

== Incident ==
On 14 August 2023, a fire broke out and half the station was consumed by the fire. Corridor 13 was subsequently cut short to terminate at Rawa Barat station. Investigation concluded that the fire was caused by a short-circuit at the electrical panel. (Note: Transjakarta officially claimed that the fire was caused by external factors.) During repair works, a temporary structure was built beneath the Mampang Flyover, which only served the main Corridor 13, while other services skipped the station temporarily. The renovated station reopened on 20 August 2023, and all services other than Corridor 13 began serving the station again.

== Gallery ==
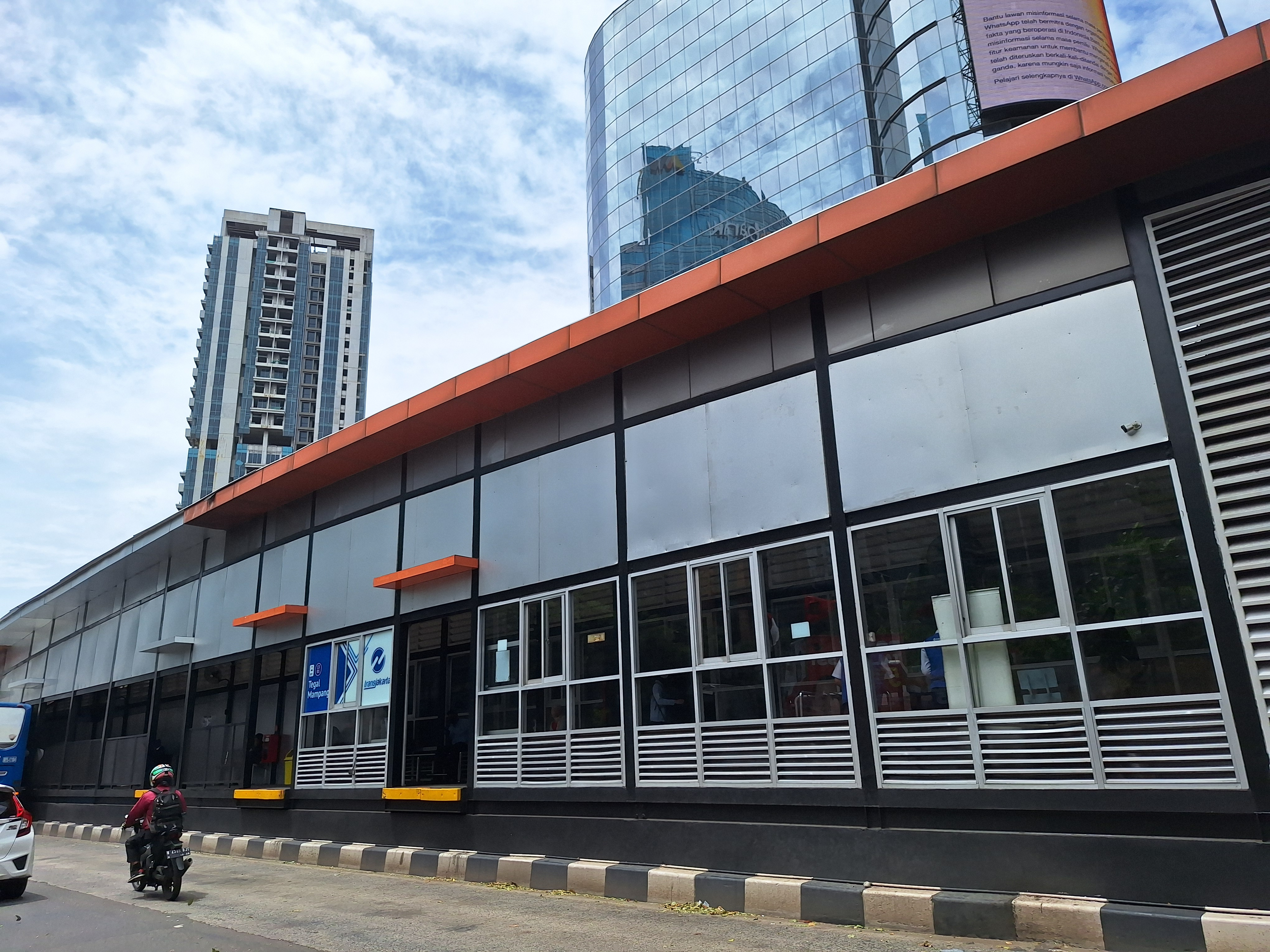
Side view of the station in January 2024. Note that the full-height platform doors and facade only covers half of the building as the remaining half were replaced by half-height black trellis after the fire incident.

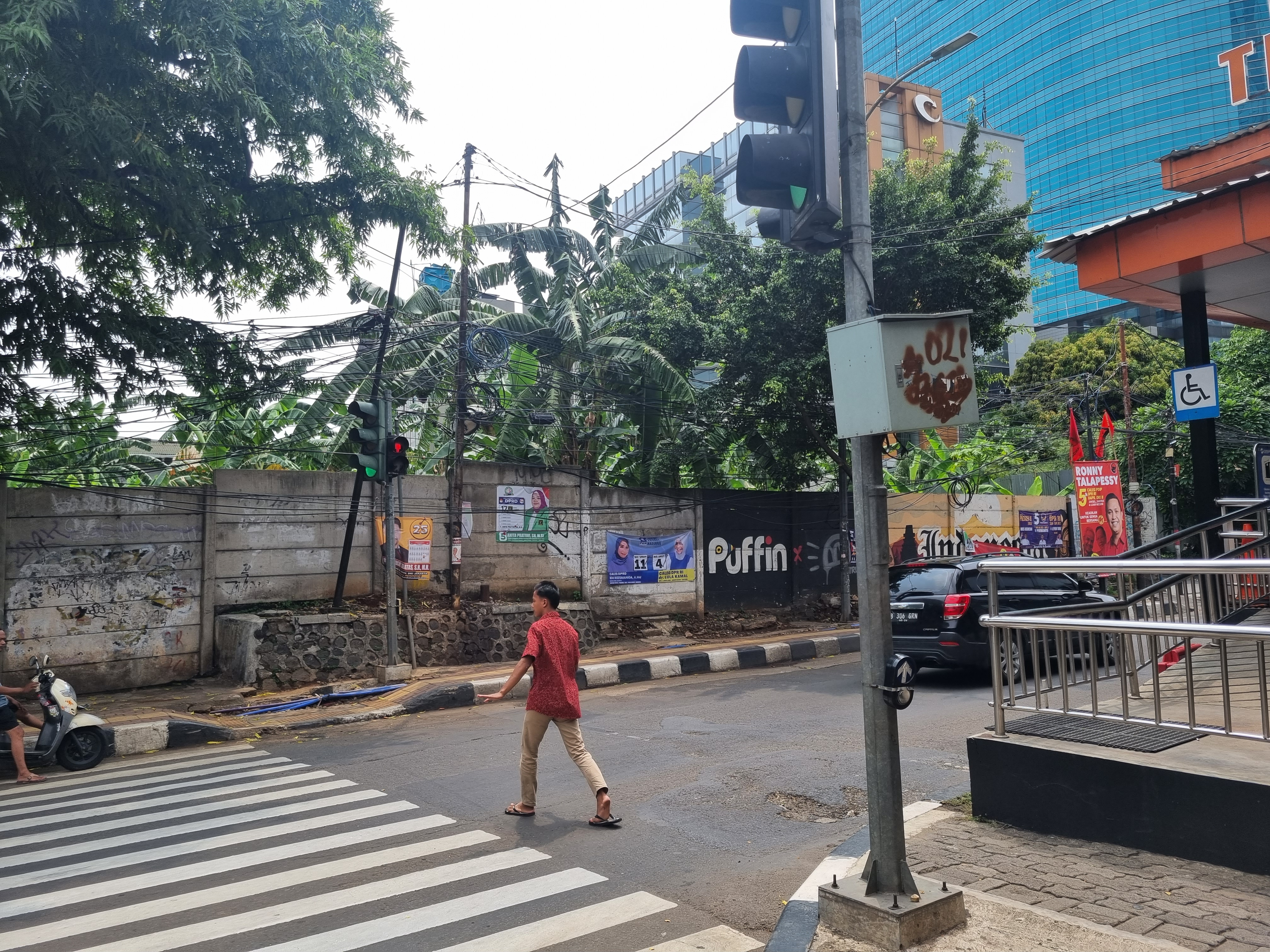
Pelican crossing to access the station, December 2023

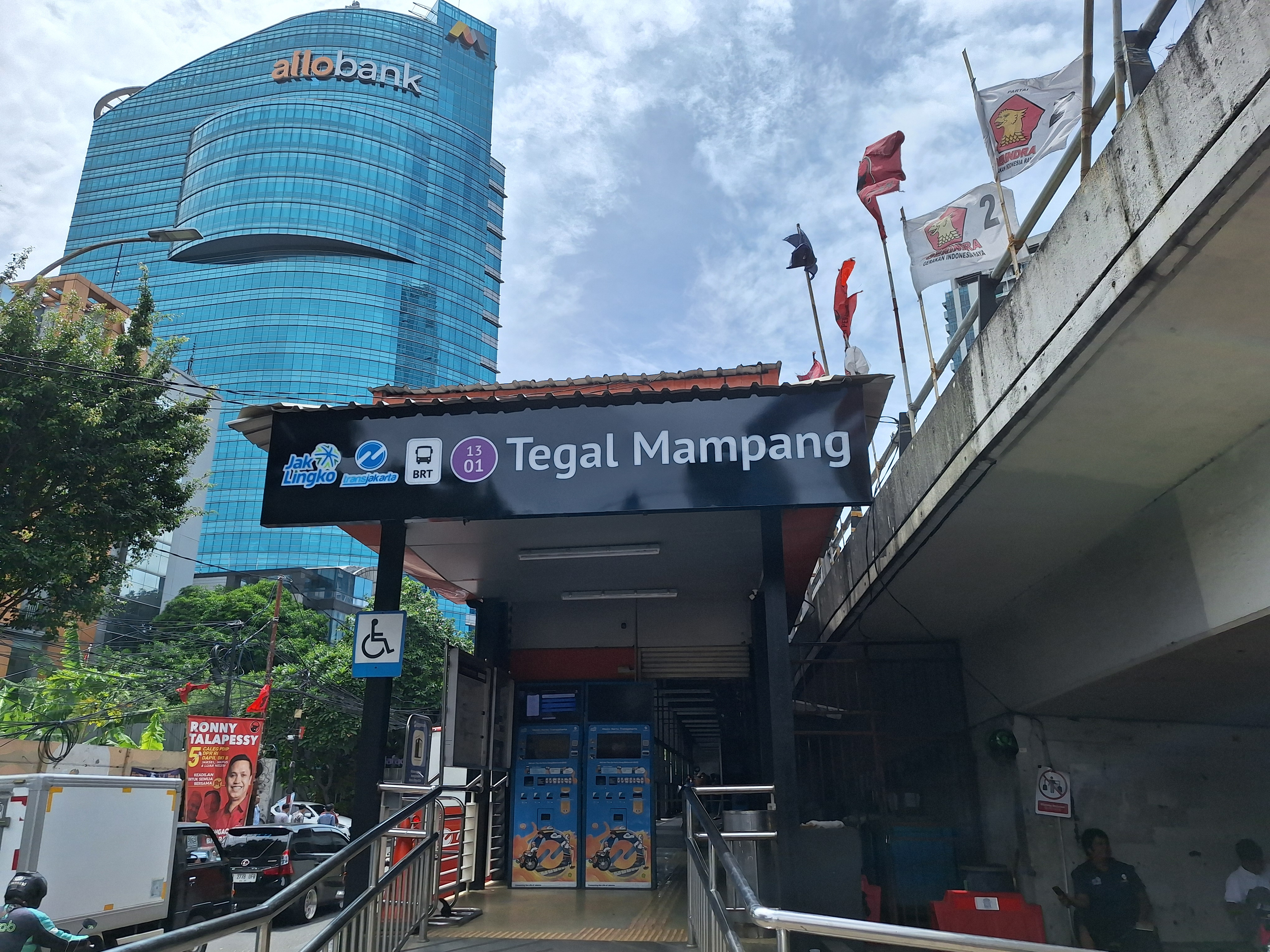
The station entrance in January 2024

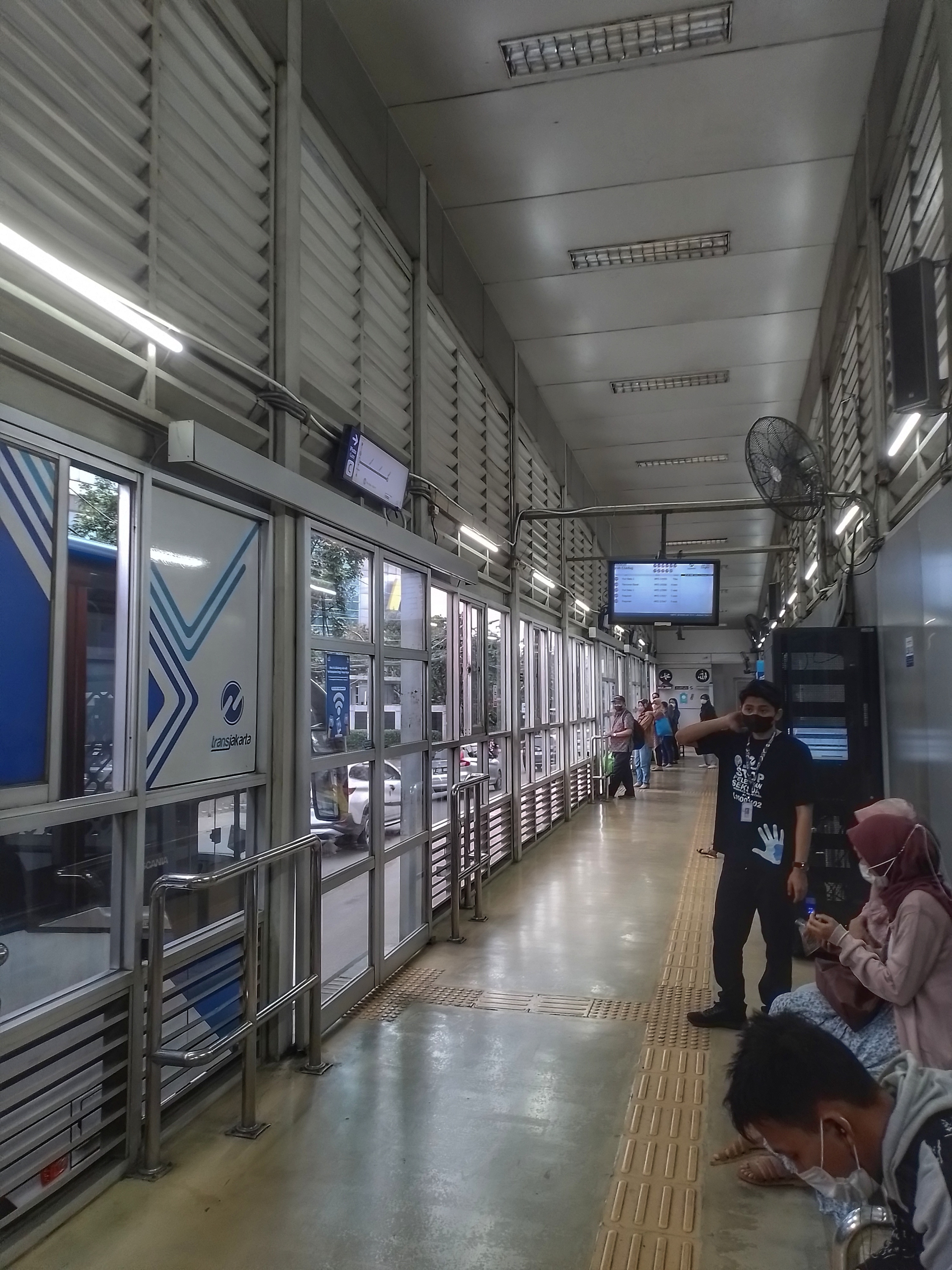
Interior of the station in February 2023, six months before the fire incident

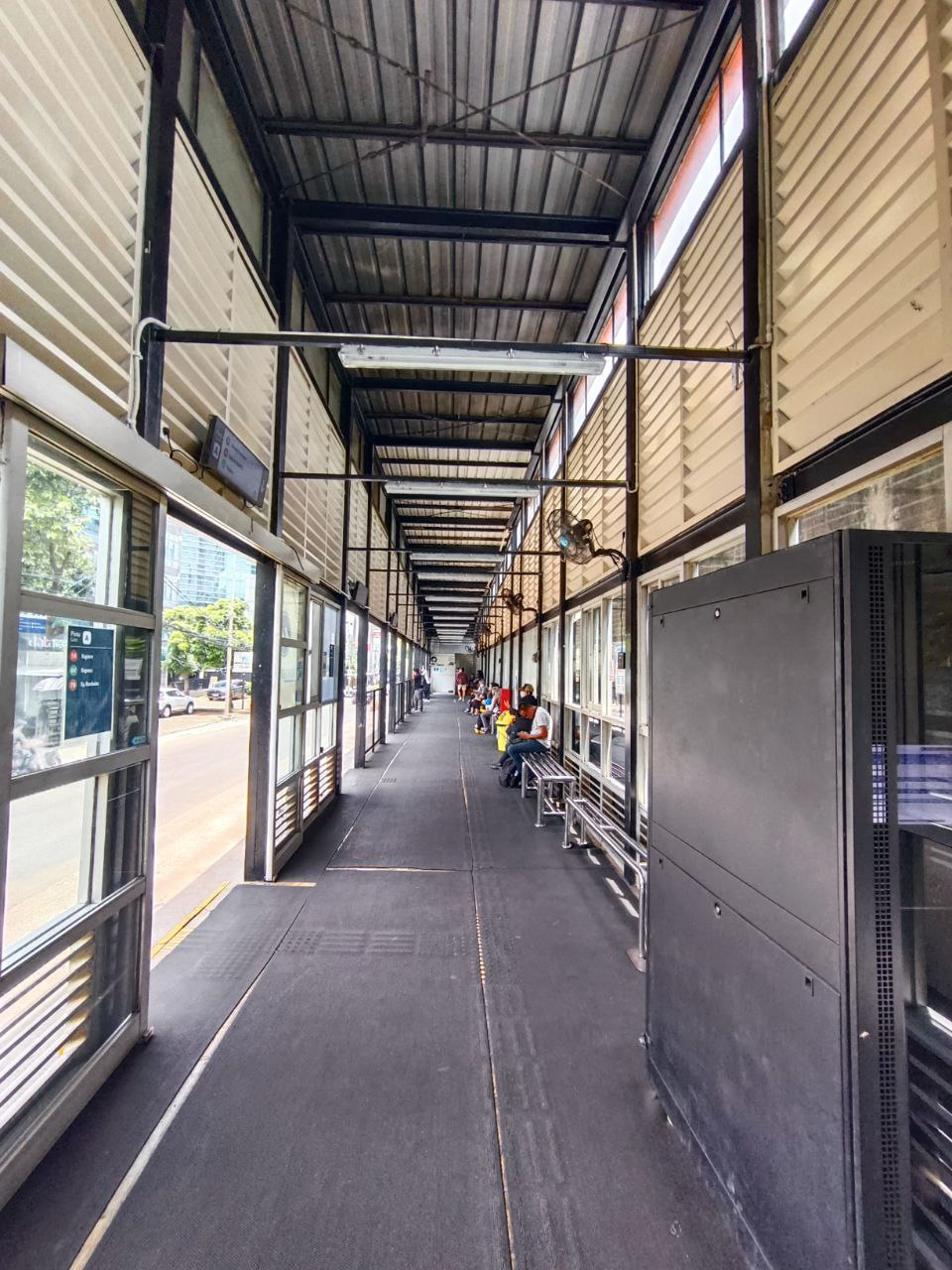
The interior seven months after the fire incident, taken in March 2024
