= ASEAN Headquarters =

Headquarters of ASEAN in Jakarta, Indonesia

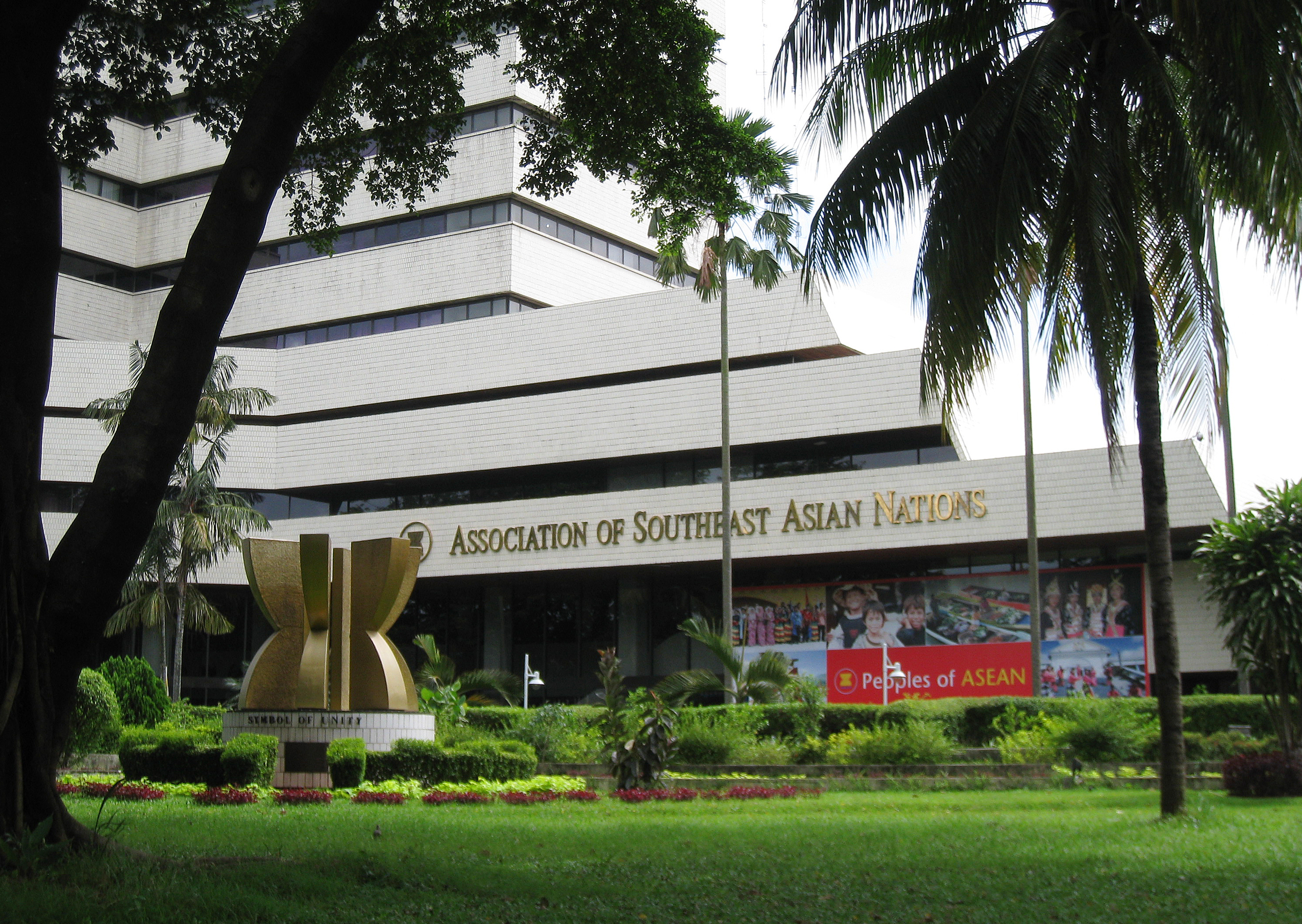
- The ASEAN Secretariat Heritage building in 2010, seen from Jalan Sisingamangaraja
- Former names: ASEAN Secretariat Building
- Alternative names: ASEC

General information
- Architectural style: Modernist; Contemporary
- Location: Jalan Sisingamangaraja No.70A, South Jakarta, Jakarta, Indonesia
- Coordinates: 6°14′21″S 106°47′58″E
- Current tenants: Seat of the ASEAN Secretariat and Inter-Parliamentary Assembly
- Construction started: April 1978
- Inaugurated: May 9, 1981
- Renovated: 2018‒2019 (twin towers)
- Cost: Rp 5 billion

Height
- Height: 39.8 m (131 ft) (original); ~70 m (twin towers)

Design and construction
- Architect: Soejoedi Wirjoatmodjo
- Architecture firm: Gubah Laras

Renovating team
- Architects: Hengky Pramudya; Aryo Widyatmiko
- Renovating firm: Bentara Indonesia Arsitek

Other information
- Public transit: CSW ASEAN MRT Station (North–South Line)

Website
- asean.org

The ASEAN Headquarters, formerly known as the ASEAN Secretariat Building, serves as the headquarters of the Association of Southeast Asian Nations (ASEAN), located on Jalan Sisingamangaraja in Kebayoran Baru, South Jakarta, Indonesia. It houses the ASEAN Secretariat, the ASEAN Inter-Parliamentary Assembly, and the organization's permanent administrative offices. It functions as the central venue for regional meetings and diplomatic coordination among the bloc's eleven member states. The complex consists of the original 1981 Secretariat Building, designed by Indonesian architect Soejoedi Wiroatmodjo, and the 2019 twin-tower expansion, designed by Bentara Indonesia Arsitek. The original structure, inaugurated by President Soeharto, is an eight-storey modernist edifice whose terraced form was inspired by the region's terraced rice paddies.

In 2019, the Secretariat complex was expanded with the addition of twin 16-storey towers featuring a record-setting 41-metre column-free skybridge, which greatly expanded the organization's capacity to host meetings and support its growing administrative functions. The Secretariat building plays a central role in ASEAN's operations, diplomacy, and community-building efforts, and has hosted numerous high-level events since its inauguration.

== History ==
=== Planning ===
==== Site ====
The idea of establishing a permanent ASEAN Secretariat emerged as ASEAN's activities expanded in the 1970s. At the first ASEAN Summit in Bali (February 1976), the ASEAN Foreign Ministers agreed to create a permanent ASEAN Secretariat to improve coordination, and crucially decided that its seat would be in Jakarta, Indonesia. Notably, the selection of Jakarta was preceded by debate. Indonesia had early on offered Jakarta as the Secretariat's home: by 3 May 1974, Indonesian Foreign Minister Adam Malik announced that a plot of land in Kebayoran Baru (at the junction of Jalan Sisingamangaraja, Kyai Maja, and Trunojoyo streets) was set aside for an ASEAN Secretariat headquarters, an area historically known as "CSW" (Centraal Speciaalwerken), a former Dutch industrial yard turned into a government district.

However, the Philippines soon challenged the plan. President Ferdinand Marcos directly proposed Manila as an alternate site, even earmarking a location on Roxas Boulevard. Adding that the Philippines were fully committed to the funding of the ASEAN Secretariat for the course of the first two years, going as far as formulating a government budget plan for the building. Deadlock on the proposed site between the two nations came to a head at an ASEAN Foreign Ministers’ Meeting in Jakarta at the Borobudur Hotel in May 1974, where the members discussed the competing offers. However, neither nations nor the foreign ministers had led to consensus.

Consensus was finally reached at the First ASEAN Summit on 23 February 1976 after ASEAN's foreign ministers held preference towards Jakarta as the centre for ASEAN's Secretariat. ASEAN held preference towards Indonesia as the host, given its size, central geography among the original members, and held diplomatic sway and stature in Southeast Asia. Its capital Jakarta was also seen as a neutral, centrally located city with stability and adequate facilities to serve as ASEAN's diplomatic hub. With so, the Roxas Boulevard proposal was eventually rescinded, and the 1976 Agreement on the Establishment of the ASEAN Secretariat, signed by ASEAN's founding members, formally codified Jakarta as the host city.

==== Design ====
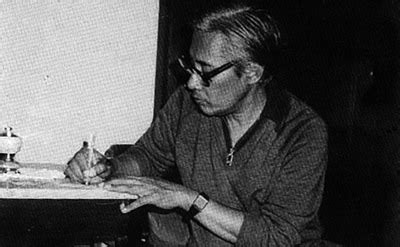
Soejoedi Wirjoatmodjo, then chief architect of Jakarta during the New Order

In July 1976, the Indonesian government announced the initial construction phase, with Rp 2.8 billion in funding from the state budget. After securing the bid for the secretariat, the Indonesian government entrusted the architectural design of the ASEAN Secretariat building to Soejoedi Wiroatmodjo. Soejoedi was a prominent and renowned figure in modernist Indonesian architecture, having been the chief architect for national projects in Jakarta. With a portfolio of designing several important government buildings such as the Conefo Organization Headquarters (which is now the Indonesian Parliament building complex) and multiple government ministry towers. His firm, Gubahlaras, was commissioned to design the ASEAN Secretariat headquarters. Likely chosen due to his reputation for blending modern design with national/regional identity; described as within a conviction of "universal humanity and the spirit of contemporariness". Planning and design work began in the mid-1970s (Soejoedi's involvement is noted around 1975.)

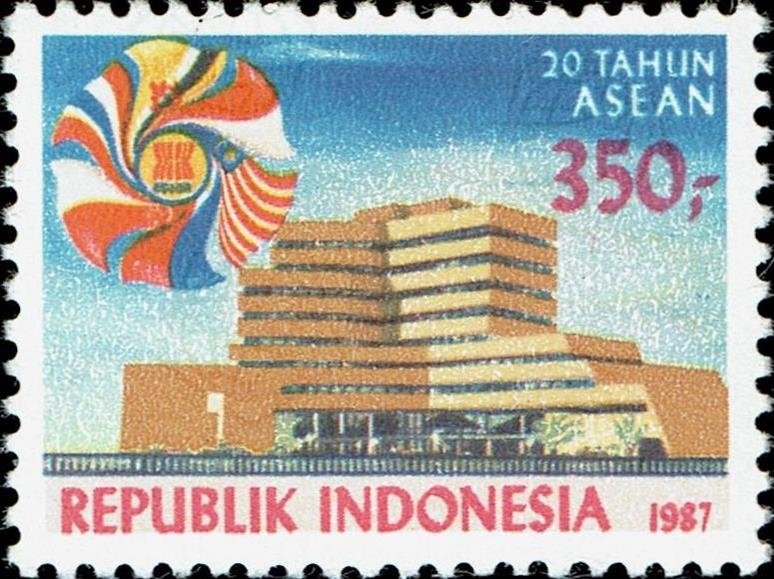
Stamp commemorating the 20th Anniversary of ASEAN, featuring the relatively new ASEAN Secretariat, 1987

The design by Soejoedi held a blend of modernist form with Southeast Asian cultural inspiration. Soejoedi eschewed overt traditional motifs; instead, he sought to express ASEAN's identity through his personal philosophy of spatial form and symbolism. Under his design philosophy, Soejoedi told Konstruksi Magazine in 1980, that his design for the building intends to embody the spirit of openness and reflected the nature of cooperation among Southeast Asian countries. The building stands 8–9 stories tall (about 39.8 meters high) with a broad, horizontal. Notably, its tiered, stepped silhouette was inspired by the terraced rice paddies common across Southeast Asia. Gubahlaras architects explicitly likened the building's layered profile to "sawah terasering" (rice terraces) as an homage to the region's agricultural heritage and a visual metaphor for ASEAN's cooperative growth. This terraced form under horizontal bands or setbacks as the building rises, was intended to reflect the agrarian foundations of ASEAN economies at the time and to symbolize growth and abundance.

Construction began in April 1978, work started on the structure using some of the same construction machinery that had been used for the Hotel Indonesia by the state-owned firm PT Pembangunan Perumahan. In November 1979, three thieves stole 10 typewriters, four calculators, a clock, and a radio from the site; they were arrested a month later, after some items had already been resold. In terms of materials and features, the original building was constructed with practicality and regional aesthetics in mind. The exterior was clad in ceramic tiles instead of paint, a choice made for durability and ease of maintenance in Jakarta's tropical climate. The windows used brown-tinted glass imported from Japan, giving the façade a distinctive bronze reflective hue while reducing glare and heat from the sun. The structure's footprint provided about 10,000 square meters of floor space across its nine levels, including a large main hall intended for meetings. Internally, the design was functional and modern by early 1980s standards, with simple geometric forms and open-plan office areas based on Soejoedi's philosophy of integrating form with function. The building's site orientation (at a prominent corner in Kebayoran Baru) was carefully considered to harmonize with its surroundings.

=== Opening ===
Inauguration of the ASEAN Secretariat Building in Jakarta, 14 May 1981.

On 9 May 1981, Indonesia's President Suharto officially inaugurated the ASEAN Secretariat Building, in a ceremony attended by the then Foreign Ministers of ASEAN member states and the original ASEAN "Big Five" founders. Prior to the inauguration, ASEAN Secretariat staff were already moved into the new building after being housed in temporary offices at Indonesia's Foreign Affairs Ministry compound on Jalan Taman Pejambon while ground preparations and design finalization for the new building continue. At the inauguration, President Suharto remarked that the ASEAN Secretariat building stood as "the unwavering determination of the 250 million people of the five ASEAN member countries to unite." The opening of the new ASEC headquarters was followed by the celebration of ASEAN's 52nd anniversary, which included a series of community-based commemoration activities. The festival intended to show ASEAN's inclusivity and youthfulness.

In a joint communiqué issued in Manila in June 1981, the foreign ministers of ASEAN states declared that the new headquarters marked a new chapter for ASEAN cooperation. The cost overrun for the ASEAN Secretariat totalled up to Rp 5 billion rupiah. The building quickly became the venue for significant ASEAN events. Its first major outing was for Brunei Darussalam's accession to become ASEAN's sixth member in January 1984 (ASEAN's first expansion beyond the original five), signed and deposited in the Secretariat in Jakarta.

==== Proposals for expansion ====
Initially, the headquarters in Jakarta served the modest administrative needs of its Secretariat. However, as ASEAN expanded in complexity and membership (from 5 to 11 states) in the decades after the ASEAN Charter (2008) and especially leading up to the launch of the ASEAN Community in 2015, the original building became increasingly inadequate for the organization's much larger diplomatic, administrative, and representational functions. The expansion discourse emerged around 2012, when the Indonesian and ASEAN governments discussed utilizing the former unused South Jakarta Mayor's office for the use of the secretariat. Governor of Jakarta, Joko Widodo, was involved in the beginning rehabilitation negotiations. The land grant was approved in 2014 during the governorship of Basuki Tjahaja Purnama, known colloquially as Ahok. At the time of transfer, a debate emerged over whether the ASEAN Secretariat should renovate the existing South Jakarta mayoral building or construct a new facility on the site. Ahok, a strong proponent of expanding the organization's capacity in Jakarta, advocated and proposed the building of a new structure to meet ASEAN's long-term needs, going as far as to send an assessment team to evaluate the building's feasibility for use under minimal renovations or the necessity for rebuilding.

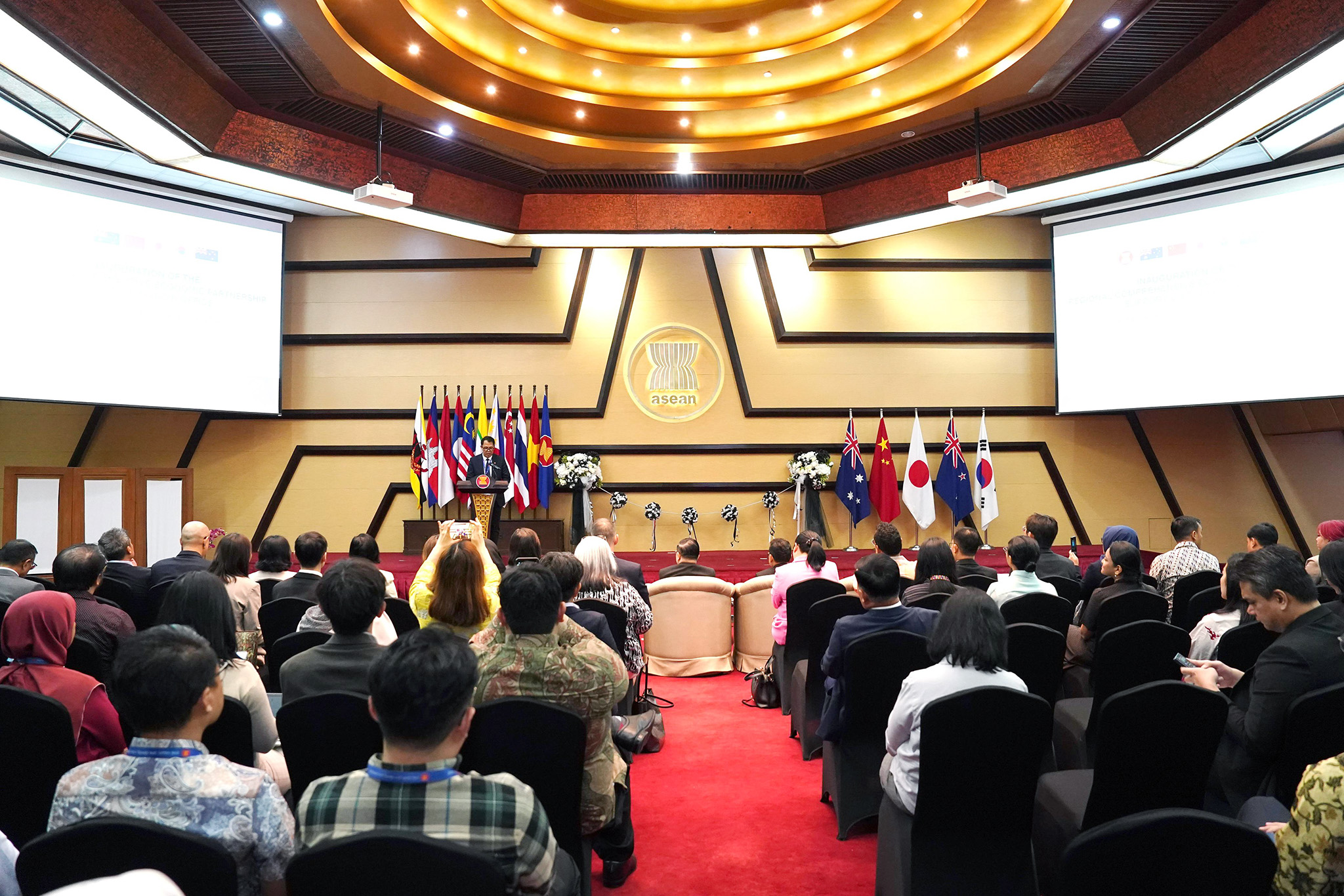
ASEAN Heritage Building meeting room

By 2015, the aging secretariat was in need for a new, larger, modern, and symbolic headquarters that could accommodate the permanent missions, meeting facilities, and staff that accompanied ASEAN's deeper institutionalization. This context led to an open architectural design competition in 2015, coordinated with professional bodies such as the Indonesian Institute of Architects (Ikatan Arsitek Indonesia; IAI), drawing entries proposing a landmark complex for the secretariat, with 80 competing entries submitted to the competition. The competition was organized with the Indonesian Institute of Architects (IAI) Jakarta, with Ministry of Foreign Affairs and ASEAN involvement; IAI channels also posted the jurying and winners. The criteria set for the building were the creation of a landmark building that architect juror Hengky Pramudya represents the spirit of the ASEAN organisation in the global community. Another important design criterion was energy-efficiency, maximal utilisation of natural lighting and ventilation (given the tropical climate of Jakarta). The area sighted for the proposed building site was identified as being in the Jalan Trunojoyo (South Jakarta) area, on a former site of the South Jakarta mayor's office.

On 16 November, the winning proposal was eventually announced by the IAI, with and team (Bentara Indonesia Arsitek) won First Prize in the 2015 design competition for the new ASEAN Secretariat. The award was announced on 23 December 2015. The winners were then gifted a sum of Rp. 500 million on behalf of the ASEAN Organization.

On the occasion of the 49th anniversary of the ASEAN Declaration on 8 August 2016, Indonesian Foreign Minister Retno Marsudi publicly announced plans to expand the ASEAN Secretariat. Initially, the project envisioned a 17-storey building with two semi-basement levels, with construction scheduled to begin in early 2017 and to be completed by the end of 2018. The winning competition design was subsequently developed into the twin-tower ASEAN Secretariat complex.

=== 2019 Expansion ===
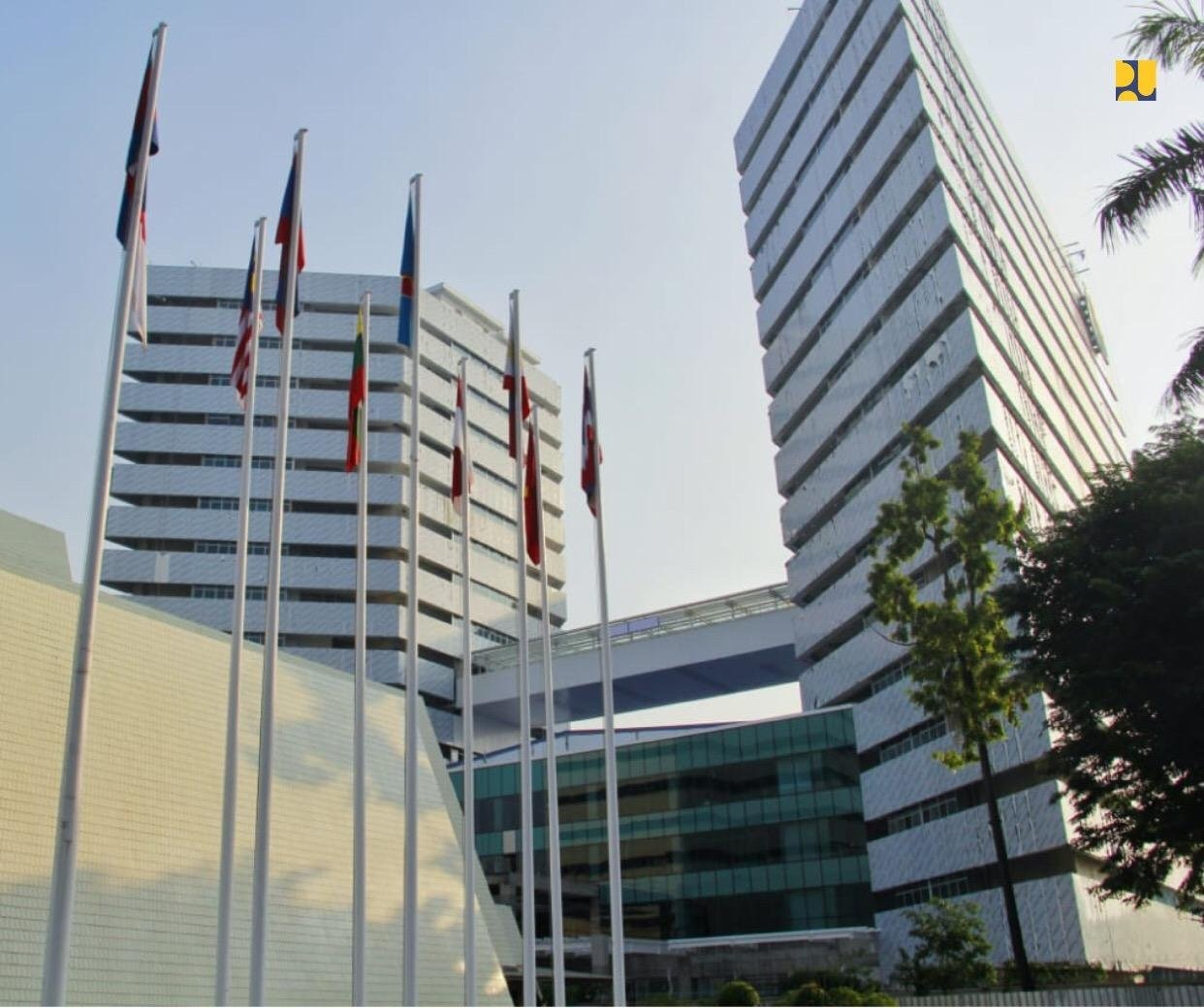
The new ASEAN Secretariat building in South Jakarta, later inaugurated in 2019

In 2017, Jakarta's provincial government approved granting the former South Jakarta Mayor's Office site on Jl. Trunojoyo, Kebayoran Baru to support the ASEAN Secretariat's expansion. The grant was then formalized on 23 March 2017 as a ~1.3-hectare parcel conveyed to the then Secretary General of the Indonesian Ministry of Foreign Affairs, Kristiarto Legowo, for the Secretariat's enlargement.

Groundbreaking of the new twin-tower ASEAN Secretariat complex on the site began on 5 January 2018, with an estimated construction time of about 395 days and completion targeted for early 2019. With the cost of Rp 448,77 billion funded by the 2017–2018 State Budget, the actual days needed for construction was 549 work days, inaugurated on 8 August 2019, coinciding with the 52nd anniversary of ASEAN. The construction project for the new ASEAN Secretariat building was carried out on a 11,369 m^{2} site. The total area of the building is 49,993 m^{2}, with a structure consisting of two 16-storey towers. At the base, there is a 5-storey podium connecting the two towers, as well as 2 basement floors. The building's construction is designed to be earthquake-resistant, in accordance with modern building standards in Indonesia that can accommodate seismic risks.

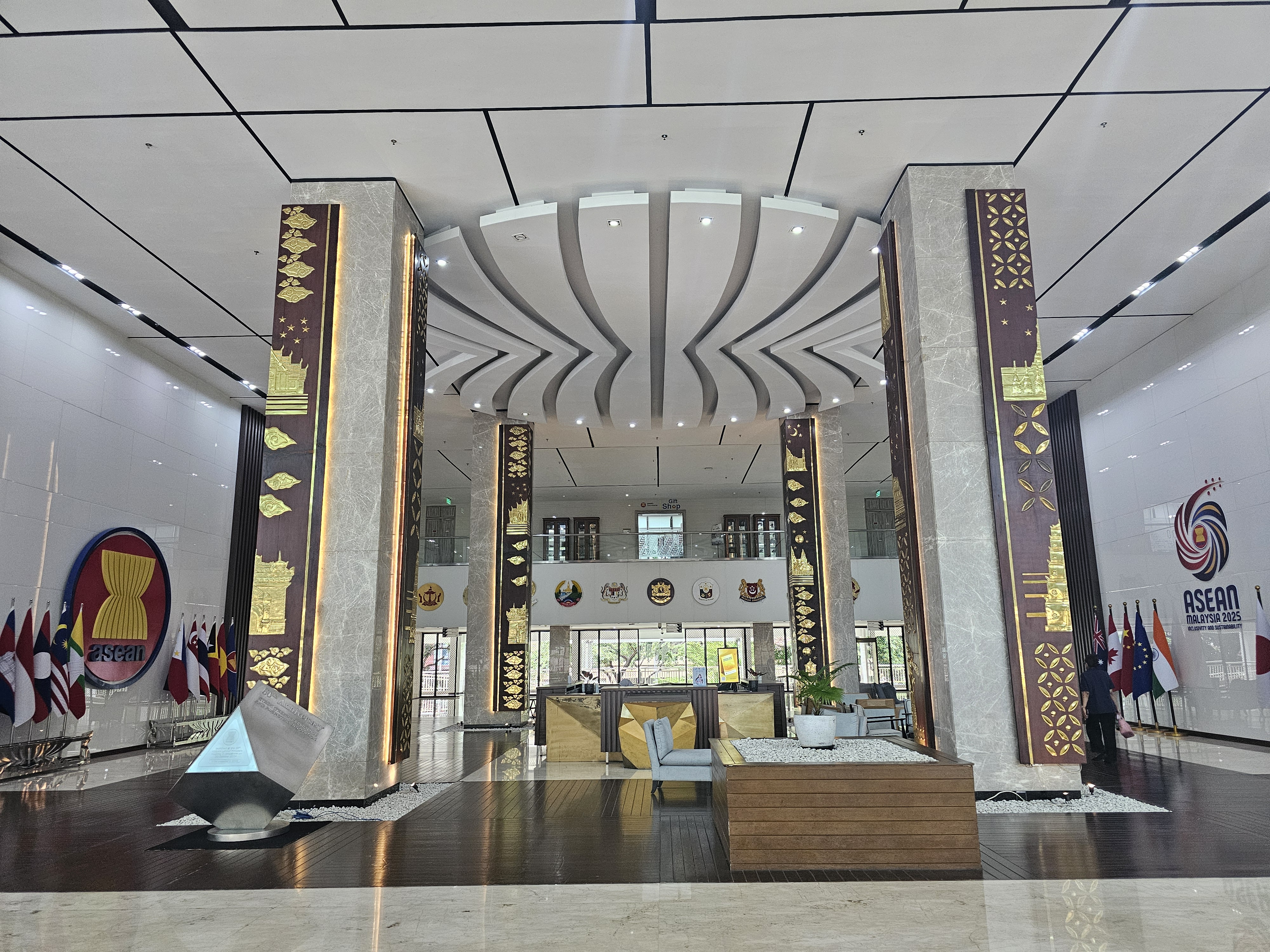
Interior of the ASEC New Lobby

One signature element of the new design is the 41-meter long suspension skybridge connecting the twin towers at an upper level. The bridge has no central support pillars, making it the longest cantilevered (column-free) bridge in Indonesia, officiated by the Indonesian World Records Museum. Indonesian Foreign Minister Retno Marsudi noted that the architecture is based on a concept of "dialogue and harmony." The bridge physically linking two towers is meant to represent ASEAN's culture of dialogue bridging differences. The architects ensured that the new towers also align aesthetically with Soejoedi's older building. Inside, the new facilities were to enhance ASEAN's operational capacity. The complex boasts 30 meeting rooms, including a dedicated conference room, named the "country room," for each of the then 10 member states to use. Office space for the ASEAN Secretariat's staff and permanent missions of member countries is also expanded. President Jokowi had set that with this expansion, more ASEAN activities and meetings can be held at the Secretariat itself, reducing the need for costly travel, with the freed funds to be used for other work, and led to more frequent face-to-face interactions among officials. In addition to the state rooms, offices for several other ASEAN bodies/organs are also available. The meeting rooms are equipped with modern conference technology, supporting efficient meetings at the working group, committee, and ministerial levels in Jakarta. The building also features representative multipurpose halls (including the Nusantara Hall), an exhibition area (ASEAN Gallery), and a cafe (the ASEAN Cafe),

Environmentally, the complex was designed as a green building, certified as "Platinum" by the Green Building Council Indonesia, under the highest rating for energy efficiency and eco-friendly design. Climate control strategies are used; for example, the lobby is naturally ventilated (with no air conditioning) and as the interior is maintained at about 25 °C for comfort without excessive energy use. In addition to energy efficiency, the building is also equipped with water-saving features, a maximum daylighting system, and environmentally friendly materials. This green design concept has earned the new ASEAN Secretariat Building MURI recognition for the building category with the highest green standards. PUPR Minister Basuki Hadimuljono added that the building would receive a Certificate of Functional Worthiness (SLF) upon completion, indicating that all technical and safety aspects have been met according to regulations. The expanded grounds and the lobby area serve as a venue for ASEAN Day celebrations and community events. Aside from community events, only the ASEAN Gallery and the ASEC resource centre (ASEAN library) is open for the public within ASEAN premises, with a day early appointment being necessary.

== Art collection ==
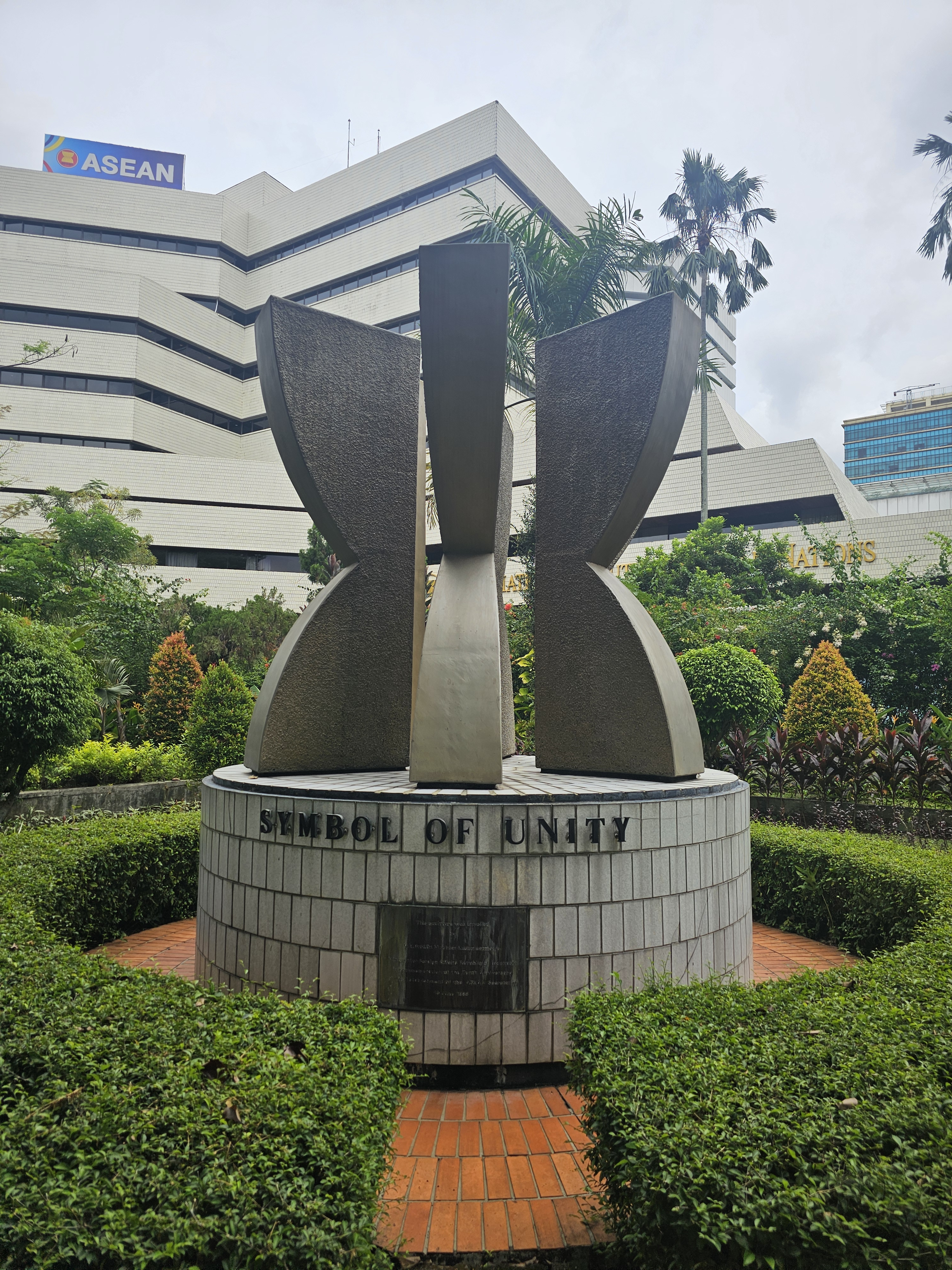
ASEAN Symbol of Unity statue

ASEAN Gallery is a permanent art space inside the ASEAN Secretariat headquarters. The space host a gallery of Southeast Asian sculptures, paintings, monuments, and memorials to commemorate the organization and Southeast Asia as a whole, donated to ASEAN by member states, dialogue partners, as well as private companies, foundations and individual artists. The gallery was inaugurated on 8 August 2001, timed deliberately to coincide with ASEAN Day and the organisation's 34th anniversary, intended to show ASEAN's history, culture and achievements whilst also promoting Southeast Asian studies. The Gallery also functions as a venue for curated, time-bound exhibitions by artists.

ASEAN also runs the ASEAN Artists Residency Programme, which brings artists from across Southeast Asia to Jakarta as a way to offer a platform for artists to develop their practice and gain exposure. Prestigious in the SEA artisan community, residency calls and final presentations are often held on-site at the Gallery, with artists required to present at least one substantial work (painting, print, or similar) at the end of their stay. The works produced are to become part of the ASEAN Gallery's permanent collection.

== Transportation ==
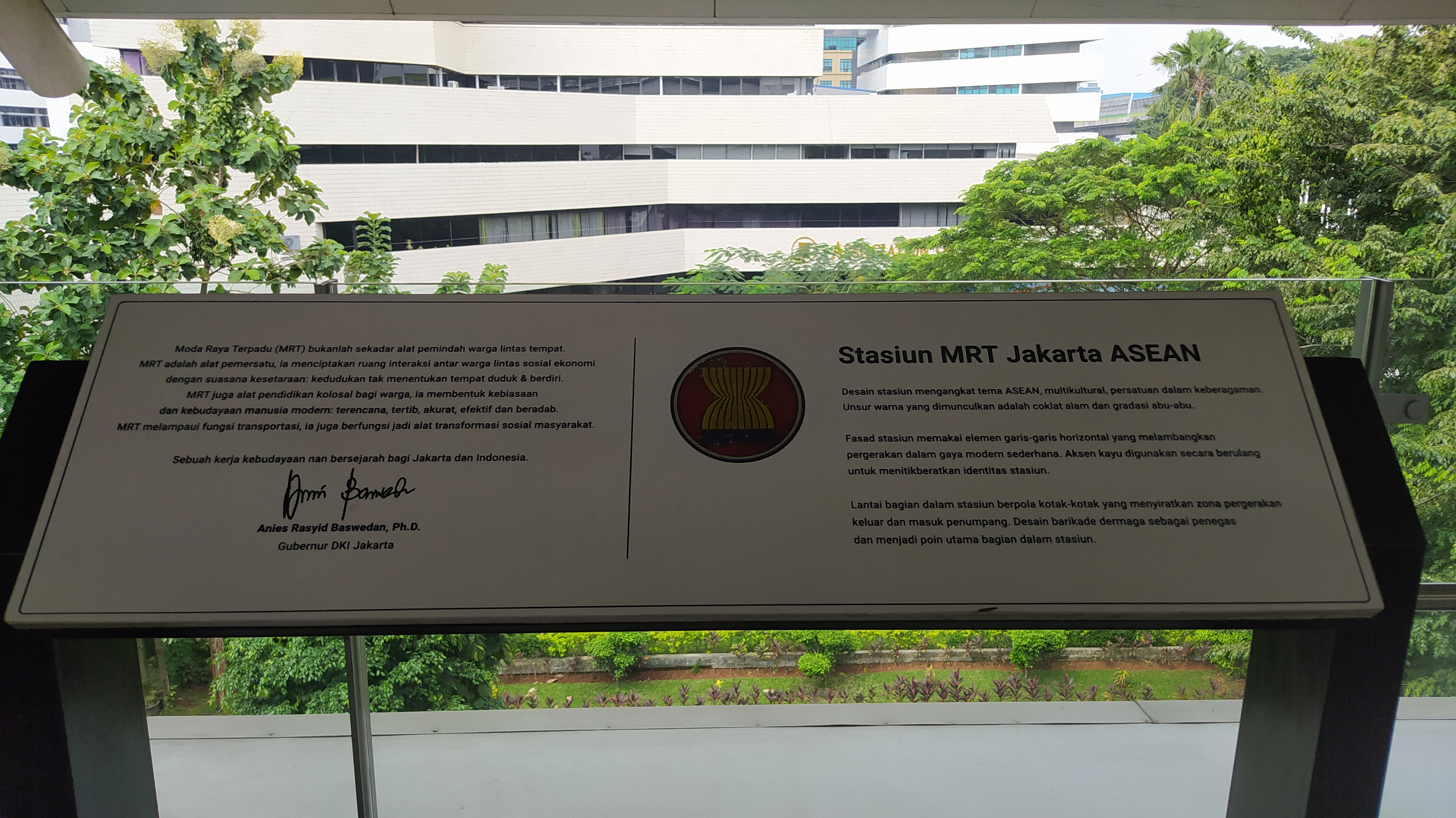
A placcard containing message from Jakarta Governor, Anies Baswedan, and explanation of the ASEAN Headquarters MRT station design

The ASEAN Secretariat headquarters in Kebayoran Baru, South Jakarta, is directly served by ASEAN MRT Station on the North–South Line, renamed from "Sisingamangaraja" because of its proximity to the complex and in honor of the organization. The site is part of the CSW–ASEAN transit-oriented development, which links the MRT station with TransJakarta Corridor 13 via an elevated pedestrian bridge, giving seamless transfers to other BRT routes that stop around the junction. Its design embraces a theme of Unity in Diversity and multiculturalism, reflecting the spirit of ASEAN, with exterior elements like horizontal lines symbolizing movement and interior touches meant to spotlight accessibility and comfort (including tactile paving for the sight-impaired, wide gates for wheelchairs or bicycles, lifts, and plans to add more escalators).

== See also ==
- Lam Thaen Guest House ‒ Regarded as the birthplace of ASEAN
- ASEAN Sculpture Garden
- History of Jakarta
