= Bangkok Declaration =

Bangkok Declaration may refer to:

- The 1967 ASEAN Declaration
- The 1993 Bangkok Declaration on human rights
- The 1997 BIST-EC Declaration, later becomes BIMSTEC
