= ASEAN Headquarters MRT station =

MRT station in Jakarta, Indonesia

M07 ASEAN Headquarters
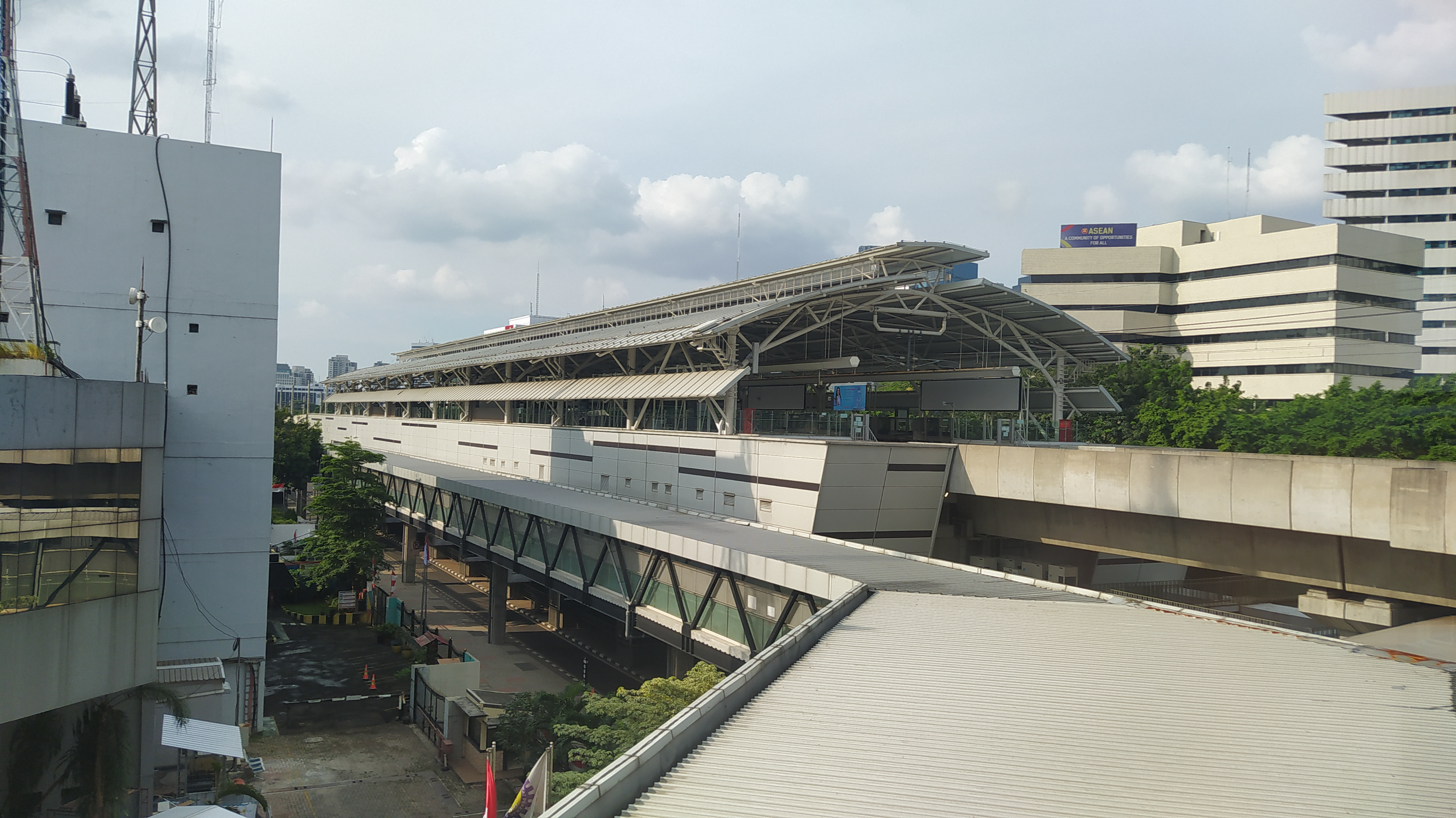
- The ASEAN station building seen from the CSW-ASEAN TOD, with the ASEAN Headquarters seen on the right

General information
- Location: Jalan Sisingamangaraja XII, Selong, Kebayoran Baru, South Jakarta; Jakarta; Indonesia
- Coordinates: 6.239085°S 106.7985954°E
- Owner: MRT Jakarta
- Operator: MRT Jakarta
- Line: North–South line
- Platforms: 2 side platforms
- Tracks: 2
- Connections: CSW-ASEAN

Construction
- Structure type: Elevated
- Parking: Available (around the station)
- Cycle facilities: n/a
- Accessible: Available

Other information
- Station code: SSM

History
- Opened: 24 March 2019; 7 years ago

Services
Preceding station	Jakarta MRT	Following station
Blok M BCA towards Lebak Bulus	North-South Line	Senayan Mastercard towards Bundaran HI Bank Jakarta
Route map
Location
- Location within Jakarta

ASEAN Headquarters Station (formerly ASEAN station and Sisingamangaraja Station) is a rapid transit station on the North-South Line of the Jakarta MRT in Jakarta, Indonesia. The station is located in the Gunung area, Kebayoran Baru, South Jakarta and is built on Jalan Sisingamangaraja XII. This station is the northernmost elevated station for the first phase of the Jakarta MRT project before entering the underground line. It is located between Senayan Mastercard and Blok M BCA stations, and has the station code SSM. The station is located not far from the Headquarters of the Association of Southeast Asian Nations. The station is connected to the CSW-ASEAN TOD for Transjakarta's Corridor 13 service via a pedestrian bridge that has been in operation since December 2021. The station has only two railroad tracks and has no switches.

== Location ==
The northernmost elevated station on the MRT, ASEAN station is located on Jl. Sisingamangaraja XII in Selong, Kebayoran Baru, South Jakarta. Nearby the station are Association of Southeast Asian Nations (ASEAN) secretariat, Indonesian National Police headquarters, Al-Azhar Great Mosque and Al-Azhar Indonesia University campus as well as government buildings such as campuses of Ministry of Agrarian Affairs and Spatial Planning (National Land Agency) and Ministry of Public Works.

== History ==
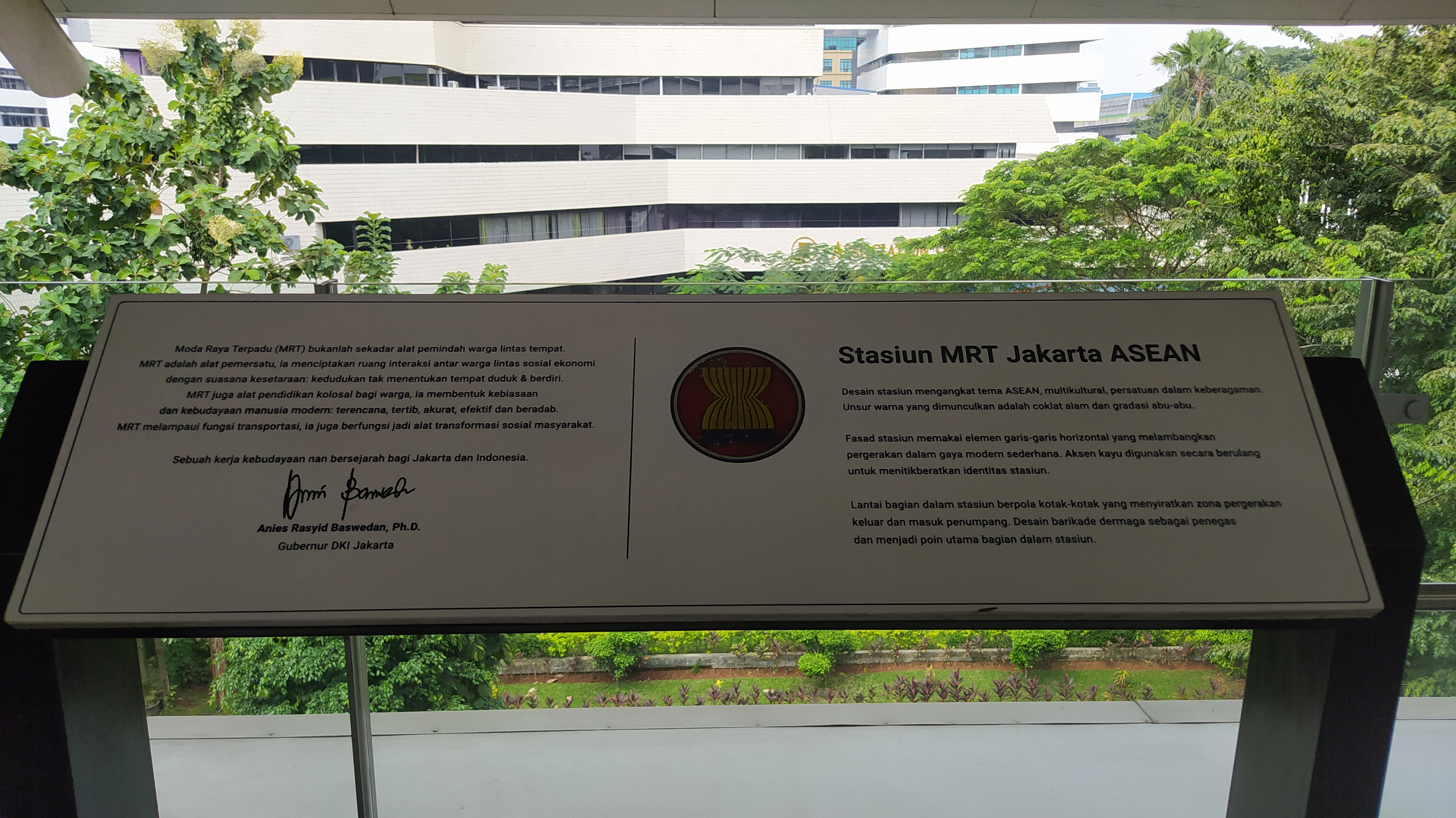
Placcard containing message from Jakarta Governor, Anies Baswedan, and explanation of the station's design and the ASEAN Organization

The station was originally named Sisingamangaraja Station (hence the station code), from the street is the station located. The name then changed to ASEAN Station due to its close location to the ASEAN Secretariat. Its name change is originally a part of MRT station naming rights, but Jakarta MRT gave the naming rights of the station to ASEAN free of charge.

ASEAN station was officially opened, along with the rest of Phase 1 of the Jakarta MRT on 24 March 2019. The connection to the TransJakarta bus rapid transit at the CSW-ASEAN TOD was opened in December 2021.

== Building plan ==
3rd floor Platform	Side platform, the doors are opened on the right side
3rd floor Platform	Platform 1	North–South Line to Lebak Bulus (←)
3rd floor Platform	Platform 2	North–South Line to Bundaran HI Bank Jakarta (→)
3rd floor Platform	Side platform, the doors are opened on the right side
2nd floor	Concourse	Ticket gates, ticket machines, counters, retail kiosks, and transfer access to the CSW-ASEAN TOD
1st floor	Street	Entrances and exits

== Gallery ==
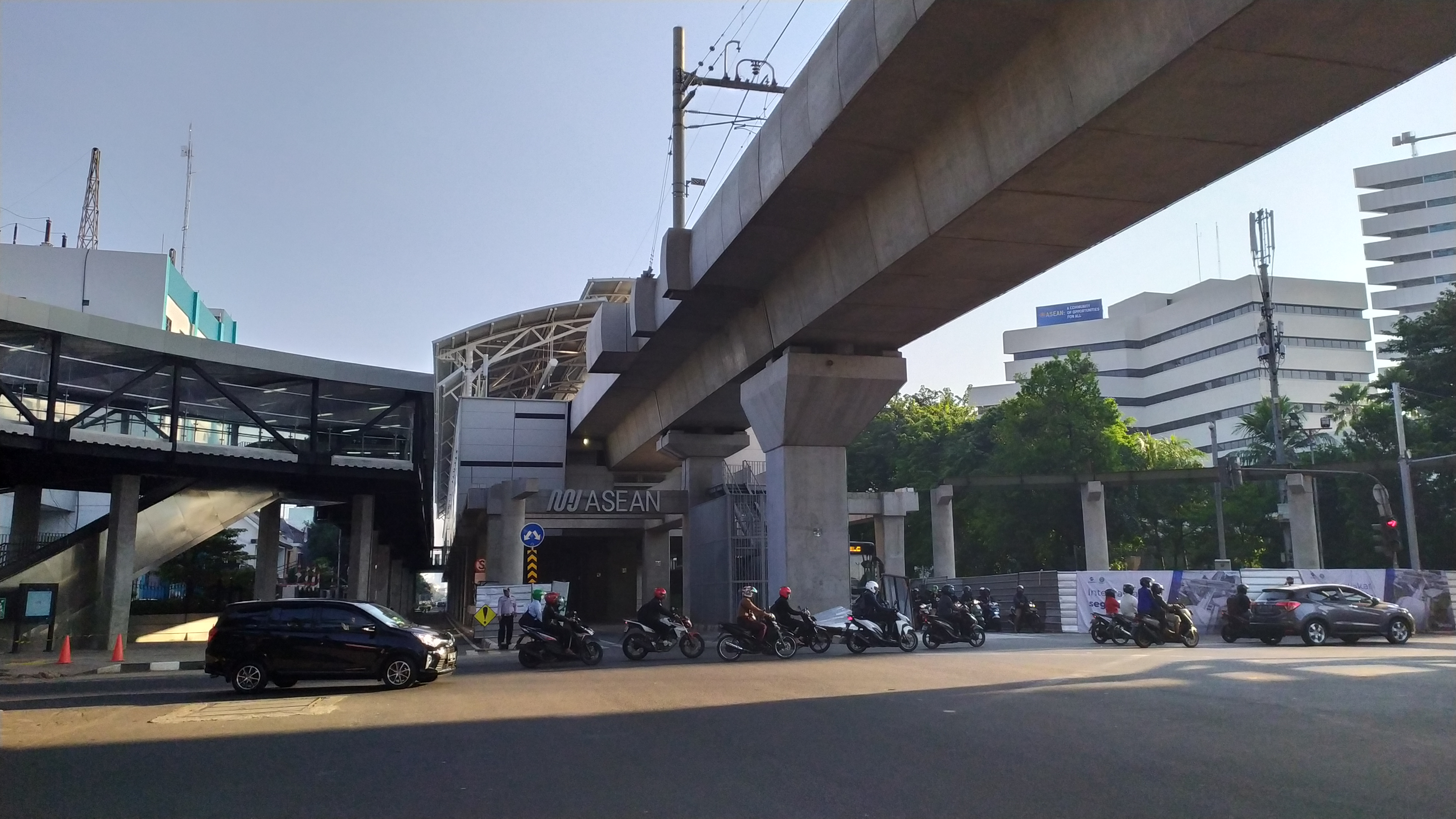
The MRT station seen from the CSW intersection, 2020

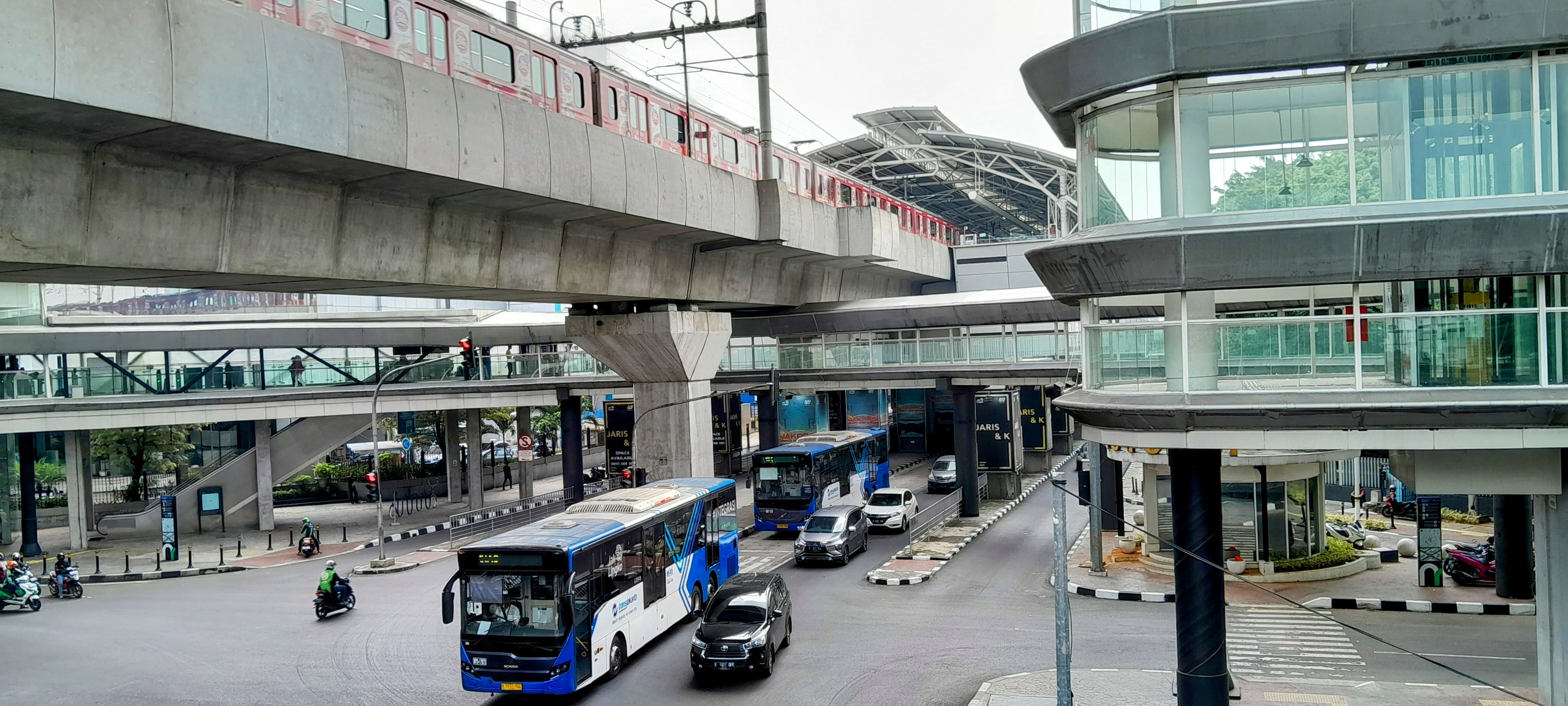
View of CSW-ASEAN Transit Oriented Development (TOD). Commuters can easily switch between the MRT and BRT systems, July 2023

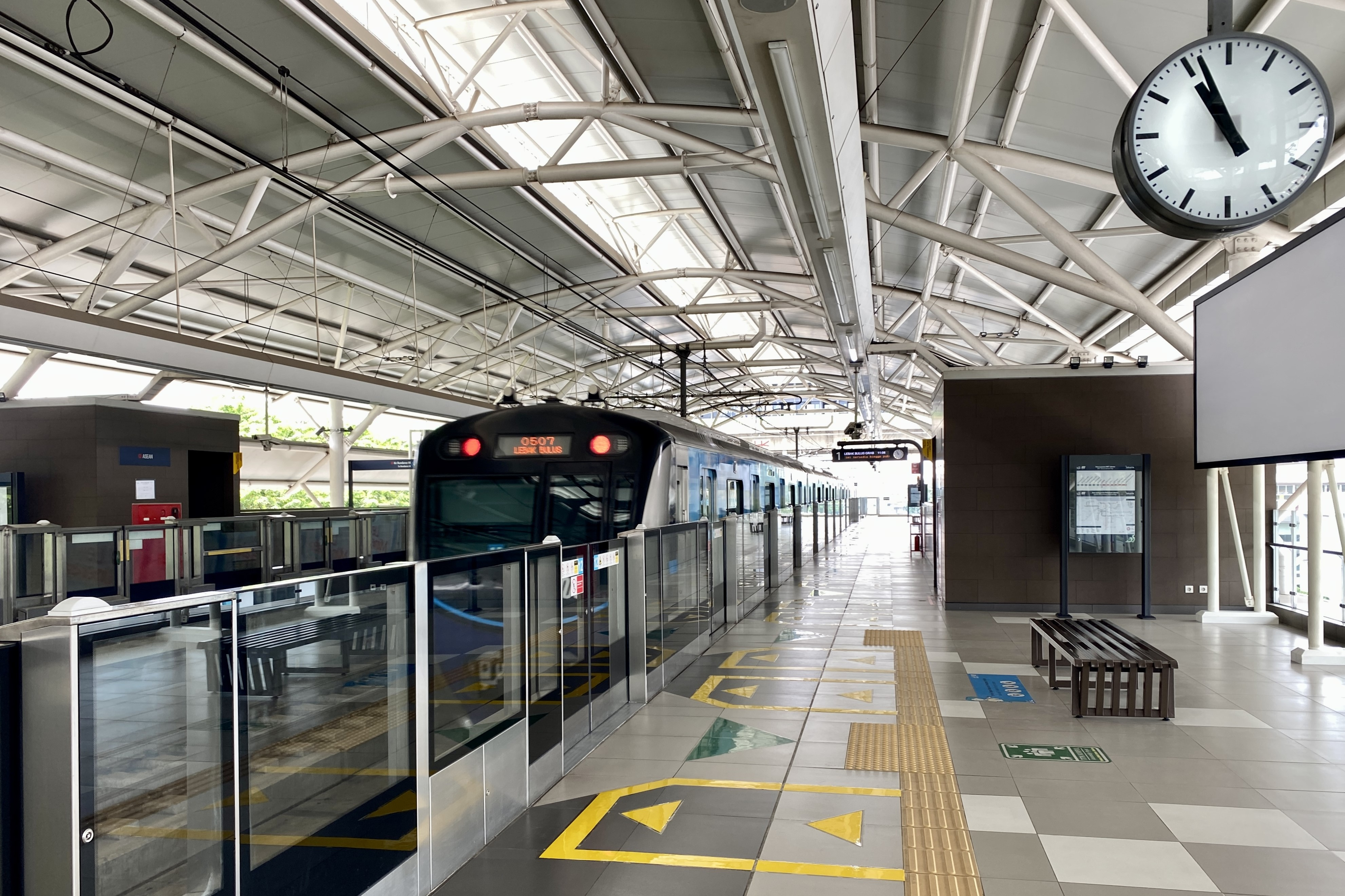
Ratangga departs at the South-bound platform of the ASEAN MRT Station

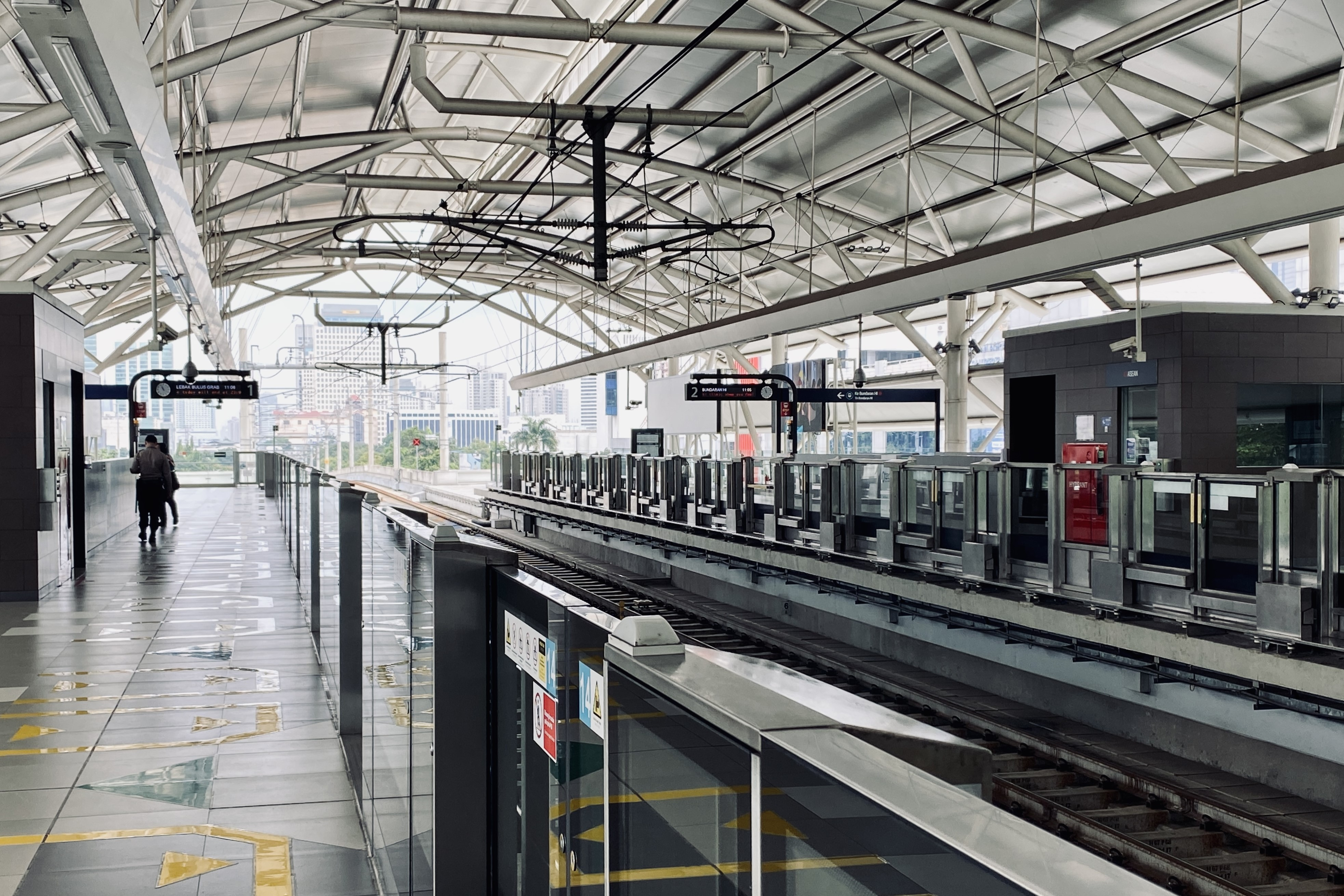
Interior of the ASEAN MRT Station

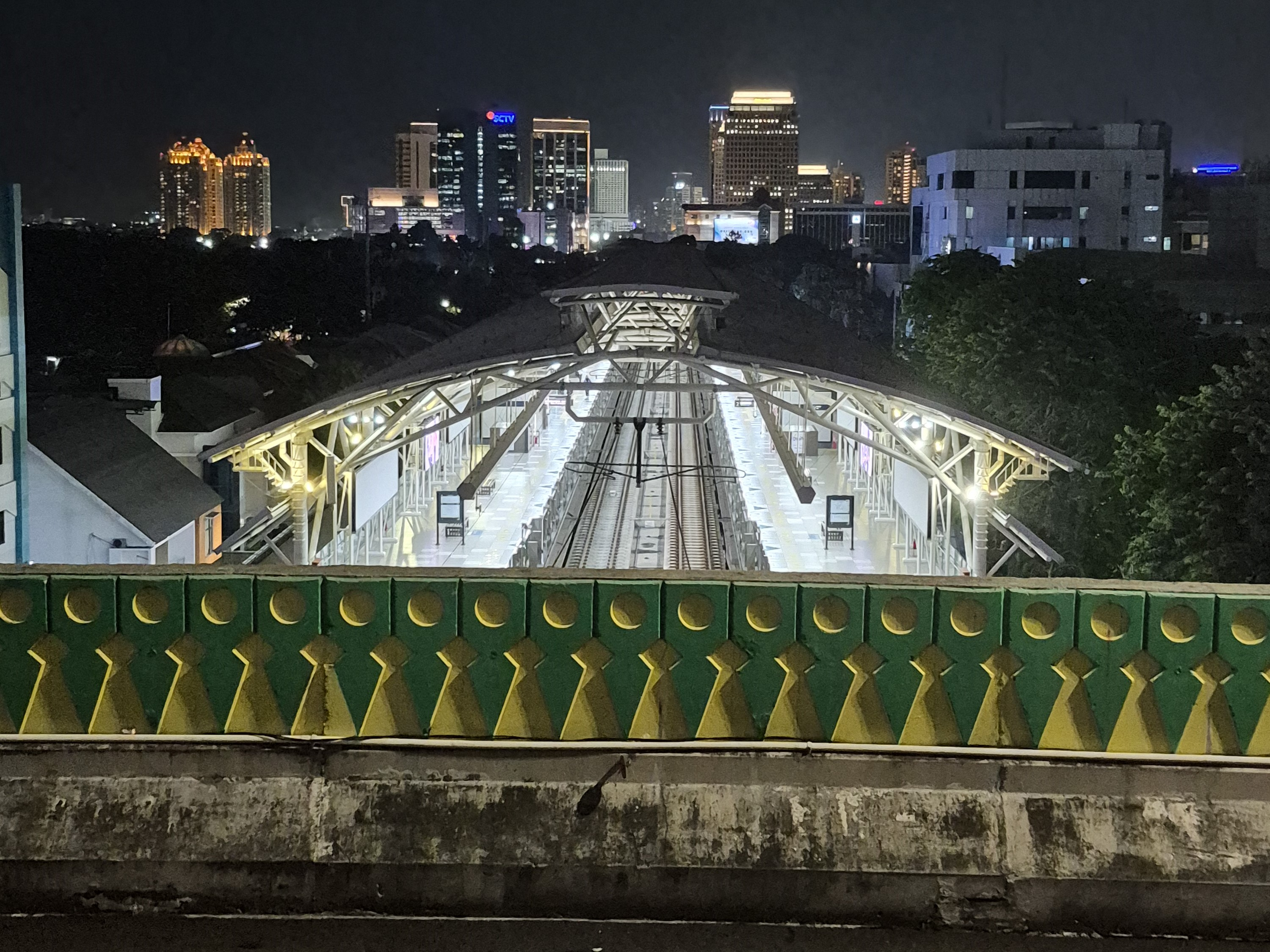
ASEAN MRT Station from CSW Bus Station, 2024
