= Soejoedi Wirjoatmodjo =

Indonesian architect

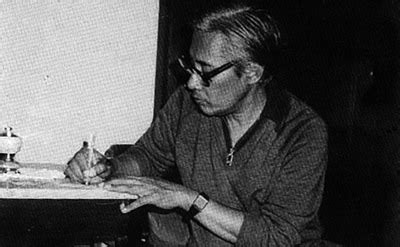
Soejoedi Wirjoatmodjo

Soejoedi Wirjoatmodjo (December 27, 1928 in Surakarta – June 17, 1981 in Jakarta) was an architect in Indonesia who was active during the late 1960s and mid-1970s. In 1964, he was asked by President Sukarno to be the chief architect for national architectural projects in Jakarta. Soejoedi is considered the first native architect of the Post-Colonial period and is considered a proponent of modernist architects and designers.

== Biography ==
Soejoedi was born in Surakarta in 1928. As a young man, he supported nationalist ideals. During the period of National Revolution, Soejodi joined the Student Fighters of Brigade 17 in Surakarta to counter military offensive from the Dutch between 1945 and 1949. When the Dutch leave Indonesia in 1949, one year later Soejoedi applied as an architect in the Building Department of the Technical College in Bandung, which still had a professional Dutch lecturer. From the quality of his works, Soejoedi was nominated and won a scholarship from the French government for a study in L’Ecole des Beaux Arts in Paris in 1955. He pursued his study in Paris, but he did not feel comfortable because of personal reason of homesick. Soejoedi's mentor in Bandung, Prof. Ir. Vincent Rogers van Romondt, arranged his further study at Technische Hogeschool Delft (now Delft University of Technology, the Netherlands so that he did not need to start from scratch. During his study, Soejoedi had the opportunities to see the works of Dutch modern architects e.g. Jacob Bakema and Aldo van Eyck. However, he did not work his design thesis at the college. Instead, he worked part-time as drafter at Kraaijvanger Architects, at that time a small firm. For the bureau, he worked for Rotterdam city reconstruction.

Political circumstances over West New Guinea increased tension between Indonesia and the Netherlands. These forced several Indonesian students to leave the Netherlands in 1957, including Soejoedi, who had to leave before being able to receive a degree in architecture. Soejoedi had to find somewhere else for the completion of his academic qualification in architectural engineering. In the same year, Soejoedi moved to Berlin to pursue his architectural degree at Technische Universität Berlin. He eventually graduated in 1959 with a design thesis on pesantren, the Islamic boarding school and training center, with the best marks.

Meanwhile, the increasing tension between the Dutch and the Republic of Indonesia as a consequence of President Sukarno's policy for taking over all foreign companies by the state corporations, caused harm on the higher education institutions, mainly because most of the teaching staff were Dutch nationals. The country needed qualified locals like Soejoedi to work in colleges and other institutions. In 1960, Soejoedi returned from Germany to Indonesia and worked in Bandung as lecturer. After few months, Soejoedi was promoted to be head of the department of architecture at his institution, now renamed the Institut Teknologi Bandung (ITB).

During his tenure as head of department, he emphasised the use and exploration of modern technology for building construction and material, especially concrete and steel structure. Between 1960 and 1964, he designed and built several buildings and family houses in Bandung. As a lecturer, he taught about artistic approaches. Form, function, and material are necessarily to be integrated as a geometrical and sculptural composition that works for specific purpose and context, and a strong embodiment to site.

In 1964, Soejoedi was called by President Sukarno to be in charge as chief architect for national architectural projects in Jakarta. As a nationalist, he took this request very seriously. He brought some colleagues and students from the institute and established his own firm in Jakarta, PT. Gubahlaras, in 1969. The vision of his firm is to unveil modern Indonesia through architectural endeavor.

== Design philosophy ==
The ASEAN secretariat building is designed by architect Soejoedi as a pure geometric form designed in harmony with the land where it stood, a characteristic of his design.

Soejoedi believed in architectural modernity as a vehicle of liberation from the traces of colonialism. He introduced Indonesian locality not as an imitation of traditional icons, forms, and styles; but in the search for spatial principles. He placed the Javanese concept of spatial category into his design: the balance of the realm of outside (jaba) and inside (njero), and the gradation of values from preliminary (purwa), intermediary (madya), and inner sanctum (utama or ndalem).

Soejoedi's design is characterized with pure geometrical composition. He put emphasis on the site of his building, making sure that the building is harmonious with said site and its conditions. Unlike Friedrich Silaban's grand design e.g. the Istiqlal Mosque, Soejoedi tried not design something that seems too grandiose or megalomaniac. Soejoedi realized that architecture is not a pure work of art, but also a public and utilitarian endeavor with respect to aesthetic and human experience such as: safety, comfort, and health. In this regard, Soejoedi always tried to open the dialogue between reason and intuition; for him, architecture is the field and playground for both human faculties in the search for something humanly useful and beautiful.

== Post-colonial architecture works ==
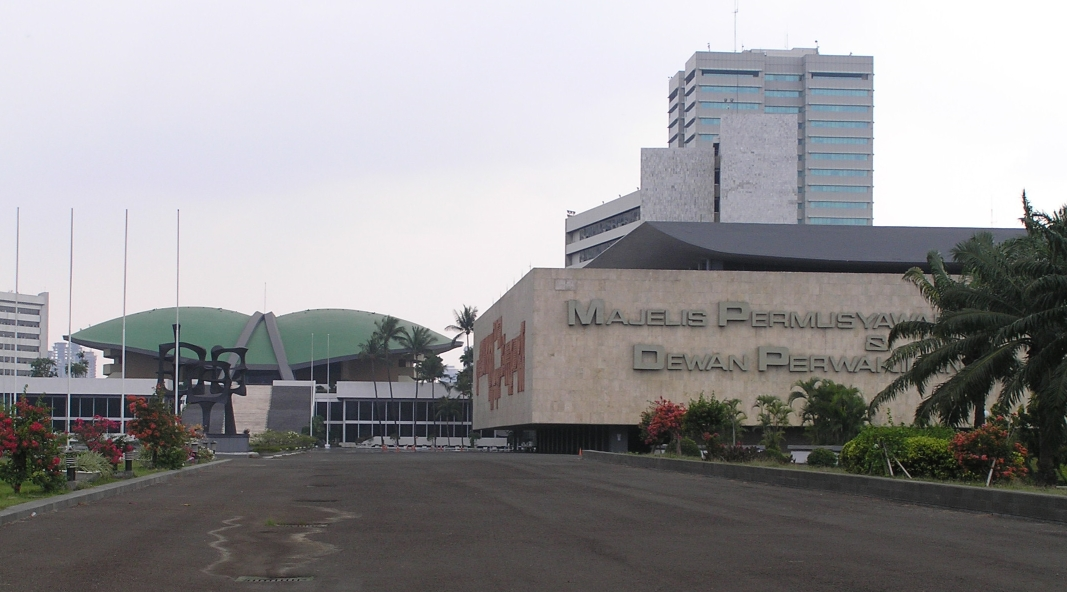
The Conefo, now the MPR/DPR building.

Among Soejoedi's work is the Conference of the New Emerging Forces, the Conefo (1964–1983). For this work, Soejoedi interpreted President Sukarno's intention for an image of a total independence from the East communist bloc and the West democratic capitalist bloc by designing a modern complex with no recognizable traces of precedent buildings.

Another of Soejoedi's project, probably the most infamous, is Duta Merlin Hotel project. The project was designed to replace the colonial hotel of Hotel des Indes, a masterpiece of Indies architect F.J.L. Ghijsels which was designed as an extraordinary adaptation of Art Deco in the tropical climate of Java, then known as the New Indies Style. For Soejoedi, establishing a new architecture for a national pride was probably more important than maintaining an old building with traces of colonialism of the past.

Below are some of Soejoedi's project.

- ASEAN Secretariat Building, Jakarta (1975)
- Balai Sidang Senayan (now Jakarta International Convention Center), Jakarta (1960–1965)
- Department of Agriculture complex, Jakarta
- Department of Forestry Tower (Manggala Wana Bhakti), Jakarta (1977)
- the Republic of Indonesia's Embassy, Kuala Lumpur
- French Embassy, Jakarta (1971, demolished in 2012)
- Gedung Pusat Grafika, Jakarta (1971)
- Office of the Ministry of Transportation
- Pembangkit Listrik Tenaga Air Sutami
- the Republic of Indonesia's Embassy, Belgrade
- the Republic of Indonesia's Embassy, Colombo

== See also ==
- Architecture of Indonesia

== Cited works ==
- Agus Sachari (2007). Budaya visual Indonesia: membaca makna perkembangan gaya visual karya desain di Indonesia abad ke-20 [Indonesian Visual Culture: Reading the meaning of the development of visual style in 20th century Indonesian design] (in Indonesian). Jakarta: Erlangga. ISBN 9789797819491.
- Akihary, Huib (1990). ARCHITECTUUR & STEDEBOUW IN INDONESIË 1870/1970. Zutphen: De Walburg Pers. ISBN 9060116976.
- Budi A Sukada (1998). Gunawan Tjahjono (ed.). Architecture. Indonesian Heritage. Vol. 6. Singapore: Archipelago Press. ISBN 981-3018-30-5.
- Het Indische bouwen: architectuur en stedebouw in Indonesie : Dutch and Indisch architecture 1800-1950. Helmond: Gemeentemuseum Helmond. 1990.
- Wiryomartono, Bagoes (March 2013). "SOEJOEDI AND ARCHITECTURE IN MODERN INDONESIA: A Critical Post-Colonial Study" (PDF). International Journal of Architectural Research. 7 (1). Archnet-IJAR.
