= ASEAN Sculpture Garden =

Garden in Kuala Lumpur, Malaysia

Coordinates: 3°9′1.5″N 101°41′2.5″E

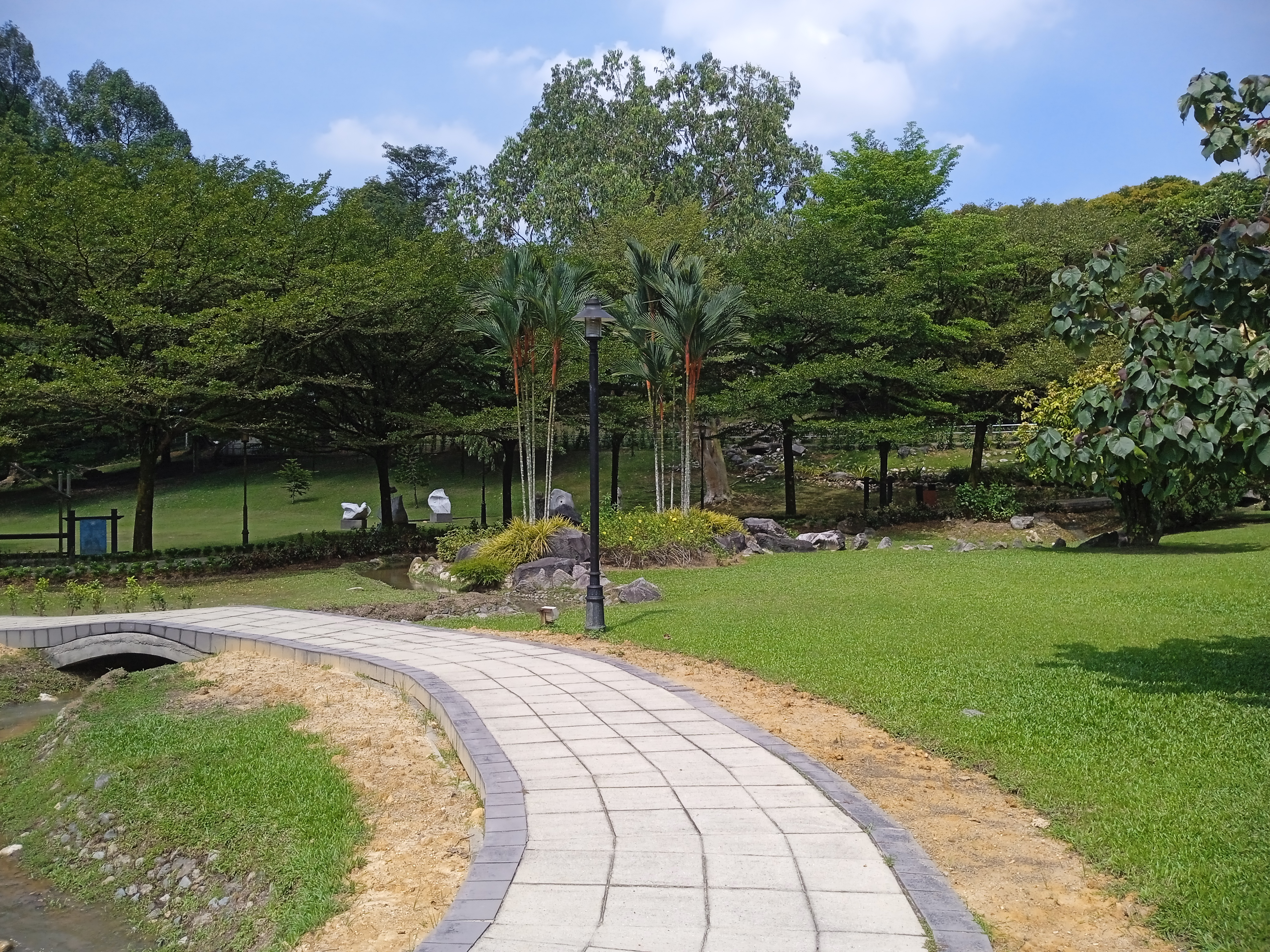
ASEAN Sculpture Garden

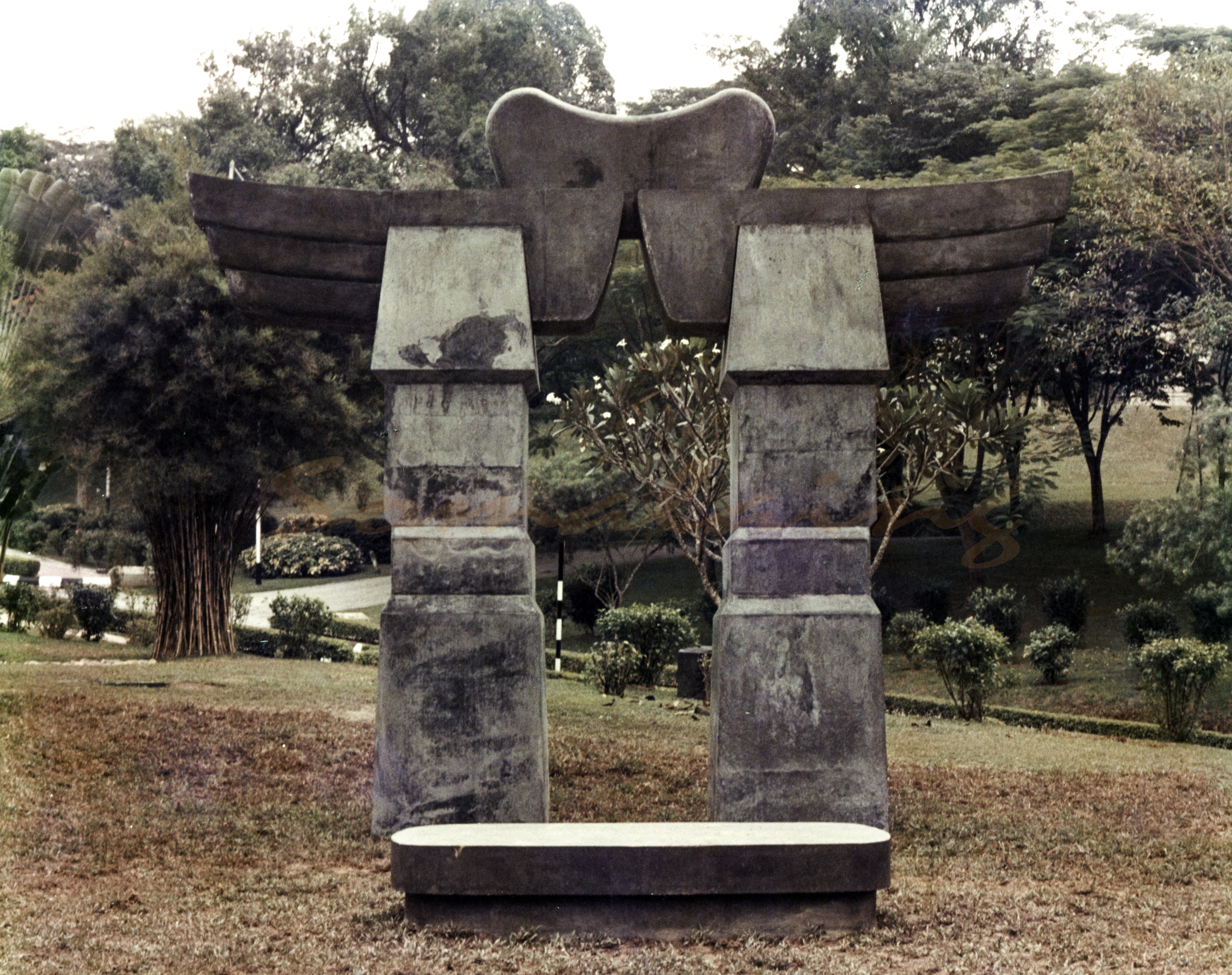
Gate of Harmony ASEAN Sculpture Garden

ASEAN Sculpture Garden is a garden in Kuala Lumpur, Malaysia, situated adjacent to the National Monument and in the vicinity of the Lake Gardens. It is a landscaped garden with a collection of prize-winning sculptures in wood, marble, iron and bamboo. Exhibits have been crafted by artists from the ASEAN region.

The ASEAN Sculpture Garden opened in Fort Canning Park in June 1982 to display the sculptures that were created for the symposium. A total of five sculptures were put up for display in the garden, namely: ‘Unity’, a copper plate abstract piece by Indonesian artist But Muchtar; ‘Taming Sari’, a fibreglass work consisting of a broken kris and sabre by Malaysian sculptor Ariffin Mohamed Ismail; ‘Fredesvinda’, a reinforced concrete structure of an unfinished boat by Filipino sculptor Napoleon V. Abueva;

== See also ==
- Lam Thaen Guest House
