= Lam Thaen Guest House =

Historic house in Laem Thaen, Thailand

- บ้านพักรับรองแหลมแท่น
- Interactive map of the Lam Thaen Guest House area

General information
- Type: Hospice; Guest house
- Location: 35 Bang Saen Sai 1 Rd. Mueang Chonburi district 20130, Bang Saen, Thailand
- Coordinates: 13.301990°N 100.898483°E
- Current tenants: Prime Minister of Thailand
- Groundbreaking: 1960
- Client: Field Marshal Sarit Thanarat
- Owner: Government of Thailand

Technical details
- Material: Concrete, stucco
- Floor count: 3

Design and construction
- Architect: Phon Chulasewak
- Awards: 2014 ASA Architectural Conservation Award
- Known for: Birthplace of ASEAN

Lam Thaen Guest House (Thai: บ้านพักรับรองแหลมแท่น) is a historic seaside residence in Bang Saen, Chonburi Province, Thailand. Built between 1960 and 1963 as a summer retreat for Prime Minister Field Marshal Sarit Thanarat, it was later used by his successor Field Marshal Thanom Kittikachorn. The house gained regional significance in August 1967 when it hosted informal discussions among the foreign ministers of Indonesia, Malaysia, the Philippines, Singapore, and Thailand that laid the groundwork for the ASEAN Declaration. Referred to as the "Birthplace of ASEAN," it is managed by under the Prime Minister of Thailand under state property. Despite talks and urgency for continued renovation among locals, the site lays dilapidated.

== History ==
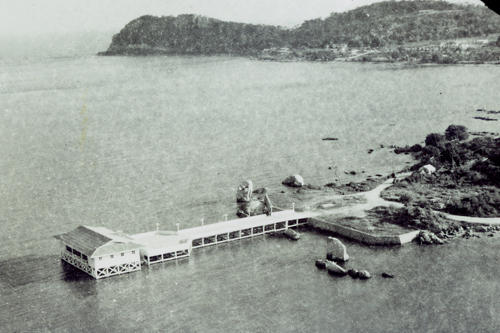
Laem Thaen Pier in the 1940s, with the vacant lot on the right later becoming the site of the house

The residence for Prime Minister in the area was originally constructed between 1943 and 1945 on the western slope of Khao Sam Muk (Sam Muk Hill) by then-Prime Minister Field Marshal Plaek Pibulsongkram. It was intended as a beachfront "weekend house" or retreat for high-ranking officials and visiting dignitaries, and it even served as a venue for occasional cabinet meetings and ministry conferences during Pibulsongkram's era.

Prior to the construction of the Lam Thaen Guest House, the Bang Saen Beach area, Khao Sam Muk, and its surrounding neighborhoods were sparsely populated and largely forested. Significant development began under the direction of Phibunsongkhram, who ordered the construction of residences for visiting foreign dignitaries, housing for government officials, and the building of roads linking Bang Saen to Khao Sam Muk. Pibulsongkram built a cluster of 13 villas in this area for government guests and officials, including a residence for his advisor Luang Wichit Wathakan.

=== Sarit Thanarat's resting house ===
In 1960, Sarit Thanarat built new houses for governmental purposes at Lam thaen (the southwest of the Sam Muk Mountain). Migrating southwards to the new location, government meetings were often held there. Thus much of the government houses from Pibulsongkram's tenure became dilapidated. Only two of the historic houses remain intact; Field Marshal Pibulsongkram's own villa and one other surviving house (the former Wichit residence). Sarit used the new housing as his personal seaside retreat, staying repeatedly during his premiership.

On the aftermath of an oath-taking ceremony on 8 November 1963, Sarit Thanarat began experiencing severe fatigue and dizziness. Seeking respite, he traveled to Bang Saen on 11 November. Against medical advice to rest, he continued to carry out his official duties at the House. On 12 November, Sarit convened a cabinet meeting at the Laem Taen Guest House, during which he vomited several times. Attending physicians urged him to pause for recovery, but he declined, only requesting that his shirt collar be loosened while he pressed on with the meeting until its conclusion. His condition did not improve in the days that followed, and although he persisted in signing official documents and receiving occasional visits from officials, by 26 November his health had deteriorated significantly, leaving him exhausted and confined to bed rest.

On 27 November 1963, King Bhumibol Adulyadej and Queen Sirikit paid a private visit to Field Marshal Sarit Thanarat at the Laem Taen Guest House, spending an extended period with him. The next day, 28 November, General Chitti Navisathien, Deputy Commander-in-Chief of the Royal Thai Army, visited Sarit and, after consultation with the medical committee, concurred that he should be moved to Phramongkutklao Hospital in Bangkok for full treatment and rest. Later that day, Sarit was transferred by airlift via helicopter to the hospital, where his illness soon became widely known. News of his condition drew much concern from government officials and the populace, while King Bhumibol sent a floral tribute through a royal representative. Sarit would pass away from liver failure on 8 December 1963.

His death later revealed the massive extent of Sarit's wealth, which totaled over US$100 million. He was discovered to have owned a trust company, a brewery, 51 cars, and 30 plots of land, most of which he gave to his dozens of mistresses, shocking the public when his corruption was uncovered. During the subsequent government of Field Marshal Thanom Kittikachorn, a five-manned committee was appointed by Thanom's government to probe the wealth of Sarit among his wives and sons amidst the fallout of the scandal. The investigation began on 16 June 1964. Once a summary report of the investigation was submitted to the government, the Council of State voted 25 to 22 out of 48 to seize all of Field Marshal Sarit's inherited assets; invoking Article 17 of the 1959 Constitution. Thanom Kittikachorn thus nationalized the property as part of posthumous anti-corruption measures packet.

=== Birthplace of ASEAN ===
Laem Thaen House's most significant role came in August 1967 during the formative negotiations of the Association of Southeast Asian Nations (ASEAN). At that time, Thailand's Foreign Minister Dr. Thanat Khoman invited counterparts from four neighboring countries of Indonesia, Malaysia, the Philippines, and Singapore for a secret meeting to discuss and negotiate establishing a new regional cooperation bloc. Ceylon was also present at Bang Saen as an attempt to join the fledgeling organization.

From August 5–6, 1967, the five Southeast Asian dignitaries gathered at the quiet Laem Thaen beach house, away from Bangkok's spotlight, to hash out the final terms of what would become ASEAN. During this retreat, the delegations forged a preliminary accord affectionately dubbed "The Spirit of Bang Saen" (จิตวิญญาณแห่งบางแสน). Done after the end of hostility between the five nations in the aftermath of Konfrontasi, this document captured the consensus and goodwill of the Bang Saen discussions essentially a gentlemen's agreement or informal MOU aligning the five nations’ vision for regional cooperation. To Thailand's Ministry of Foreign Affairs the Bang Saen meeting on 6 August 1967, guided by the “Spirit of Bangsaen” agreement, directly paved the way for ASEAN's creation two days later.

=== Deterioration and calls for renovation ===
In the decades after the 1967 ASEAN talks, the Laem Thaen Guest House saw diminishing official use. Political changes and Bangkok's centralization meant that the seaside retreat was rarely needed for state purposes. By the 1980s and 1990s, the property was largely idle and minimally maintained, even as Bang Saen grew into a popular beach town for domestic tourists. The once-grand modernist villa gradually fell into decay as structural concrete columns cracked exposing rusted rebar, woodwork deteriorated, and the grounds became overgrown. The situation was exacerbated by administrative limbo: the land is owned by the local Saensuk Municipality, but the house and its compound are under the responsibility of the Prime Minister's Office (OPM) This split ownership made it unclear who should fund and execute restorations, resulting in years of inaction even as the building's condition worsened.

In 2014, an important recognition came as the Association of Siamese Architects (ASA) under Royal Patronage honored Laem Thaen Guest House with the Architectural Conservation Award (Outstanding Conservation of Architectural Heritage) in the category of public buildings. Presented by H.R.H. Princess Maha Chakri Sirindhorn in 2014, the ASA presented the award in the acknowledgement of the guest house as a valuable piece of mid-century architecture and a heritage site worthy of preservation. Following the ASA award, there were sporadic initiatives to rehabilitate the site. One early plan (around 2015) involved including Laem Thaen's refurbishment in a government budget for city development projects under an extension then approved by the Thai Cabinet. Prior to this, the disbursed budget, excluding debt obligations, amounted to 221,299,289 baht for 15 separate items. This allocation formed part of a broader program of urban development projects, which also covered the renovation of Command Buildings 1 and 2, the Government House Guest House, the Prime Minister's Operations Center (PMOC) development project, the refurbishment of Laem Taen Guest House in Chonburi Province, and the renovation of the former Civil Service Commission office building for conversion into the Office of the Permanent Secretary. However, meaningful action did not occur until Thailand was preparing to host major international meetings again.

In 2018, ahead of Thailand's ASEAN chairmanship in 2019 (the 33rd ASEAN Summit), the Office of the Prime Minister under, Prime Minister Prayut Chan-o-cha, proposed to renovate Laem Thaen Guest House as a VIP retreat for visiting ASEAN leaders. A sum of 200 million baht (approximately US$6 million) from leftover funds of Government House renovations was earmarked for this purpose. A high-level committee was appointed including the Director-General of Fine Arts Department (responsible for historic sites), the Department of Public Works and Town & Country Planning, the Royal Thai Army's engineering corps, Chonburi provincial officials, and the Mayor of Saensuk to oversee the restoration and landscaping of Laem Thaen in time for the late-2019 summit. Despite these ambitious plans, the restoration timeline fell short. Workers did begin repairs, scaffolding went up around the structure, and preliminary stabilization was done. But the project was never completed by 2019. The ASEAN Summit in 2019 ultimately did not utilize the Bang Saen guest house (as the leaders stayed in Bangkok), and the momentum and funding for the restoration seemingly stalled. By mid-2020, local media reported that the site was still abandoned with rusting scaffolds left in place and construction debris scattered around the cordoned periferry.

In July 2020, community frustration peaked. Bang Saen residents filed complaints to the press, decrying that the historic site had been "allowed to rot into an eyesore". They urged the OPM to urgently renovate and adapt the site into a historical monument or museum, capitalizing on its ASEAN heritage to educate future generations. The Mayor of Saensuk at the time, Narongchai Khunpluem, publicly supported the residents’ plea, noting that the house had once been a majestic landmark and source of local pride for decades, and that its continued decay pained the community. The mayor explained that the municipality's hands were tied since the structure belonged to the central government (OPM); any restoration would require action and budget from Bangkok. The mayor stated that the city had even improved the beachfront outside the compound in anticipation. However, the actual building refurbishment stalled after erecting a workers’ camp and scaffolds. By then it was left unfinished.

The site's future became briefly entangled in Thailand's plans for hosting APEC 2022. There was speculation that Laem Thaen might be refreshed as part of showcasing Thai heritage during the APEC Economic Leaders’ Meeting. Ultimately, however, APEC events were held in Bangkok, and Laem Thaen saw no new investment.

Amidst tensions due to the 2025 Cambodia–Thailand border conflict, the Cambodian flag displayed at the ASEAN commemoration flagpoles in front of the Laem Taen Guest House was flown at half-mast by a local resident. On July 26, the flag was reported missing from the pole.

== Design ==
Laem Taen House was designed by Phon Chulasewak, Principal Architect at the Department of Public Works and Town & Country Planning, with the help of foreign engineers/architects. He is more infamous for designing the Old Parliament House in Bangkok. The house is a three leveled reinforced concrete post and beam construction filled with brick wall building, with a rooftop sun deck designed for events and views of Bangsaen Beach.

The architectural plan takes into account the surrounding environment. The long front layout parallels the beach while the crossed sections are guest units and a reception area. Building materials used on each side of the building were carefully selected with direction of sunlight in mind. Roofing materials uses red double-glazed cement tiles on the accommodation side contrasting with brown slate and sandstone. The architectural design incorporates both vertical and horizontal elements to create a balanced and functional rhythm. Concrete awnings provide protection from sun and rain, and patterned siding contribute additional shading. The ground floor features a gathering space with terrazzo flooring, while the upper floors contain four suite guest rooms with en-suite bathrooms. The three-storey sea-facing side also include a meeting and banquet hall with a capacity of 50–100 people, furnished with crafted woodwork, ventilated concrete block wall, metal sheet plate decoration and modern furnishings.

== See also ==
- ASEAN Headquarters
