= ASEAN Declaration =

Founding treaty of Association of Southeast Asian Nations

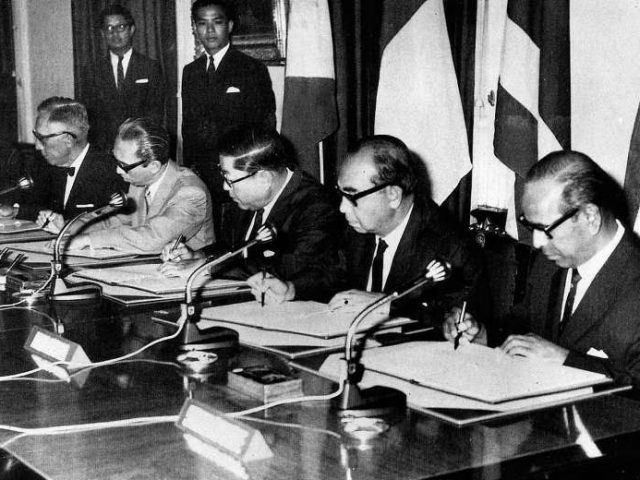
- Signing of the declaration by five foreign ministers at the main hall of Saranrom Palace, on Phra Nakhon, Bangkok
- Type: Founding treaty
- Signed: 8 August 1967
- Location: Phra Nakhon in Bangkok, Thailand
- Original signatories: Adam Malik; Tun Abdul Razak; S. Rajaratnam; Narciso Ramos; Thanat Khoman

Full text
- Bangkok Declaration at Wikisource

The ASEAN Declaration, commonly known as the Bangkok Declaration, is the founding charter of the Association of Southeast Asian Nations (ASEAN). Signed on 8 August 1967 by the foreign ministers of Indonesia, Malaysia, the Philippines, Singapore, and Thailand in Bangkok, the capital city of Thailand, it formally established the Association to promote regional cooperation in economic, social, cultural, technical, and administrative fields, and to foster regional peace and stability through adherence to the United Nations Charter and the rule of law.

The Declaration states the basic principles of sovereign equality, non‑interference, and consensus-based decision-making (known as Musyawarah) among members. Although conceived during the Cold War amid concerns over communist expansion, its text notably omits any direct reference to ideological or military alliances. The date of its signing is now commemorated annually as ASEAN Day throughout Southeast Asia.

== Background ==
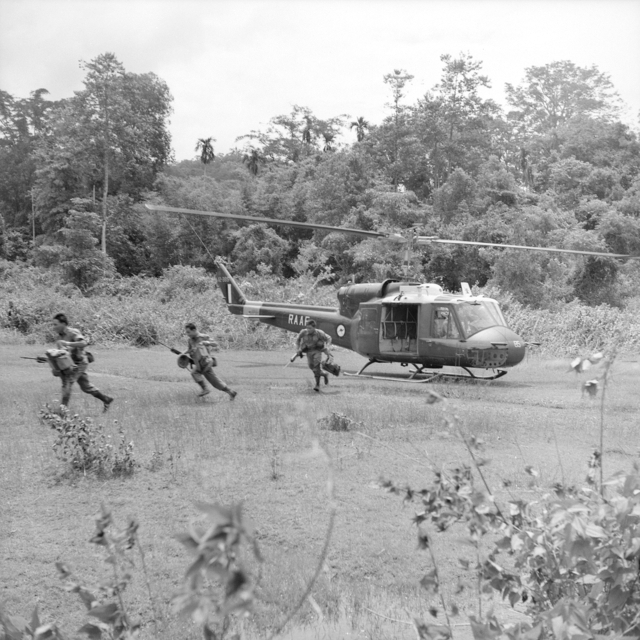
Sarawak Rangers hop out a Bell UH-1 helicopter to guard the Malaysia–Thailand border. By 1964, Southeast Asia was at a brinkmanship of regional war.

In the mid-1960s, Southeast Asia was riven by conflicts and distrust. Indonesia under President Sukarno had waged Konfrontasi (Confrontation) against the newly created Federation of Malaysia, and the Philippines had severed relations with Malaysia over the Sabah dispute. By August 1966, however, the geopolitical landscape shifted dramatically. Sukarno was eased from power and General Suharto's New Order regime moved to end Konfrontasi by signing a peace agreement on 11 August 1966 in Bangkok, formally concluding their hostilities. In parallel, President Ferdinand Marcos of the Philippines quietly shelved Manila's claim to Sabah and restored diplomatic ties with Malaysia in mid-1966. These reconciliations removed the principal obstacles to regional rapprochement. Sensing an opportunity during Indonesia's presence in Bangkok, Thanat Khoman spearheaded plans for a new regional organisation.

=== Proposal ===
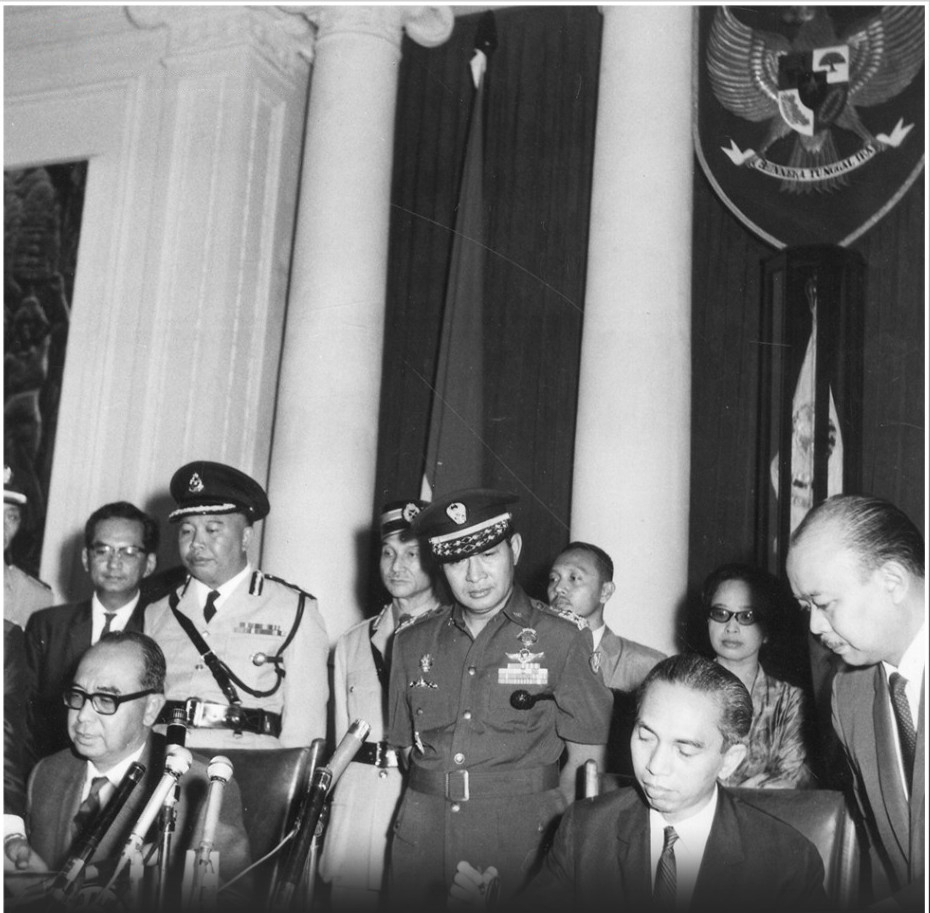
Tun Abdul Razak and Adam Malik signing the Bangkok Agreement, 11 August 1966. The end of confrontation marks the beginning of ASEAN.

During a banquet in Bangkok to commemorate the end of Konfrontasi and the start of rapprochement, Thanat quietly floated the idea of a broader alliance to Indonesia's Foreign Minister Adam Malik. Initially receptive, Malik was quick to agree on the concept, whilst noting Indonesia's first needed to normalise relations fully with Malaysia. Indeed, Malik was eager to reintegrate Indonesia into regional affairs after Sukarno's isolationism, had been "courting an invitation to join" a revived ASA even before 1967.

In late November, the Thai Foreign Minister expressed his hope for the revival of the Association of Southeast Asia (ASA). Meanwhile, Tunku Abdul Rahman discussed the possibility of expanding the ASA organisation. Thai Foreign Minister Thanat Khoman, however, emphasised a cautious approach, suggesting that expansion should be considered step by step. During this period, Tunku Abdul Rahman expressed reservations about the prospect of ASA, an organisation initiated by Malaysia, would soon be replaced by a new Southeast Asian association. He initially viewed Indonesia as a non-founding member and regarded the proposed new organisation as merely an extension of the former ASA. However, after several rounds of talks held in Bangkok which lasted until 20 May, Tunku ultimately endorsed and accepted Adam Malik's reasoning that a completely new organisation was necessary, rather than simply continuing ASA. Malik believed that neither ASA nor Maphilindo accurately reflected regional realities, and that Indonesia could not join ASA; instead, a new body was necessary, one that would incorporate elements of both ASA and Maphilindo. This new association would emphasise close cooperation among neighbouring Southeast Asian countries in economic, cultural, and technical fields. Malik envisioned Indonesia, Malaysia, the Philippines, and Thailand as the founder members, with Singapore also included, though its status as a founding member remained uncertain. According to British diplomat Horace Phillips, Indonesia viewed itself, by virtue of its size and strategic position, as the natural leader in the region and insisted on being a founding member of any new regional grouping rather than merely joining an existing association.

Though the original plan was to include only ASA and Indonesia, Thanat under alignment with Indonesia noted that Singapore, which had been expelled from Malaysia in August, would be welcomed into the new organisation. Narciso Ramos also wanted Singapore to join the organisation, however believes that Malaysia should have "first to say." Under this invitation, Singapore's Lee Kuan Yew and foreign Minister, S. Rajaratnam was initially cautious on the prospect of joining ASEAN, more so from the aftermath of its expulsion from Malaysia and the intricacies of nation-building. To Malaysia's foreign minister, the invitation of Singapore was more or less a diplomatic necessity rather than the belief of regionalism. As commitments show, Singapore eventually viewed ASEAN as its first step to stimulate its economy and address, or ideally eliminate, racial disparities. Participation in the organisation was also seen as a way to counter perceptions of Singapore as simply another Chinese state in Asia. Thus Prime Minister Lee Kuan Yew dispatched S. Rajaratnam to see Thanat at the negotiating table in Bangkok to further discuss the prospect of becoming a founder state of the new organisation.

Even so, the potential revival also depended on a decision from the Philippines, and Thanat mentioned the prospect of mediation to facilitate the process. At the time, due to its long-standing and strong economic and security links to the United States, the Philippine government had felt very little need get involved with other regional agreements, such those that ASEAN would provide. In addition, the Philippines' reluctance to support ASEAN regionalism stemmed from its differences with Malaysia about Sabah. Despite so, Secretary of Foreign Affairs, Narciso Ramos continued under a conviction that ASEAN will serve as the cornerstone of Philippine foreign policy. Going as to inviting Tunku Abdul Razak and his family for a quiet weekend in Baguio to build personal rapport and address the Sabah issue in a relaxed setting.

Meanwhile, after discussions with Thanat Khoman, Adam Malik engaged with leaders from Burma and Cambodia to explore the possibility of their participation as founding members of ASEAN. By including nations with neutral foreign policy stances, this view was purportedly motivated by a desire to diversify the association's political makeup and diminish concerns that it was favouring Western-aligned interests. In May 1967, Malik visited Rangoon on official business to discuss the ASEAN proposal with Burmese leaders. Rangoon, however, showed little official interest in the proposal because of its internal issues, neutrality policy, and worries about China's anticipated responses to its ASEAN membership. Rangoon would thus reject the proposal "outright." With that, Malik then flew to Phnom Penh with unfavourable terms. Cambodia turned down the invitation, citing its strict neutrality and non-alignment policy. Norodom Sihanouk of Cambodia voiced reservations and, in a letter to General Suharto, conveyed his concern over the possible complications arising from the Vietnam War and the risk of growing American influence in Southeast Asia. As news of the meeting leaked, the Cambodian media later criticised the proposed ASEAN as a group closely linked to American imperialism and hailed its government's decision to not join as a "very wise move". South Vietnam was not invited to join the grouping due to the ongoing war. Thus the organisation stayed with its 5 members.

== Drafting ==
=== First draft ===
Prior to the Bangkok Conference, Thanat's Foreign Office had prepared and revised multiple draft charters for the prospective association, with the earliest draft originally sent to Tunku Abdul Rahman in earlier December 1966 to gauge support and begin formal negotiations. As the drafts of the declaration were sent to other members, only Indonesia responded with amendments in mind. At this point, the original proposal name for the organisation was the South East Asian Association for Regional Cooperation (SEAARC), which had similar mechanisms to the former ASA organisation. The declaration itself was formed based on this premise when two senior Foreign Ministry officials from Indonesia, Chaidir Anwar Sani and Abu Bakar Lubis, were deployed to Thailand at the end of 1966 to help Thanat's foreign office. And so, the draft had held several language and excerpts from the Manila Declaration that formed Maphilindo.

The draft began by affirming the shared belief that Southeast Asian nations held the primary responsibility for ensuring regional stability, safeguarding their national identities from subversion, and supporting peaceful and progressive development in line with their peoples' aspirations. It emphasised that foreign military bases were temporary in nature and should not be used to undermine national independence, nor should collective defence arrangements serve the particular interests of any major power. Expressing a desire to establish a solid foundation for joint action, the foreign ministers declared the formation of the South East Asian Association for Regional Cooperation (SEAARC). The proposed aims included promoting mutual understanding and friendly cooperation, strengthening regional peace and security, encouraging Southeast Asian studies, and consulting and cooperating on common issues to resolve disputes collectively. It envisioned effective mechanisms for consultation and mutual assistance in economic, social, cultural, technical, scientific, and administrative fields, including shared research facilities, training programs, and resource development. The draft affirmed that the association would not be tied to any external power bloc nor directed against any country, instead the collective will to work together for the well-being and progress of the region without compromising sovereignty, adopting machinery similar to that of ASA.

This draft was met by resistance by most members, particularly that of Malaysia, who were convinced that the draft was made in Indonesia. Most being for the reference of the proclamation "... that foreign bases are temporary in nature and should not be allowed to be used directly or indirectly to subvert the national independence of their countries, and that arrangements of collective defence should not be used to serve the particular interest of any of the big powers." On the draft, Malaysia wanted to maintain long-term deterrence against Indonesia because of their concerns about the country's uncertain administration and the possibility that it might return to its hardline and exclusive diplomacy.

The excerpt in question was written down by the Indonesian Army, who at the time held much sway within the country. The Generals wanted Indonesia and its regional neighbours in ASEAN to have a closer security co-operation which in effect. Believing that, in the long run, the organisation can be used a tool to reduce and eventually take over the security role of the outside powers in the region, in turn, increasing the military's budget. Under a military junta, Adam Malik had to tolerate the army's meddling within the negotiation process. Anwar Sani believed that the excerpt would not cause problems since the wording did not extend to defence. Personally, Adam Malik had a number of differences with Suharto's Indonesian National Armed Forces Generals such as General Maraden Panggabean over the way in which Indonesia should approach its foreign policy in Southeast Asia. Then influential Chief of Staff of the Indonesian Army, General Maraden Panggabean, had asserted that Indonesia must enhance its military forces to participate in a collective defence initiative with its neighbours in light of "China's ambitions in the region and aspirations for nuclear capability," The Generals were also in favour of sending Indonesian troops to help the South Vietnamese in the Vietnam War. On the other hand, Malik dismissed a regional military alliance as contrary to the principles of Indonesia's national policy established by the Provisional People's Consultative Assembly (MPRS), citing its "Free and Active" policy. Malik insisted that ASEAN should only be about economic, not military co-operation. Both Malik and Anwar Sani considered the Army's proposal as "unrealistic, besides being undesirable from the domestic point of view." To this end, President Suharto eventually sided with the views of the Ministers.

=== Sports-Shirt Diplomacy ===
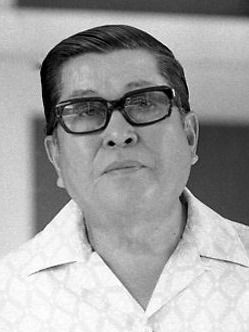
Thanat Khoman, chose an informal approach to ease tensions within Southeast Asia

The stall resulting from continued discussions with Thailand and Malik's visits briefly misled Abdul Razak into thinking that a Southeast Asian organisation would proceed without Malaysia. In response, Malaysia offered to host the organisation's ministerial meeting to reaffirm its support. Thus to dispel discouragement, on July 21, Thailand issued formal invitations for a five-nation conference to be held in Bangkok on 3 August 1967. By this point, a consensus on the draft's content and on the SEAARC proposal had essentially been reached among some attending governments, as the basic preparatory groundwork of the organisation had been made by Thanat, S. Rajaratnam, and Adam Malik in separate informal talks prior. Before formal negotiations began in Bangkok, Thai Foreign Minister Thanat Khoman employed a strategic approach to create trust among the delegates by inviting the visiting ministers to an informal retreat at Bang Saen, a seaside resort approximately 100 kilometres from Bangkok. Specifically staying at the Lam Thaen Guest House, the summer residence of then Thai Prime Minister Thanom Kittikachorn.

For two days, beginning around August 5, 1967, the five foreign ministers spent time together in a relaxed setting, playing golf, sharing meals, and engaging in open conversations, all while dressed casually. This atmosphere of informality contrasted sharply with conventional diplomatic protocols and was later affectionately referred to as "sports-shirt diplomacy" attributed to Thanat Khoman. Much of ASEAN's innerworkings were negotiated and attributed through golf and the two day networking. Although conducted in an informal setting, the negotiation process was not without its challenges. Each minister entered the discussions with distinct historical and political perspectives, often differing significantly from one another. Through humour, goodwill, and mutual respect, the ministers were able to address and reconcile these differences. In parallel to their formal meetings, they continued exchanges whilst contributing to an atmosphere that facilitated candid dialogue. This informal interaction and formal negotiation would later characterise the ASEAN ministerial tradition.

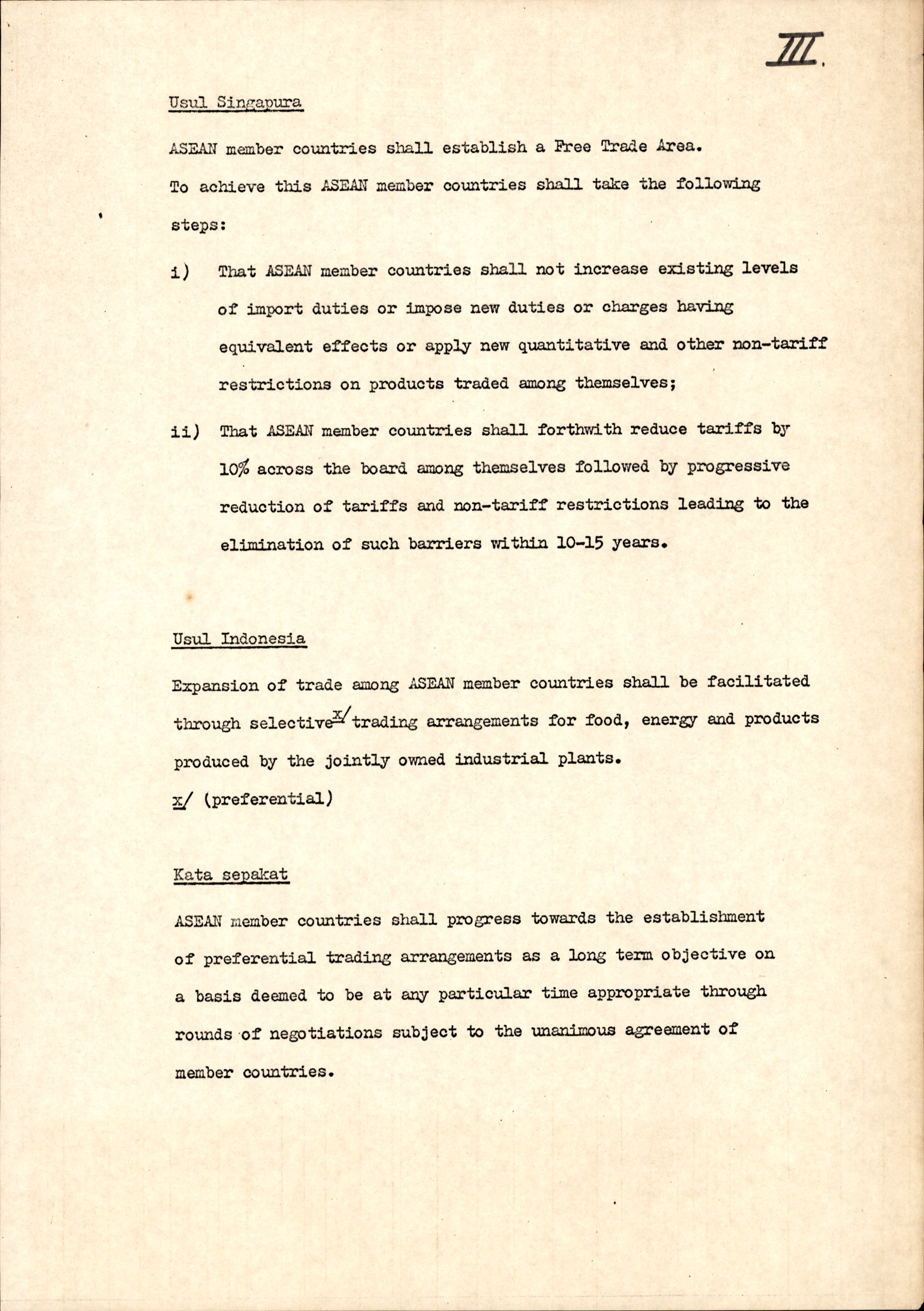
Excerpt of recommendations made by the Singaporean and Indonesian delegations for the drafting of the ASEAN Declaration

On August 4, Singapore Foreign Minister S. Rajaratnam arrived to Bangkok first. Accompanied by senior officials including Woon Wah Siang, S. R. Nathan, Ngiam Tong Dow, and S. Dhanabalan. Singapore had carried modest but concrete economic proposals, including plans for a joint shipping line, industrial rationalisation, and regional cooperation among rice-producing countries to reduce rising rice prices. Rajaratnam emphasised the importance of small countries forming economic groupings to achieve equality with developed nations. Philippines's foreign affairs secretary, Narciso Ramos also arrived on the same day. After landing in Bangkok, the delegated were then re-routed to Bang Saen.

On August 5 in the afternoon, Malaysia's Deputy Prime Minister Tun Abdul Razak arrived to Bangkok. Abdul Razak was accompanied by the deputy secretary to the Ministry of Foreign Affairs, Hussain Osman, Zainal Abidin bin Sulong and Zain Azraai, and an official of the Economic Planning Unit, Pang Kon Hkee. The Malaysian delegation planned to return on August 11. Not long after, Indonesia's foreign minister, Adam Malik landed after the arrival of Malaysia's delegation. Initially, Malik expressed hesitation about attending the Bangkok summit due to being closely coinciding with Indonesia's Independence Day celebrations on 17 August. As a result, his participation in the declaration was briefly delayed. The same day, the Ministers played golf at the Bangpra Golf Club in Bang Saen. Malik held reason for not joining the game due to not being a golfer. Using the opportunity, the Ministers would talk on how to integrate Indonesia within the ASEAN framework as Indonesia was not a member of the Asian and Pacific Council (ASPAC) and the Association of Southeast Asia (ASA).

On August 6, the five foreign ministers played a round of golf at the par-72, Bangpra Golf Club. During the game, the ministers used humour and personal anecdotes to diffuse tensions, allowing them to discreetly introduce proposals and explore potential compromises on key issues. Meanwhile, among the topics discussed at Bang Saen House were plans were to expand projects initially developed under ASA, including fisheries, education, cultural exchanges, and aerial services, as well as the possibility of establishing a joint Asian airline and shipping line. However, many of the ministers privately agreed that the most critical objective was to reintegrate Indonesia into the "family of nations." On the night, the leaders further discussed on the structure and framework of the regional grouping back at the Bang Saen House. The Malaysian and Filipino delegation also discussed on the Sabah issue, concluding on an anti-smuggling agreement between the two countries and a summit by September. After another related meeting by the morning of August 7, Thanat Khoman stated that there was "very favourable attitude" toward the formation of the association. The Ministers are then scheduled to meet in a closed working session by August 8 and an open meeting on Tuesday to announce the new body.

== Signing ==
=== Bangkok conference ===
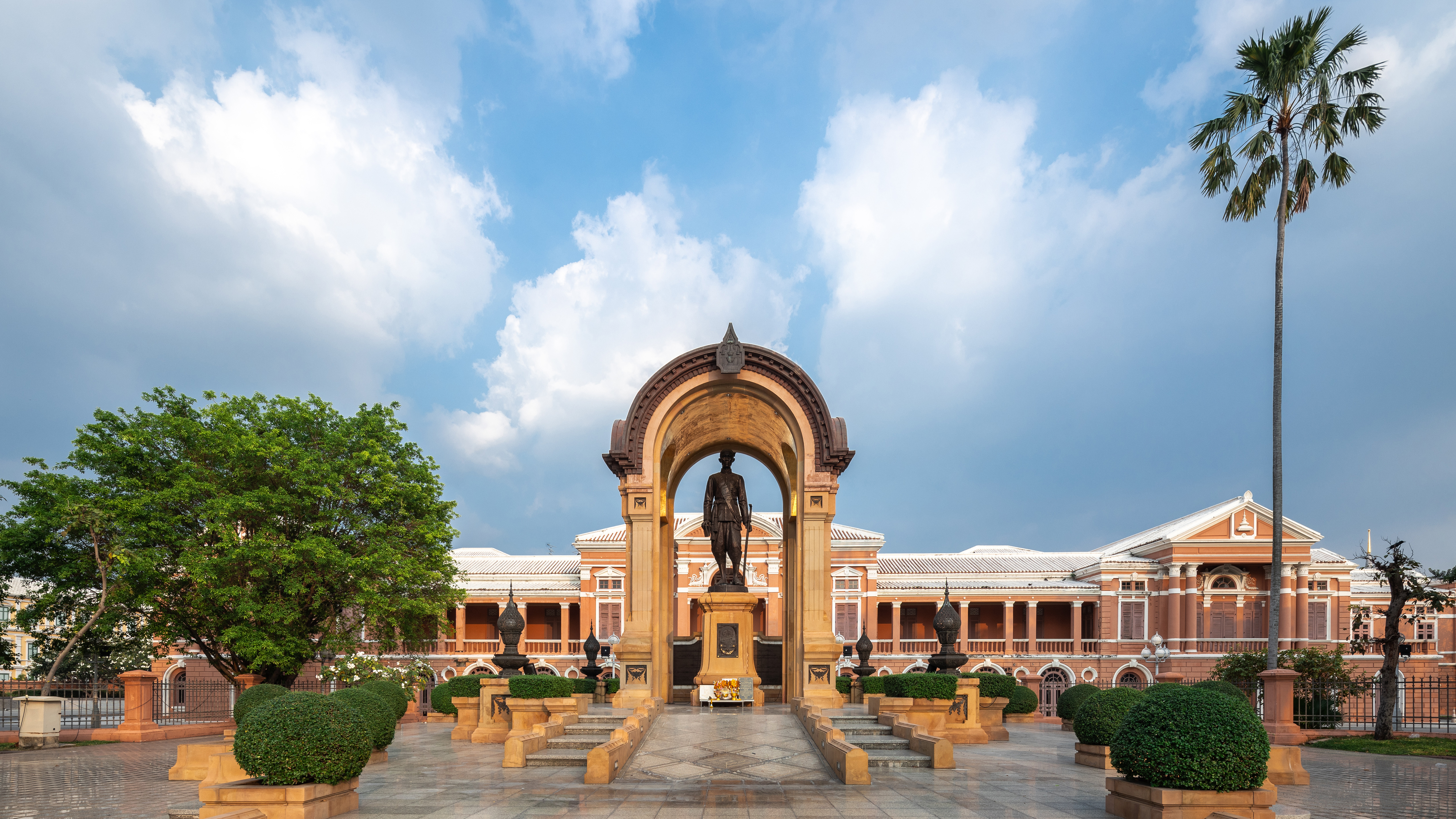
Saranrom Palace in Bangkok, Thailand, the site of the signing of the ASEAN Declaration.

After the productive retreat at Bang Saen, the ministers reconvened in Bangkok for the formal 1st ASEAN Ministerial Meeting. On August 8, 1967, working sessions were held at Thailand's Department of Foreign Affairs (located at Saranrom Palace in Bangkok) to finalise the agreement. By the time the ministers convened for the formal meeting, extensive private lobbying and informal discussions at Bang Saen had already led to the emergence of a general consensus. Through ongoing exchanges and the active sharing of ideas during private conversations, proposals often evolved to the point where it was difficult to determine their original source. This facilitated smoother agreement when the formal negotiations began.

At the conference, the group held a brief discussion on what the name of the organisation should be. The name insofar stuck initially was the South East Asian Association for Regional Cooperation (SEAARC) which was the initial framework proposed by the Indonesian delegation. The concern suddenly arose when the name had been troubling the Filipino delegation who repeatedly stumbled on its pronunciation. Though, Narciso Ramos claimed to the press that the name was troubling due to its "similarities to the word 'Shark'". Consensus then deemed that proposed name was considered too lengthy and awkward, thus needed for change. The decision was made to retain the "Association of Southeast Asia" (ASA) name, reflecting both continuity with the former organisation and Tunku Rahman's earlier ambition for regional cooperation. An alternative title, "Association of Southeast Asian States" (ASAS), was also used informally by the Thai secretariat, chosen for its regional resonance and Malay-inspired phrasing. Ultimately, Indonesian Foreign Minister Adam Malik proposed modifying the name to "Association of Southeast Asian Nations" (ASEAN) to distinguish it more clearly from the previous ASA framework.

== Signatories ==
A newsreel documenting the signing ceremony of the ASEAN Declaration.

The original copy of the ASEAN Declaration. Signed on 8 August 1967

ASEAN listed the signatories of the ASEAN Declaration as its founding fathers. Collectively known as the "Big Five", these individuals are credited with laying the groundwork for ASEAN's principles of regional cooperation, non-interference, and mutual respect, which continue to guide the organisation today. These are:

Picture	Name	Signatures	Description
	Adam Malik	Indonesia	As Indonesia's Foreign Minister, Malik was instrumental in reversing Indonesia's Konfrontasi with Malaysia. Malik also contributed significantly to the drafting of the Bangkok Declaration, the tenets of musyawarah (consultation) and mufakat (which evolved to the ASEAN Way), and the naming of ASEAN.
	Tun Abdul Razak	Malaysia	Serving concurrently as Malaysia's Deputy Prime Minister and Minister of Defence, Tun Abdul Razak steered the association toward non-alignment, formalised that stance in ZOPFAN, pressed for tighter internal machinery, and reframed ASEAN diplomacy to let Southeast Asians, not external patrons, decide the region's future.
	Narciso R. Ramos	Philippines	A journalist and member of the Philippine resistance during World War II, Ramos was first to speak at ASEAN's founding to stress the importance of regional cooperation, citing challenges to the countries of Southeast Asia during uncertain and critical times. He embedded the idea that ASEAN should resolve or dampen internal disputes peacefully, a principle later codified in the 1976 Treaty of Amity and Cooperation.
	S. Rajaratnam	Singapore	First foreign minister of Singapore, Rajaratnam argued that regionalism was essential to complement individualistic nationalism. Rajaratnam warned of the dangers of "balkanisation", and saw a united Southeast Asia as essential for collective regional resilience.
	Thanat Khoman	Thailand	Thailand's foreign minister, Khoman initiated the dialogue that led to ASEAN, first at a banquet that eased regional tensions. He drafted the charter and hosted "sports-shirt diplomacy" talks at Bang Saen, laying the groundwork for the Bangkok Declaration and character of the ASEAN Summits. For his long life and contributions to Southeast Asia, he was honoured as 'the last founding father' by ASEAN's succeeding foreign ministers.

== Legacy ==
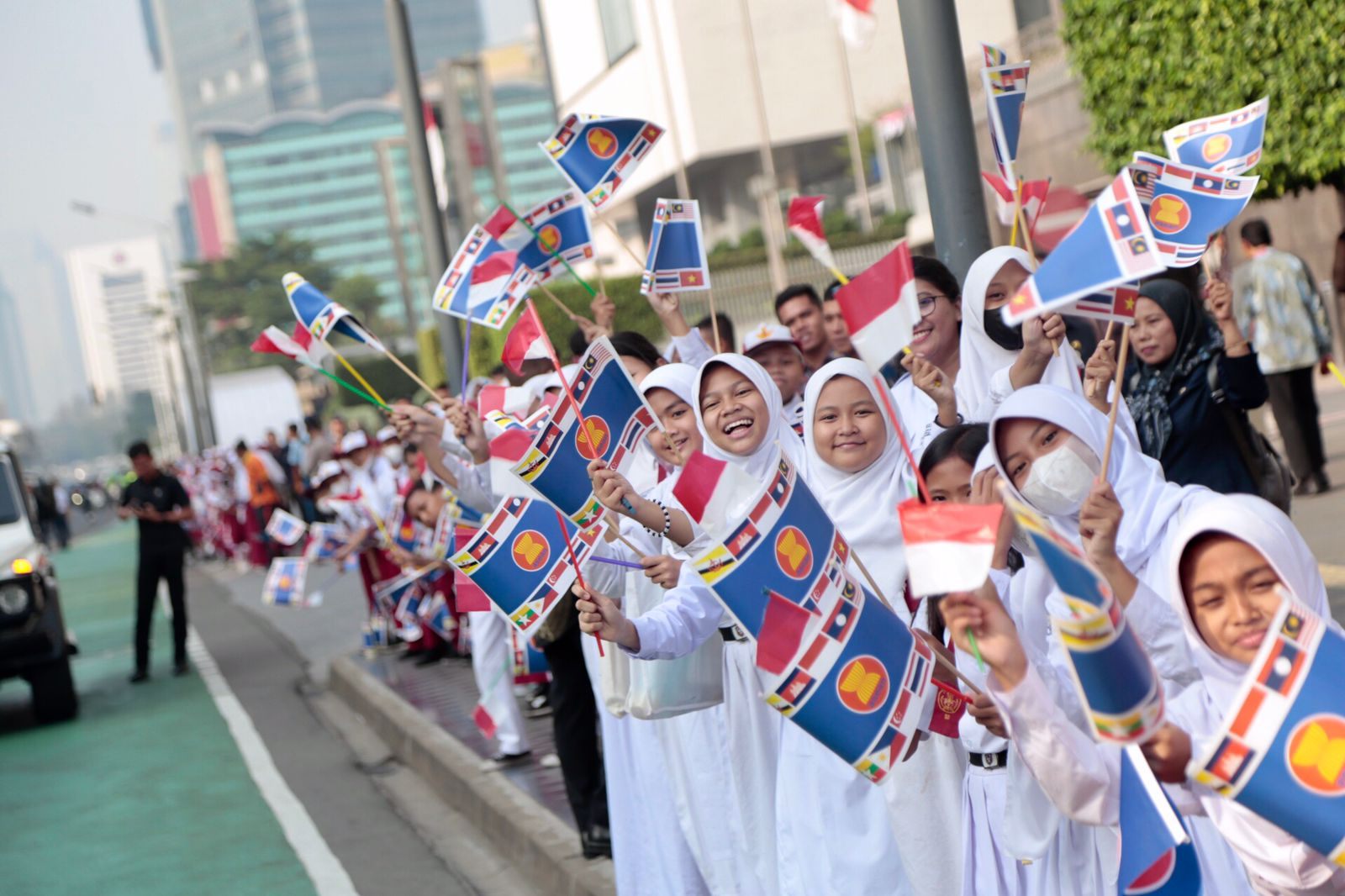
Indonesian students celebrate the 56th ASEAN Day in Central Jakarta, 8 August 2023.

The ASEAN Declaration marked the formal beginning of political cooperation among the five founding Southeast Asian states in the late Cold War context, and laid the foundation for regional confidence-building after decades of interstate suspicions and post-colonial instability. The document signalled a shared commitment to moderation, consultative diplomacy, peaceful coexistence, and the non-use of force as core principles of regional conduct. Its signing helped to normalise relations among former rivals such as Indonesia, Malaysia, and the Philippines, while also providing Thailand and Singapore a framework for collective political dialogue in a tense geopolitical environment.

The legacy of this initiative was institutionalised with the establishment of the ASEAN Secretariat in 1976 and the signing of key legal instruments such as the Treaty of Amity and Cooperation (TAC), the Declaration of ASEAN Concord (Bali Concord I). These agreements operationalised the ASEAN Declaration's commitments by formalising norms of non-interference, consensus-based decision-making, and cooperative problem-solving among member states. The TAC in particular became the central diplomatic code of conduct in Southeast Asia and a prerequisite for external partners to engage formally with ASEAN. Over the following decades, ASEAN expanded its membership to encompass all eleven states of Southeast Asia, advancing its founding objective of a region-wide political community. The Declaration's stronghold on unity and peaceful dialogue contributed to ASEAN's later role in facilitating broader Asia-Pacific architectures, including the ASEAN Regional Forum and the East Asia Summit and also economic facilitators such as the Asia-Pacific Economic Cooperation (APEC) and RCEP.

Today, August 8 is commemorated as ASEAN Day across Southeast Asia, honouring the signing of the Declaration in 1967 and symbolising the region's ongoing commitment to cooperation, stability, and shared identity. The outlier being Singapore, which celebrates ASEAN Day on the August 7th to prioritise National Day on August 9.

== See also ==
- Lam Thaen Guest House ‒ Regarded as the birthplace of ASEAN
- History of ASEAN
  - Accession of Sri Lanka to ASEAN ‒ originally invited as a founding member of ASEAN; rejected by Singapore.
- ASEAN Charter
- Domino Theory
