= Jembatan Baru (Transjakarta) =

Bus rapid transit station in Jakarta, Indonesia

3 05 Jembatan Baru
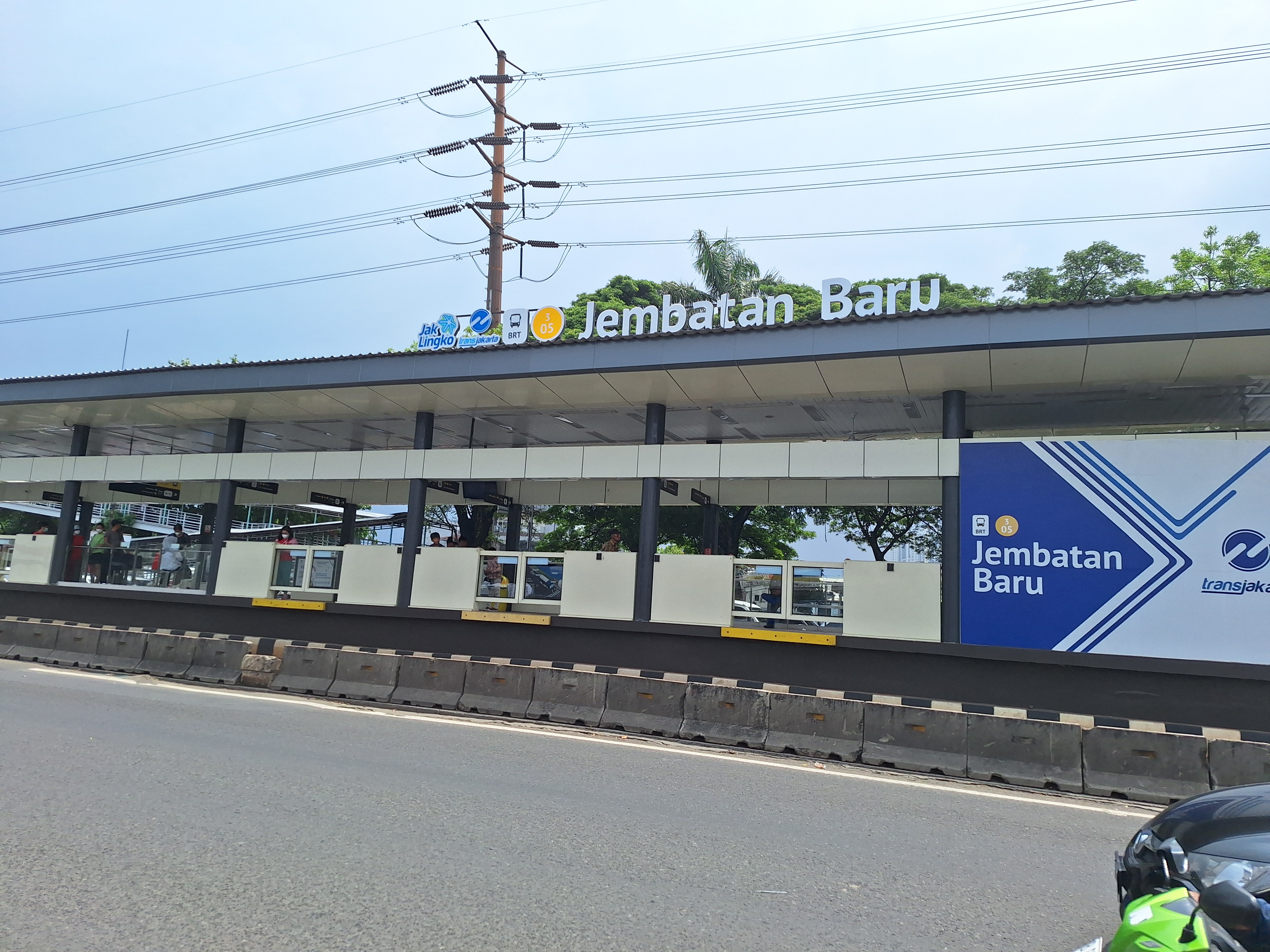

General information
- Location: Daan Mogot Street, Cengkareng Timur, Cengkareng, West Jakarta 11730, Indonesia
- Coordinates: 6.154850°S 106.730530°E
- System: Transjakarta bus rapid transit station
- Owner: Transjakarta
- Operator: Transjakarta
- Lines: List of Transjakarta corridors#Cross-corridor routes List of Transjakarta corridors#Corridor 3
- Platforms: Single island platform

Construction
- Structure type: At-grade
- Cycle facilities: No

Other information
- Status: In service

History
- Opened: 15 January 2006
- Rebuilt: 21 October 2023

Services
Preceding		Following
Pulo Nangka towards Pulo Gadung	Corridor 2 Route 2A	Rawa Buaya Terminus
Rawa Buaya towards Kalideres	Corridor 3	Pulo Nangka towards Monumen Nasional
Rawa Buaya towards Kalideres	Corridor 3 Route 3F	Pulo Nangka towards Senayan Bank Jakarta
Location

Jembatan Baru is a Transjakarta bus rapid transit station located on Daan Mogot Street, Cengkareng Timur, Cengkareng, West Jakarta, Indonesia, serving Corridor 3. The station is located near Plaza Cengkareng Mall.

== History ==
The station opened on 15 January 2006 together with the rest of Corridor 3. On 1 June 2023, the station, alongside several other stations were closed for revitalisation works. Passengers were advised to use the adjacent Rawa Buaya and Pulo Nangka stations. The station reopened on 21 October 2023 for passenger service.

== Building and layout ==
The station features a similar design to that of Jembatan Gantung station, with six bus bays on each side of the platform. The new station also features accessible toilets and a prayer room (musala).

North	towards Monumen Nasional and towards Senayan Bank Jakarta		towards Pulo Gadung (Pulo Nangka) →
Island platform, doors open on the right hand side
South	← (Rawa Buaya)	towards Kalideres	towards Rawa Buaya

== Non-BRT bus services ==
The following is the list of non-BRT bus services serving areas around Jembatan Baru station, last updated on 23 March 2025:

Type	Route	Destination	Notes
Inner city feeder		Sentraland Cengkareng—Puri Indah Mall	Inside the station
Mikrotrans Jak Lingko		Rusun Flamboyan— Kalideres	Beneath the flyover
Mikrotrans Jak Lingko	JAK 50	Puri Kembangan—Kalideres	Beneath the flyover
Mikrotrans Jak Lingko	JAK 52	Muara Angke—Kalideres	Beneath the flyover
Mikrotrans Jak Lingko	JAK 79	Cengkareng—Tubagus Angke	Beneath the flyover
Mikrotrans Jak Lingko	JAK 80	Rawa Kompeni—Rawa Buaya	Beneath the flyover

== Incidents ==
On 1 January 2020, flooding occurred and submerged much of the Rawa Buaya subdistrict of Cengkareng. The station was closed and used as a refuge camp, and services were shortened. A similar incident occurred earlier on 20 January 2014, where the station was also used as a refuge camp.
