= Sawah Besar (Transjakarta) =

Bus rapid transit station in Jakarta, Indonesia

1 16 Sawah Besar
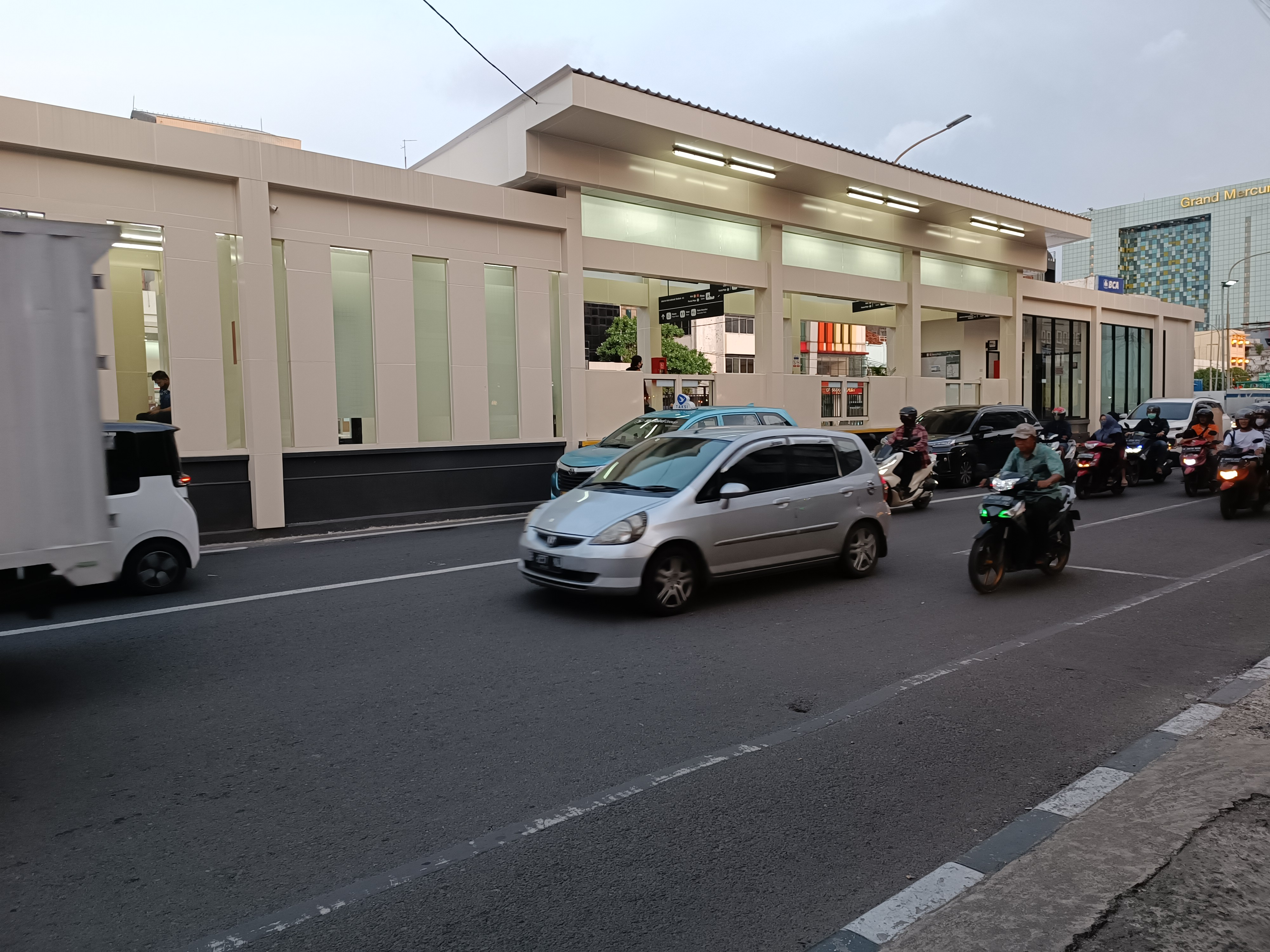
- West temporary building, 2023

General information
- Location: Hayam Wuruk Road and Gajah Mada Road, Kebon Kelapa, Gambir, Central Jakarta 10120, Jakarta, Indonesia
- System: Transjakarta bus rapid transit station
- Owner: Transjakarta
- Operator: Transjakarta
- Lines: List of Transjakarta corridors#Corridor 1 List of Transjakarta corridors#Cross-corridor routes
- Platforms: Two island platforms with separate paid area per platform (one in service, one unused)

Construction
- Structure type: At-grade
- Cycle facilities: No

Other information
- Status: In service with temporary building

History
- Opened: 15 January 2004 (soft launch); 1 February 2004 (commercial operational)
- Closed: 4 March 2023 (original building)

Services
Preceding		Following
Harmoni towards Blok M	Corridor 1	Mangga Besar towards Kali Besar
Harmoni towards Damai	Corridor 3 Route 3H	Mangga Besar towards Kota
Location

Sawah Besar is a Transjakarta bus rapid transit station located in Kebon Kelapa, Gambir, Central Jakarta, serving Corridor 1. It is located on Gajah Mada and Hayam Wuruk Roads, separated by the Ciliwung River. Despite its name, the station is not located within the Sawah Besar district.

== History ==
Sawah Besar BRT station was opened together with the entire Corridor 1 on 15 January 2004. It used to be located adjacent to the Gajah Mada Plaza shopping mall to the west, and an intersection between Gajah Mada and Hayam Wuruk Roads, Kyai H. Zainul Arifin Street and Sukarjo Wiryopranoto Street to the north. The station consisted of two separate side buildings, accessible via a skybridge.

On 28 February 2023, the station was moved to a pair of temporary buildings as construction of the Jakarta MRT progressed; Harmoni was originally scheduled to be relocated together with Sawah Besar and Mangga Besar, but was later postponed to 4 March.

== Building and layout ==
Alongside Harmoni and Mangga Besar, Sawah Besar BRT station has been operating with a pair of separated temporary buildings in the form of an island platform since 23 February 2023. Each is connected by a temporary bridge across the Ciliwung River and accessible with pelican crossings. The west building at Jalan Gajah Mada serves northbound buses, while the east building on Jalan Hayam Wuruk serves southbound buses. As of 26 August 2023, the west building is currently inactive due to a traffic diversion to make way for the MRT construction, with the east building now serving both directions.

West temporary building
West temporary building	Inactive island platform
Ciliwung River
East temporary building	towards Kota	(Mangga Besar) →
East temporary building	Island platform, doors open on the right-hand side
East temporary building	← (Harmoni)	towards Blok M dan towards Damai

== Non-BRT bus services ==
Type	Route	Destination	Notes
Transjakarta Non-BRT		Pantai Maju—Balai Kota	Inside the station

== Gallery ==
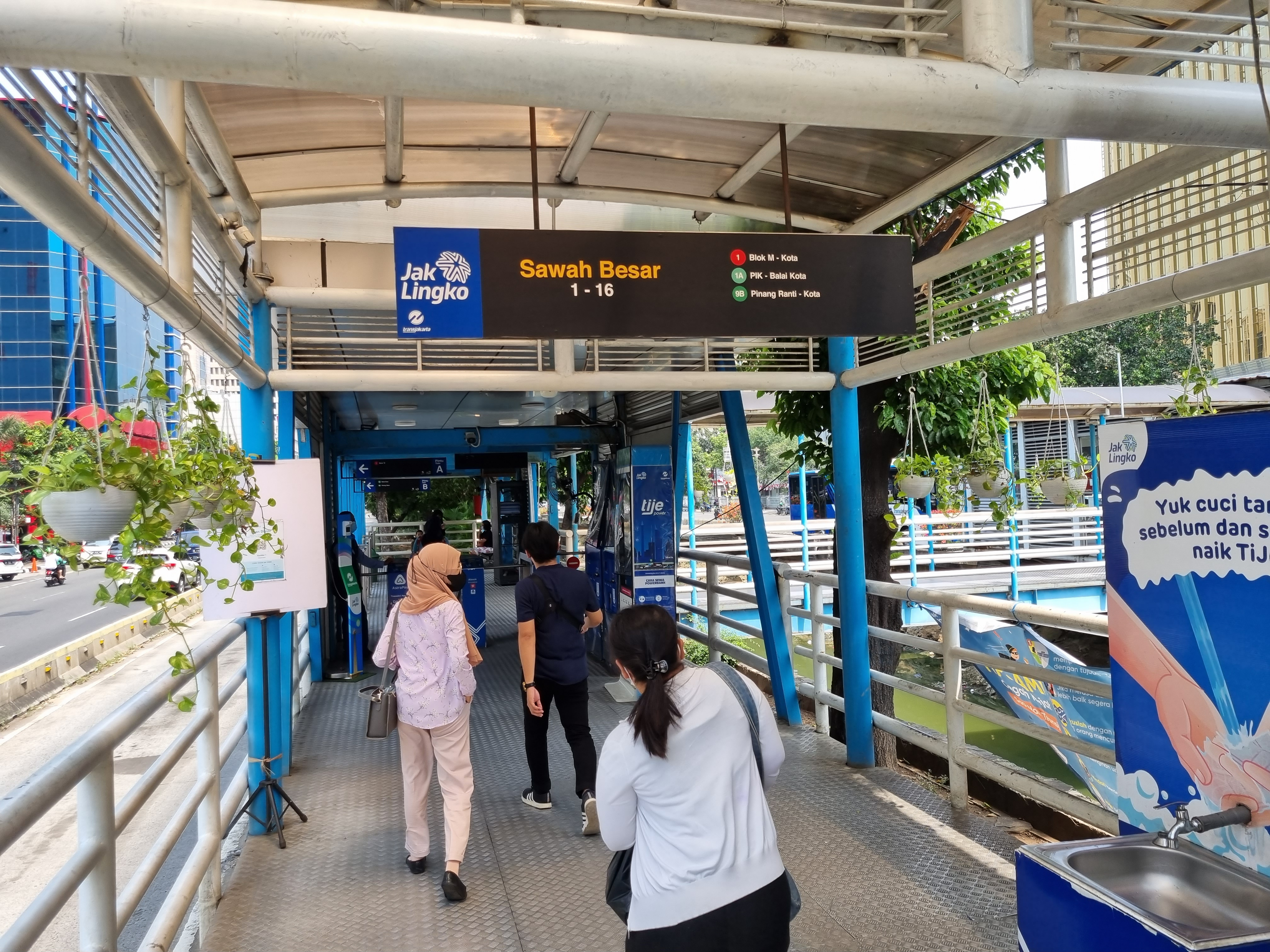
Entrance of the original station building, 2022

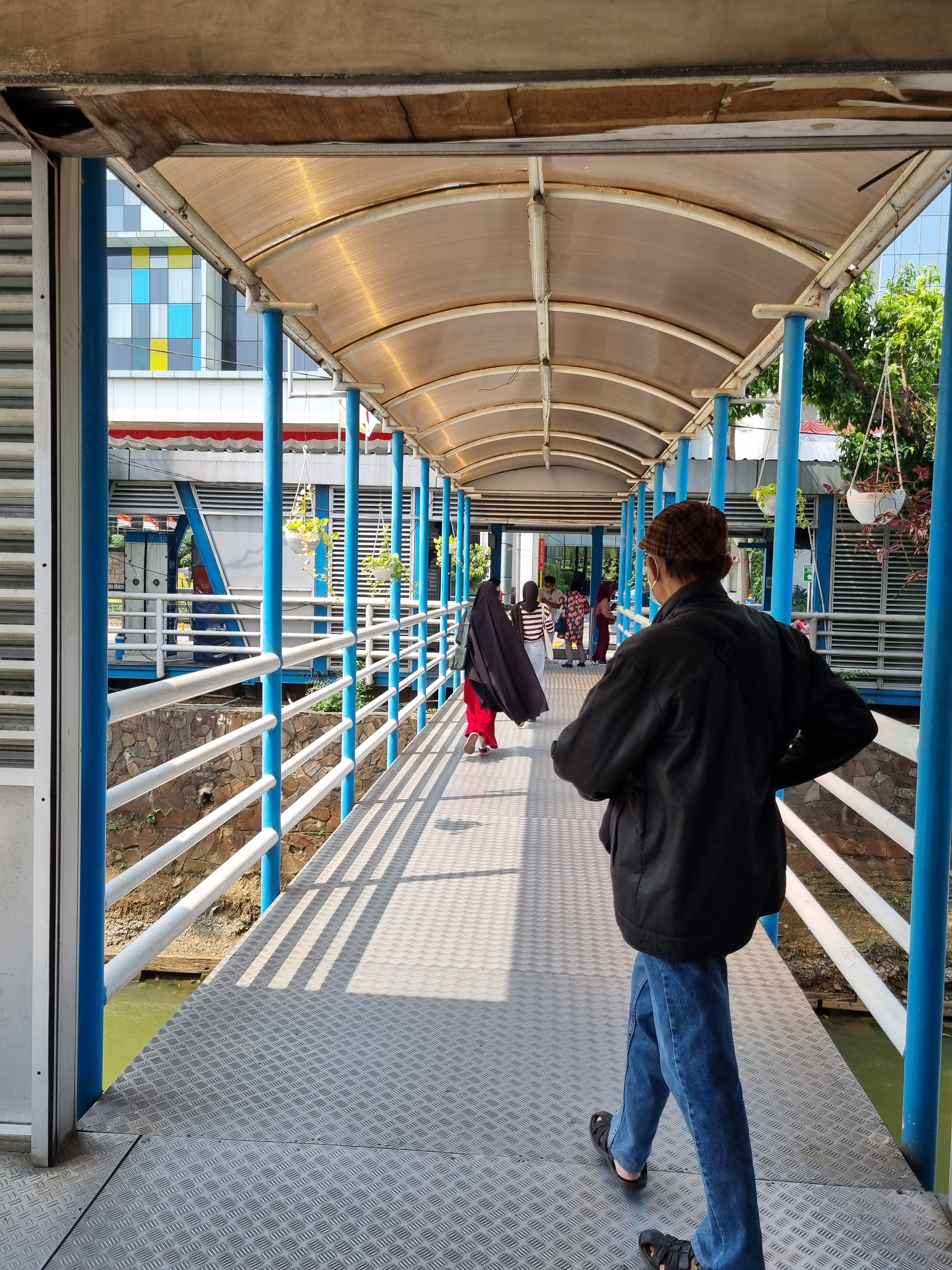
The original building's bridge above the canal, connecting two side platforms, 2022
