= Damai (Transjakarta) =

Bus rapid transit station in Jakarta, Indonesia

3 09 8 17 Damai
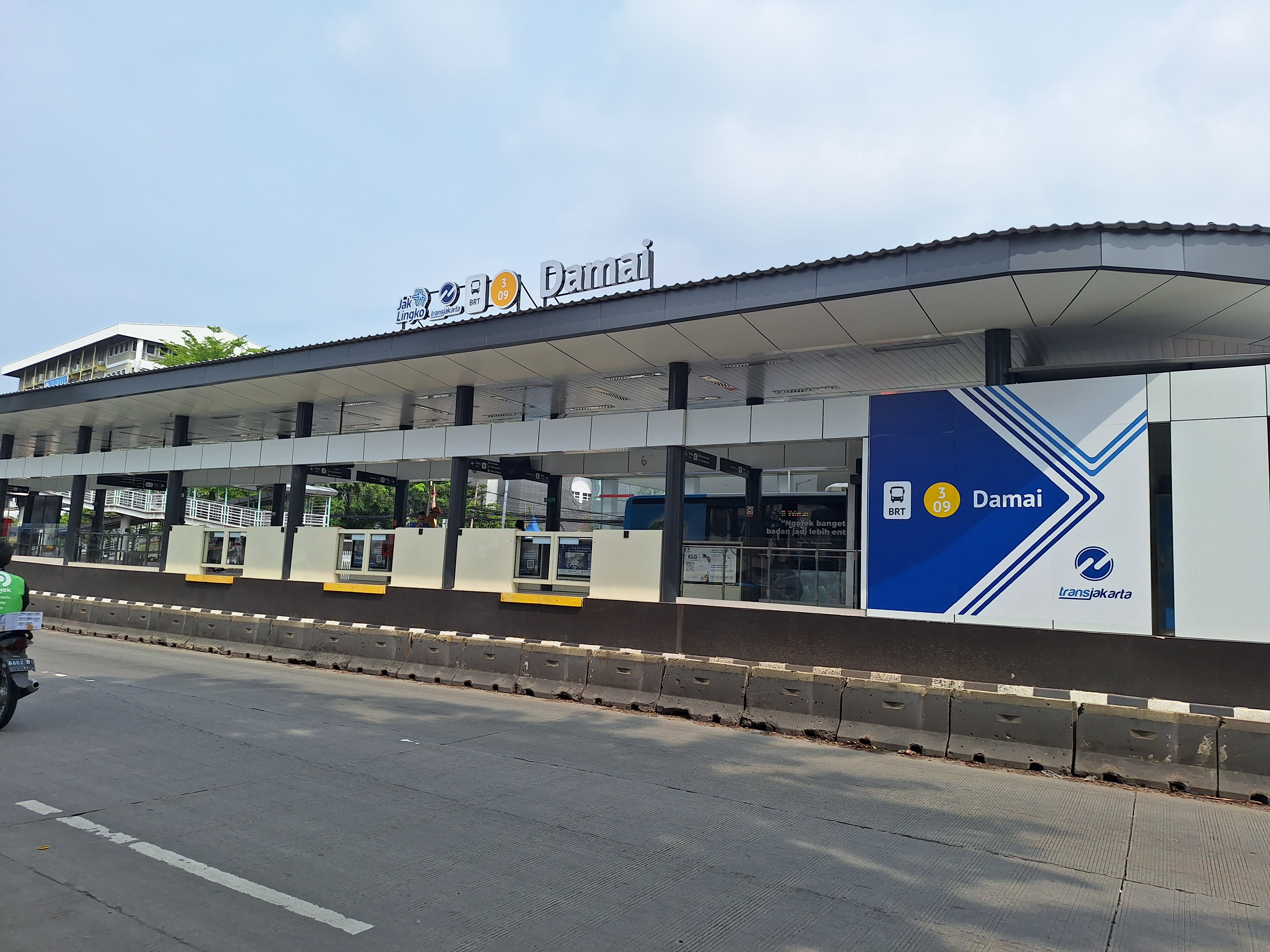

General information
- Location: Daan Mogot Street, Wijaya Kusuma, Grogol Petamburan, West Jakarta 11460, Indonesia
- Coordinates: 6.163460°S 106.775380°E
- System: Transjakarta bus rapid transit station
- Owner: Transjakarta
- Operator: Transjakarta
- Lines: List of Transjakarta corridors#Cross-corridor routes List of Transjakarta corridors#Corridor 3 List of TransJakarta corridors#Corridor 8
- Platforms: Single island platform

Construction
- Structure type: At-grade
- Cycle facilities: No

Other information
- Status: In service

History
- Opened: 15 January 2006
- Rebuilt: 15 June 2024
- Former names: Indosiar

Services
Preceding		Following
Jelambar towards Pulo Gadung	Corridor 2 Route 2A	Taman Kota towards Rawa Buaya
Taman Kota towards Kalideres	Corridor 3	Jelambar towards Monumen Nasional
Taman Kota towards Kalideres	Corridor 3 Route 3F	Jelambar towards Senayan Bank Jakarta
Terminus	Corridor 3 Route 3H Terminus	Jelambar towards Kota
Kedoya towards Lebak Bulus	Corridor 8 via Tomang	Jelambar towards Pasar Baru
Kedoya towards Lebak Bulus	Corridor 8 via Cideng	Jelambar towards Pasar Baru
Location

Damai (formerly Indosiar) is a Transjakarta bus rapid transit station located on Daan Mogot Street, Wijaya Kusuma, Grogol Petamburan, West Jakarta, Indonesia, serving Corridors 3 and 8. It is named after a small street opposite the station. The station is adjacent with the television studios of Indosiar (hence its former name), as well as its parent company Emtek.

On 6 November 2023, the then-named Indosiar station was closed for revitalisation works. It reopened on 15 June 2024 as Damai station. The station was renamed during the revitalisation process in late December 2023.

== Building and layout ==
When it was first opened, it had one bus bay on each side and was accessible through a skybridge. Due to the roadworks that increased the elevation of Daan Mogot Street, the old station platform was no longer level with the buses, so the station was extended with a new platform and the old platform fell into disuse.

After revitalisation works, the station has a similar design to that of Grogol station, with six bus bays on each side of the platform. It also has disabled-friendly toilets and praying rooms.

North	towards Pulo Gadung, towards Monumen Nasional, and towards Senayan Bank Jakarta		towards Pasar Baru	(Jelambar) →
Side platform, doors open on the right
South	← (Taman Kota) ↓ (Kedoya)	towards Lebak Bulus	towards Rawa Buaya and towards Kalideres

== Non-BRT bus services ==
Type	Route	Destination	Notes
Mikrotrans Jak Lingko	JAK 56	Grogol–Srengseng via Greenville Street	Outside the station

== Gallery ==
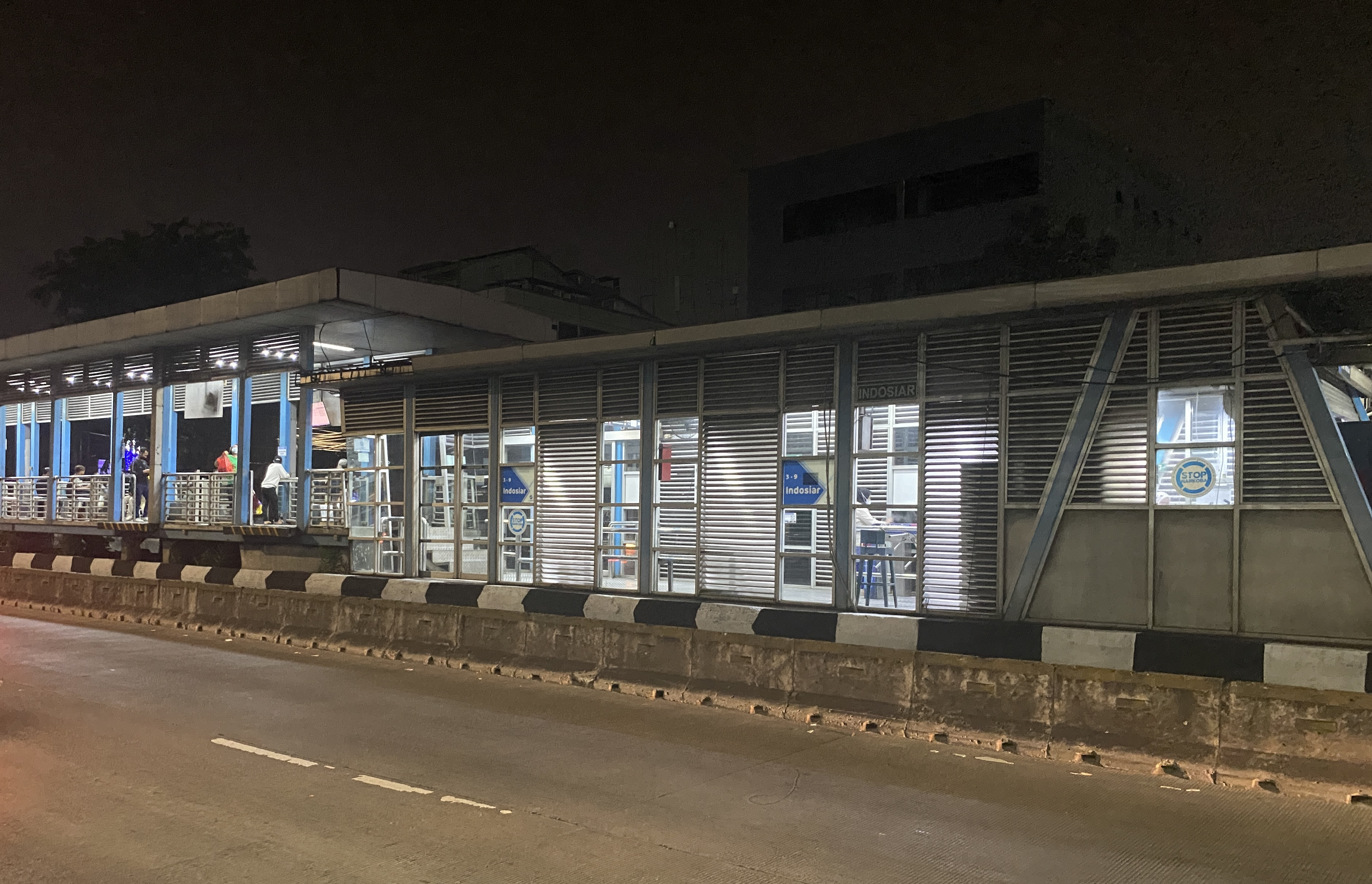
Damai station, then named Indosiar, before revitalisation works

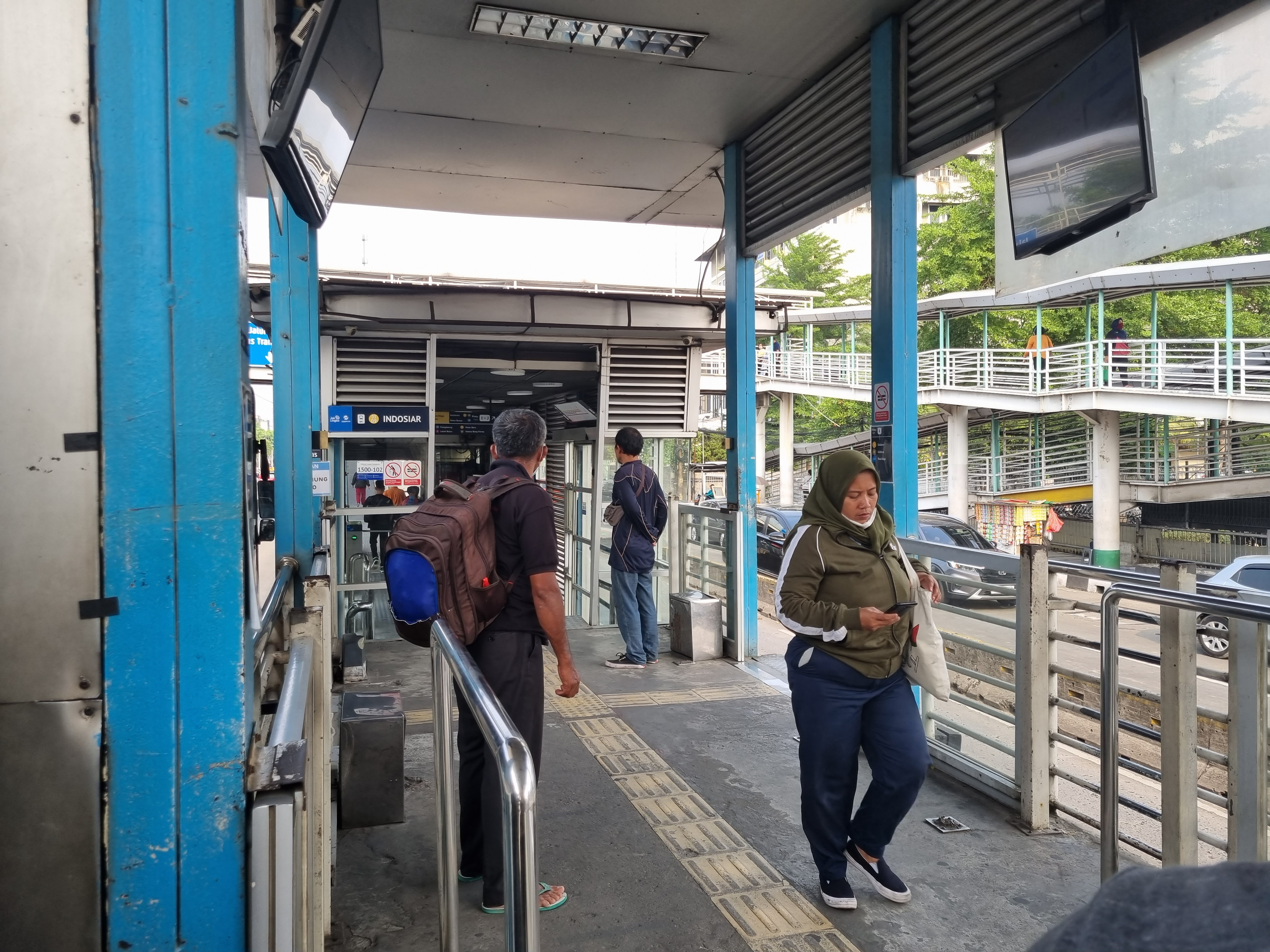
Interior of the then-named Indosiar station, prior to revitalisation

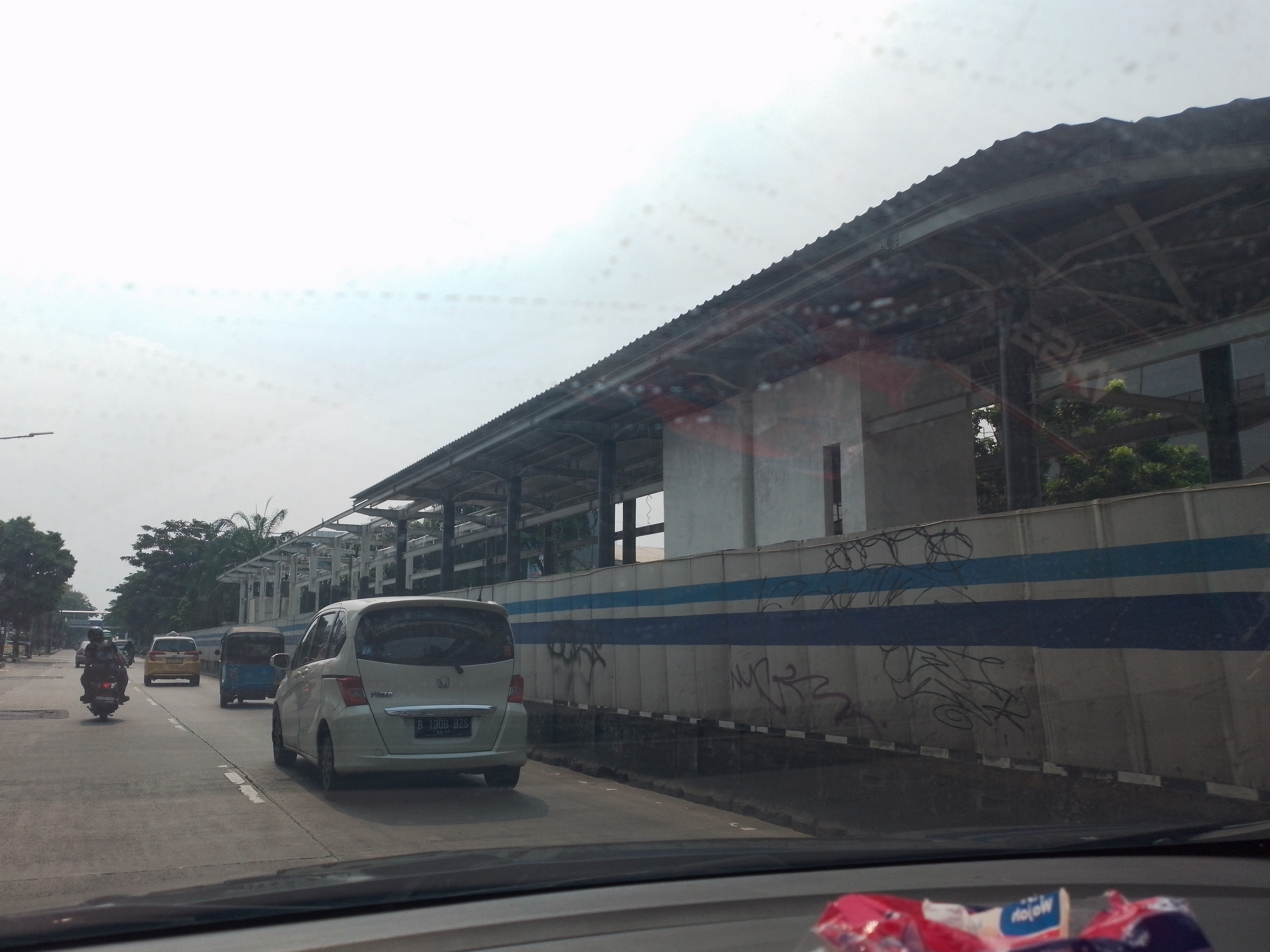
Damai station under construction

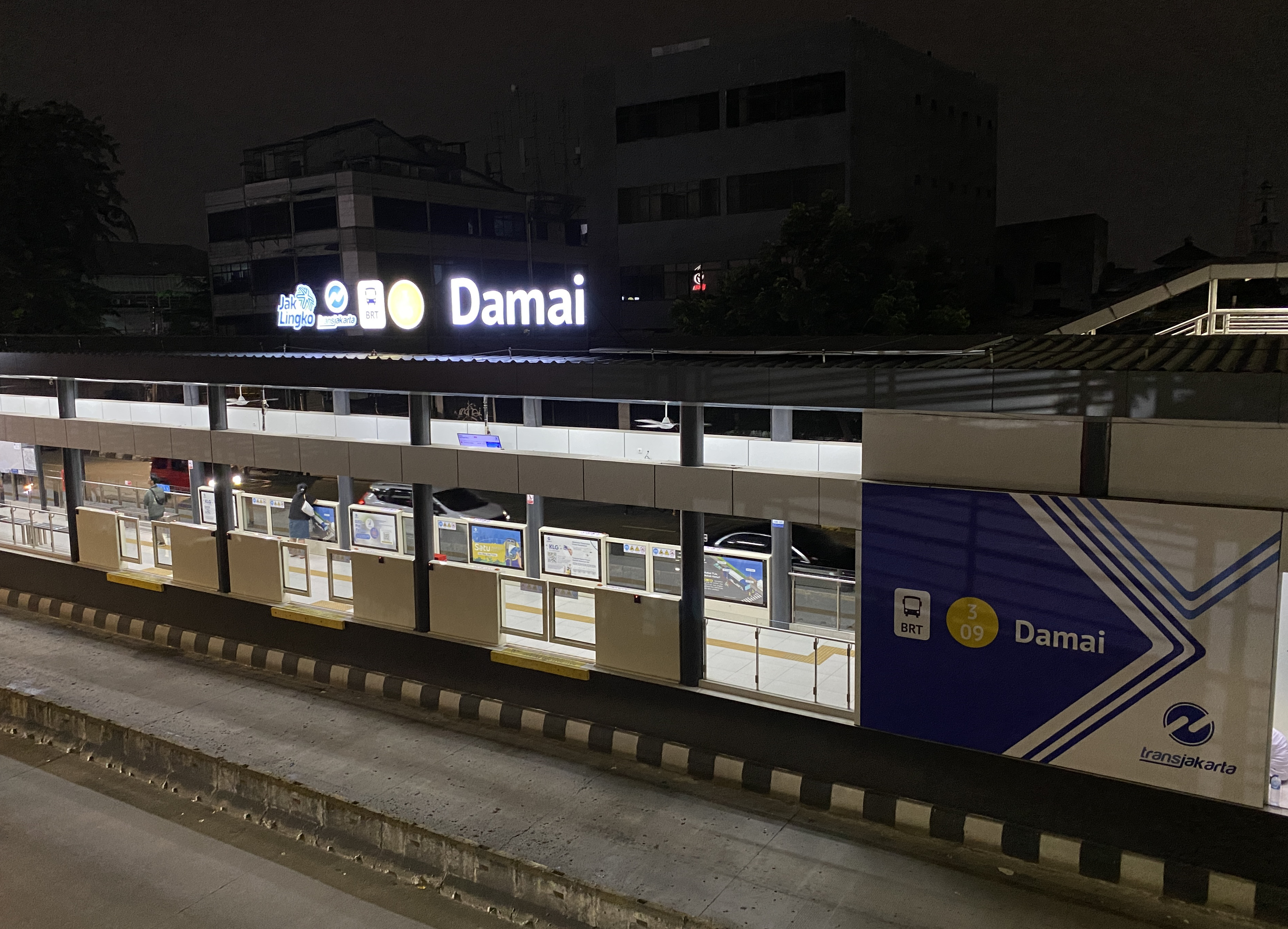
Damai station at night
