= Transjakarta Corridor 3 =

Bus rapid transit route in Indonesia

- Kalideres – Monumen Nasional
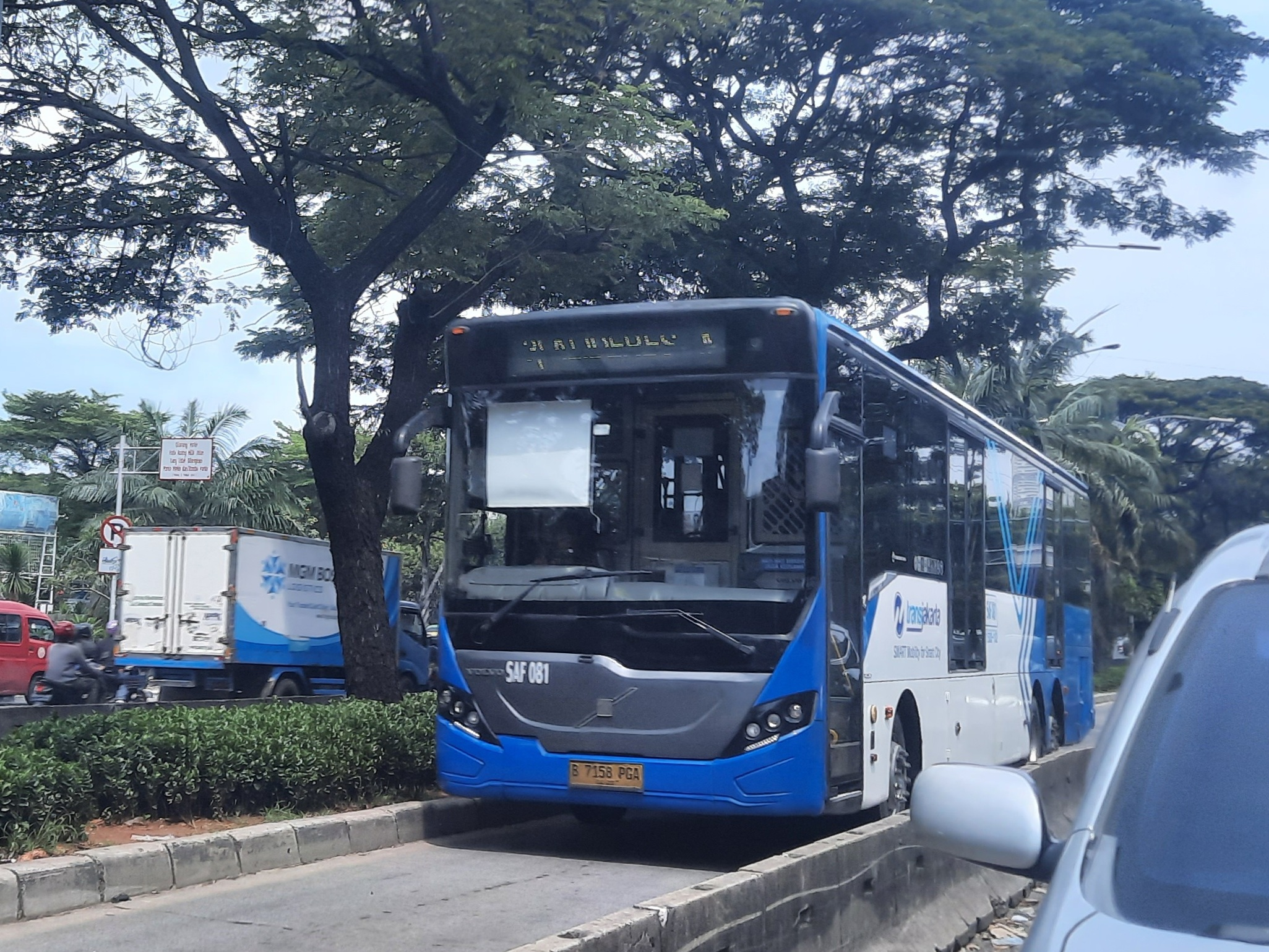
- The Volvo B11R bus fleet of Corridor 3 at Jalan Daan Mogot

Overview
- System: Transjakarta
- Operator: PT. Transportasi Jakarta (TJ, infrastructures and staffs); Mayasari Bakti (MB/MYS, fleets and drivers); Bianglala Metropolitan (BMP, fleets and drivers); Steady Safe (SAF, fleets and drivers)
- Began service: January 15, 2006

Route
- Route type: Street-level Bus Rapid Transit
- Locale: Central Jakarta; West Jakarta
- Length: 16.14 km
- Stations: 16 (original); 14 (current temporary adjustment)

Transjakarta Corridor 3 is a bus rapid transit corridor in Jakarta, Indonesia, operated by Transjakarta. It runs from the Kalideres Bus Terminal in West Jakarta to the Monumen Nasional BRT station in Central Jakarta.

The route passes through Daan Mogot, Kyai Tapa, Hasyim Ashari, Cideng Barat, Cideng Timur, Veteran, and Medan Merdeka Barat Streets. It is integrated with the Tangerang Line of the KRL Commuterline at Taman Kota Station via the Taman Kota BRT station, and at Pesing Station via the Damai BRT station.

Until March 3, 2023, Corridor 3 ran from Kalideres to the Pasar Baru BRT station. Due to the construction of the Jakarta MRT North–South Line extension, Corridor 3 temporarily relocated its eastern terminus to Monumen Nasional from May 29, 2023. As a result, it no longer serves Pecenongan, Juanda, and Pasar Baru BRT stations, which are now served by temporarily extended Corridor 8.

== History ==
=== Early operational ===
Corridor 3 was inaugurated alongside Corridor 2 on January 15, 2006, both of which were met with strong public enthusiasm. It was initially targeted that 71 new buses would serve Corridors 2 and 3 by April 2006, three months after the start of operations. Corridor 3 operated along the Kalideres–Pasar Baru route until it was temporarily adjusted in 2023.

=== 24-hour service ===
Corridors 1, 3, and 9 were the first Transjakarta corridors to begin 24-hour operations on June 1, 2014. At the time, only selected stations offered the 24-hour service. All stations later began serving 24-hour operations. Corridor 3 now serves all of its stations round-the-clock.

=== Bus station revitalization ===
On December 16, 2020, as part of efforts to improve service quality, the eastern terminus of Corridor 3 at the time—Pasar Baru BRT station— was closed for revitalisation works. It reopened one month later on January 16, 2021. The revitalisation of Pasar Baru station also marked the beginning of a revitalisation programme to rebuild 46 BRT stations between 2021 and 2023.

Following the revitalisation of Pasar Baru station, Jembatan Gantung BRT station was temporarily closed for revitalisation works on September 5, 2022, followed by Kalideres BRT station the next day. The revitalised Jembatan Gantung station reopened on April 6, 2023, with Kalideres following on July 23, 2023.

On June 1, 2023, Jembatan Baru BRT station was closed for revitalisation, followed two days later by Grogol 1 station (now known as Grogol), alongside its Corridor 9 counterpart Grogol 2 (now known as Grogol Reformasi). Jembatan Baru station reopened on October 21, 2023. Grogol station reopened on November 4, 2023.

=== Temporary readjustment ===
On March 4, 2023, due to the construction of Phase 2A of the Jakarta MRT, Harmoni BRT station—which served Corridors 1, 2, 3, and 8—was relocated to a temporary structure with limited capacity that could only serve Corridor 1 passengers. To prevent overcrowding at Pasar Baru station, caused by the high passenger volume from Corridors 3 and 8, Transjakarta decided to reroute Corridor 3 along the southbound Corridor 1 route, bypassing Monumen Nasional and terminating at Bundaran HI BRT station. As a result, Corridor 3 could no longer serve Pecenongan, Juanda, and Pasar Baru stations, which were taken over by the temporarily extended Corridor 8.

However, on May 29, 2023, Corridor 3 was shortened to terminate at Monumen Nasional station to in order to reduce headways. Additionally, Transjakarta also began operating Route 3H (Damai–Kota) to facilitate transfers between Corridor 3 and the northbound Corridor 1 route. This temporary readjustment will remain in effect until the completion of the MRT construction works, either in 2027 or 2029.

== List of BRT stations ==
- Due to the construction of Phase 2A of the Jakarta MRT, Corridor 3 terminates at Monumen Nasional since May 29, 2023. It no longer serves Harmoni, Pecenongan, Juanda, and Pasar Baru stations—the first is now served only by Corridor 1, while the latter three are served by the extended Corridor 8. This arrangement will remain in effect until the completion of the MRT construction, which is expected in either 2027 or 2029.
- All stations are served by buses 24 hours a day.

Corridor 3 (Kalideres – Monumen Nasional)
Code	Station name	Transfer/Notes	Bus terminal or train station nearby
Stations in order: From top to bottom (downwards) towards Monumen Nasional (→); from bottom to top (upwards) towards Kalideres (←)
3 01	Kalideres	Two separate buildings for opposing directions require exiting paid area to transfer: Eastbound: Towards Monumen Nasional (→); Westbound: Arrivals only	Kalideres Bus Terminal
3 01	Kalideres	Kalideres	Kalideres Bus Terminal
3 02	Pesakih	Pesakih	
3 03	Sumur Bor	Sumur Bor	
3 04	Rawa Buaya	Rawa Buaya	
3 05	Jembatan Baru	Jembatan Baru	
3 06	Pulo Nangka	Pulo Nangka	
3 07	Jembatan Gantung	Jembatan Gantung	
3 08	Taman Kota	Taman Kota	Taman Kota
3 09 8 17	Damai	Damai	Pesing
3 10 8 18	Jelambar	Jelambar	
3 11	Grogol	Grogol Grogol Reformasi (via skybridge)	Grogol (Planned) Grogol Bus Terminal
3 12	Roxy	Roxy	
8 23	Petojo	Petojo	
1 14 2 21	Monumen Nasional	Monumen Nasional	Monas (U/C)

== Cross-corridor routes ==
=== Route 3F (Kalideres – Senayan Bank Jakarta) ===
- Stations indicated by a → sign have a one-way service towards Senayan Bank Jakarta only.

Route 3F (Kalideres – Senayan Bank Jakarta)
Code	Station name	Transfer/Notes	Bus terminal or train station nearby
Stations in order: From top to bottom (downwards) towards Senayan Bank Jakarta (→); from bottom to top (upwards) towards Kalideres (←)
3 01	Kalideres	Two separate buildings for opposing directions require exiting paid area to transfer: Eastbound: Towards Senayan Bank Jakarta (→); Westbound: Arrivals only	Kalideres Bus Terminal
3 01	Kalideres	Kalideres	Kalideres Bus Terminal
3 02	Pesakih	Pesakih	
3 03	Sumur Bor	Sumur Bor	
3 04	Rawa Buaya	Rawa Buaya	
3 05	Jembatan Baru	Jembatan Baru	
3 06	Pulo Nangka	Pulo Nangka	
3 07	Jembatan Gantung	Jembatan Gantung	
3 08	Taman Kota	Taman Kota	Taman Kota
3 09 8 17	Damai	Damai	Pesing
3 10 8 18	Jelambar	Jelambar	
8 19 9 20	Grogol Reformasi →	Grogol Reformasi Grogol (via skybridge)	
Towards Kalideres (←) heads straight to Jelambar
8 20 9 19	Tanjung Duren	Two separate buildings for opposing directions require exiting paid area to transfer: Eastbound: Towards Senayan Bank Jakarta (→); Westbound: Towards Kalideres (←)	Taman Anggrek (planned)
8 20 9 19	Tanjung Duren	Tanjung Duren	Taman Anggrek (planned)
9 18	Kota Bambu	Two separate buildings for opposing directions require exiting paid area to transfer: Northbound: Towards Kalideres (←); Southbound: Towards Senayan Bank Jakarta (→)	
9 18	Kota Bambu	Kota Bambu	
9 17	Kemanggisan	Two separate buildings for opposing directions require exiting paid area to transfer: Northbound: Towards Kalideres (←); Southbound: Towards Senayan Bank Jakarta (→)	
9 17	Kemanggisan	Kemanggisan	
9 16	Petamburan	Petamburan	
9 15	Gerbang Pemuda	Two separate buildings for opposing directions require exiting paid area to transfer: Eastbound: Towards Senayan Bank Jakarta (→); Westbound: Towards Kalideres (←)	
9 15	Gerbang Pemuda	Gerbang Pemuda	
1 05	Senayan Bank Jakarta	Senayan Bank Jakarta	

=== Route 3H (Damai – Kota) ===
- Stations indicated by a → sign have a one-way service towards Kota only.

Route 3H (Damai – Kota)
Code	Station name	Transfer/Notes	Bus terminal or train station nearby
Stations in order: From top to bottom (downwards) towards Kota (→); from bottom to top (upwards) towards Damai (←)
3 09 8 17	Damai	Damai	Pesing
3 10 8 18	Jelambar	Jelambar	
3 11	Grogol	Grogol Grogol Reformasi (via skybridge)	Grogol (Planned) Grogol Bus Terminal
3 12	Roxy	Roxy	
8 23	Petojo	Petojo	Petojo (planned)
1 15 2 20	Harmoni	Harmoni	Harmoni (U/C)
1 16	Sawah Besar	Sawah Besar	Sawah Besar (U/C)
1 17	Mangga Besar	Mangga Besar	Mangga Besar (U/C)
1 18	Taman Sari	Taman Sari	
1 19	Glodok	Glodok	Glodok (U/C)
1 21 12 22	Kali Besar →	Some buses terminate here and require all passengers to alight	
1 21 12 22	Kali Besar →	Kali Besar	
1 22 12 05	Museum Sejarah Jakarta →	Museum Sejarah Jakarta	
Towards Stasiun Pesing (←) heads straight to Glodok
1 20 12 06	Kota	Kota	Jakarta Kota Kota (U/C)

== Fleets ==
=== (Kalideres - Monumen Nasional) ===
Operator	Type	Caption	Image	Depots
Main BRT Fleet
Mayasari Bakti	Scania K310IB	operates every day (05:00–22:00 WIB)		Pulo Gadung
Mayasari Bakti	Scania K320IA	operates every day (05:00–22:00 WIB)		Pulo Gadung
Steady Safe	Volvo B11R	operates every day (05:00–22:00 WIB)		Kedaung Kali Angke
Bianglala Metropolitan	Mercedes-Benz OH 1626	Operates on night bus		Ciputat (South Tangerang City, Banten)
Reserve BRT Fleet
Swakelola Transjakarta	Hino RK1 JSNL	operates on weekdays (05:00–22:00 WIB)		Kedaung Kali Angke
Swakelola Transjakarta	Mercedes-Benz OC500	operates on weekdays (05:00–22:00 WIB)		Cawang
Swakelola Transjakarta	Scania K320IA	operates on weekdays (05:00–22:00 WIB)		Pulo Gadung
Perum DAMRI	Zhongtong Bus LCK6180GC	operates on weekdays (05:00–22:00 WIB)		Pulo Gadung
Mayasari Bakti	Scania K310IB	Operates on holiday (05:00–22:00 WIB)		Cijantung

=== (Kalideres - Senayan Bank Jakarta) ===
Operator	Type	Caption	Image	Depots
Main BRT Fleet
Steady Safe	Volvo B11R	operates every day (05:00–22:00 WIB)		Kedaung Kali Angke
Mayasari Bakti	Scania K310IB	operates every day (05:00–22:00 WIB)		Pulo Gadung
Mayasari Bakti	Scania K320IA	operates every day (05:00–22:00 WIB)		Pulo Gadung
Reserve BRT Fleet
Swakelola Transjakarta	Hino RK1 JSNL	operates every day (05:00–22:00 WIB)		Kedaung Kali Angke
Swakelola Transjakarta	Scania K320IA	operates every day (05:00–22:00 WIB)		Pulo Gadung
Perum DAMRI	Zhongtong Bus LCK6180GC	operates every day (05:00–22:00 WIB)		Pulo Gadung

=== (Damai - Kota) ===
Operator	Type	Caption	Image	Depots
Main BRT Fleet
Steady Safe	Volvo B11R	operates every day (05:00–22:00 WIB)		Kedaung Kali Angke
Reserve BRT Fleet
Swakelola Transjakarta	Hino RK1 JSNL	operates every day (05:00–22:00 WIB)		Kedaung Kali Angke
Swakelola Transjakarta	Mercedes-Benz OH 1526	operates every day (05:00–22:00 WIB)		Cawang
Swakelola Transjakarta	Mercedes-Benz OH 1626	operates every day (05:00–22:00 WIB)		Cawang

== See also ==
- Transjakarta
  - List of Transjakarta corridors
