= Kalideres (Transjakarta) =

Bus rapid transit station in Jakarta, Indonesia

3 01 Kalideres
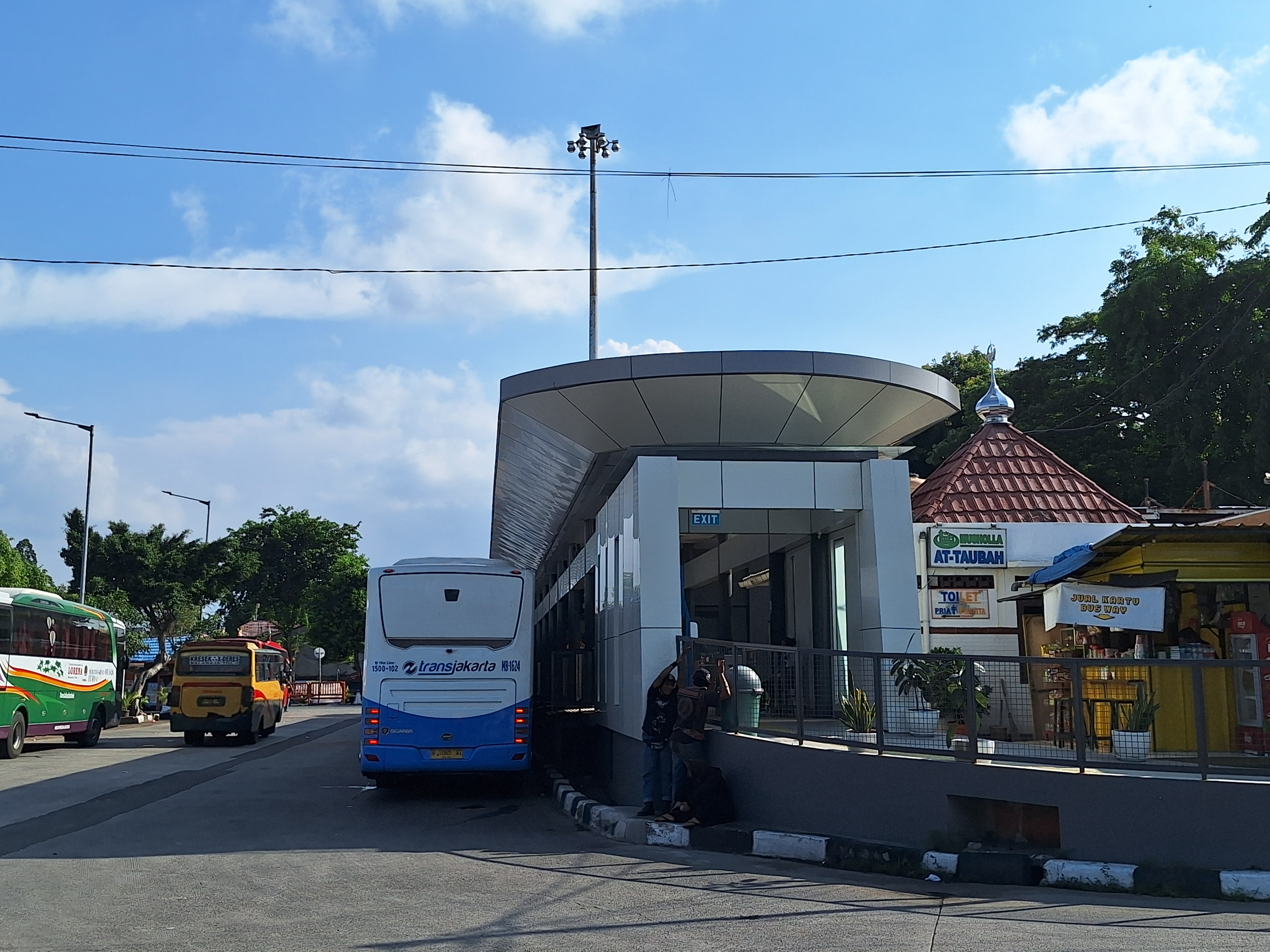

General information
- Location: Kalideres Bus Terminal; Daan Mogot Street, Kalideres, Kalideres, West Jakarta 11840, Indonesia
- Coordinates: 6.154868°S 106.706048°E
- System: Transjakarta bus rapid transit station
- Owner: Transjakarta
- Operator: Transjakarta
- Lines: List of Transjakarta corridors#Corridor 3 List of Transjakarta corridors#Cross-corridor routes
- Platforms: Two side platforms with separate paid area per platform

Construction
- Structure type: At-grade

Other information
- Status: In service

History
- Opened: 15 January 2006
- Rebuilt: 23 July 2023

Services
Preceding		Following
Terminus	Corridor 3 Terminus	Pesakih towards Monumen Nasional
Terminus	Corridor 3 Route 3F Terminus	Pesakih towards Senayan Bank Jakarta
Location

Kalideres is a Transjakarta bus rapid transit station located within the Kalideres Bus Terminal in Kalideres, West Jakarta, Indonesia. It is the western terminus of Corridor 3 towards Monumen Nasional.

On 6 September 2022, the station went out of service for revitalisation works. It was reopened on 23 July 2023.

== Building and layout ==
Before revitalisation works, there were two separate buildings: one for departure and another for arrival. However, the arrival platform did not receive adequate maintenance and suffered from structural ageing. The departure platform only had three bus bays.

After a 10-month-long revitalisation project, the new station reopened on 6 September 2022. The new station has six bus bays for each of the departure and arrival platforms, and features new facilities such as disabled-friendly toilets and praying rooms (musala).

However, after revitalisation works, it remains one of the few terminus stations which have separate paid areas for each departure and arrival platform, and as such, transferring requires tapping out and paying again.

West	Arrivals
Side platform, doors open on the right			Transfer linkway ⤸
Commercial area			Transfer linkway ⤸
Side platform, doors open on the right			Transfer linkway ⤸
East	← (Pesakih) towards Monumen Nasional towards Senayan Bank Jakarta	Waiting area	Transfer linkway ⤸

== Non-BRT bus services ==
The following non-BRT bus services stop around the Kalideres station, last updated on 31 July 2025:

Type	Route	Destination	Notes
Cross-border feeder (Transjabodetabek)		Kalideres—Soekarno–Hatta International Airport Office Complex	Outside the station
Mikrotrans Jak Lingko		Kalideres—Pesakih Housing Blocks	Outside the station
Mikrotrans Jak Lingko	JAK 50	Kalideres—Puri Indah Mall	Outside the station
Mikrotrans Jak Lingko	JAK 52	Kalideres—Muara Angke	Outside the station

== Gallery ==
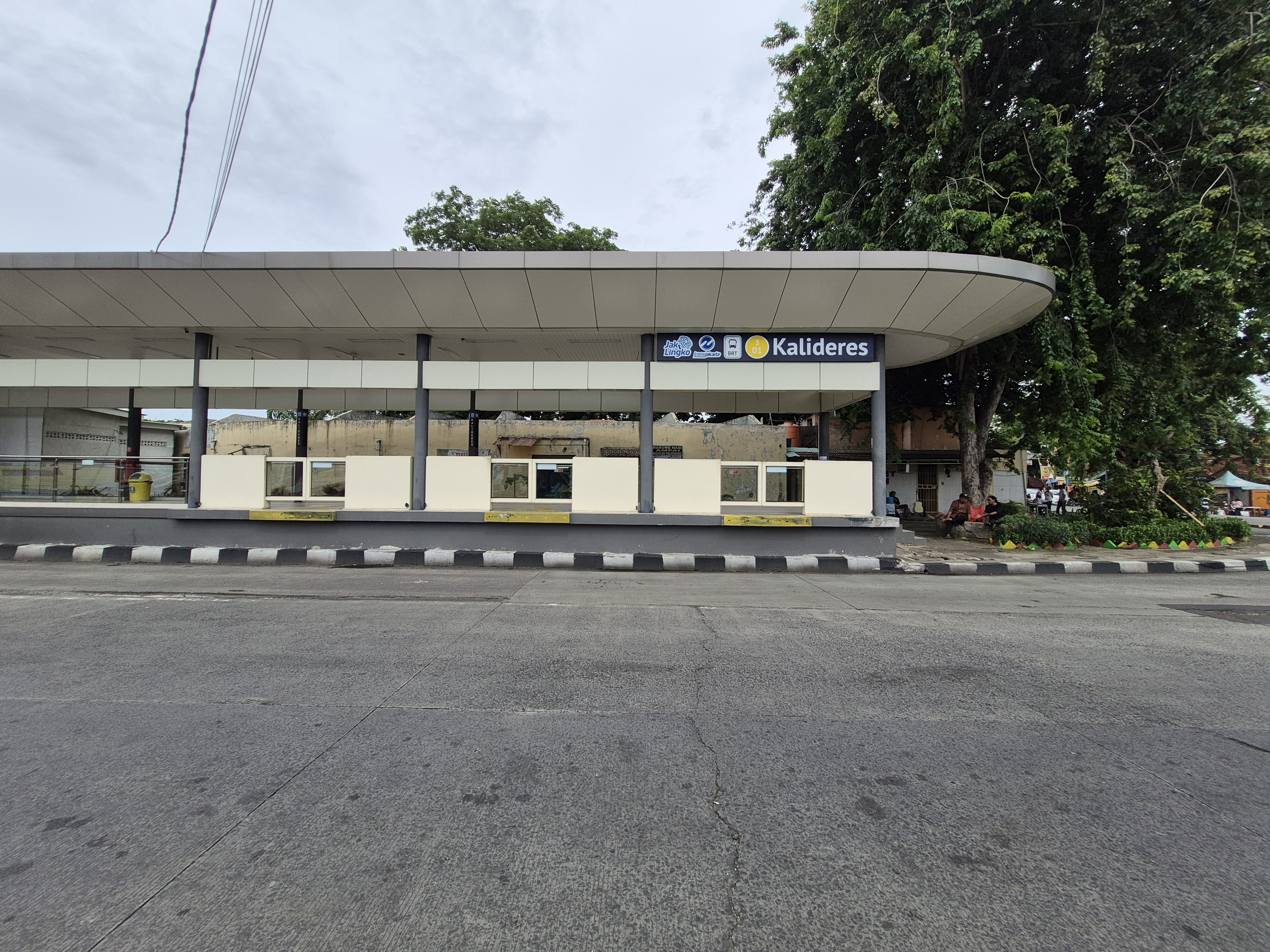
Arrival platform, 2025

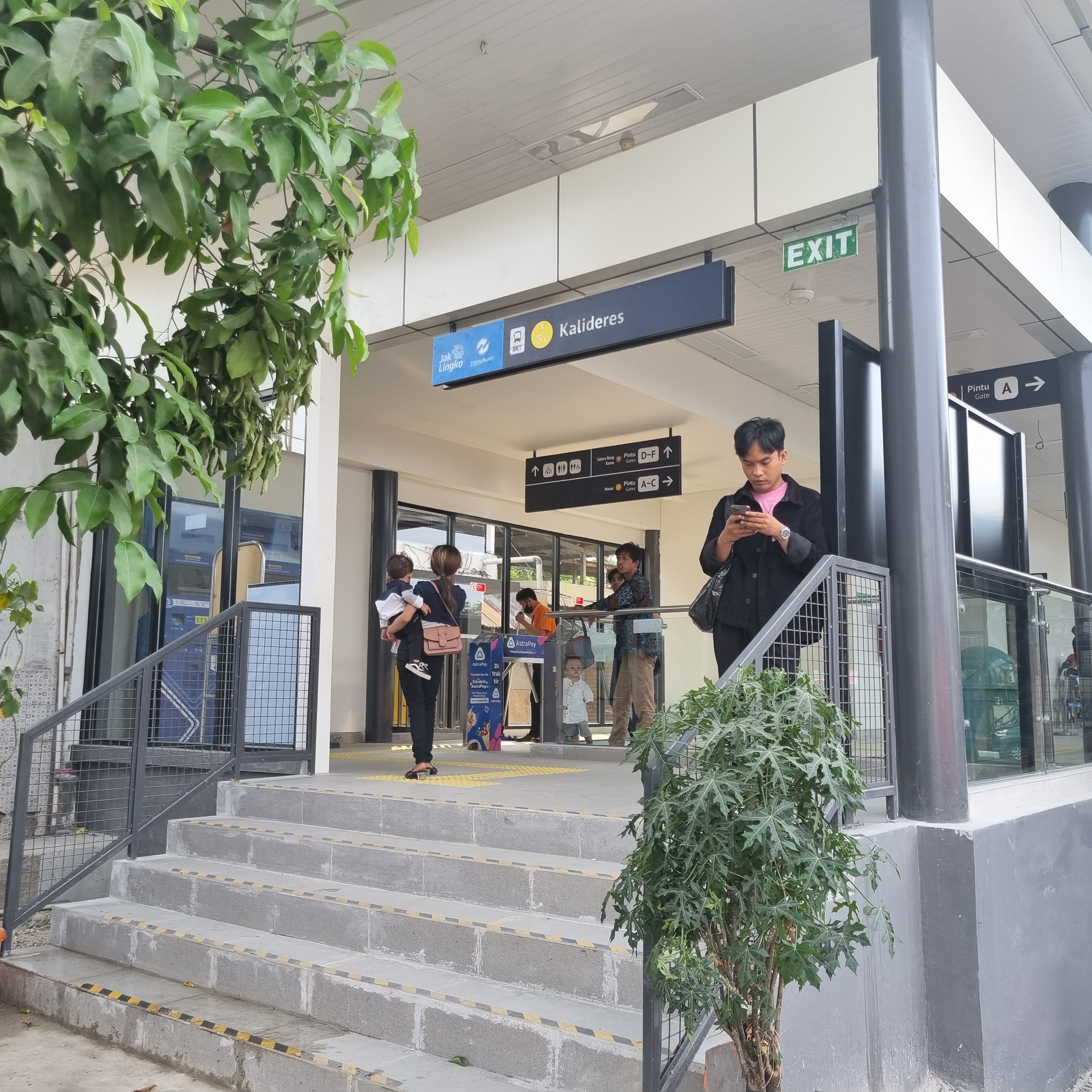
Entrance of the arrival platform

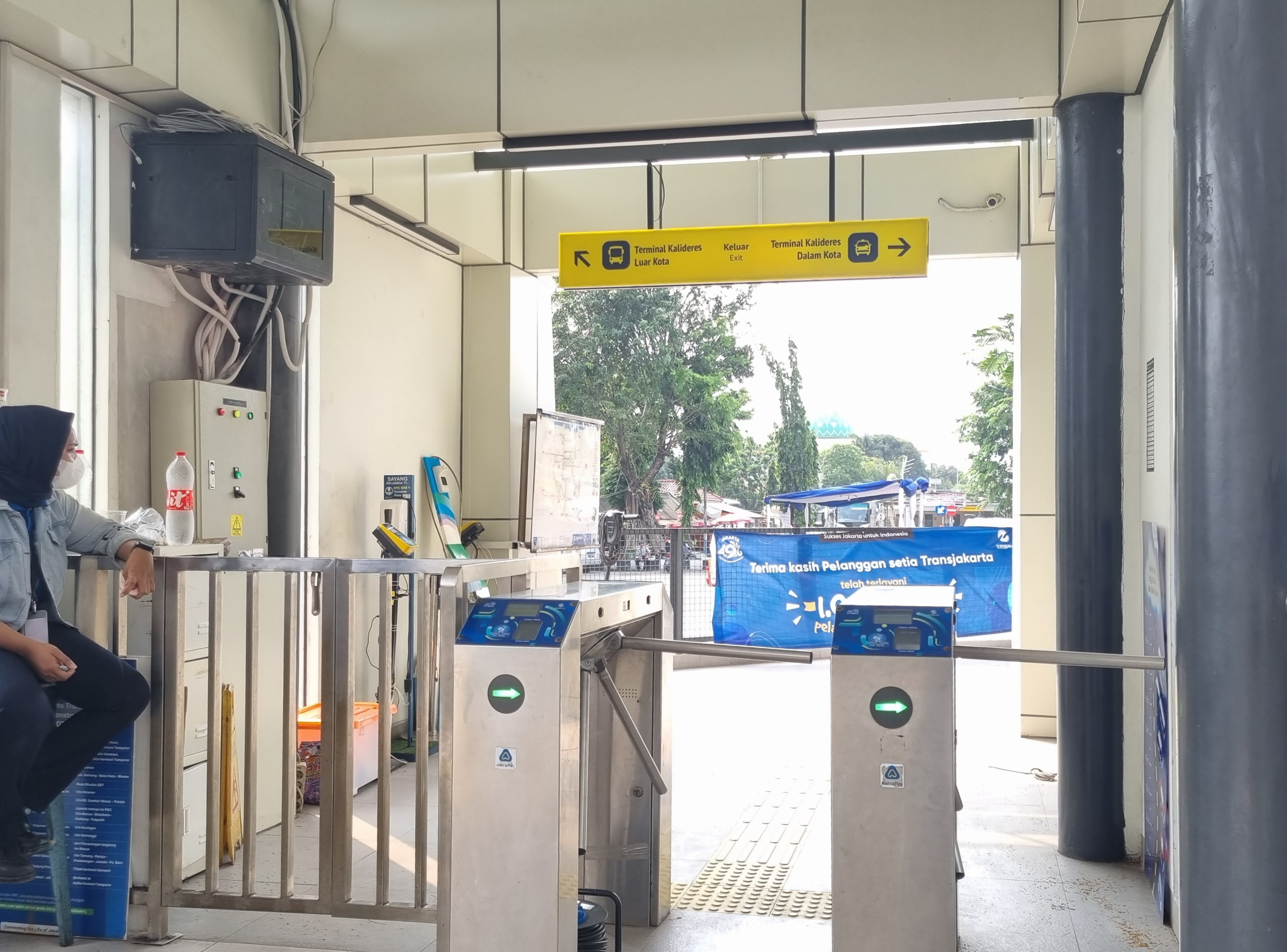
Faregates to exit the arrival platform

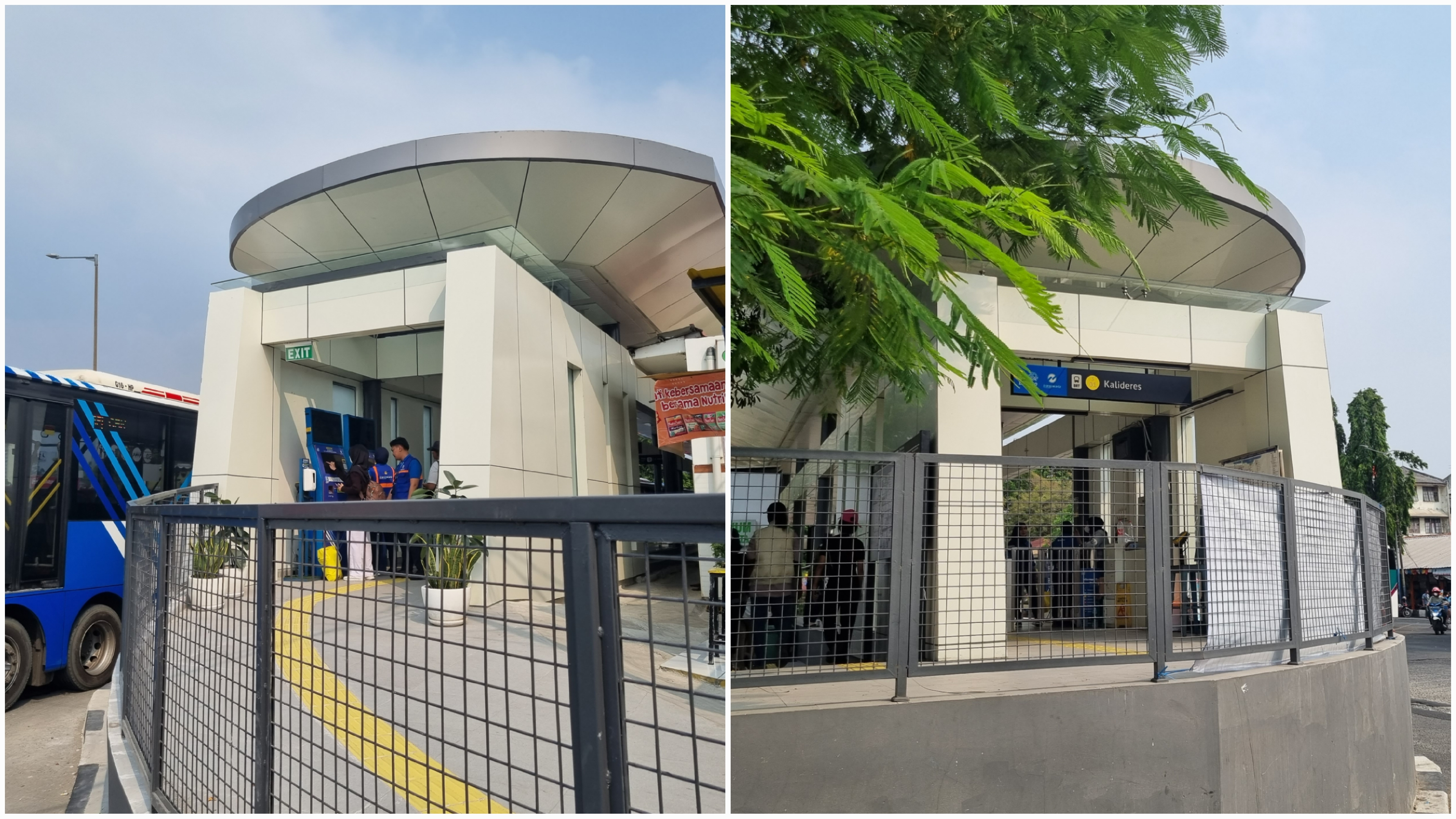
Linkway to transfer from the arrival (right) to the departure (left) platforms

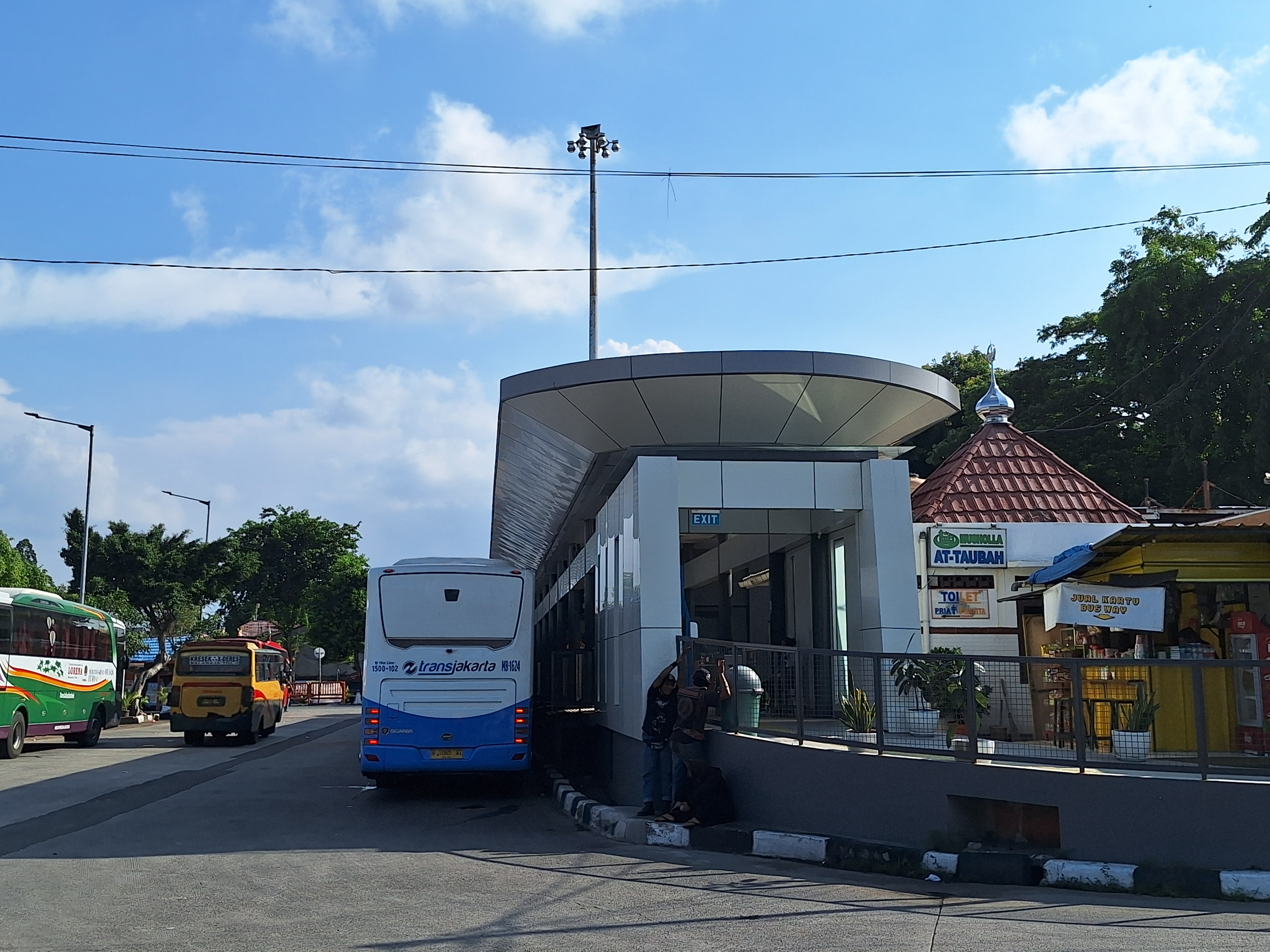
Departure platform, 2024

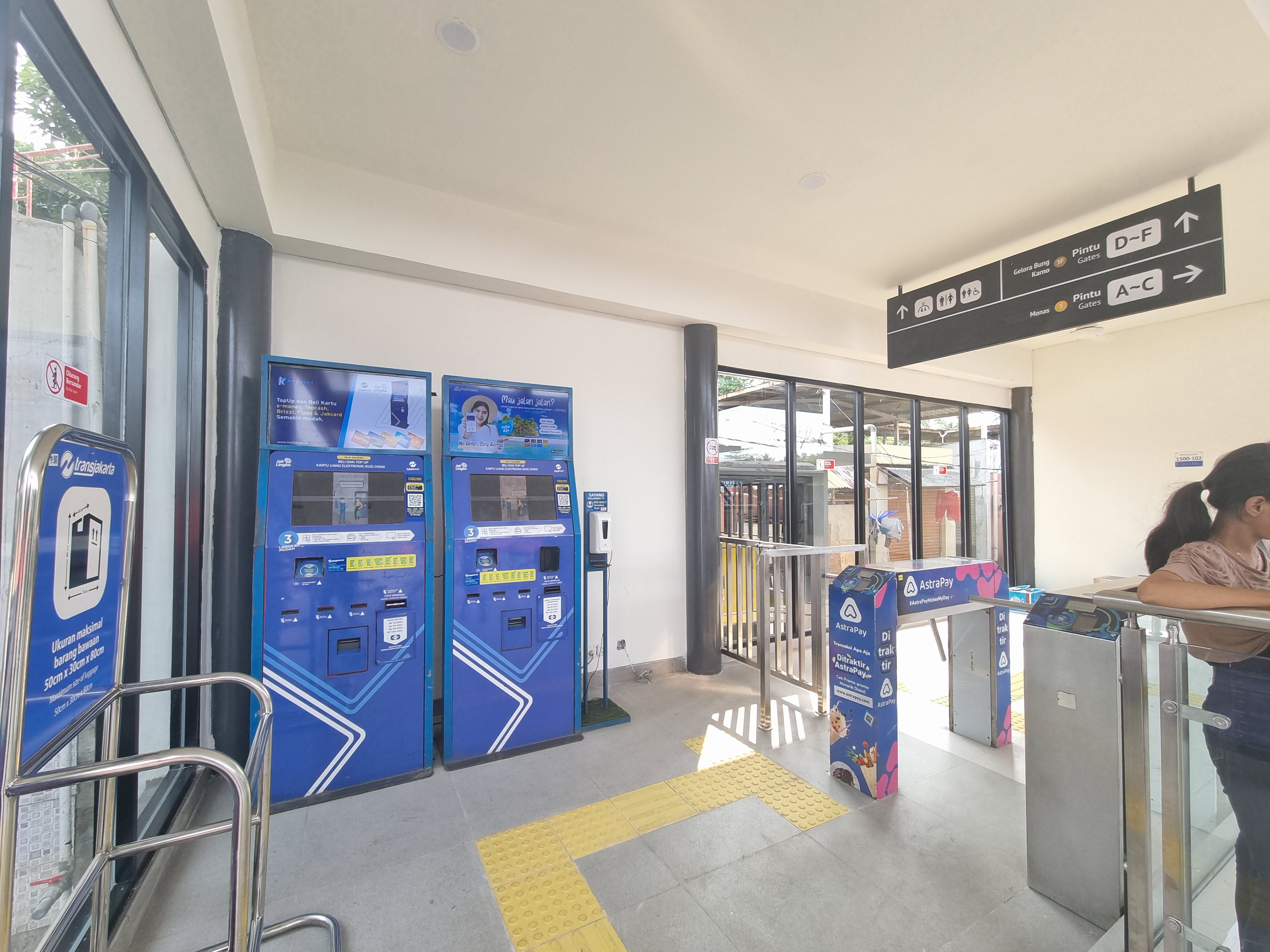
Departure platform concourse with vending machines

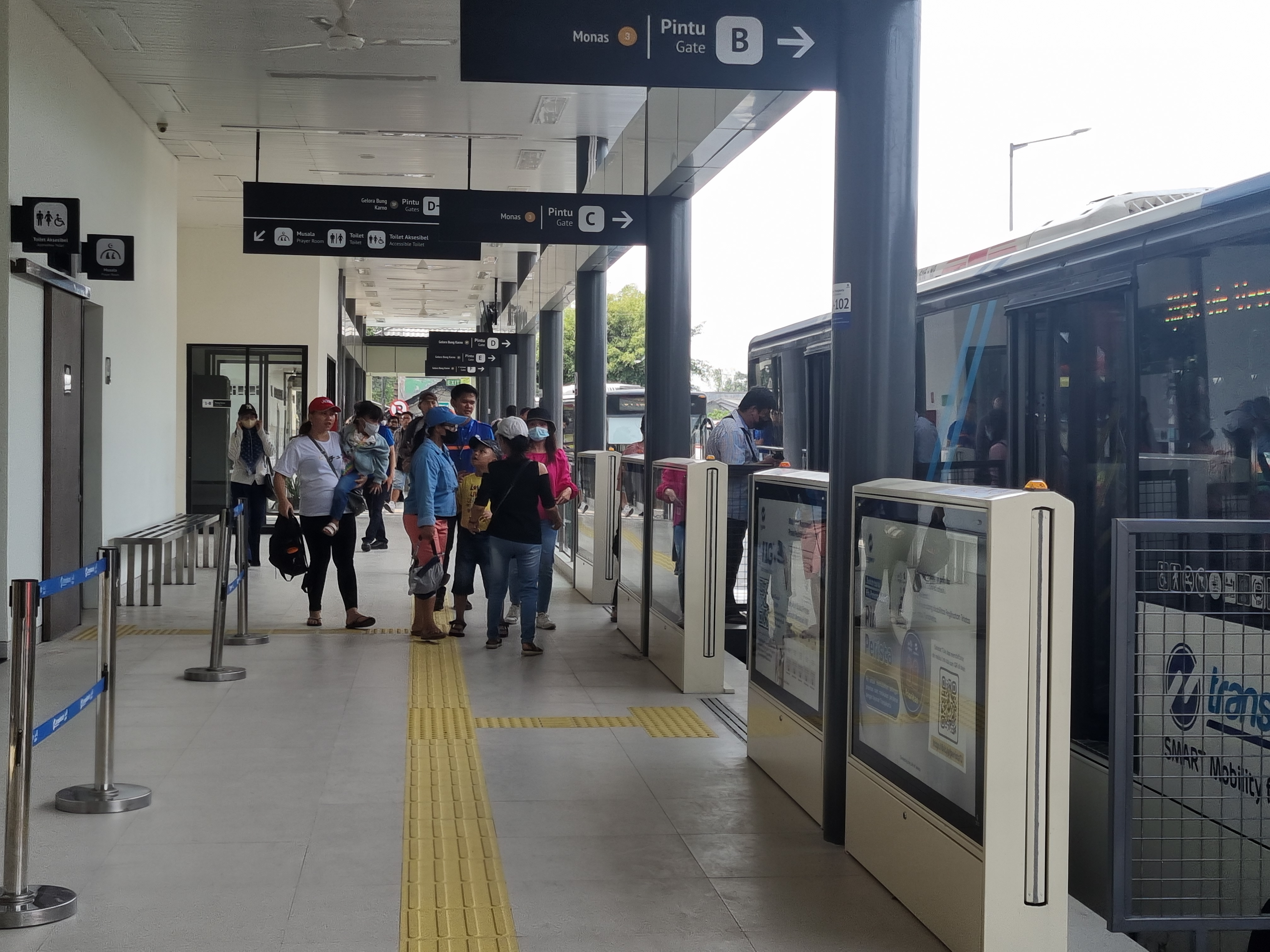
Interior of the departure platform

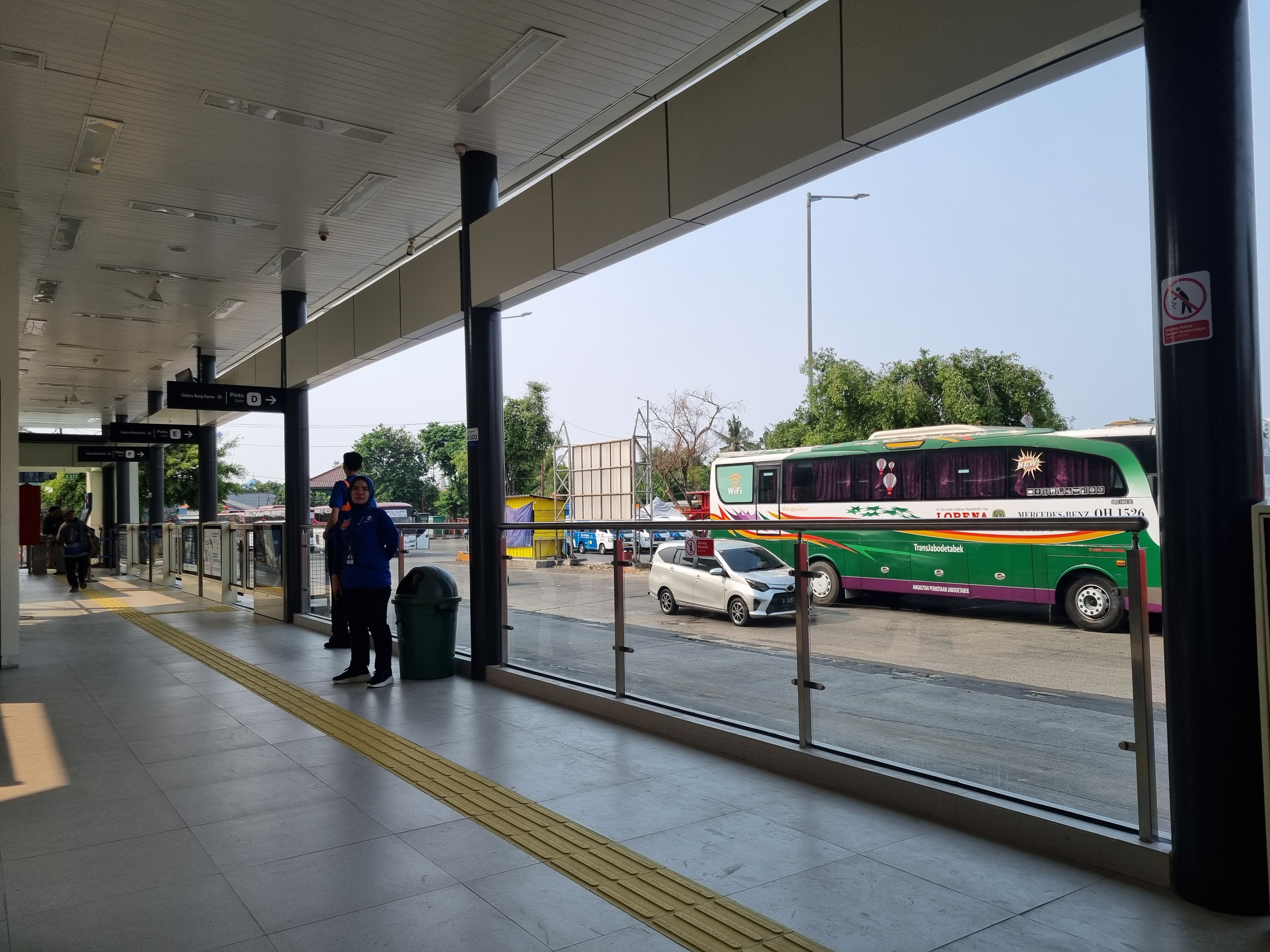
View of the Kalideres Bus Terminal

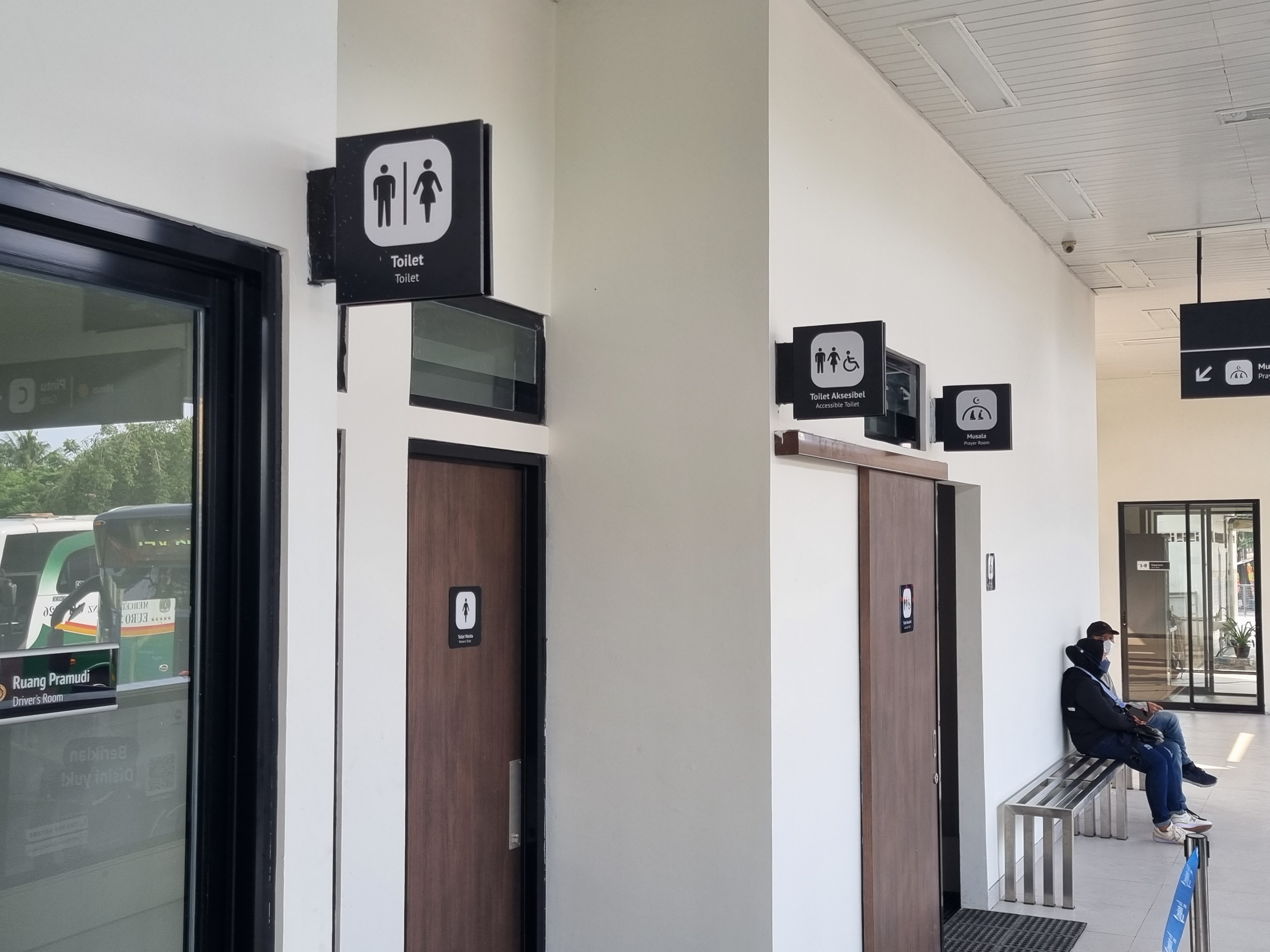
Praying room and disabled-friendly toilets

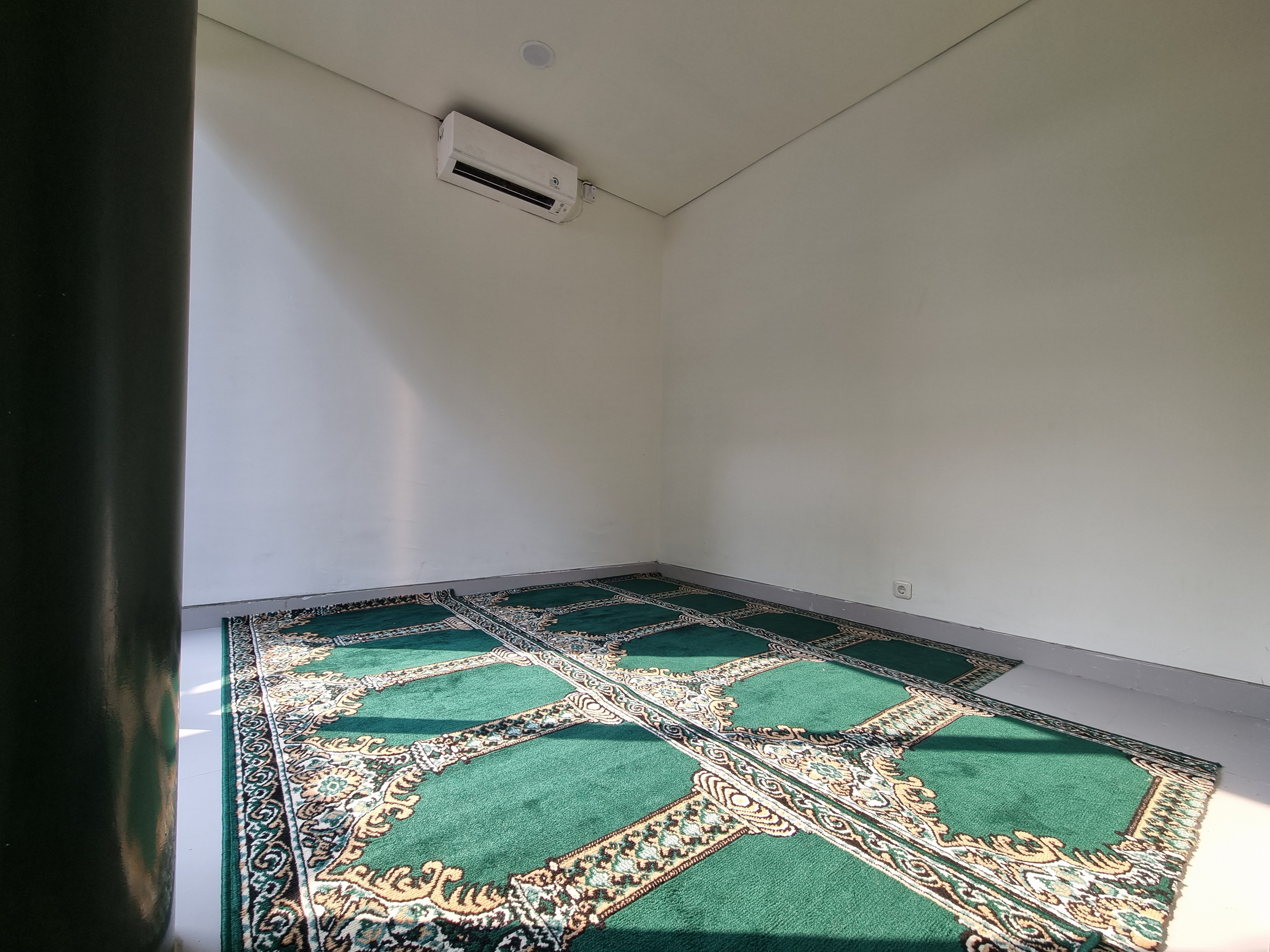
Interior of the praying room (musala)
