= Monumen Nasional (Transjakarta) =

Bus rapid transit station in Jakarta, Indonesia

1 14 2 22 Monumen Nasional
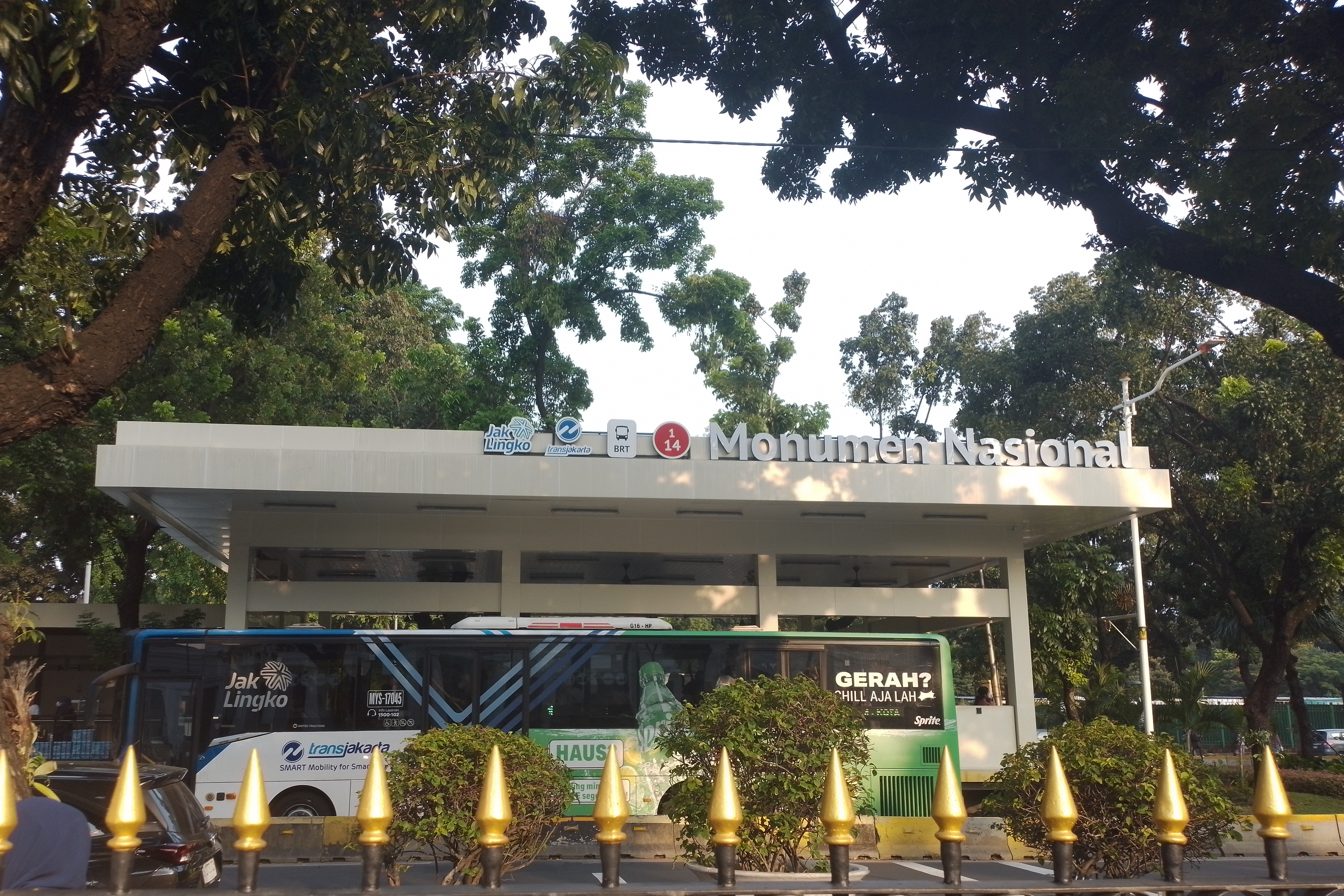
- Exterior of the south wing, 2024

General information
- Other names: Monas
- Location: Medan Merdeka Barat Street, Gambir, Gambir, Central Jakarta 10110, Indonesia
- Coordinates: 6.1760°S 106.8228°E
- System: Transjakarta bus rapid transit station
- Owner: Transjakarta
- Operator: Transjakarta
- Lines: List of Transjakarta corridors#Corridor 1 List of Transjakarta corridors#Corridor 2 List of Transjakarta corridors#Corridor 3 List of Transjakarta corridors#Cross-corridor routes List of TransJakarta corridors#Cross-corridor routes
- Platforms: Three island platforms

Construction
- Structure type: At-grade

Other information
- Status: In service

History
- Opened: 15 January 2004 (soft launching); 1 February 2004 (commercial operation)
- Rebuilt: 23 September 2024

Services
Preceding		Following
Kebon Sirih towards Blok M	Corridor 1	Harmoni towards Kali Besar
Balai Kota towards Pulo Gadung	Corridor 2	Pecenongan One-way operation
Petojo towards Kalideres	Corridor 3	Terminus
Pecenongan towards Juanda	Corridor 5 Route 5C	Balai Kota One-way operation
Balai Kota One-way operation	Corridor 7 Route 7F	Pecenongan towards Juanda
Location

Monumen Nasional (abbreviated Monas) is a Transjakarta bus rapid transit station located on Medan Merdeka Barat Street, Gambir, Gambir, Central Jakarta, Indonesia. The station serves Corridor 1 and is the downtown terminus of Corridor 2 and Corridor 3. It is adjacent the National Monument to the east (hence the name in Indonesian) and the National Museum of Indonesia to the west. However, the station is far from the entrance to that iconic monument, and passengers are instead advised to alight at Balai Kota or Gambir 2 station to access the monument complex's entrance.

Monas BRT station currently serves as one of the central stations in the BRT system temporarily since 4 March 2023. The one of its kind nearby, Harmoni, is operating with low capacity temporary buildings due to the Jakarta MRT construction. Therefore, several routes are currently temporarily rerouted, including corridors 2 and 3, encouraged an expansion to accommodate climbing passenger volume.

== History ==
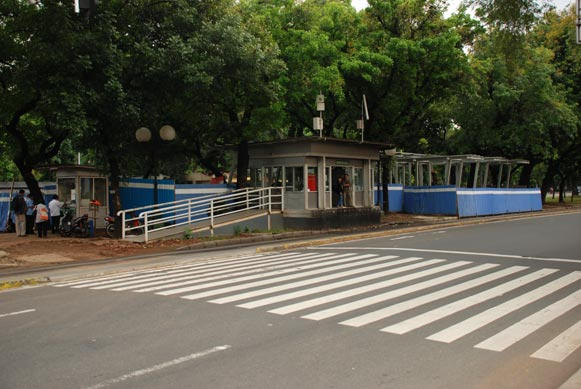
The old Monumen Nasional station under revitalization, 2009

Monas BRT station was opened together with Corridor 1 on 15 January 2004. The original building was tiny and had separate paid areas for each direction, forcing passengers to pay again to change direction. When Corridor 2 first opened in 2006, it also bypassed this station, thus only Corridor 1 stopped here. In 2009, the station was revitalized with a larger building and has three platform bays on each side. In 2017, a paid smart toilet was built at Monas BRT station.

On 4 March 2023, Harmoni BRT station, the busiest central station in the system, was closed and temporarily moved into two small separated temporary buildings, to make way for the ongoing Jakarta MRT phase 2A construction works. Corridor 2, which originally terminates there, have been temporarily moved to Monas. Concerns on potential overcrowding in Monas had encouraged Transjakarta to readjust several routes: route 5C now makes a loop instead towards Juanda and Lapangan Banteng stations. Routes 6A and 6B were rerouted to turn right after Kebon Sirih station, terminating at Balai Kota station instead. Also, Corridor 3 was rerouted from its original terminus, Pasar Baru, to Bundaran HI, as Pasar Baru is used for the terminus of Corridor 8, originally terminates in Harmoni. The rerouted Corridor 3 initially bypassed this station and went straight to Kebon Sirih to terminate at Bundaran HI. However, starting from 29 May 2023, Corridor 3 terminates at this station and no longer runs towards Bundaran HI.

Afterwards, Transjakarta decided to make Monas BRT station as the temporary main interchange or central station upon Harmoni's closure. It was originally criticised due to its undersized structure, having not enough bus bays to handle high-passenger volume and multiple routes together, causing long queues of passengers waiting for various routes. In response, Transjakarta began extending the southern and northern ends of the station with new platforms to increase the station's capacity. On 29 September 2024, the new north and south wings were opened. The smart toilet, however, have been removed during the expansion and replaced by standard accessible toilets, but they are now free of charge.

== Building and layout ==
Monas BRT station now has nine bus bays on each side, which consists of the existing central building and two new large wings to the north and south. Facilities such as disabled-friendly toilets and a prayer room (musala) between the central and south buildings were renovated, with lactation rooms being newly-added. The pelican crossing access was also slightly relocated to the north wing.

Below is the layout of the Monumen Nasional BRT station platform based on the routes served, last updated on 18 June 2025:

← (Petojo)	↑ (Harmoni) → (Pecenongan)	North
towards Kota	Arrivals
towards Juanda	towards Pulo Gadung
Island platform,
West	the platform doors are opened on the right side of the direction of travel	East
towards Kalideres	towards Blok M
South	↓ (Kebon Sirih)	→ (Balai Kota)

== Non-BRT bus services ==
The following non-BRT bus services stop around the Monumen Nasional station, last updated on 28 October 2024:

Type	Route	Destination	Notes
Inner city feeder		Pantai Maju—Balai Kota	Inside the station
Inner city feeder		Blok M—Senen	Outside the station
Inner city feeder		Monumen Nasional—Jakarta International Stadium	Inside the station
#jakartaexplorer double-decker tour buses		Monas Explorer	Outside the station
#jakartaexplorer double-decker tour buses		Jakarta Skyscrapers (Pencakar Langit Jakarta)	Outside the station
Mikrotrans Jak Lingko	JAK-10	Kota—Tanah Abang	Outside the station

== Nearby places ==
- National Monument
- National Museum of Indonesia
- Ministry of Communication and Digital Affairs
- Ministry of Defense

== Gallery ==
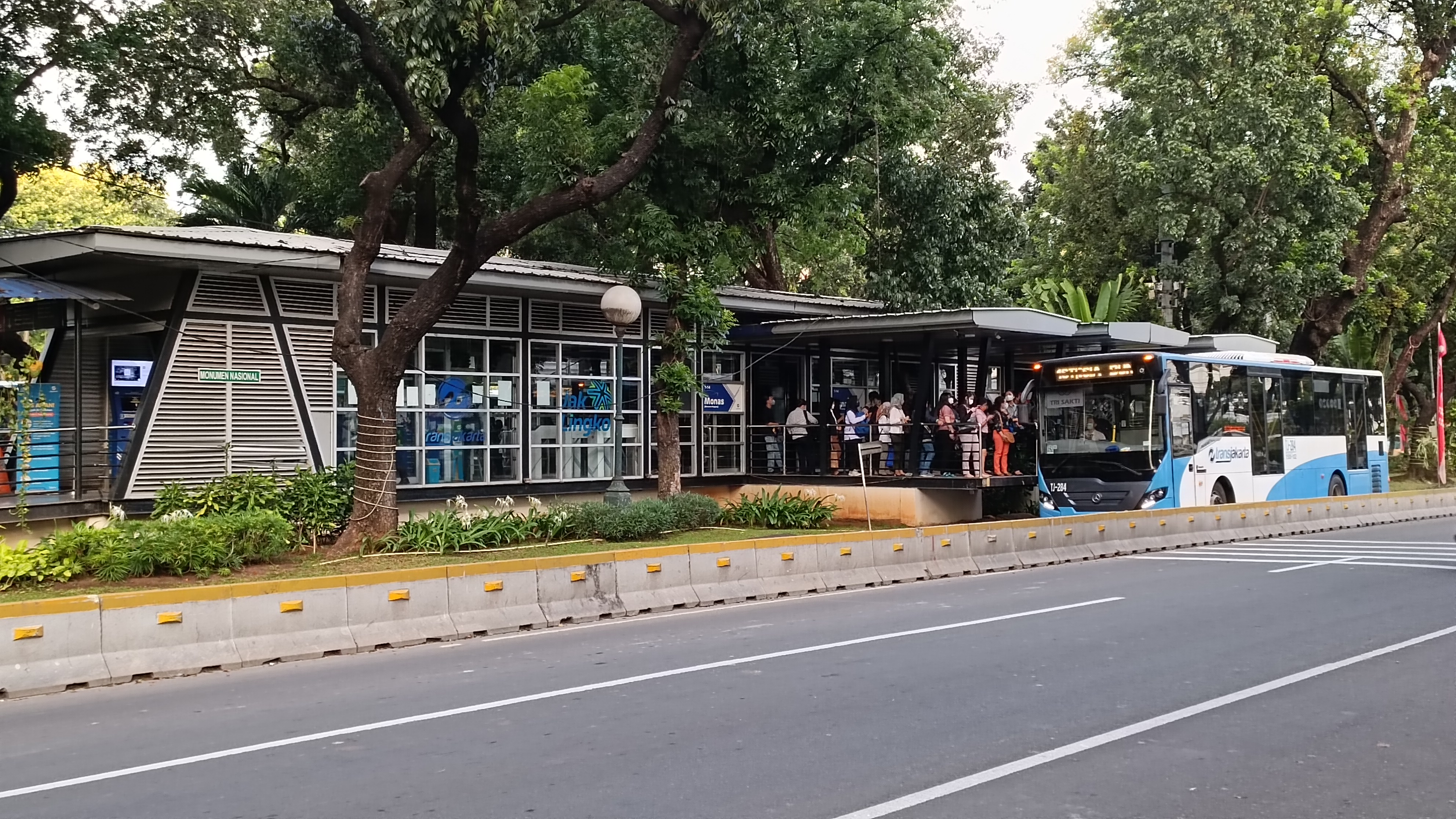
The station after the first revitalisation seen in 2022, prior to the construction of the north and south wings

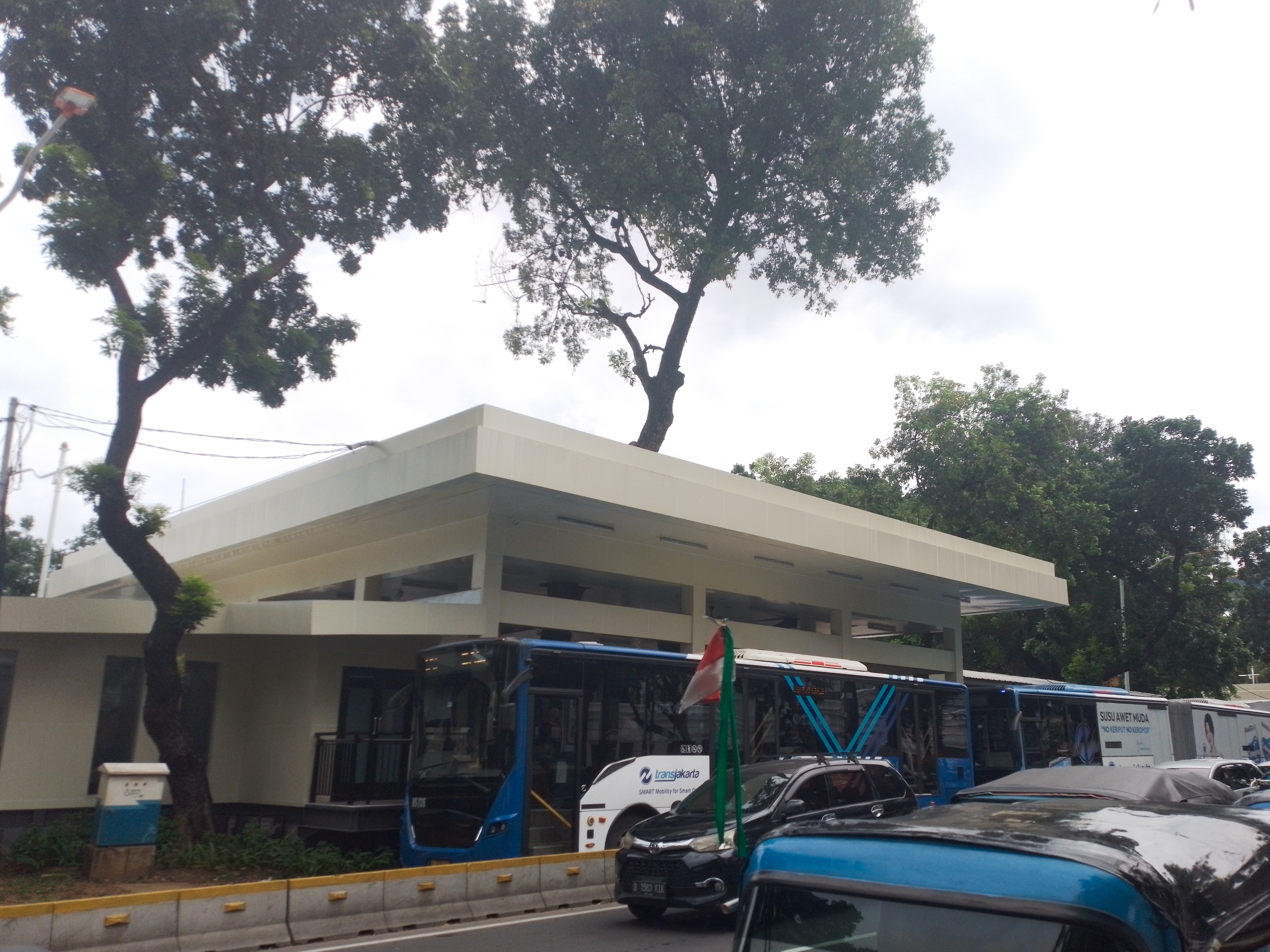
Exterior of the north wing, 2024

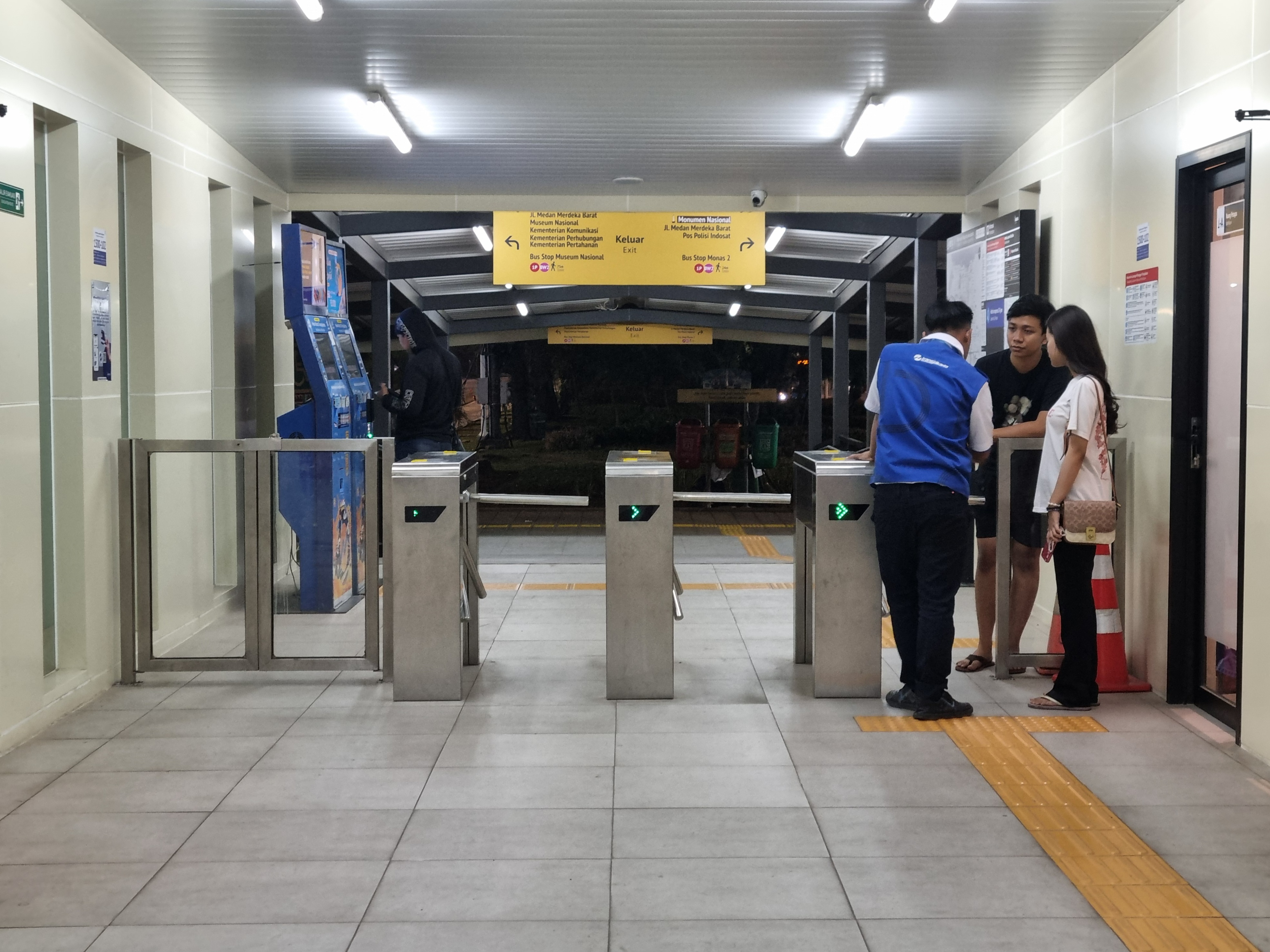
The new station entrance at the north wing, 2024

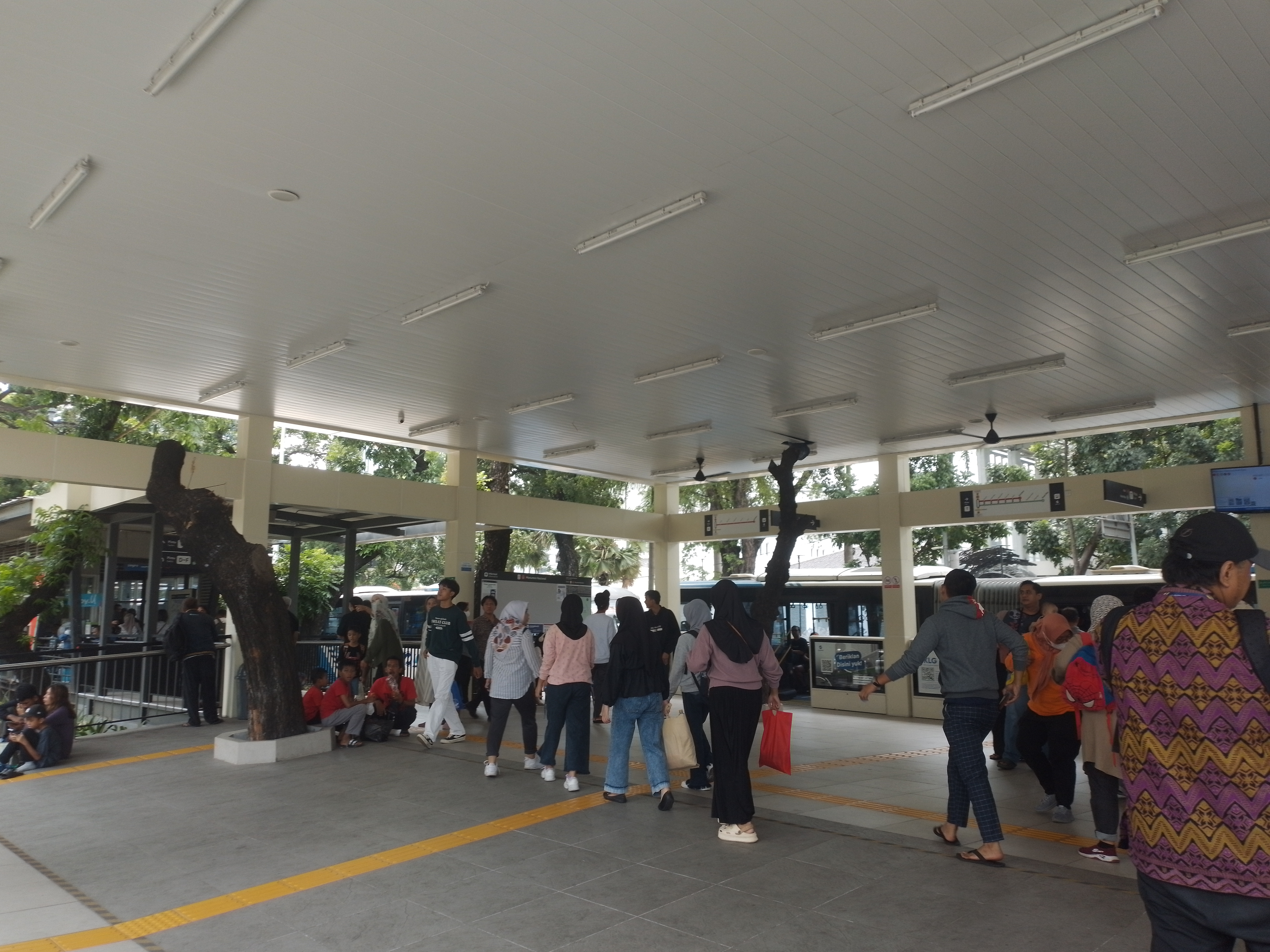
Interior of the new north wing, 2024

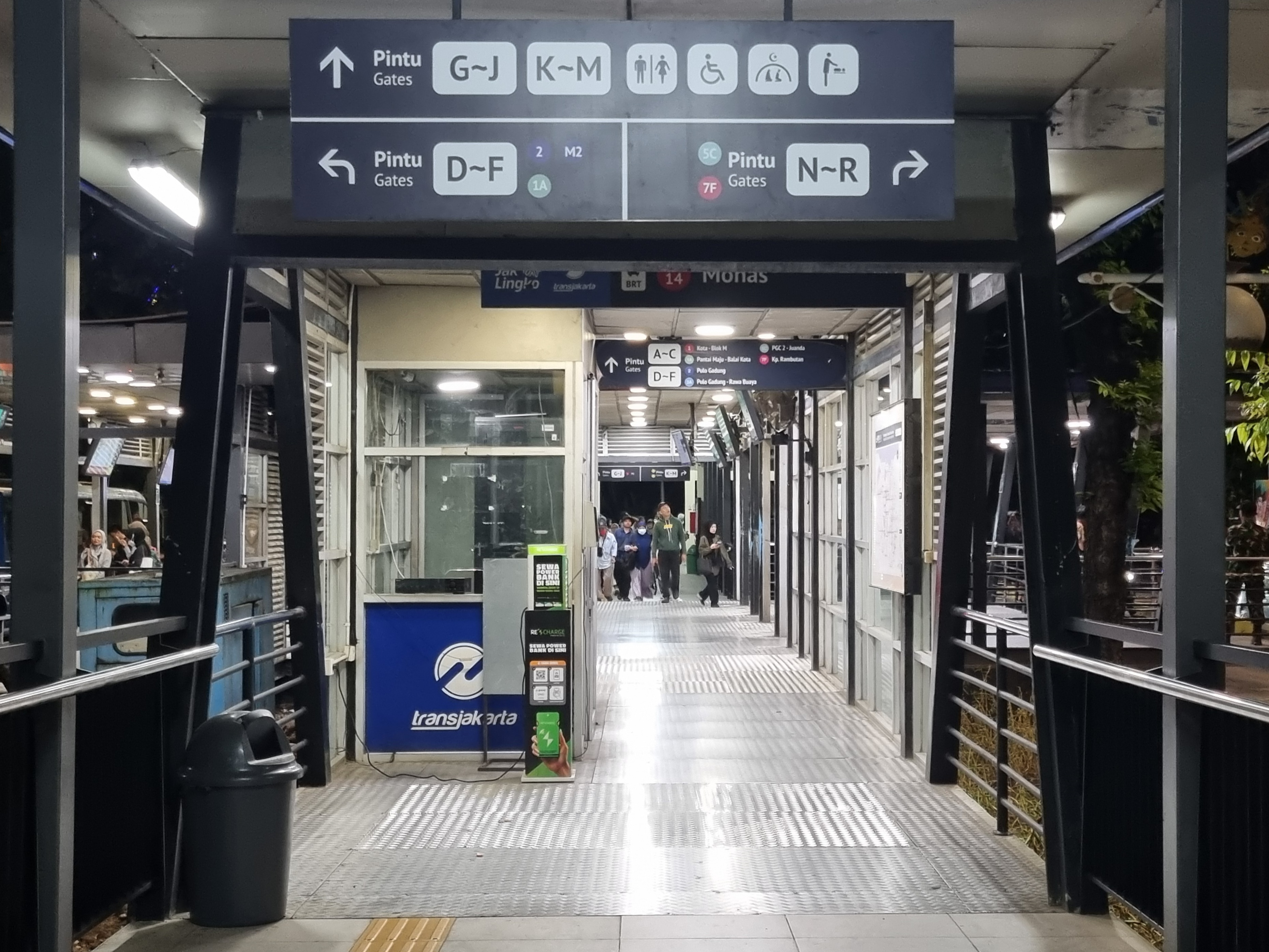
The old station entrance that became the connecting ramp between central and northern buildings, 2024

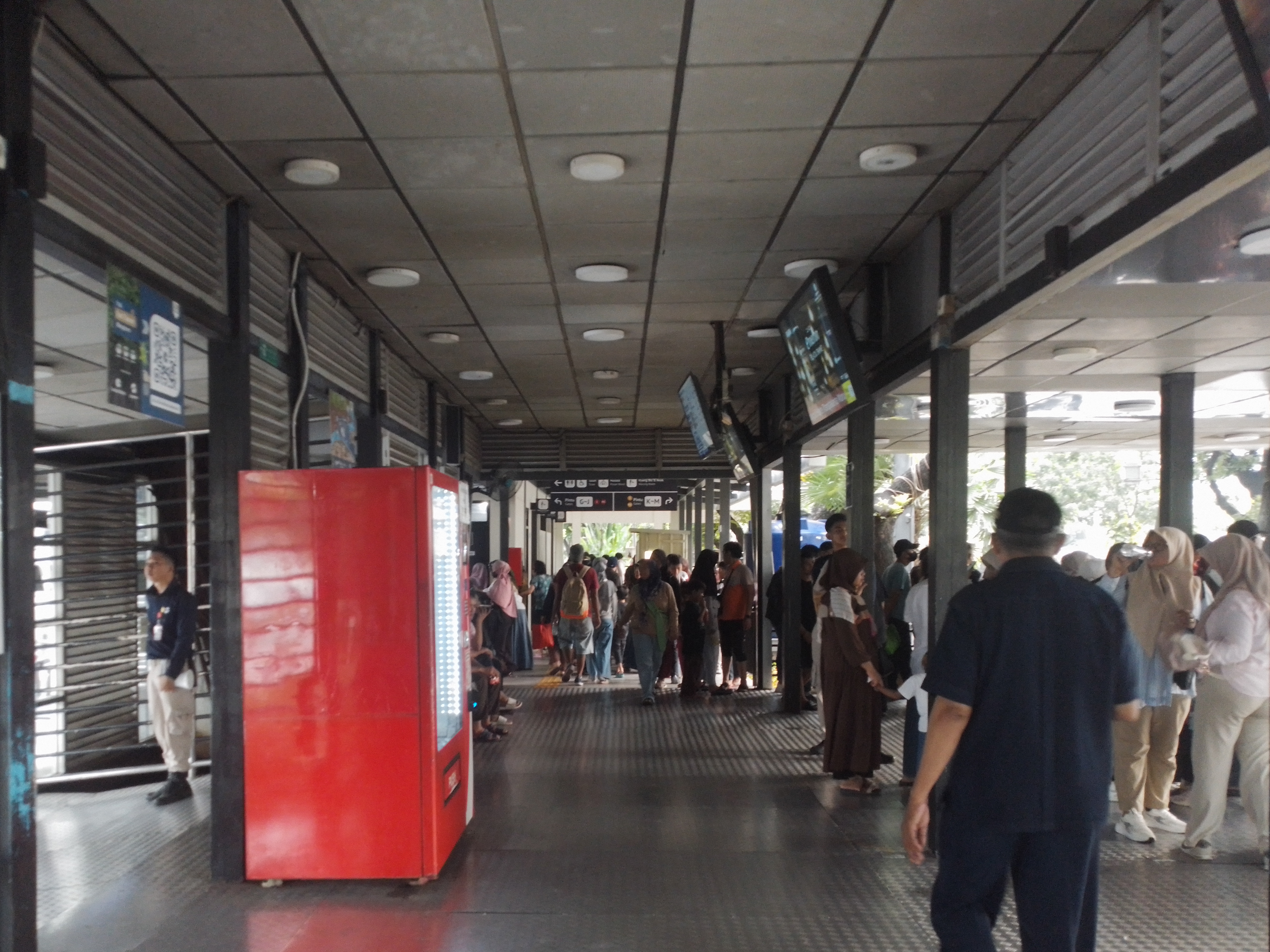
Inner view of the central building, 2024

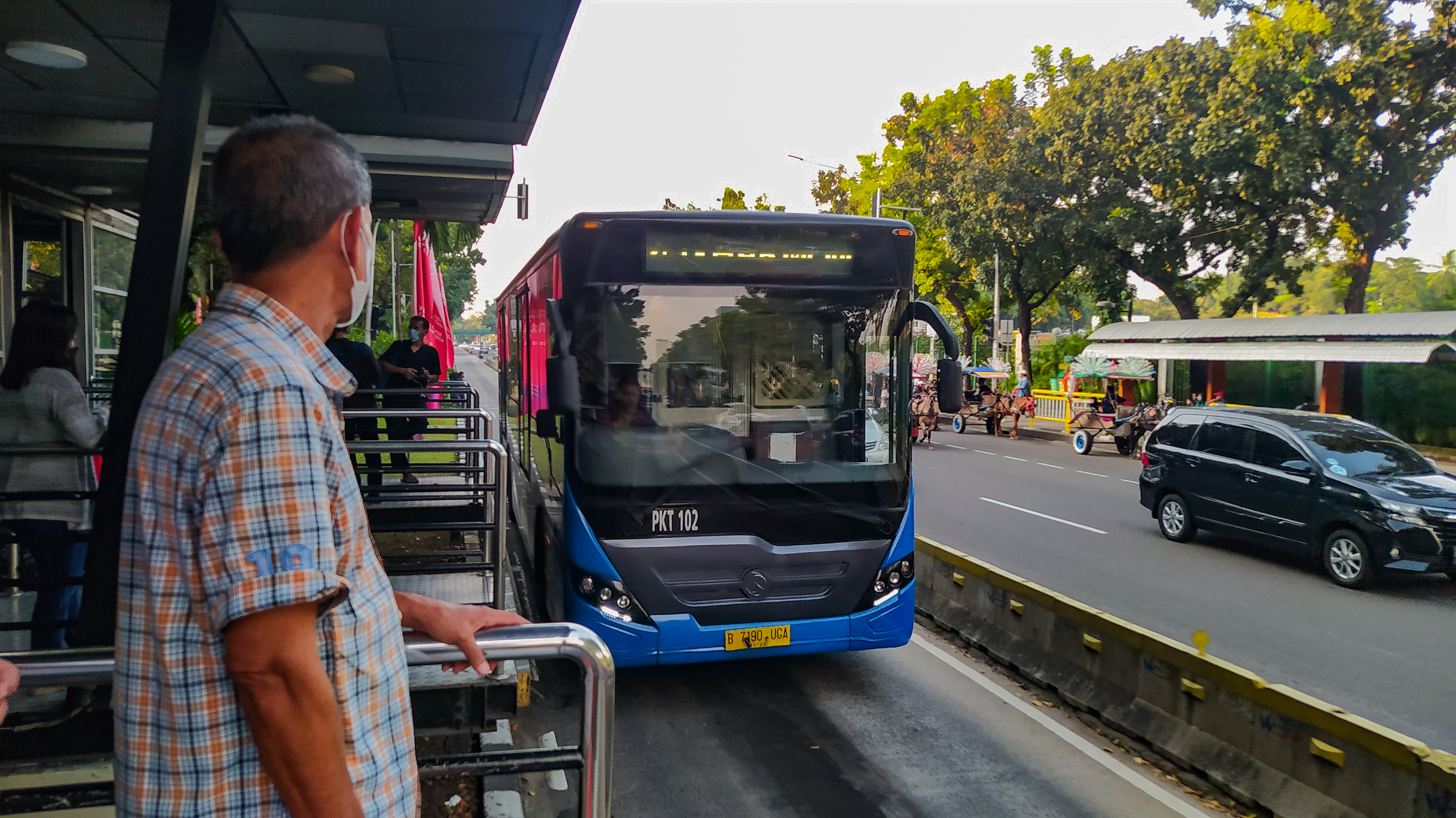
Corridor 2 bus towards Pulo Gadung entering Monas, 2022

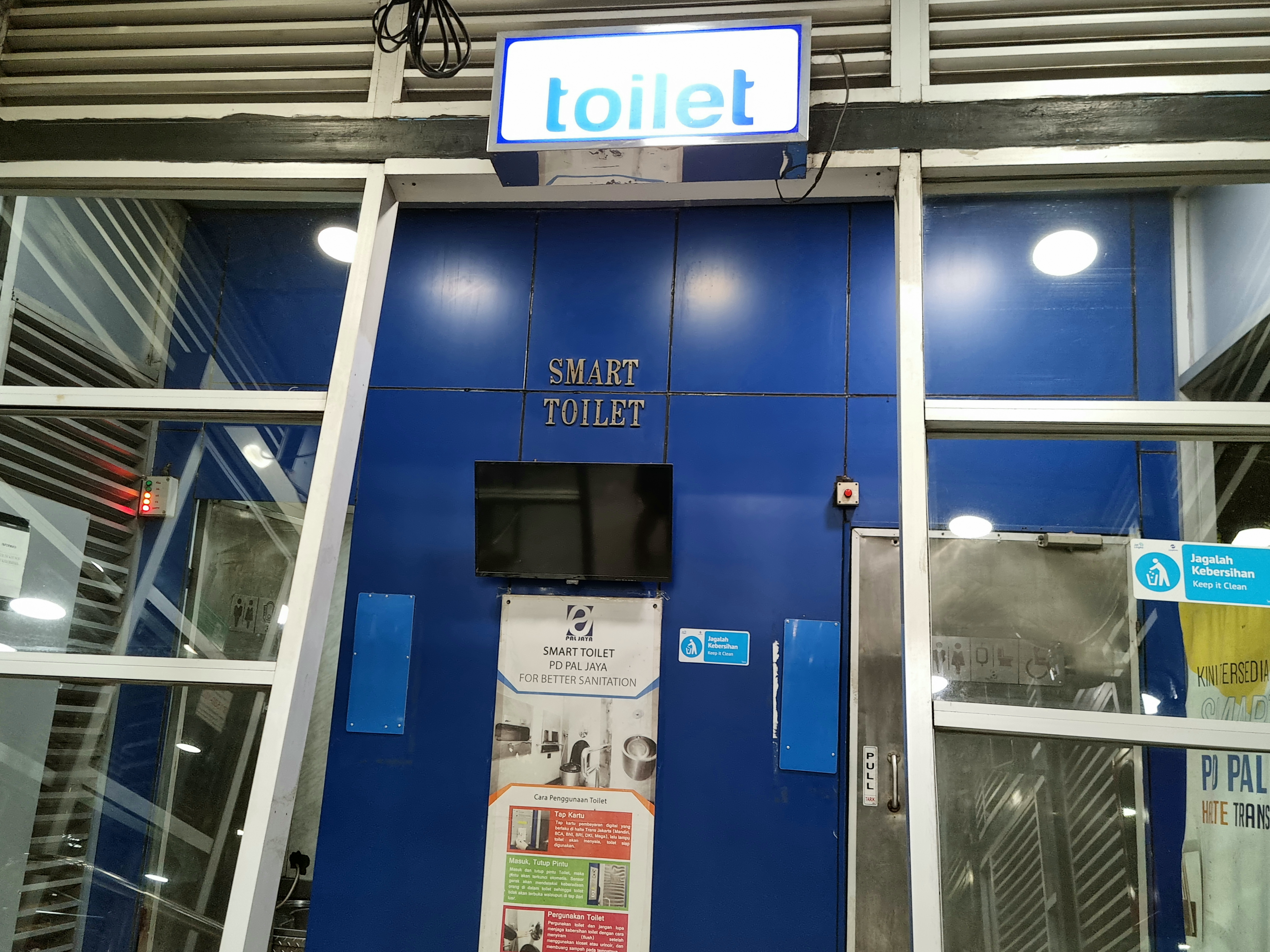
Smart toilets in the central building seen in 2022. It was replaced with standard toilets after the 2024 expansion

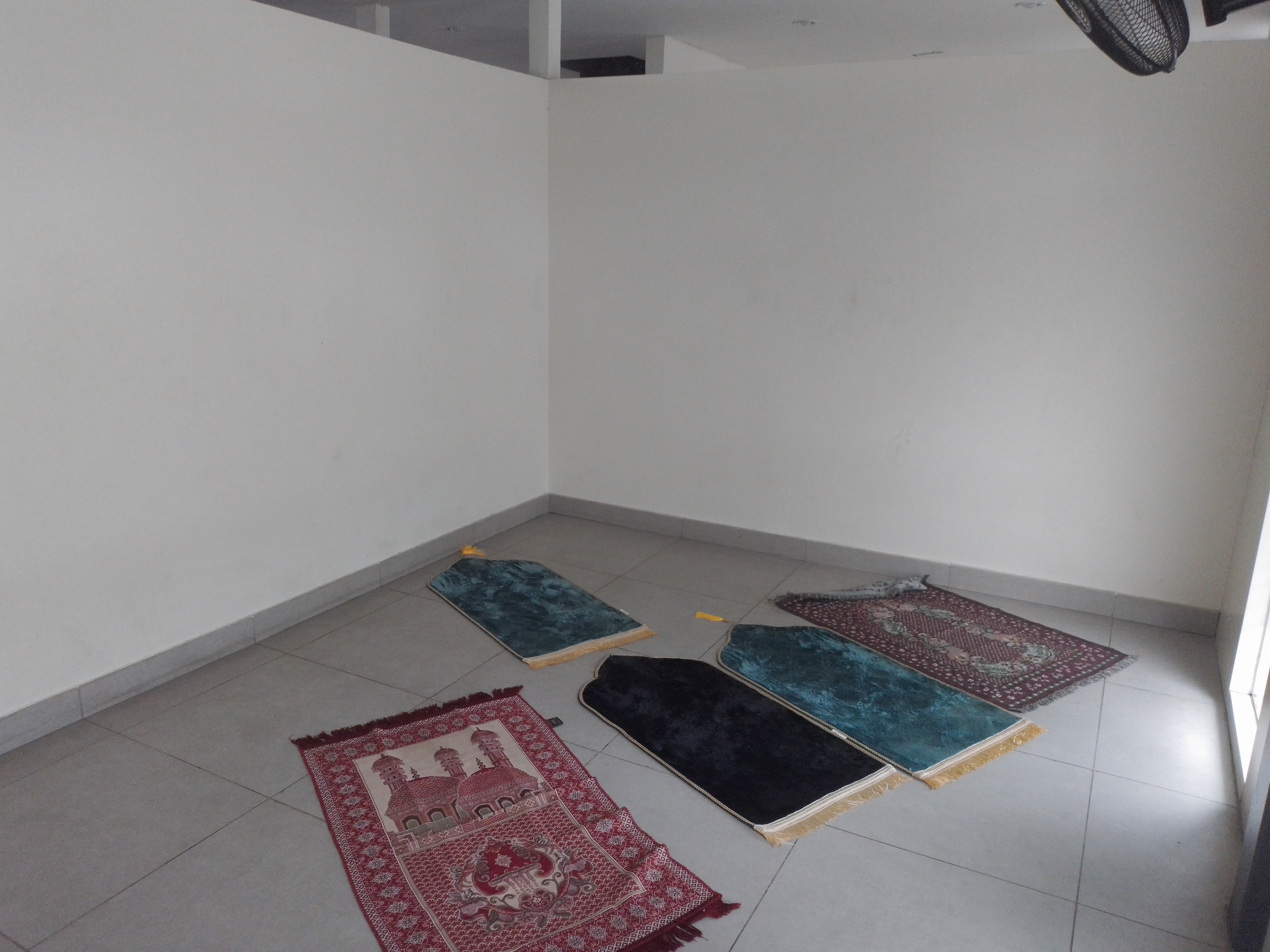
The renovated praying room (musala) between the central and south buildings seen in 2024

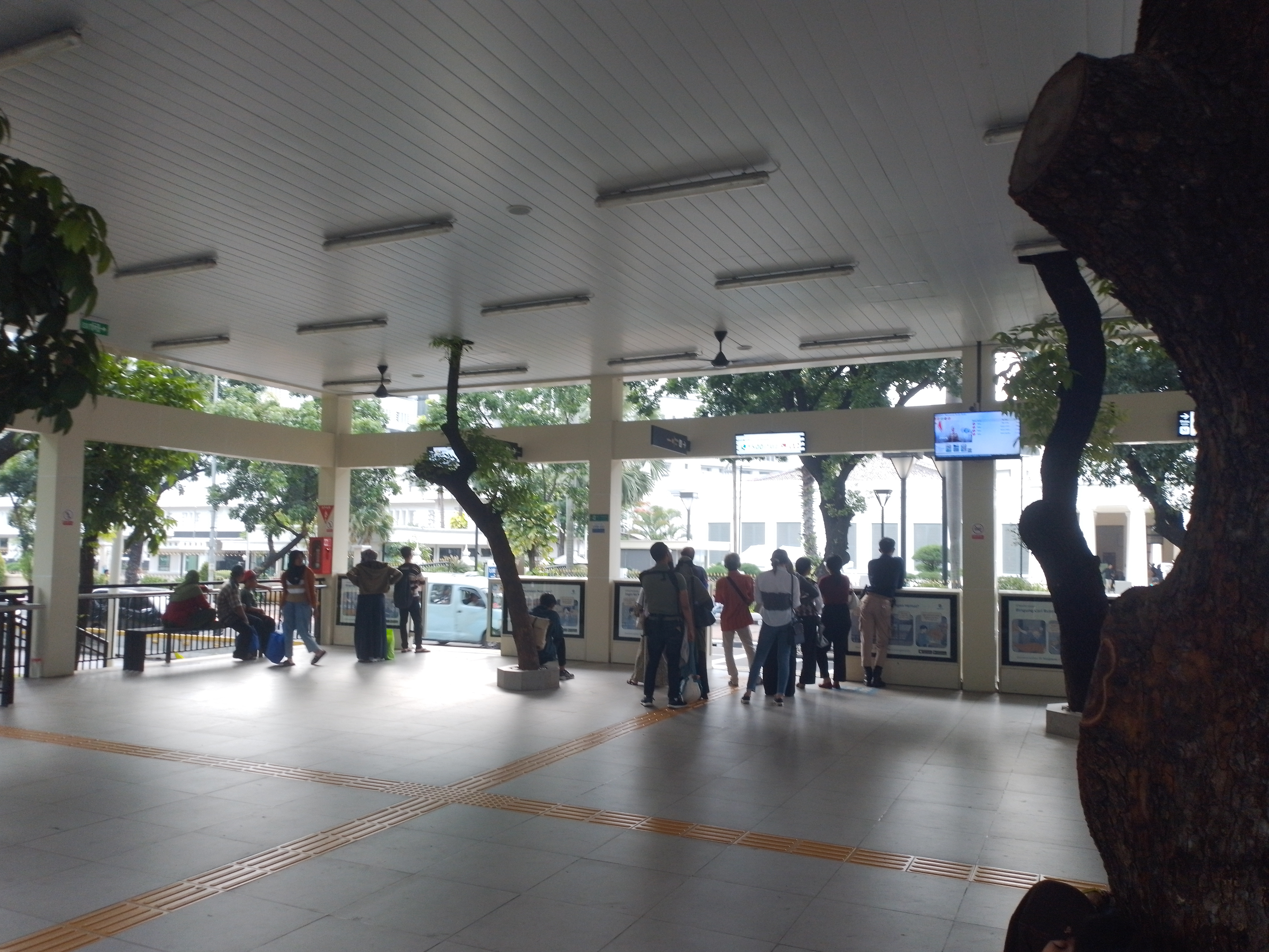
Interior of the south wing, 2024
