= Jaga Jakarta (Transjakarta) =

Bus rapid transit station in Jakarta, Indonesia

5 07 Jaga Jakarta
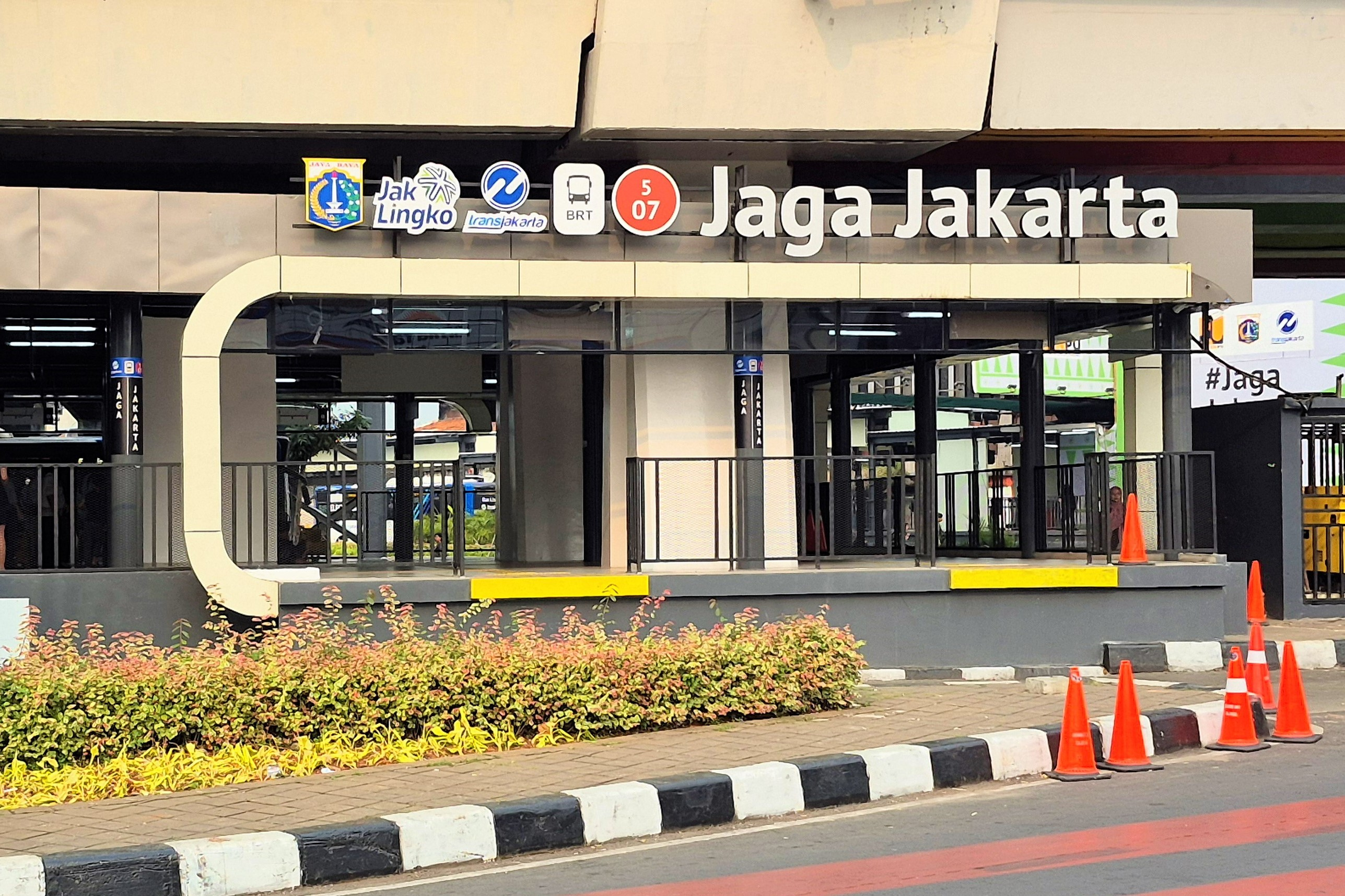
- Exterior of the station, 2025

General information
- Location: Gunung Sahari Street, Senen, Senen, Central Jakarta 10410, Jakarta, Indonesia
- System: Transjakarta bus rapid transit station
- Owner: Transjakarta
- Operator: Transjakarta
- Lines: List of Transjakarta corridors#Corridor 5
- Platforms: Single island platform
- Connections: Senen Toyota Rangga; Pasar Senen

Construction
- Structure type: At-grade
- Cycle facilities: Available
- Accessible: Yes

Other information
- Status: In service

History
- Opened: 27 January 2007
- Rebuilt: 31 May 2023; 3 years ago
- Former names: Senen Sentral

Services
Preceding		Following
Lapangan Banteng towards Ancol	Corridor 5	Pal Putih towards Kampung Melayu
Galur One-way operation	Corridor 2 transfer at Senen Toyota Rangga	Senen Raya towards Monumen Nasional
Galur towards Pulo Gadung	Corridor 2 transfer at Senen Toyota Rangga	Kwitang One-way operation
Galur towards Pulo Gadung	Corridor 2 Route 2A transfer at Senen Toyota Rangga	Kwitang towards Rawa Buaya
Galur towards Kampung Rambutan	Corridor 7 Route 7F transfer at Senen Toyota Rangga	Kwitang towards Juanda
Senen Raya Terminus	Corridor 14 transfer at Senen Toyota Rangga	Tanah Tinggi towards Jakarta International Stadium
Location

Jaga Jakarta (lit. 'Take care of Jakarta', formerly Senen Sentral) is a Transjakarta bus rapid transit station located below the Gunung Sahari overpass at the Senen intersection in Jakarta, Indonesia. The station serves Corridor 5, stretching from north to south, and is connected by a transfer linkway to Senen Toyota Rangga station that serves Corridors 2 and 14. It is located adjacent with the Senen market on the east.

== History ==
The BRT station first commenced operation as Senen Sentral (sometimes called Central Senen) with the entire Corridor 5 service on 27 January 2007. It originally consisted of three platform bays with extending linkways. An expansion to the north was carried out, but later the new area was closed due to narrow access.

On 4 September 2022, Senen Sentral BRT station was closed together with Gatot Subroto LIPI (now Widya Chandra Telkomsel), SMK 57 (Jati Barat), and Kuningan Barat (Simpang Kuningan) for revitalization and Transjakarta began to operate the 3ST (Atrium–Budi Utomo) temporary shuttle route to accommodate affected passengers. The process took eight months and the station was reopened to the public on 31 May 2023.

On 8 September 2025, Senen Sentral BRT station was officially renamed to Jaga Jakarta after a week of reparations after it was damaged by arson during a nationwide protests on 29 August 2025. The new name was chosen to raise awareness to protect public facilities from any kind of vandalism, arsons and anarchist destruction that often occurred during civil protests. Debris from the arson and remnants of the schorched amenities, such as turnstiles and a television set for passenger information system, are stored inside a glass box within the station building, touted as a memorabilia and a symbol of awareness.

== Building and layout ==
The west side of Jaga Jakarta BRT station has 5 platform bays, while there are 3 bays only on the east side, most likely to place the integration access to Senen Toyota Rangga BRT station. The platform bays resemble squircles, similar to those in Simpang Kuningan and Kampung Melayu. The station now includes an accessible toilet and a prayer room (musala).

West	to Ancol (Lapangan Banteng) →
Island platform, the platform doors are opened on the right side of the direction of travel
East	← (Pal Putih/Senen Toyota Rangga) to Kampung Melayu

== Non-BRT bus services ==
Type	Route	Destination	Notes
Jakarta Fair feeder		Kampung Melayu–JiExpo Kemayoran	Inside the station Only operates during the Jakarta Fair and/or other events on JiExpo Kemayoran.
Inner city feeder		Senen–Blok M	Outside the station
Inner city feeder		Senen–Tanah Abang Station	Outside the station
Inner city feeder		Gondangdia Station–Senen	Outside the station
Inner city feeder		Lebak Bulus–Senen	Inside the station
Inner city feeder		Cibubur → Ancol	Inside the station
Inner city feeder		Tanjung Priok–Senen via JIS	Outside the station
Mikrotrans Jak Lingko	JAK-17	Pulo Gadung–Senen	Outside the station
Mikrotrans Jak Lingko	JAK-23	Pisangan Baru–Senen	Outside the station

== Places nearby ==
- Senen market
- Atrium Senen mall
- Senen bus terminal
- Kwitang book market
- The Jakarta regional office of the Directorate General of State Wealth (DJKN)
- The Indonesian Education and Profession Development Institution (LP3I)

== Incidents ==
As with the neighbouring Senen station, Senen Sentral BRT station was targeted in an arson during the omnibus law protest on 8 October 2020. There were no casualties, but burn damage was sustained on the south side of the station building.

Another set of protests erupted on 29 August 2025, and Senen Sentral was among the bus stations burned, damaged and looted by rioters, along with the aforementioned Senen BRT station. The transfer bridge between both stations also sustained the damage. It went out of service for a week of reparations that involved local residents, students, and online motorcycle taxi (ojek daring) drivers. On 8 September 2025, Senen Sentral BRT station was officially reopened as Jaga Jakarta, but since then, half-height glass walls and platform screen doors were replaced with simple black trellis. Also, the bridge was still closed for a nine-month reparations by the Ministry of Public Works, with Transjakarta provided temporary shuttle route 21ST between the two station during the process. On 4 June 2026, reparations of the transfer and access bridge was completed and the 21ST shuttle route was decommissioned.

== Gallery ==
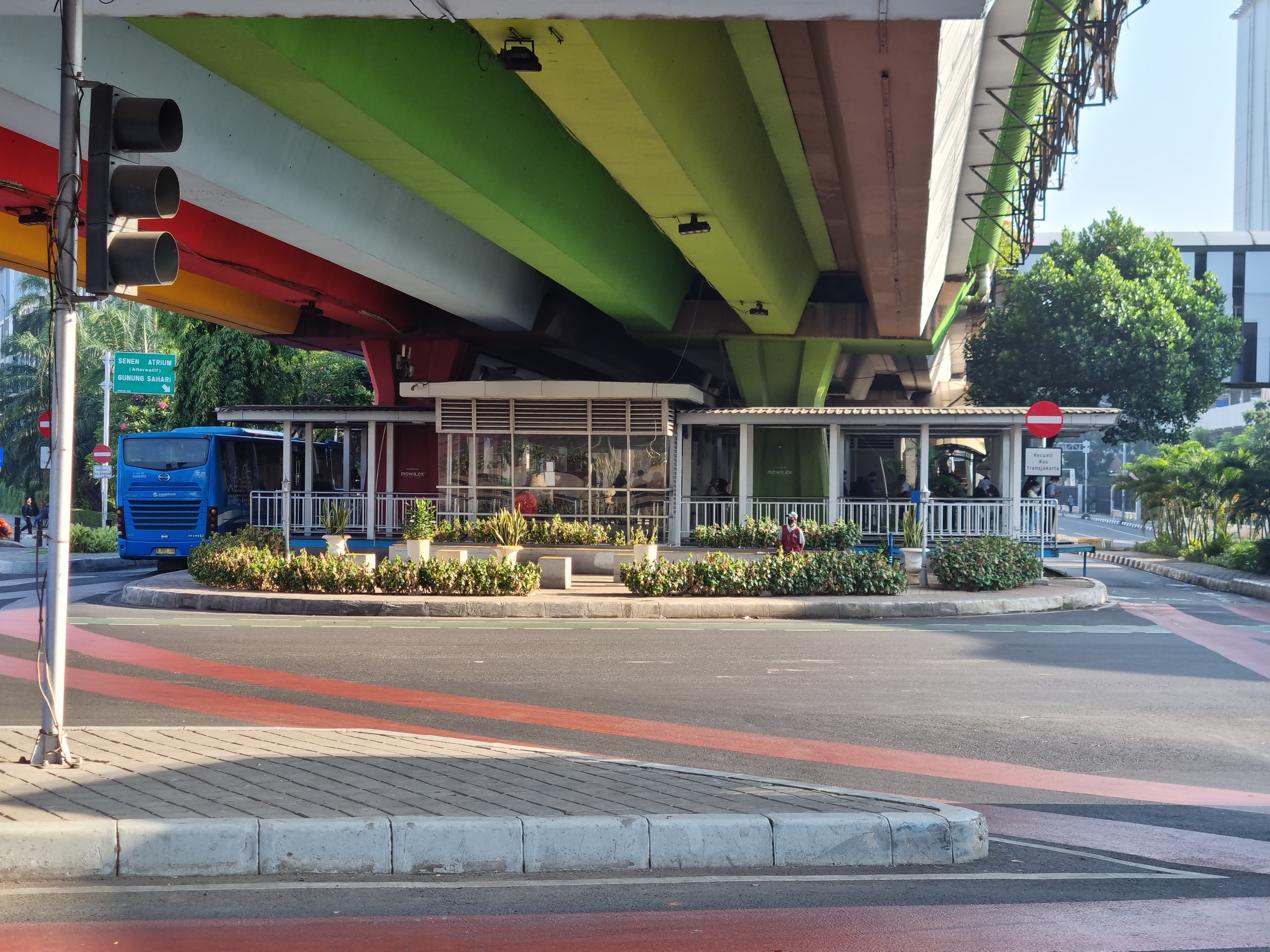
Senen Sentral station prior to revitalization, 2022

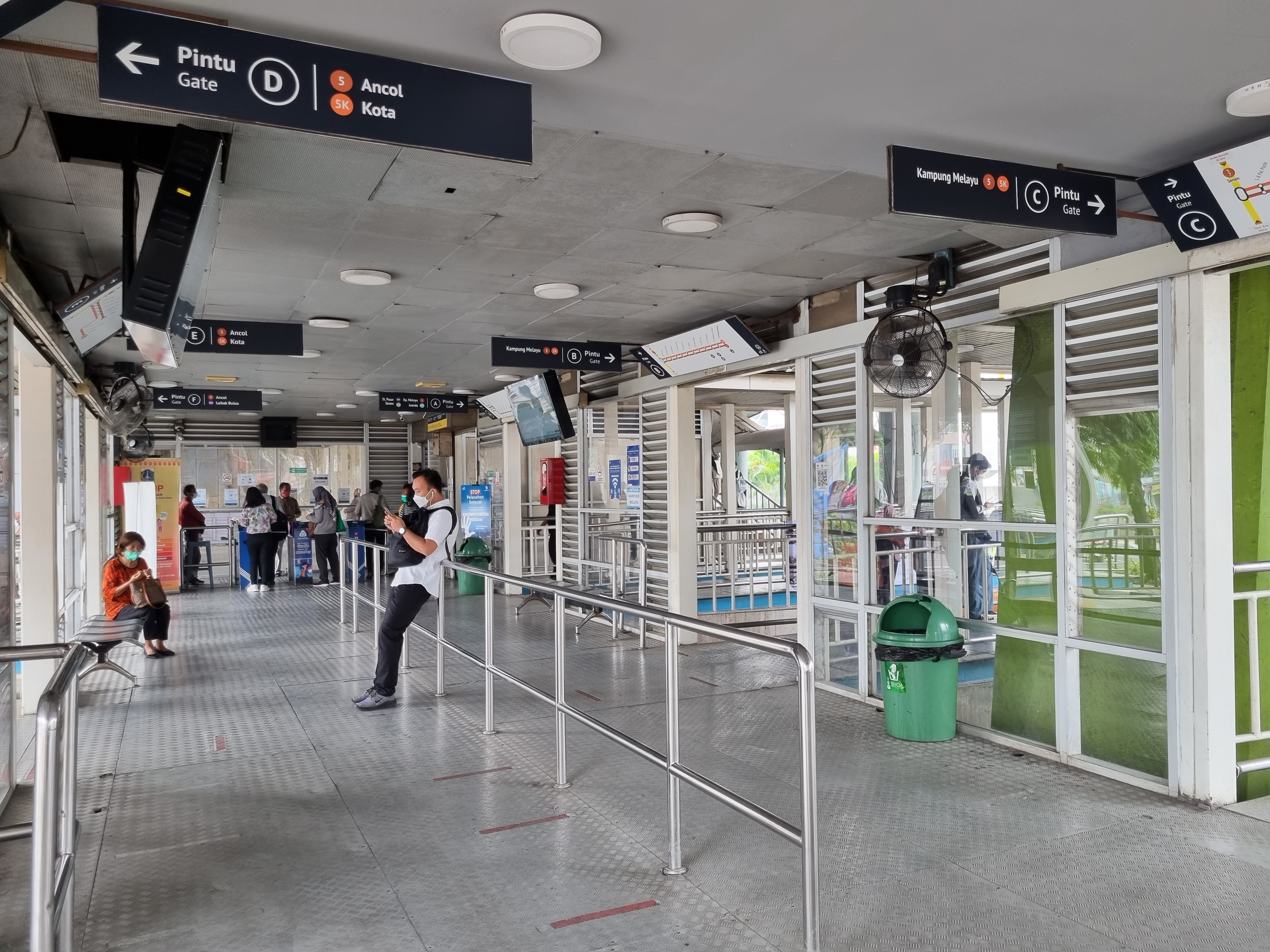
The interior prior to revitalization

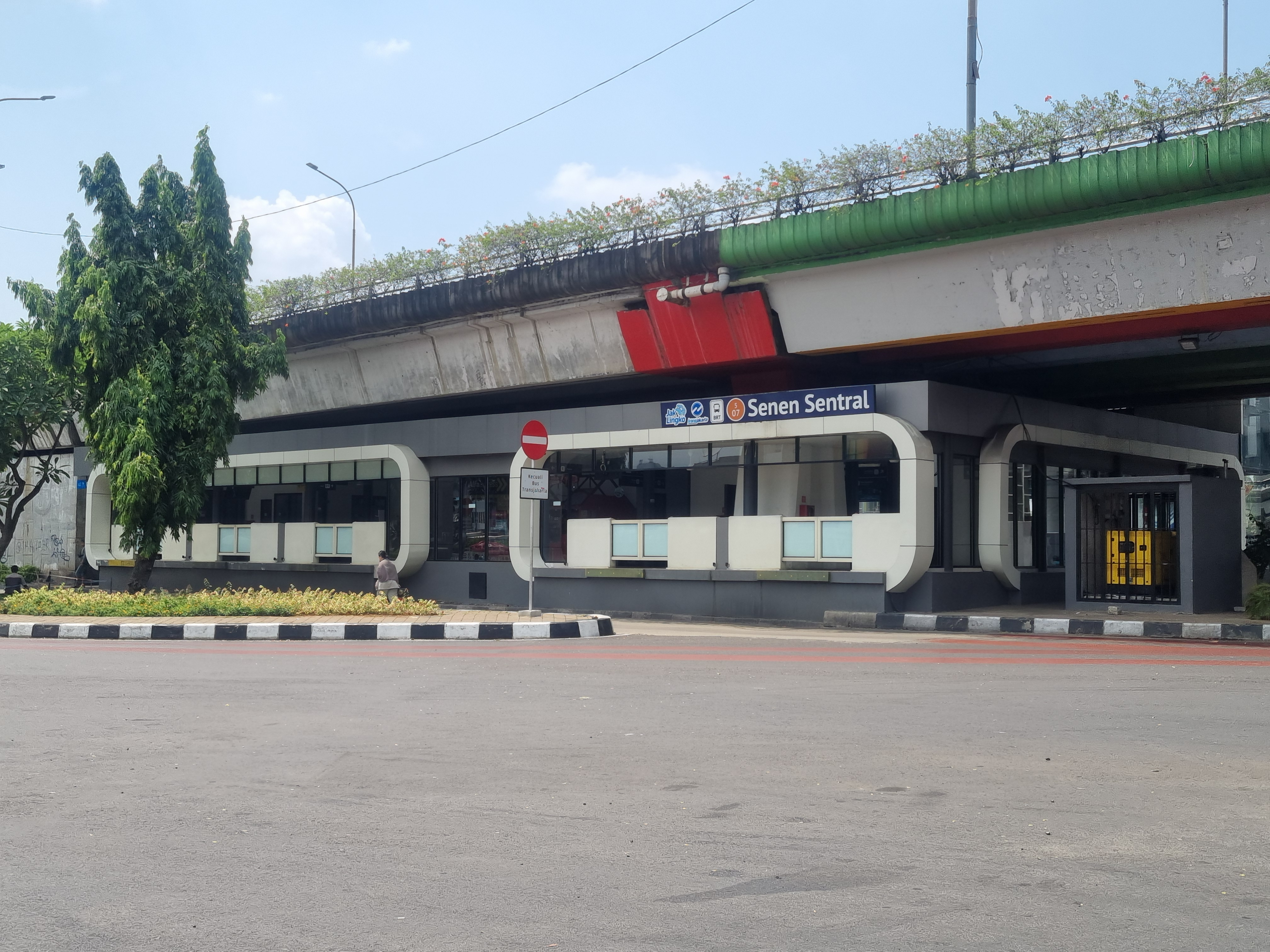
Southwest view of the revitalized station in 2024. Note that the platform screen doors were still visible.

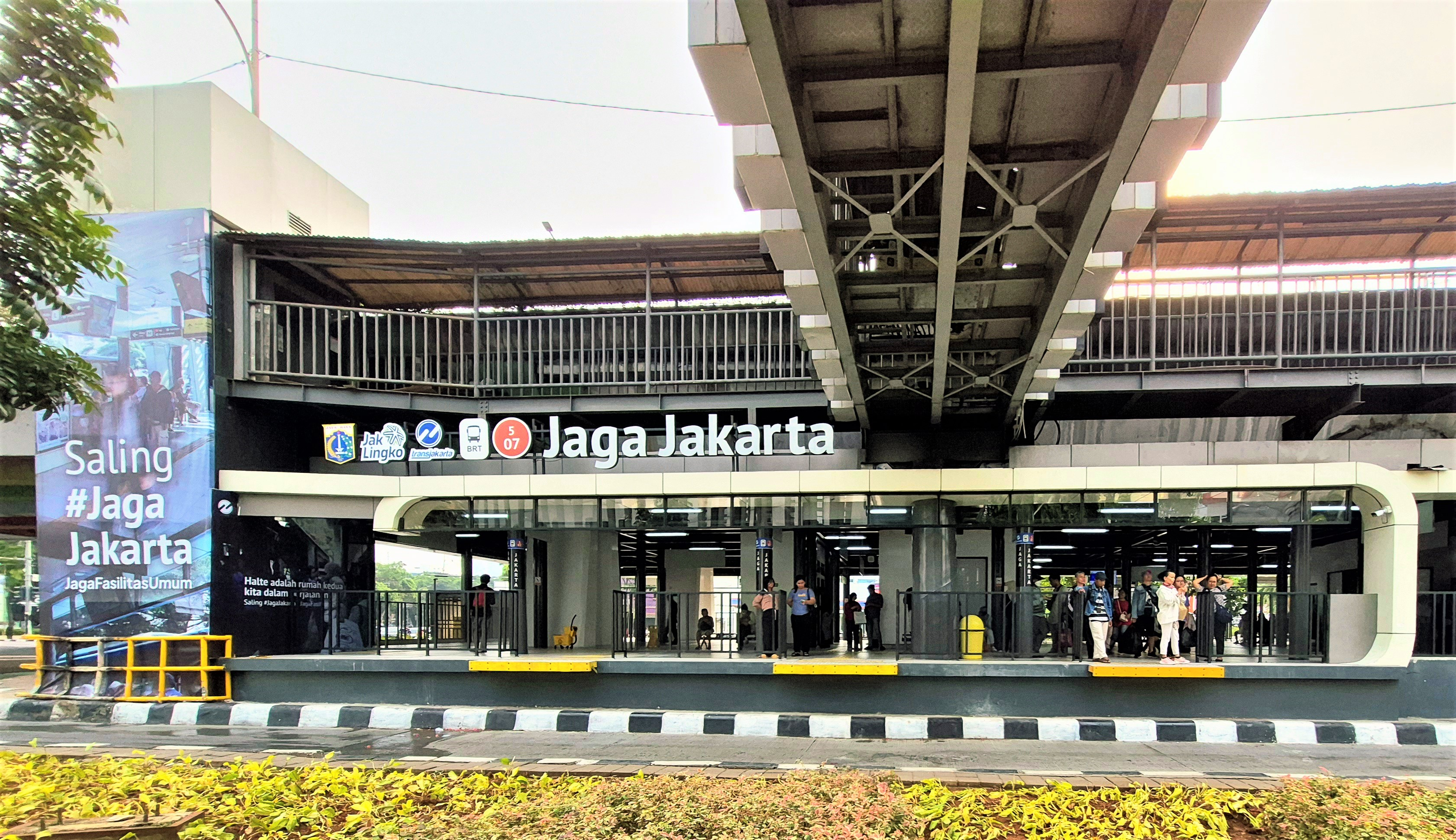
The station seen from a small park on the east, 2025

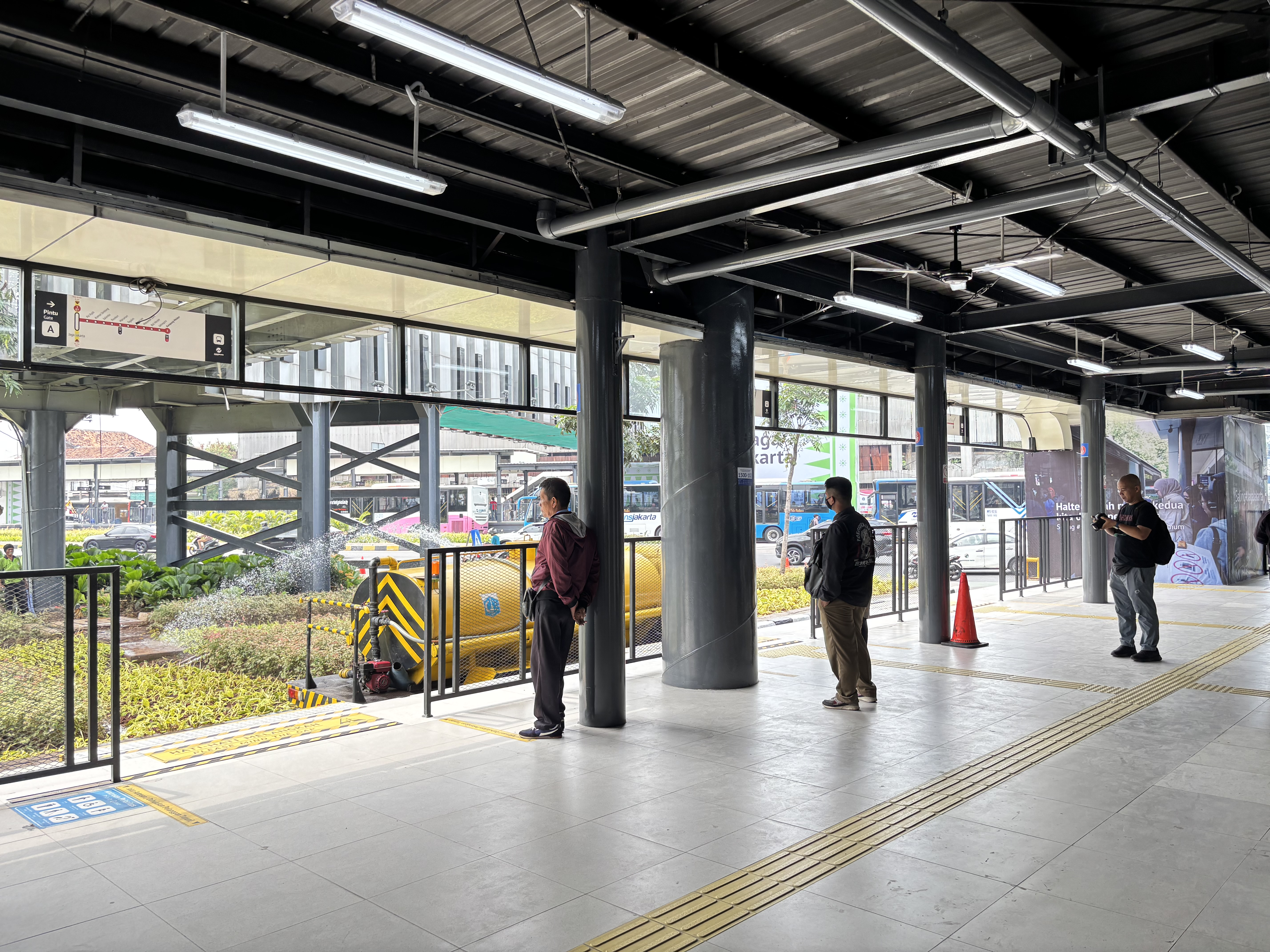
Eastern platform, 2025

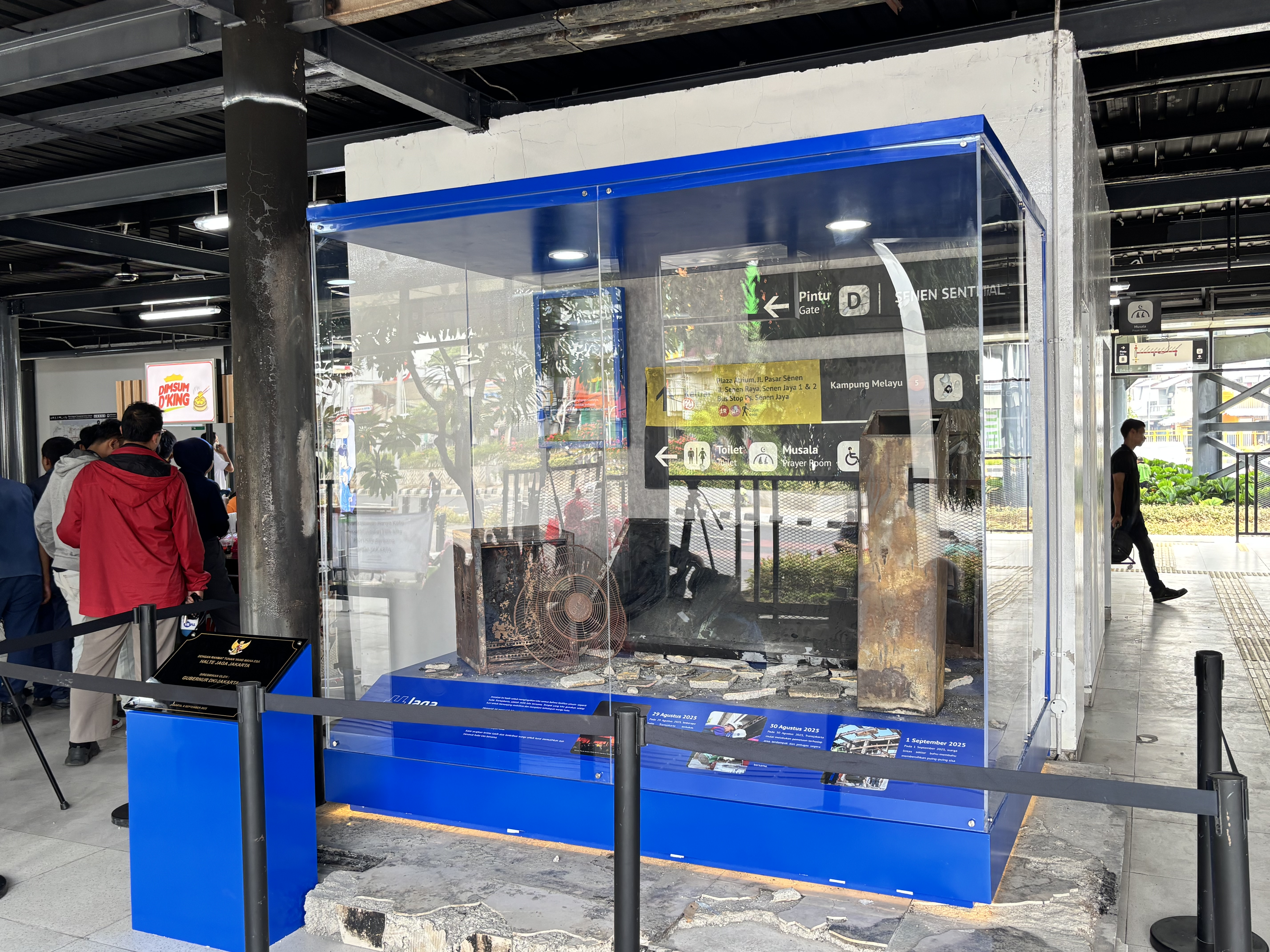
A glass box containing remnants from the arson incident during the widespread protests in late August 2025, which includes a scorched TV set, turnstile and wall fan.

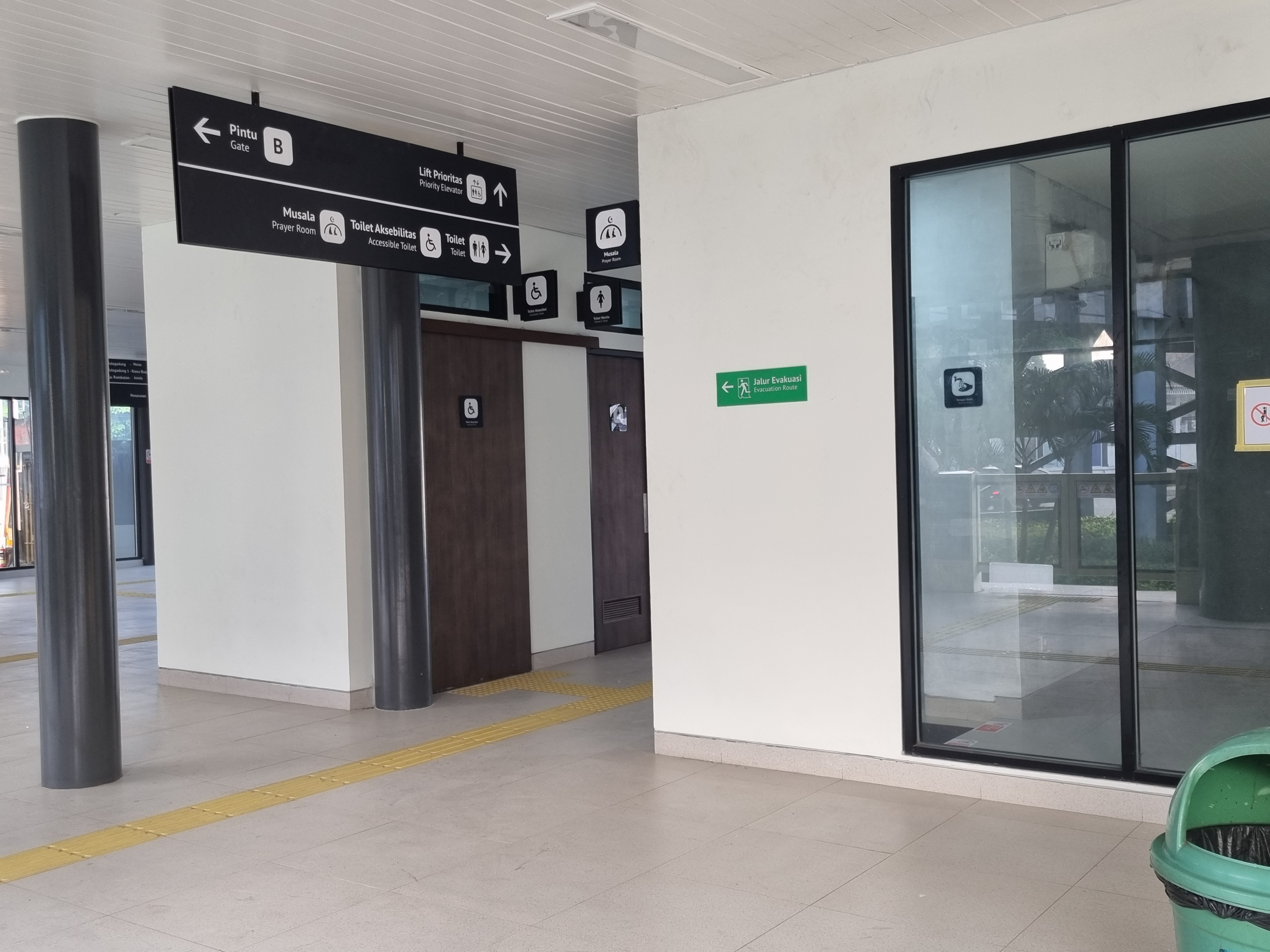
Toilets and prayer rooms, 2023
