= Senen Raya (Transjakarta) =

Bus rapid transit station in Jakarta, Indonesia

2 13 14 02 Senen Raya
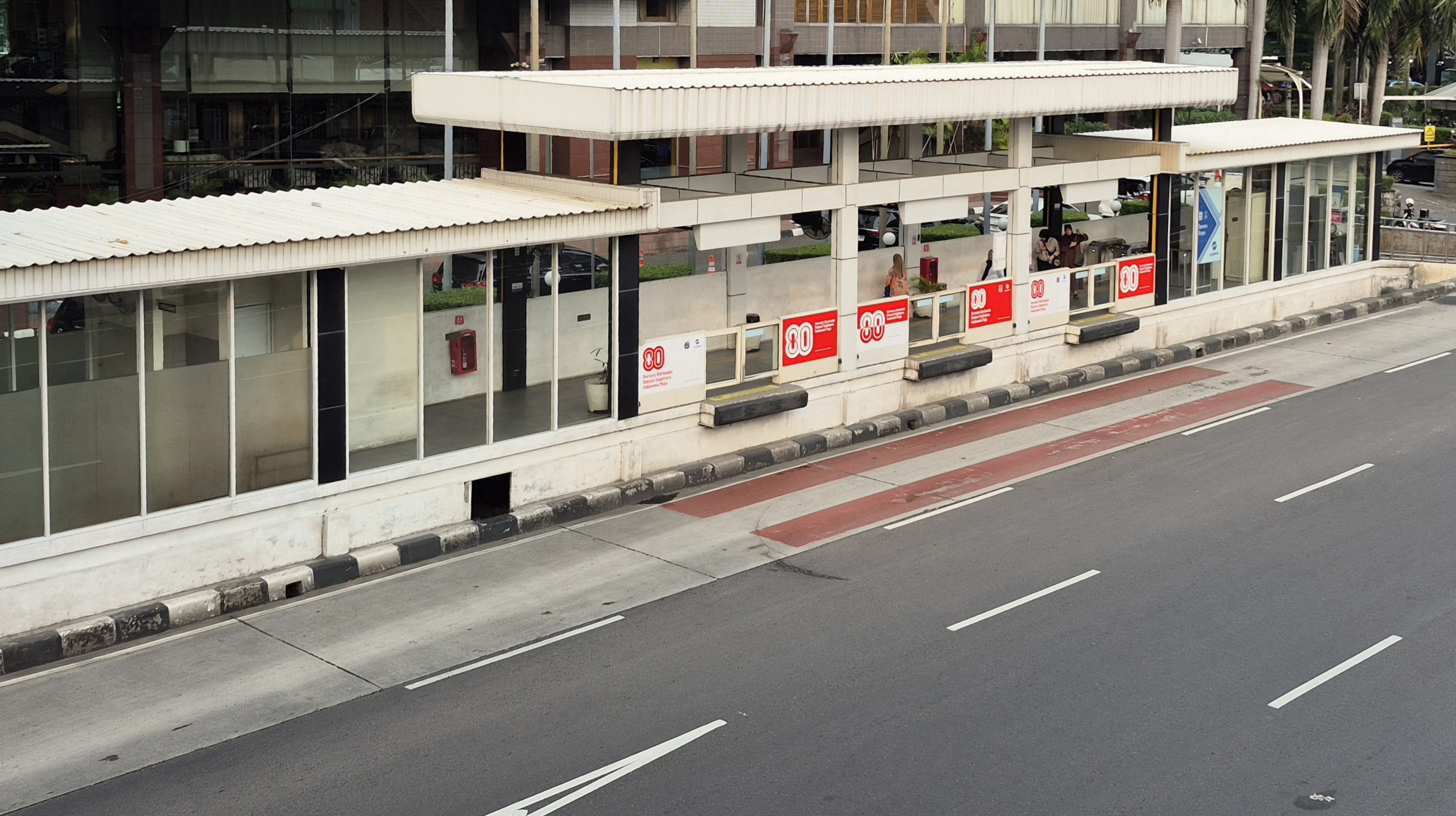
- The station viewed from the access bridge

General information
- Location: H. Imam Sapi'ie Street, Senen, Senen, Central Jakarta 10410, Indonesia
- System: Transjakarta bus rapid transit station
- Owner: Transjakarta
- Operator: Transjakarta
- Lines: List of Transjakarta corridors#Corridor 2 List of TransJakarta corridors#Corridor 14
- Platforms: Single side platform

Construction
- Structure type: At-grade
- Cycle facilities: No
- Accessible: Yes

Other information
- Status: In service

History
- Opened: 15 January 2006
- Rebuilt: 1 May 2020; 6 years ago
- Former names: Atrium Senen

Services
Preceding		Following
Senen Toyota Rangga One-way operation	Corridor 2	RSPAD towards Monumen Nasional
Senen Toyota Rangga One-way operation	Corridor 14 Terminus	Senen Toyota Rangga towards Jakarta International Stadium
Location

Senen Raya is a Transjakarta bus rapid transit station located on H. Imam Sapi'ie Street, Senen, Senen, Central Jakarta, Indonesia, serving Corridors 2 and 14. It is located right in front of Millenium Mall.

== History ==
The station opened on 15 January 2006 as Atrium Senen, a name taken from the former name of Millenium Mall it serves, Plaza Atrium. It was originally built on the road median. The old station structure, located on then-named Senen Raya Street, had a skybridge in front of Djakarta Lloyd Building and Plaza Atrium. The station only had one gate on the west-facing side.

Atrium BRT station was then demolished during the construction of Senen traffic tunnel (Underpass Senen) extension. The new station was rebuilt and opened on 1 May 2020 after being relocated to the front of Lumiere Hotel.

On 15 November 2023, the station was renamed Senen Raya in preparation of the launch of Corridor 14, but the renaming was officially announced sometime around December 2023 and January 2024. It was named after the street it was located on, which at the time was called Senen Raya Street, before getting renamed H. Imam Sapi'ie Street.

== Building and layout ==
The station is one of the 11 station located on Corridor 2's western loop, and as such only serves in one direction.

The current station building has three gates and amenities such as priority toilet and prayer room. It's also one of the few stations located on the sidewalk where buses open the right-side doors. The access bridge has an iconic facade that resembles the gigi balang element on the traditional houses of the Betawi people, Jakarta's native ethnic group.

Northeast
Side platform, the platform doors are opened on the right side of the direction of travel
Southwest	↱ (Senen Toyota Rangga)	towards Monumen Nasional and towards Jakarta International Stadium
Southwest	← (RSPAD)	towards Monumen Nasional and towards Jakarta International Stadium

== Non-BRT bus services ==
Jenis	Route	Destination	Notes
Inner city feeder		Senen—Lebak Bulus	Inside the station
Inner city feeder		Senen—Blok M	Outside the station
Inner city feeder		Tanah Abang Station—Senen	Outside the station
Inner city feeder		Dukuh Atas TOD—Senen	Outside the station
Inner city feeder		Tanjung Priok—Senen via BMW Park	Outside the station
Mikrotrans Jak Lingko	JAK 17	Pulo Gadung–Senen	Outside the station
Mikrotrans Jak Lingko	JAK 23	Pisangan Baru—Senen	Outside the station

== Places nearby ==
- Millenium Mall
- Gatot Subroto Army Hospital

== Gallery ==
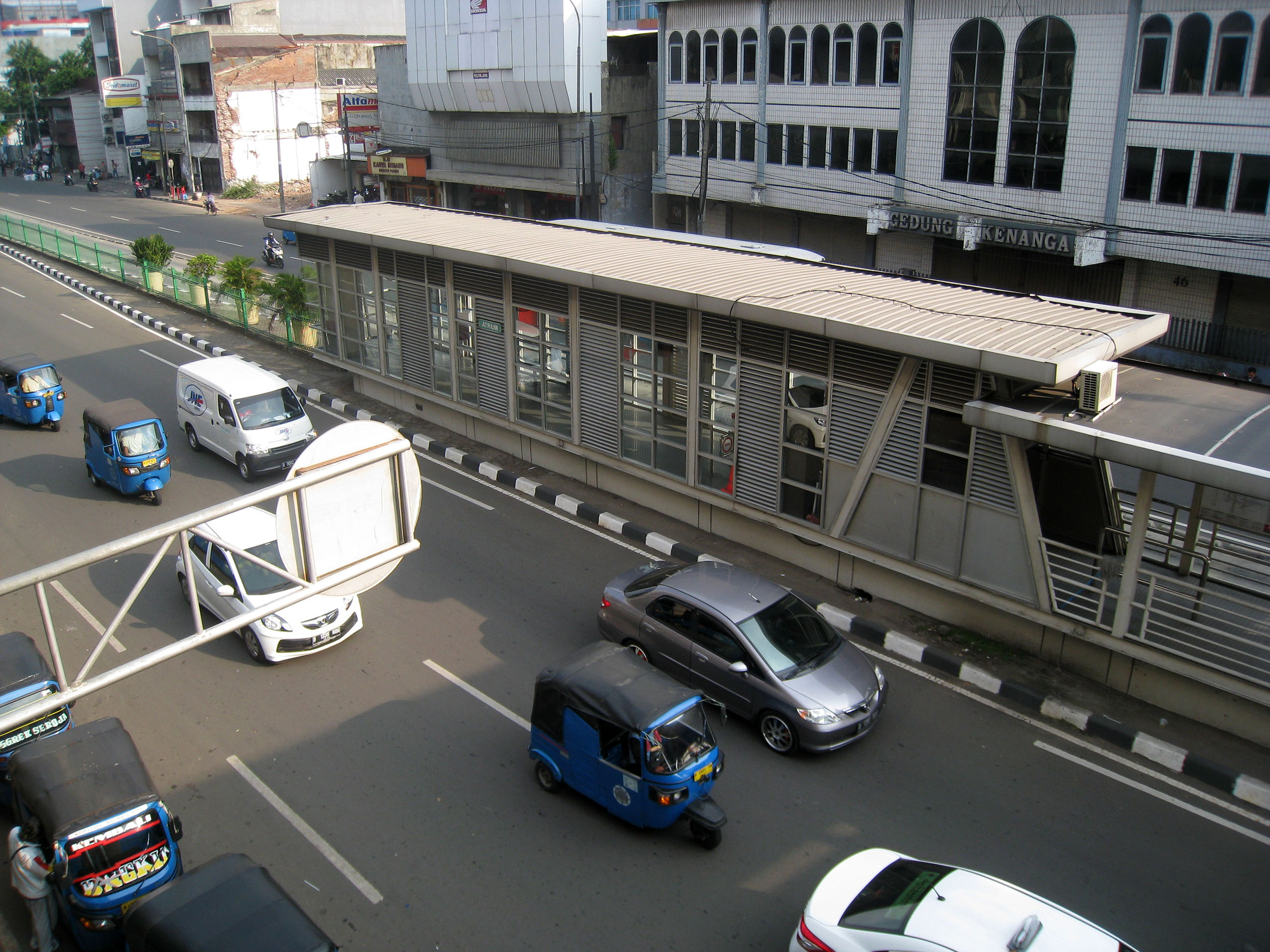
The original station building seen from the original skybridge, 2016

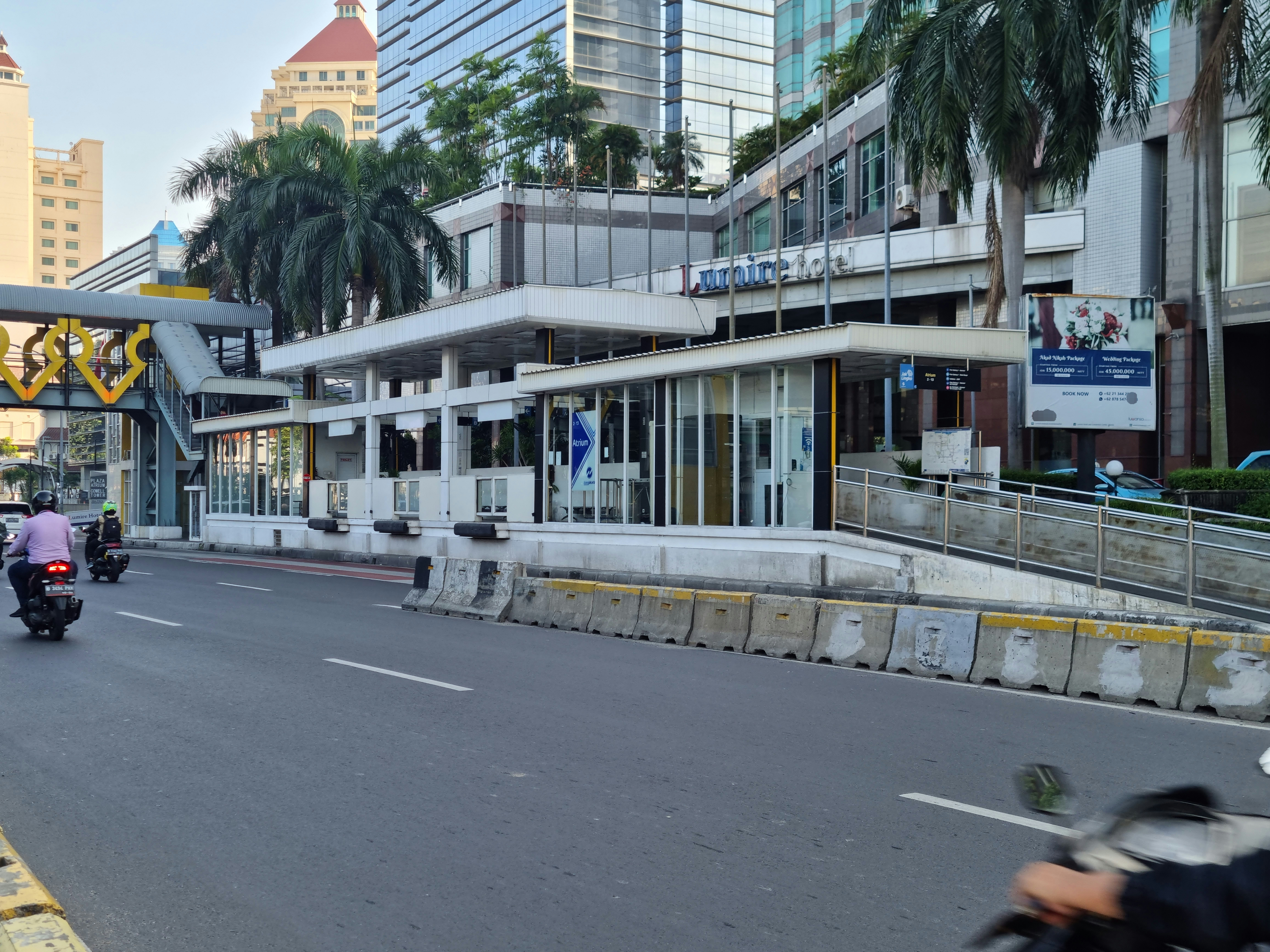
The new station building, 2022

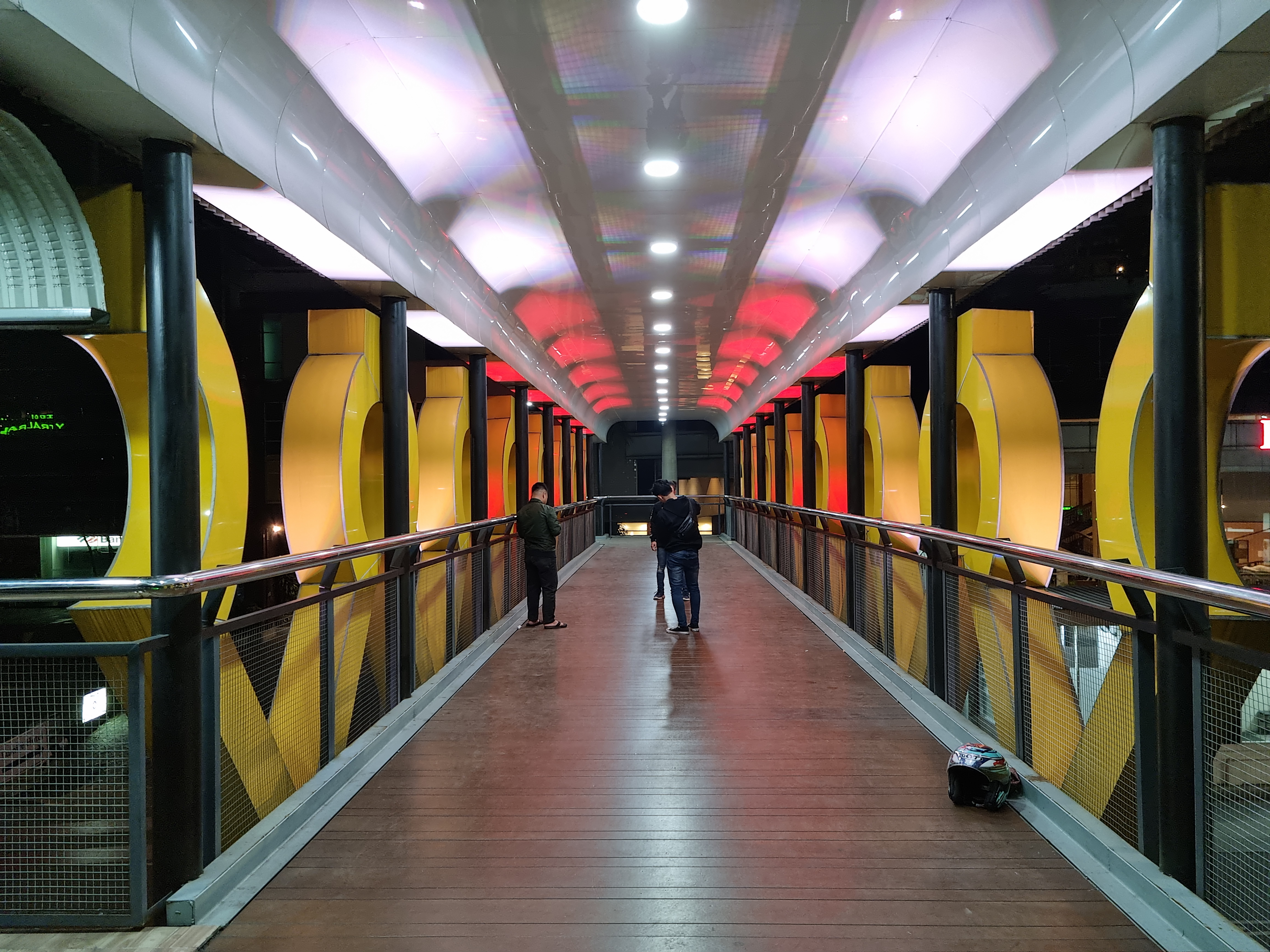
Interior of the new skybridge, 2022

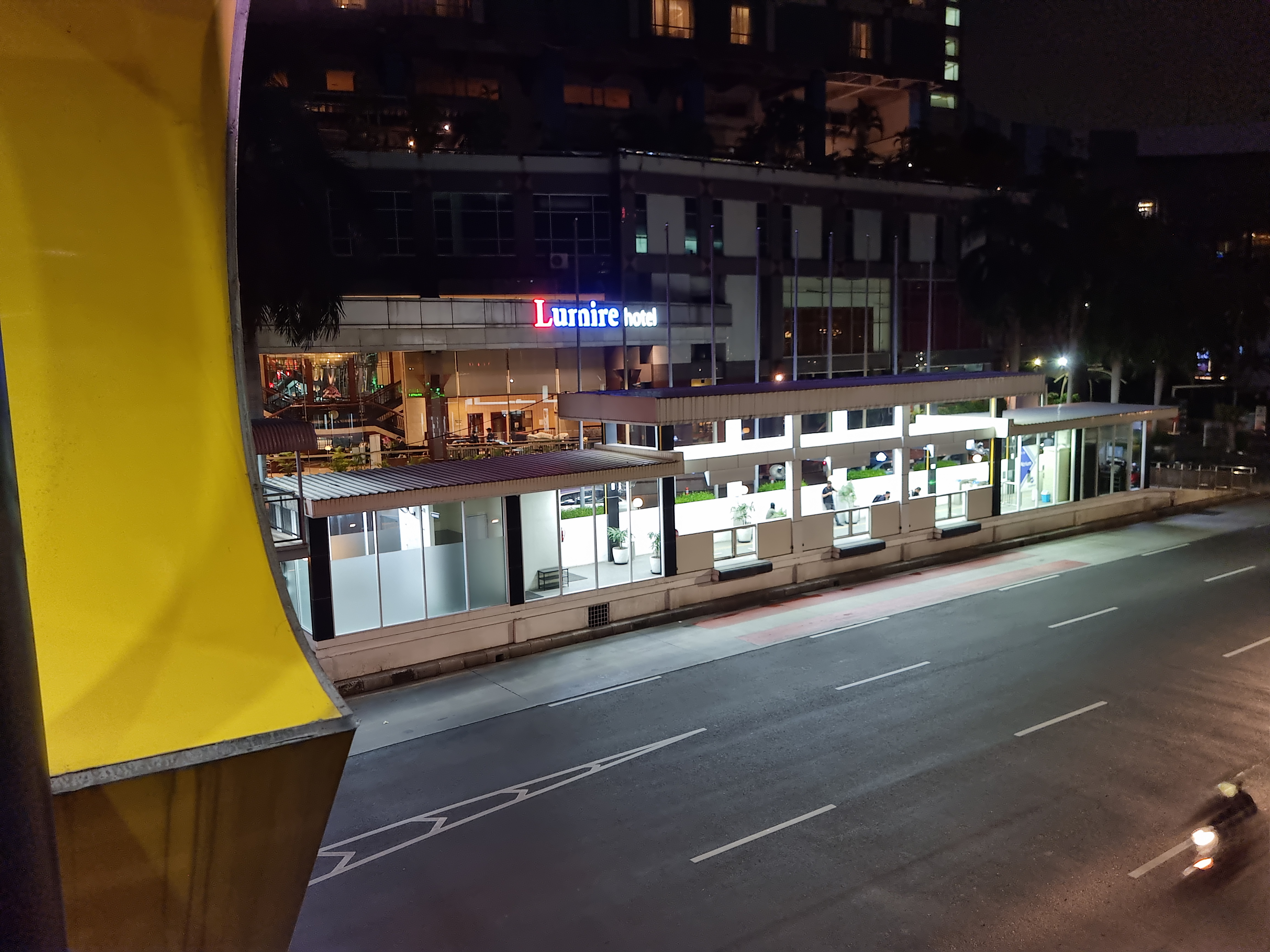
The new station viewed from the skybridge at night, 2022

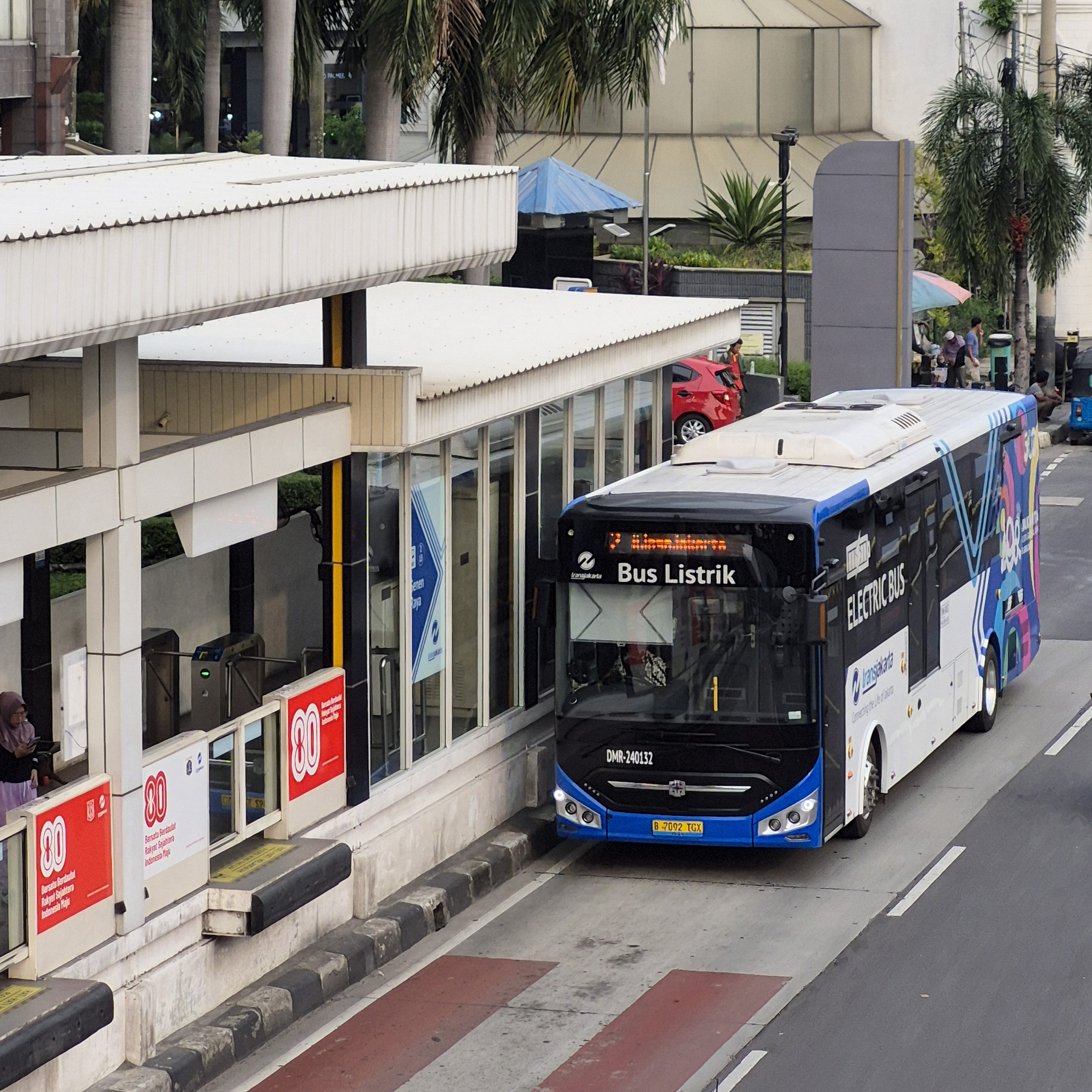
Corridor 2 bus entering the station, 2025
