= Senen Toyota Rangga (Transjakarta) =

Bus rapid transit station in Jakarta, Indonesia

2 12 14 01 Senen Toyota Rangga
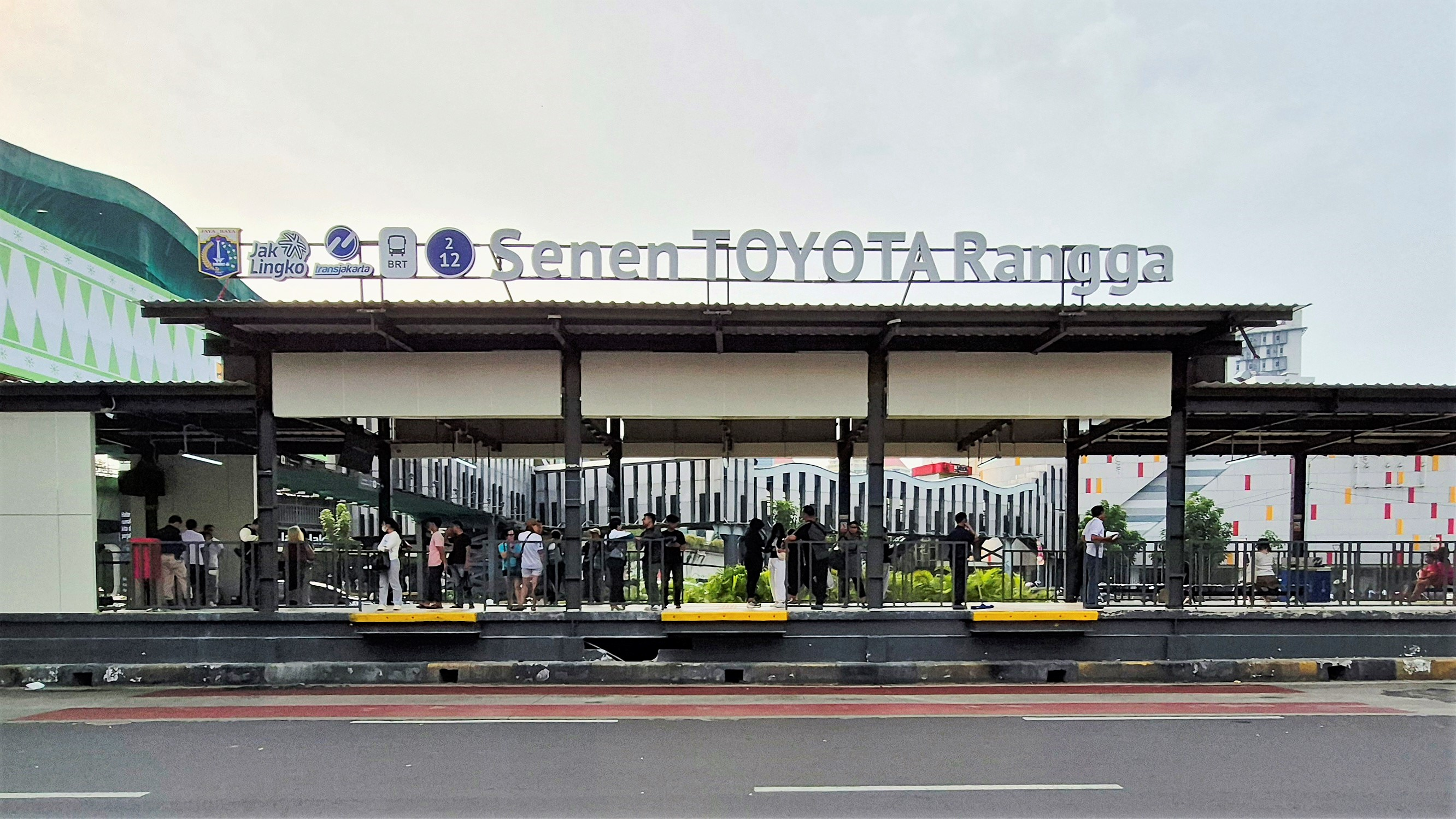
- Side view of the station in September 2025

General information
- Location: Letjen Suprapto Street, Kramat, Senen, Central Jakarta, Jakarta, Indonesia
- System: Transjakarta bus rapid transit station
- Owner: Transjakarta
- Operator: Transjakarta
- Lines: List of Transjakarta corridors#Corridor 2 List of Transjakarta corridors#Cross-corridor routes List of TransJakarta corridors#Cross-corridor routes List of TransJakarta corridors#Corridor 14
- Platforms: Single island platform
- Connections: Jaga Jakarta; Pasar Senen

Construction
- Structure type: At-grade
- Cycle facilities: No
- Accessible: Yes

Other information
- Status: In service

History
- Opened: 15 January 2006
- Rebuilt: 8 September 2025; 11 months ago (after August 2025 riot incident)
- Former names: Pasar Senen (2023-2025)

Services
Preceding		Following
Galur One-way operation	Corridor 2	Senen Raya towards Monumen Nasional
Galur towards Pulo Gadung	Corridor 2	Kwitang One-way operation
Galur towards Pulo Gadung	Corridor 2 Route 2A	Kwitang towards Rawa Buaya
Galur towards Kampung Rambutan	Corridor 7 Route 7F	Kwitang towards Juanda
Senen Raya Terminus	Corridor 14	Tanah Tinggi towards Jakarta International Stadium
Lapangan Banteng towards Ancol	Corridor 5 transfer at Jaga Jakarta	Pal Putih towards Kampung Melayu
Location

Senen (or Senen Toyota Rangga, (Note: Stylized as Senen TOYOTA Rangga) with Toyota Astra Motor granted for naming rights) is a Transjakarta bus rapid transit station located at the western end of Letjen Suprapto street in Senen, Jakarta, Indonesia, which serves corridors 2 and 14. It is connected to Jaga Jakarta station that serves Corridor 5. The BRT station is located southwest of the Pasar Senen railway station.

== History ==
The station was opened on 15 January 2006, along with the opening of corridor 2. In early 2020, the original building was demolished to make way for the construction of the Senen underpass tunnel extension that passes underneath it. Routes were adjusted temporarily to remain operational during the construction. Transjakarta began to rebuild the station in August 2020, after the physical construction of the Senen tunnel was completed. The new building of the Senen station was opened to the public on 22 November 2020.

== Naming rights ==
On 20 November 2023, Senen BRT station was renamed into Pasar Senen. However, Transjakarta did not make an official statement about the renaming, but it was later revealed that the renaming was a part of the company's mass "neutralization" of BRT station names from third-party names (e.g. unofficial use of cooperate names, government institutions and individuals), that allow those renamed stations to grant an official naming right.

On 17 April 2025, automobile company Toyota Astra Motor (TAM), a subsidiary of Astra International (currently holding the right for Bundaran HI BRT station), bought the naming rights for Pasar Senen BRT station in a two-year contract. The station name was reverted again to Senen, imbued with the brand name TOYOTA Rangga to foster the promotion of their compact commercial pickup truck, Toyota Hilux Rangga, which claimed to have "relevance with the Senen region as a centuries-old economic development center."

== Building and layout ==
The current 2020 building of Senen Toyota Rangga BRT station is wider than the previous one, and equipped with accessible toilets and lactation rooms. It now has a total of nine platform bays (six for each side). The building now only consist of simple black-painted exposed steel structure and half-height black trellis. The access bridge was also renovated in 2020 with an iconic design that resembles the piano keys, eqquiped with elevators for prioritized passengers (e.g. disabled people).

Northeast	to Pulo Gadung, to Kampung Rambutan, and to JIS (Galur/Tanah Tinggi) →
Island platform, the platform doors are opened on the right side of the direction of travel
Southeast	← (Senen Raya/Kwitang) to Monas, to Rawa Buaya, to Juanda, and to Senen Raya

== Non-BRT bus services ==
Service type	Route	Destination	Notes
Jakarta Fair feeder		Pulo Gadung–JIEXPO Kemayoran	Only operates during the Jakarta Fair and/or other events on JIExpo Kemayoran. Inside the station
Inner-city feeder		Senen–Blok M	Outside the station
Inner-city feeder		Senen–Tanah Abang Station	Outside the station
Inner-city feeder		Tanjung Priok–Senen via JIS	Outside the station
Mikrotrans Jak Lingko	JAK-10B	Gondangdia–Cikini via Kramat Raya	Outside the station
Mikrotrans Jak Lingko	JAK-17	Pulo Gadung–Senen	Outside the station
Mikrotrans Jak Lingko	JAK-23	Pisangan Baru–Senen	Outside the station

== Places nearby ==
- Pasar Senen railway station
- Senen bus terminal
- Senen Market complex
- Kwitang Book Market

== Incidents ==
=== Riotings ===
==== 2020 Omnibus law protest ====
On 8 October 2020, rioters of the omnibus law protest burned the two separated temporary buildings of the Senen BRT station and also damaged the then-unfinished new building of the station. The neighboring Senen Sentral (now Jaga Jakarta) station and an abandoned old movie theatre were also damaged as well.

==== August–September 2025 protests ====
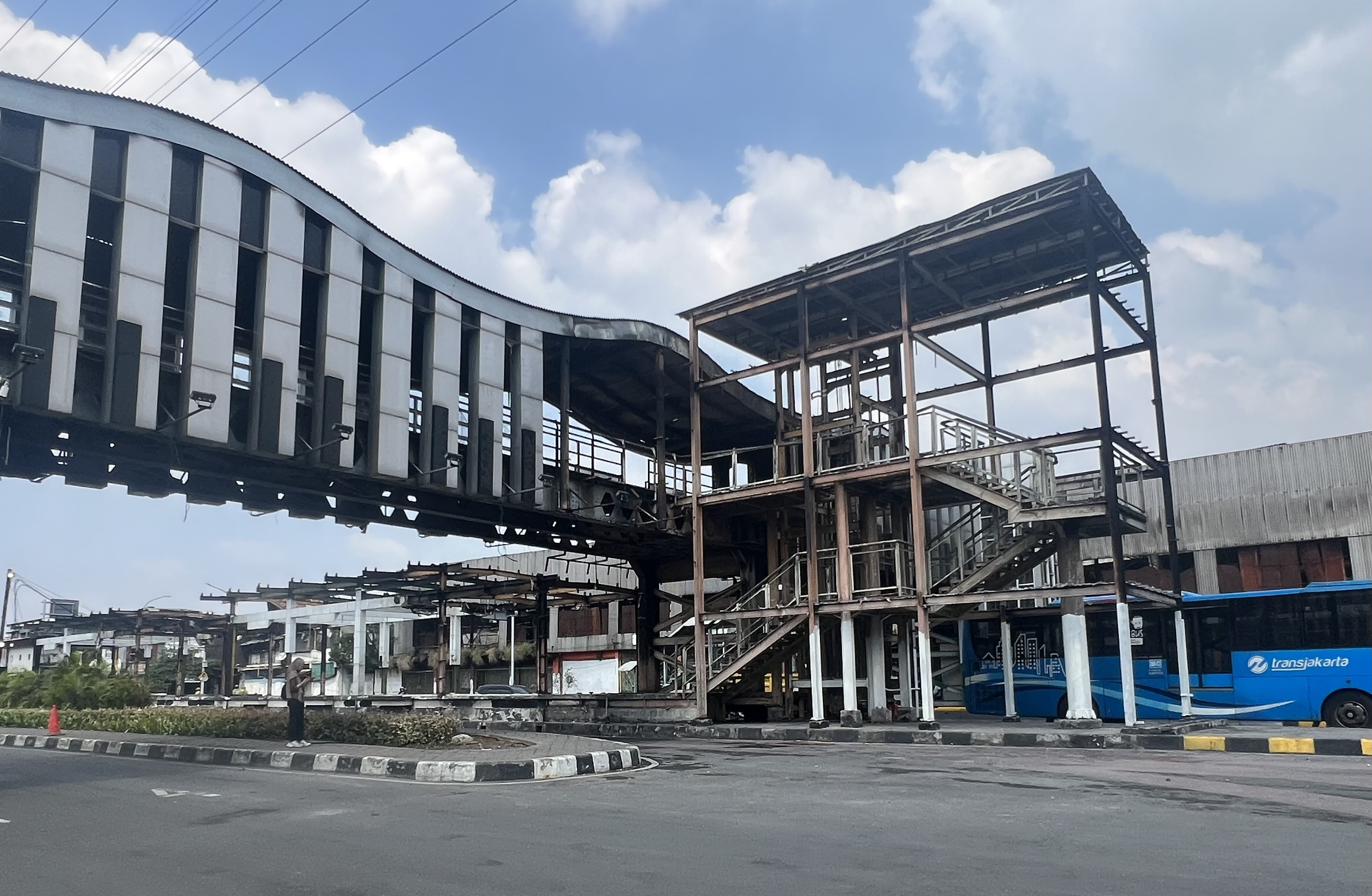
Senen Toyota Rangga BRT station after being burned during protests on 29 August 2025. Photo was taken three days later.

On 29 August 2025, Senen BRT station was severely burned by rioters (alleged to be provocators) during widespread protests that day, as it is located only 350 metres (380 yd) east of the Headquarters of the Mobile Brigade Corps Command for the Greater Jakarta Police in Kwitang, one of the main targets of the protest. A large flame had almost entirely melted the building, as well the central staircase and elevator, and parts of the connection bridge. The building's architectural elements such as glass walls, half-height platform screen doors, white aluminum composite panels that covered the steel structure, and a decorative element on the roof that resembles the Betawi traditional house ornament gigi balang were consumed by the flame. The elevators for disabled access were also damaged. Some properties inside were looted and set ablaze.

On 8 September 2025, Senen BRT station was reopened after reparations, with the building now only consist of exposed steel structure and simple half-height black trellis that replaced the screen doors. Its access bridge was still closed that day for reparations by the Ministry of Public Works due to the severe damage. In response, Transjakarta operated 21ST shuttle route to sustain the transfer process between Senen and Jaga Jakarta BRT stations while the bridge was being repaired, stopping at both stations plus two bus stops near the railway station, and was available 24 hours a day. Temporary zebra crossings were provided to access Senen BRT station. On 4 June 2026, the access bridge was fully repaired and the 21ST shuttle route was decommissioned.

=== Others ===
On 6 February 2025, the elevators for disabled access went out of power. There were two people trapped inside one of the elevators. Firefighters were deployed to evacuate the victims. Since then, the elevators were left unoperational.

== Gallery ==
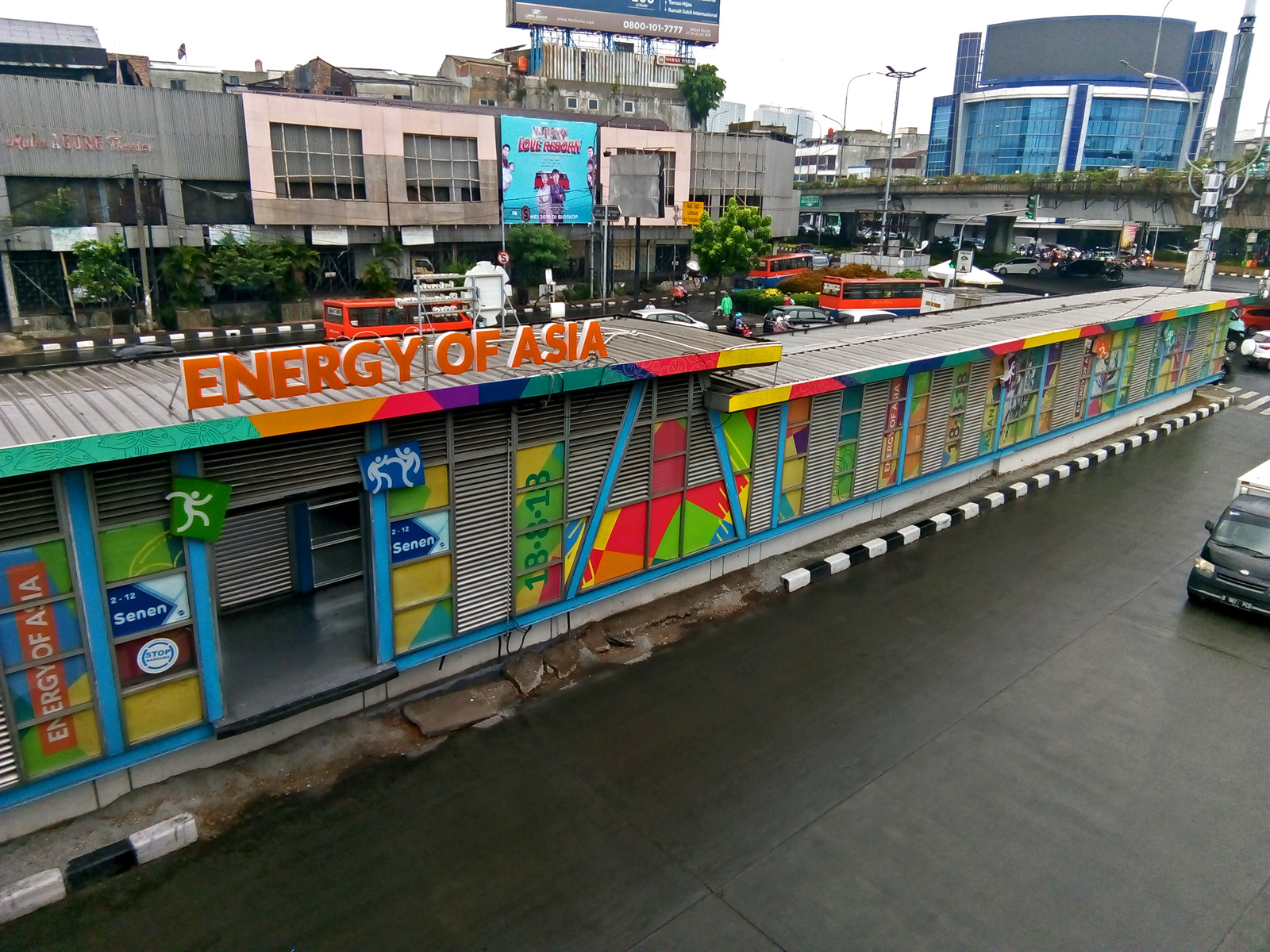
The old building of station in 2018, decorated with the 2018 Asian Games livery

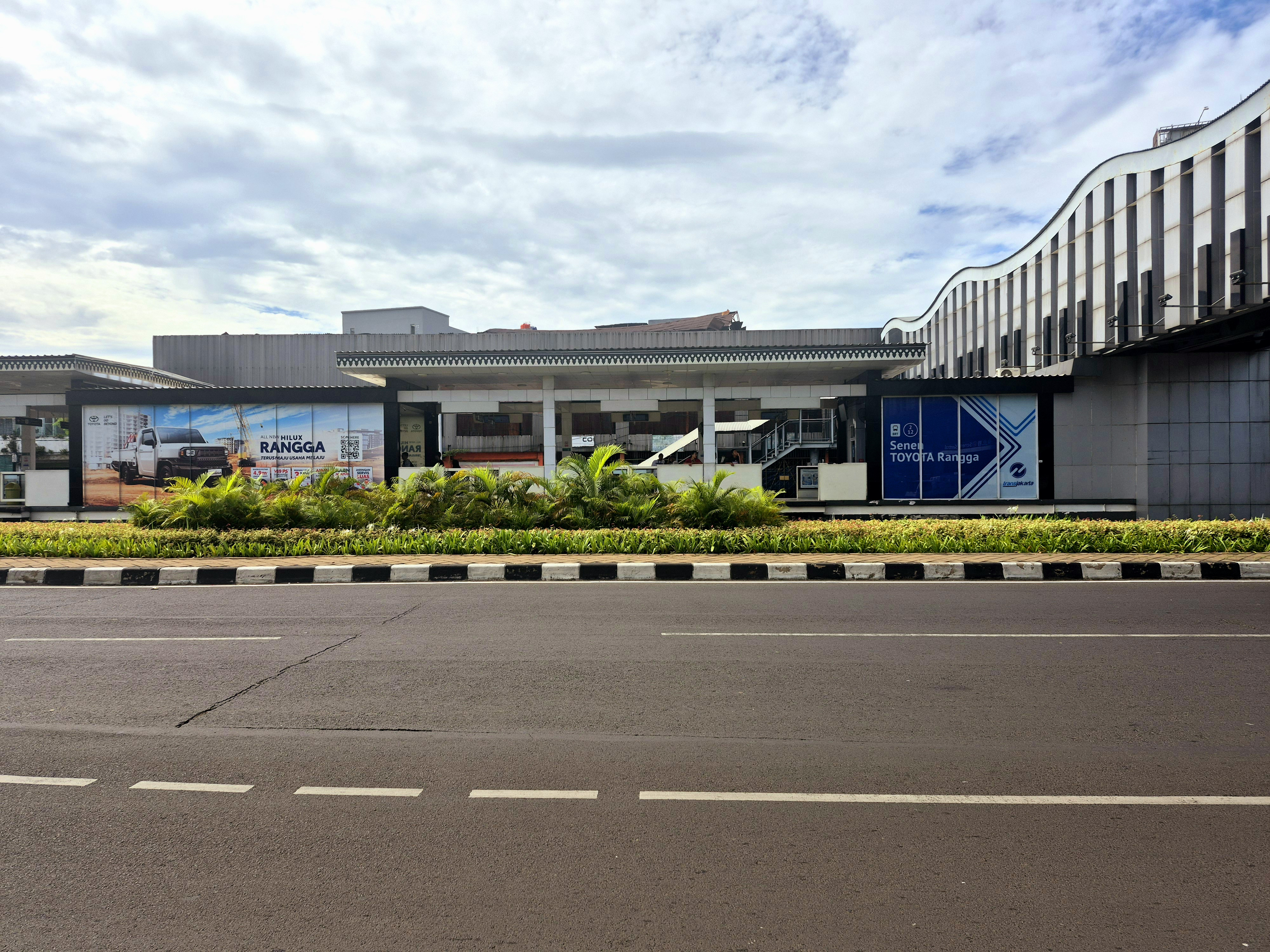
North facade of the station taken in April 2025, four months prior to the arson

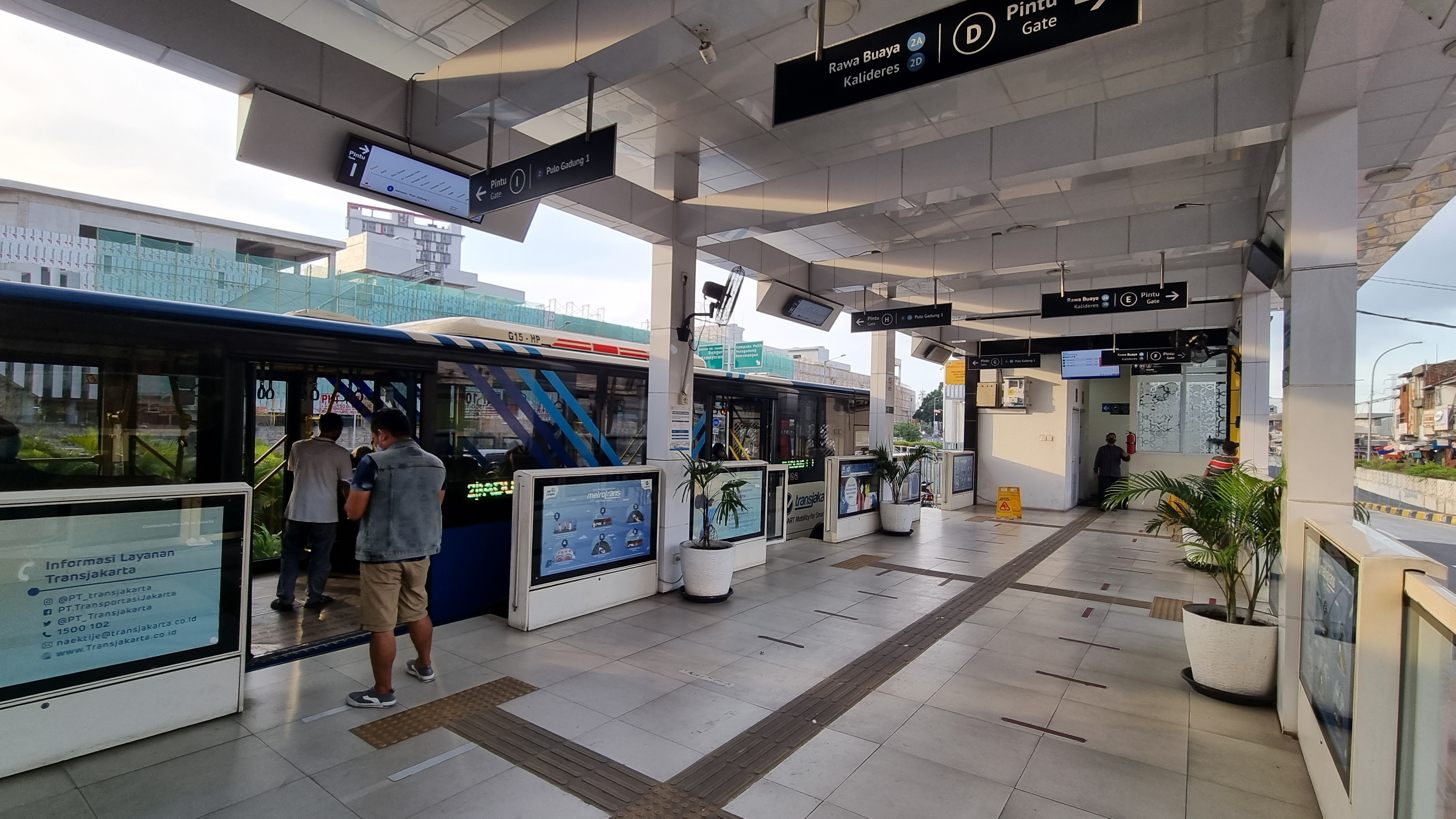
Platform area seen in 2022. Note that all architectural elements such as the half-height platform screen doors were replaced with simple black trellis and the roof structure was left exposed after reparations following the arson incident.

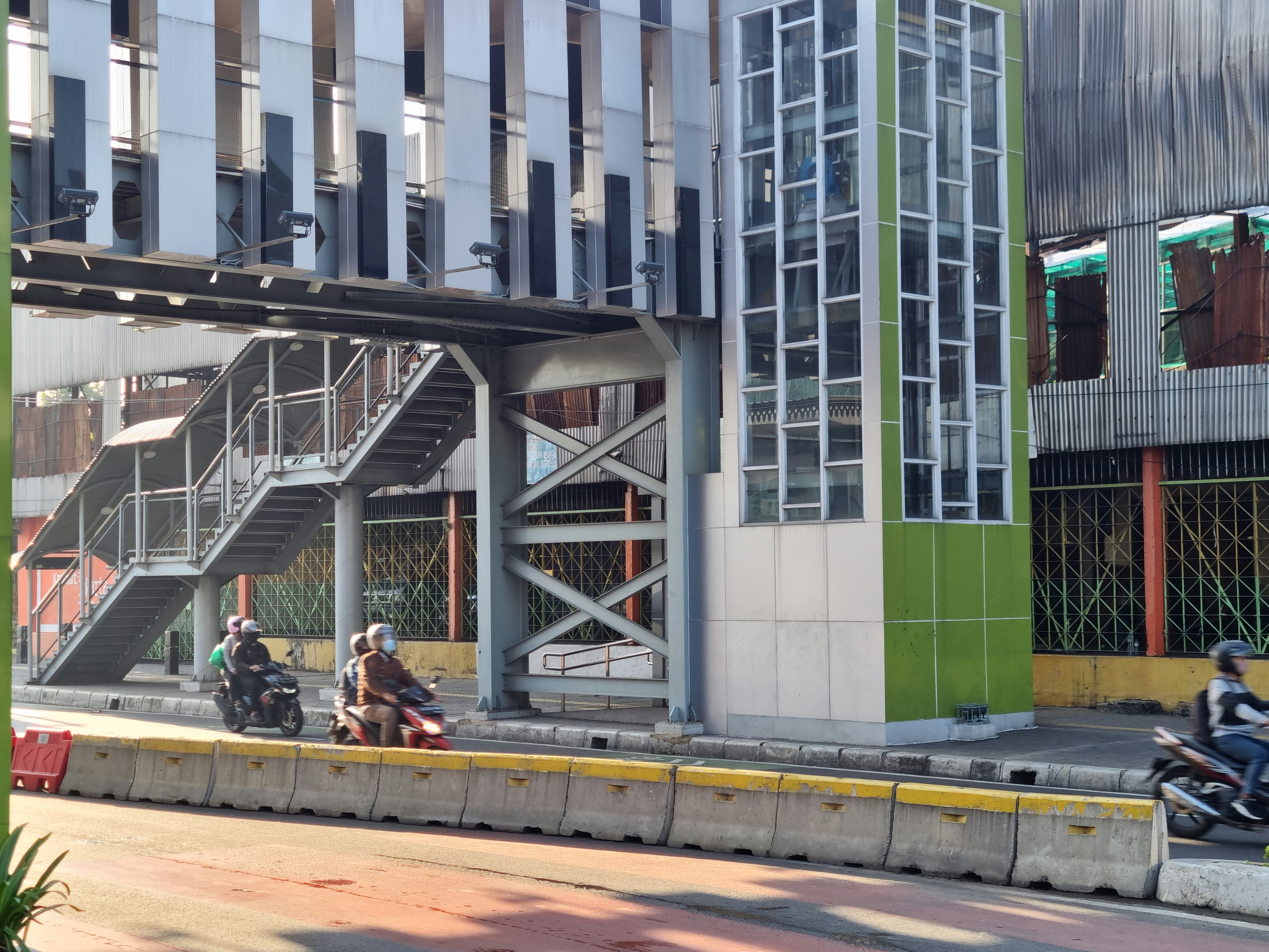
The elevator access on the connection bridge, 2022
