= Kwitang (Transjakarta) =

Bus rapid transit station in Jakarta, Indonesia

2 24 Kwitang
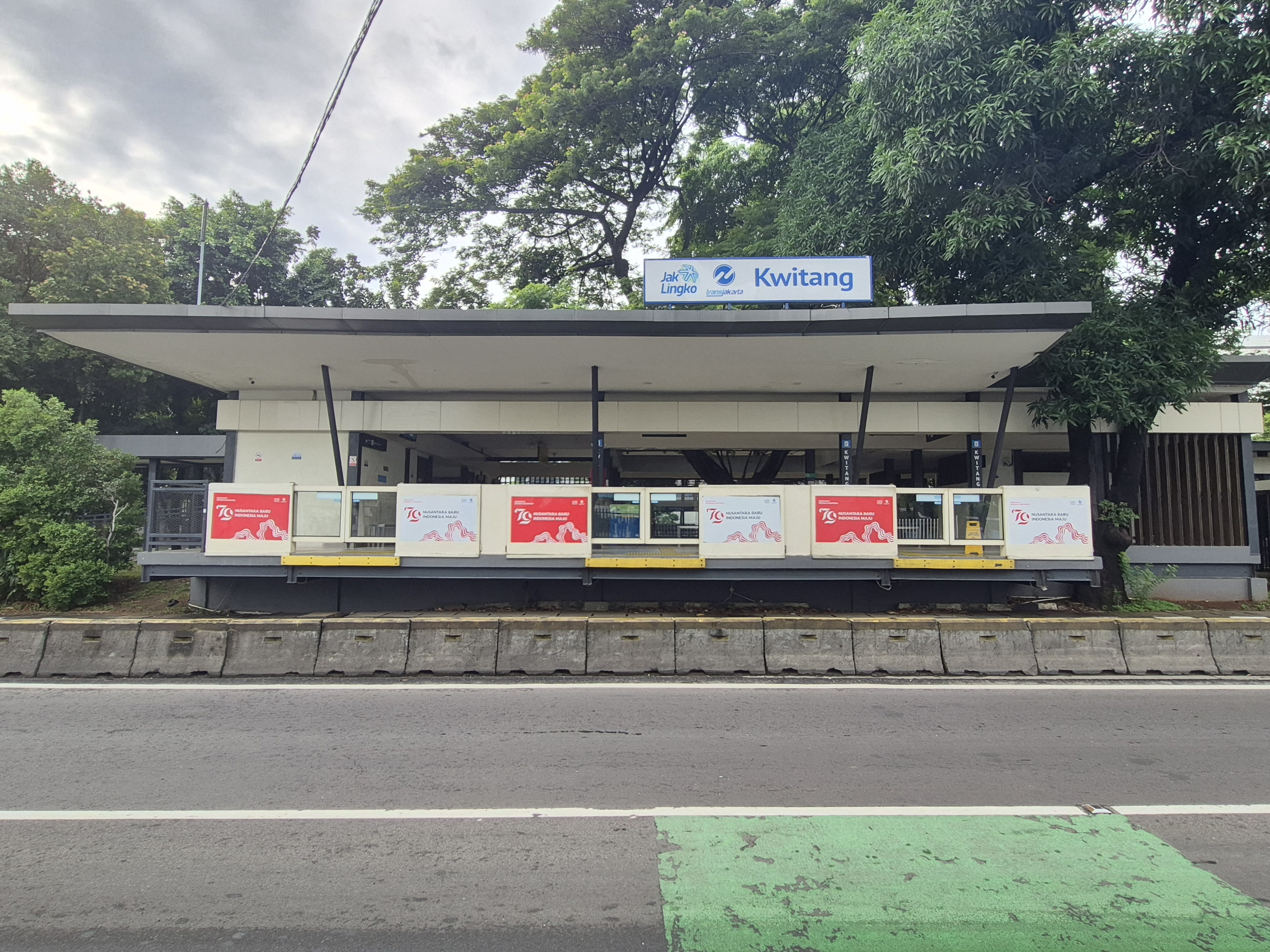
- North face of the station

General information
- Location: Kwitang Raya Street and Prajurit KKO Usman dan Harun Street; Kwitang (southern side); Senen (northern side); Senen, Central Jakarta 10410, Indonesia
- System: TransJakarta bus rapid transit station
- Owner: Transjakarta
- Operator: Transjakarta
- Lines: List of Transjakarta corridors#Corridor 2 List of Transjakarta corridors#Cross-corridor routes List of TransJakarta corridors#Cross-corridor routes
- Platforms: Single island platform

Construction
- Structure type: At-grade

Other information
- Status: In service

History
- Opened: 15 January 2006
- Rebuilt: 11 August 2022; 4 years ago

Services
Preceding		Following
Senen Toyota Rangga towards Pulo Gadung	Corridor 2	Gambir 2 One-way operation
Senen Toyota Rangga towards Pulo Gadung	Corridor 2 Route 2A	Gambir 2 One-way operation
Senen Toyota Rangga One-way operation	Corridor 2 Route 2A	Balai Kota towards Rawa Buaya
Balai Kota towards Juanda	Corridor 5 Route 5C	Pal Putih One-way operation
Senen Toyota Rangga One-way operation	Corridor 7 Route 7F	Balai Kota towards Juanda
Senen Toyota Rangga towards Kampung Rambutan	Corridor 7 Route 7F	Pasar Baru One-way operation
Location

Kwitang is a Transjakarta bus rapid transit station located between Kwitang Raya and Prajurit KKO Usman dan Harun streets in Senen district, Jakarta, Indonesia. The station serves eastbound corridor 2 buses, one way towards Pulo Gadung. It is also located south of the Museum of National Awakening. Despite its name, this station is not precisely located in Kwitang administrative village (kelurahan), but it is located at the borderline between Kwitang and its neighboring village, Senen, in the north.

== History ==
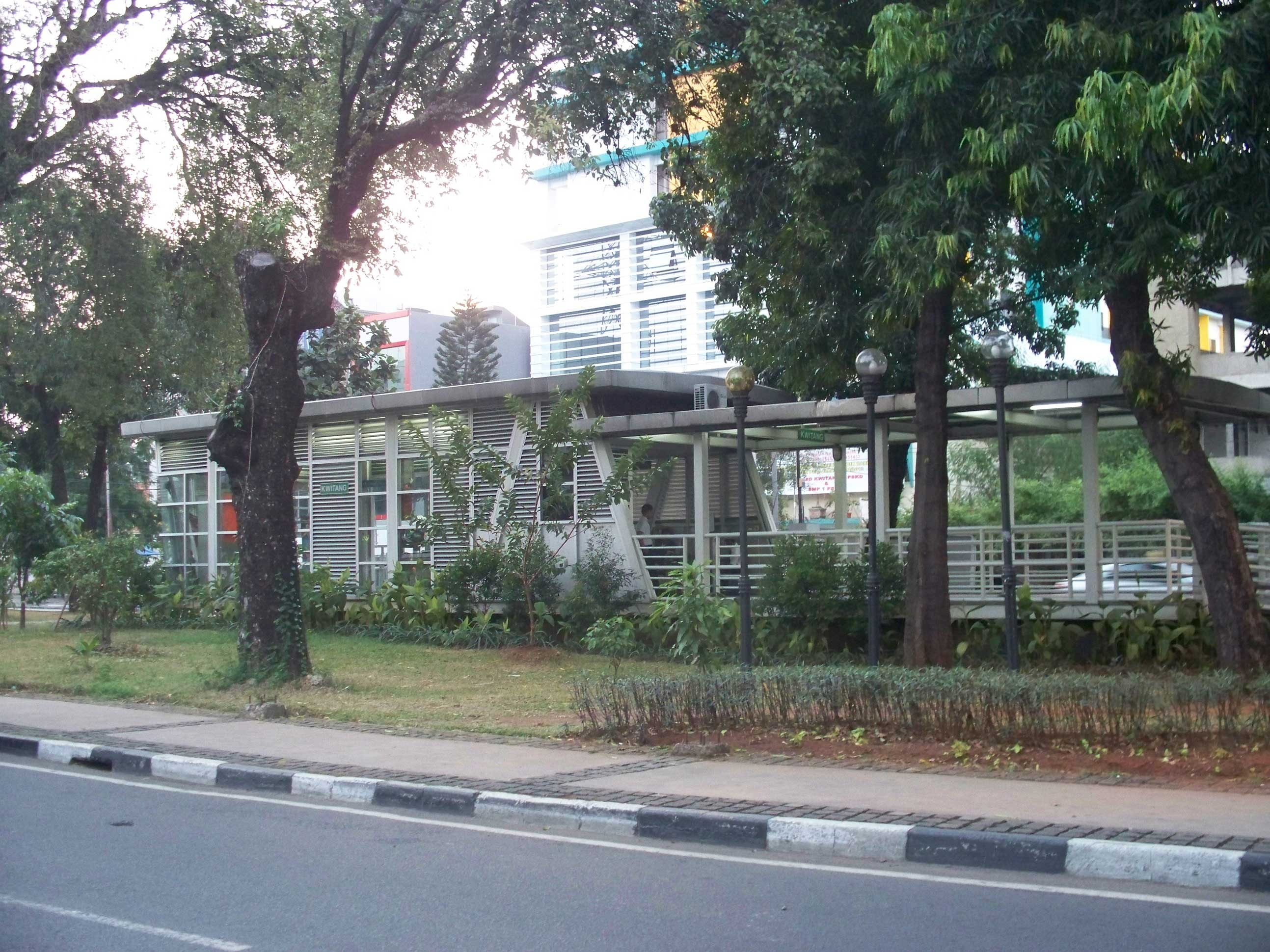
Kwitang BRT station in 2012

Kwitang BRT station was opened along with the inauguration of corridor 2 on 15 January 2006. The original building had a small size, with one platform bay only, and it only facing north (Prajurit KKO Usman dan Harun street). Because of its small size, articulated buses were unable to serve the station.

On 6 June 2021, Kwitang BRT station was closed and demolished for a revitalization. However, the reconstruction was not started until 15 April 2022, simultaneously with 10 other stations on different corridors, including Juanda and Balai Kota. On 11 August 2022, Kwitang BRT station was reopened to the public, and the station now is able to serve both eastbound and westbound buses.

== Building and layout ==
The new building faces both north and south sides, so the station can serve westbound buses, such as corridors 5C (Cililitan–Juanda) and 7F (Kampung Rambutan–Juanda (via Cempaka Putih)) on the south platform. The station now has 6 platform bays (3 on each direction), with automatic platform screen doors. Amenities like toilets and a prayer room (musala) have been included. The uniqueness of the station can be seen from a retained samanea saman or trembesi tree inside it. The surrounding area of the tree is sterilized, by providing a wide void with unconcreted soil area, allowing the tree to grow freely without interruptions.

North	to Pulo Gadung and to Kampung Rambutan (Senen Toyota Rangga) →
Island platform, the doors are opened on the right side of the direction of travel
South	← (Balai Kota) to Rawa Buaya and to Juanda

== Non-BRT bus services ==
Type	Route	Destination	Notes
Inner city feeder		Gondangdia Station–Senen	Outside the station
Inner city feeder		Senen–Blok M	Outside the station
Inner city feeder		Senen–Tanah Abang Station	Outside the station

== Places nearby ==
- BPK Gunung Mulia
- Museum of National Awakening
- Kwitang public health clinic (puskesmas)
- Al Habib Ali Al Habsyi Kwitang Taklim Assembly, Islamic Center Indonesia (ICI)
  - Tomb of Al Habib Ali Habsyi Kwitang
- Kwitang Indonesia Christian Church
- Indonesia Commodity and Derivatives Exchange

== Gallery ==
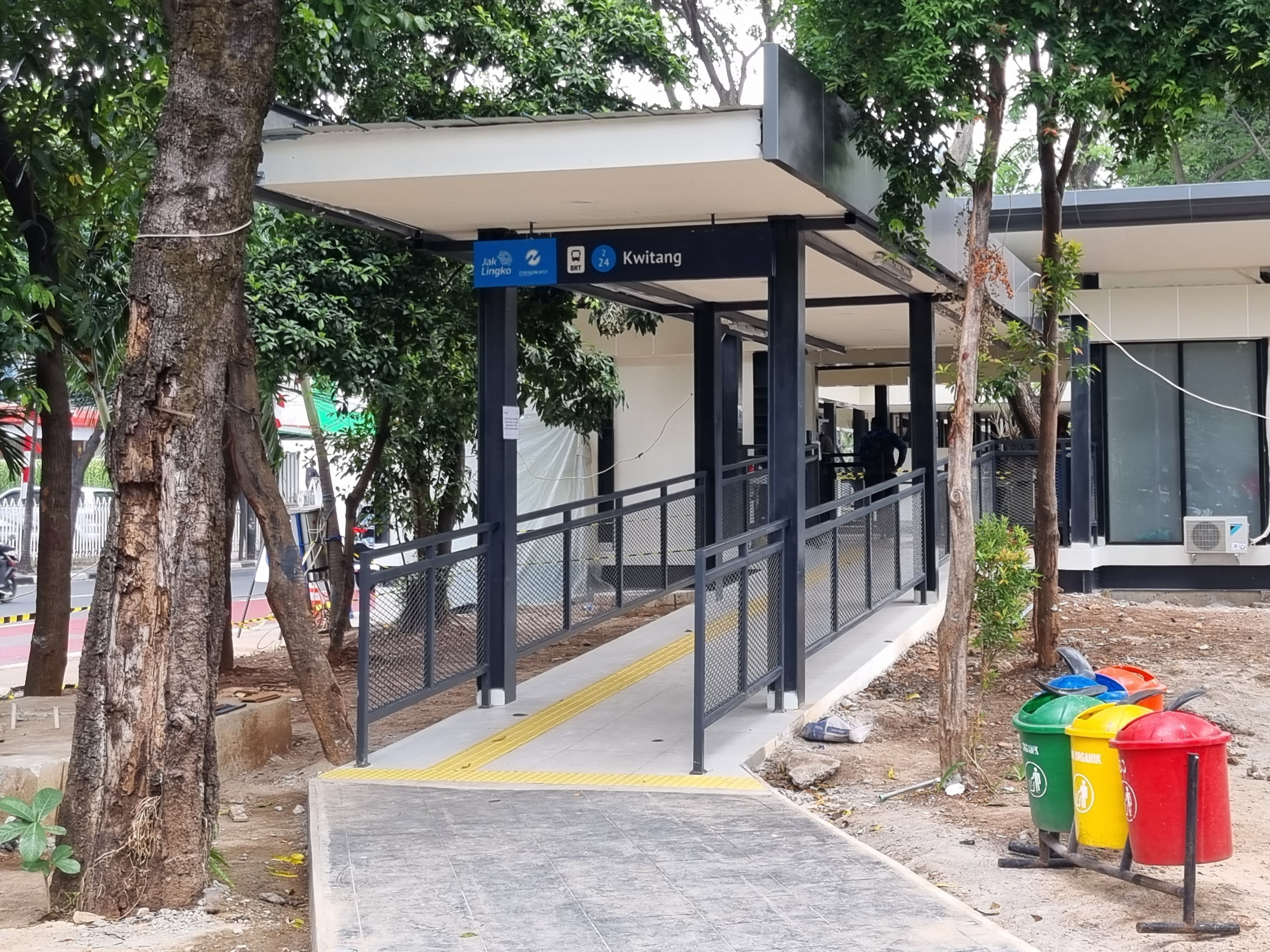
Entrance at the eastern side of the building

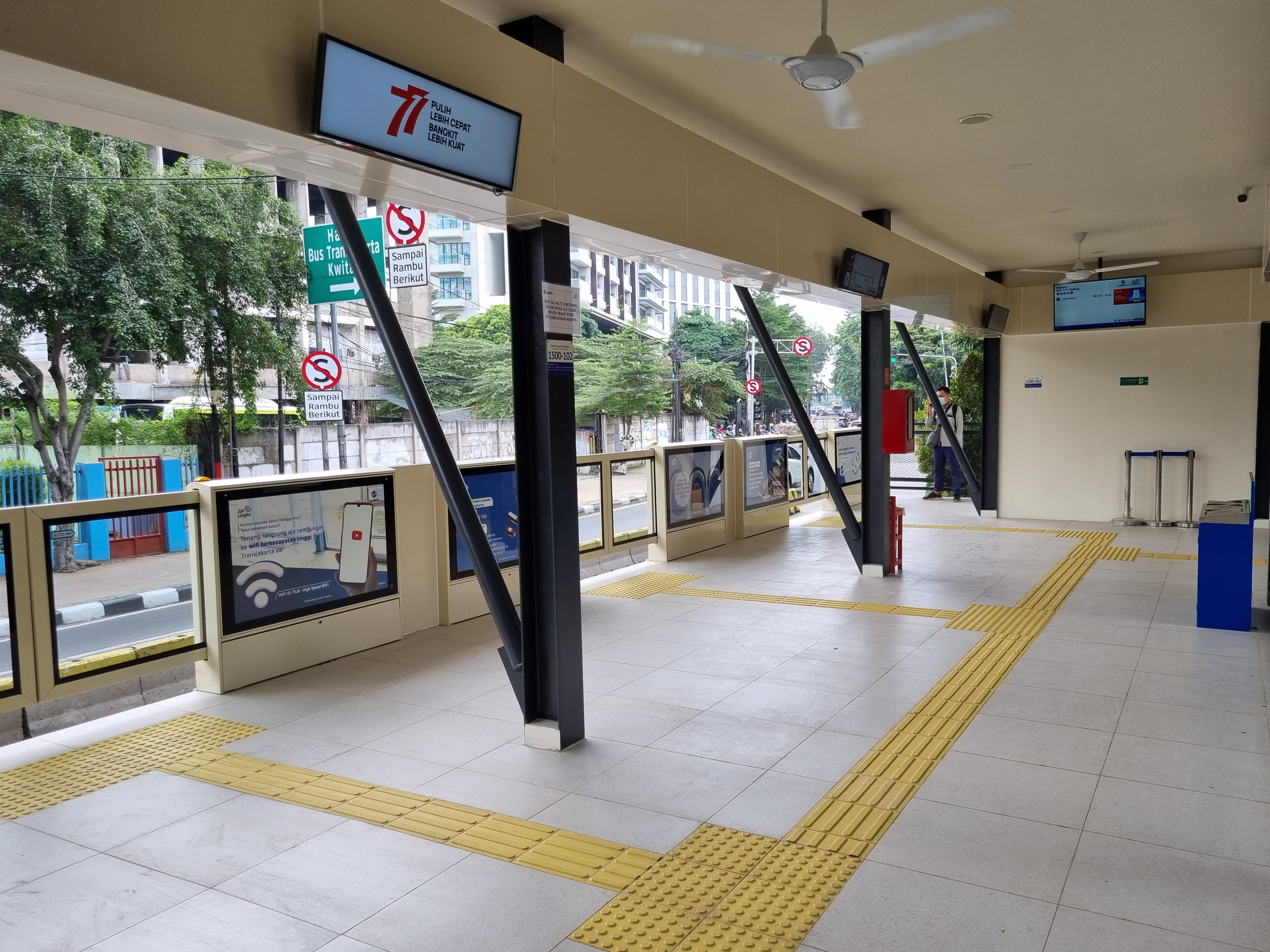
The northern platform for eastbound buses

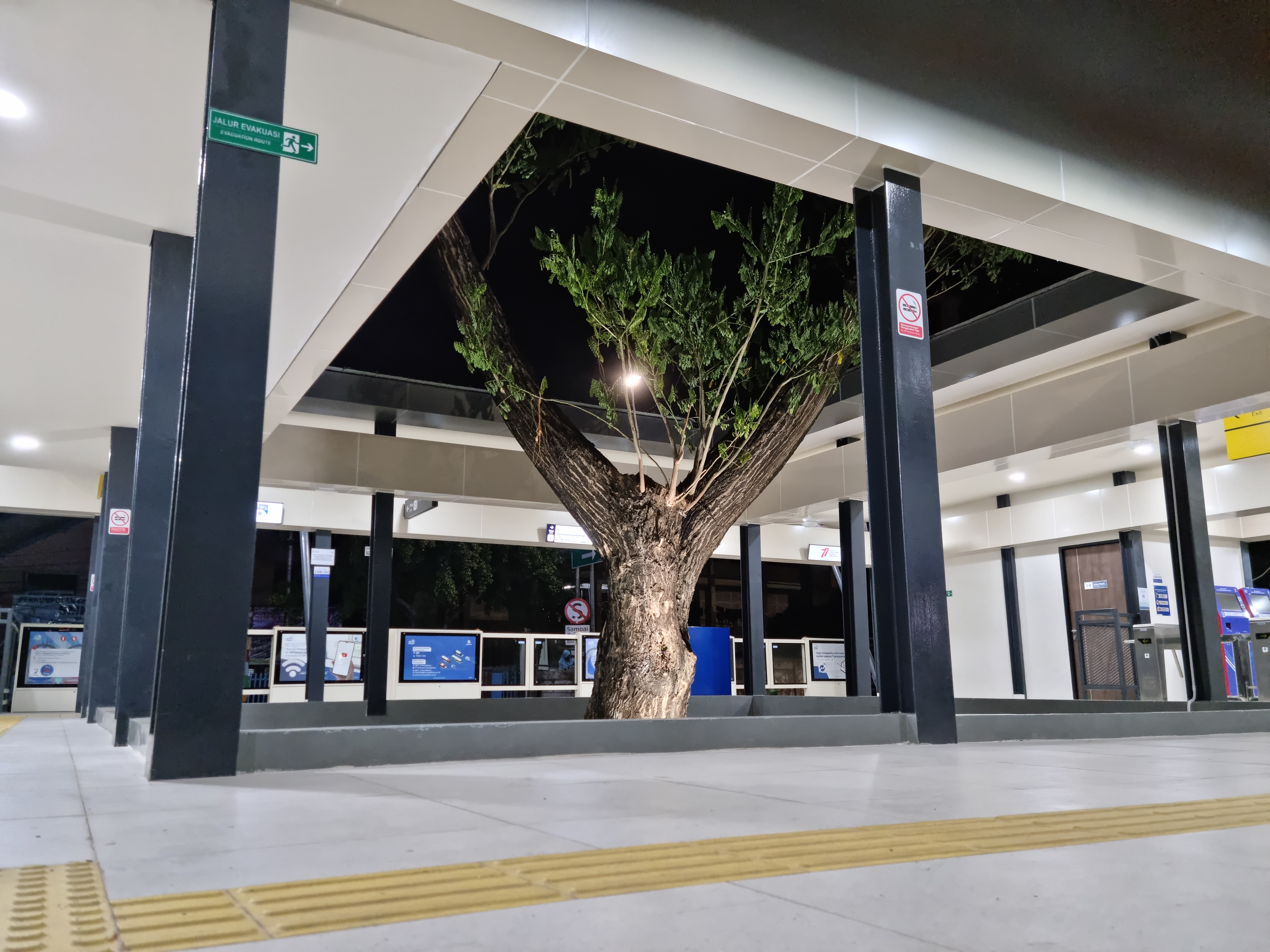
A samanea saman tree inside the station

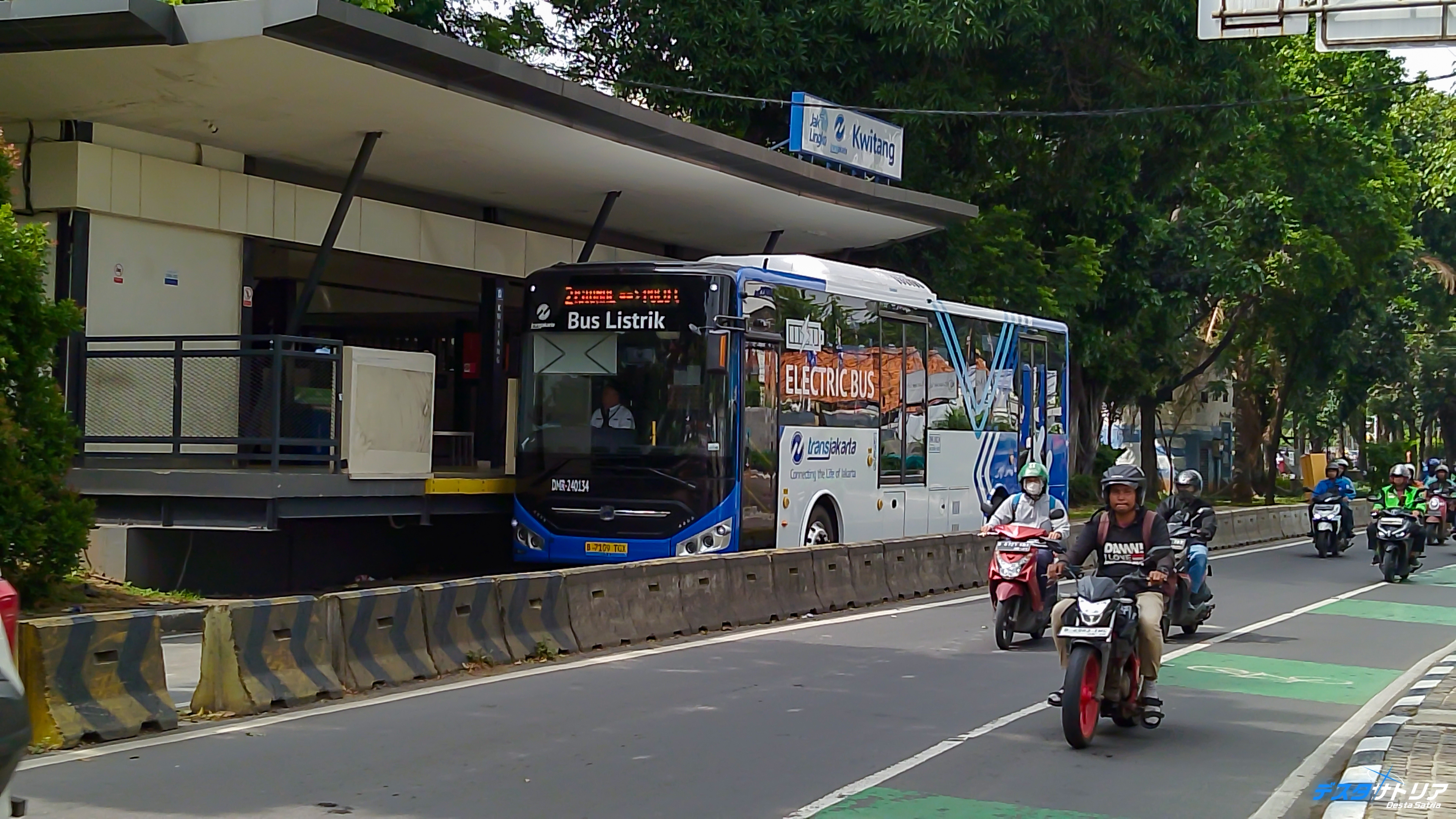
A unit of Zhongtong electric bus fleet of Corridor 2 arriving at Kwitang
