= Jakarta International Stadium (Transjakarta) =

BRT station in Indonesia

14 10 Jakarta International Stadium
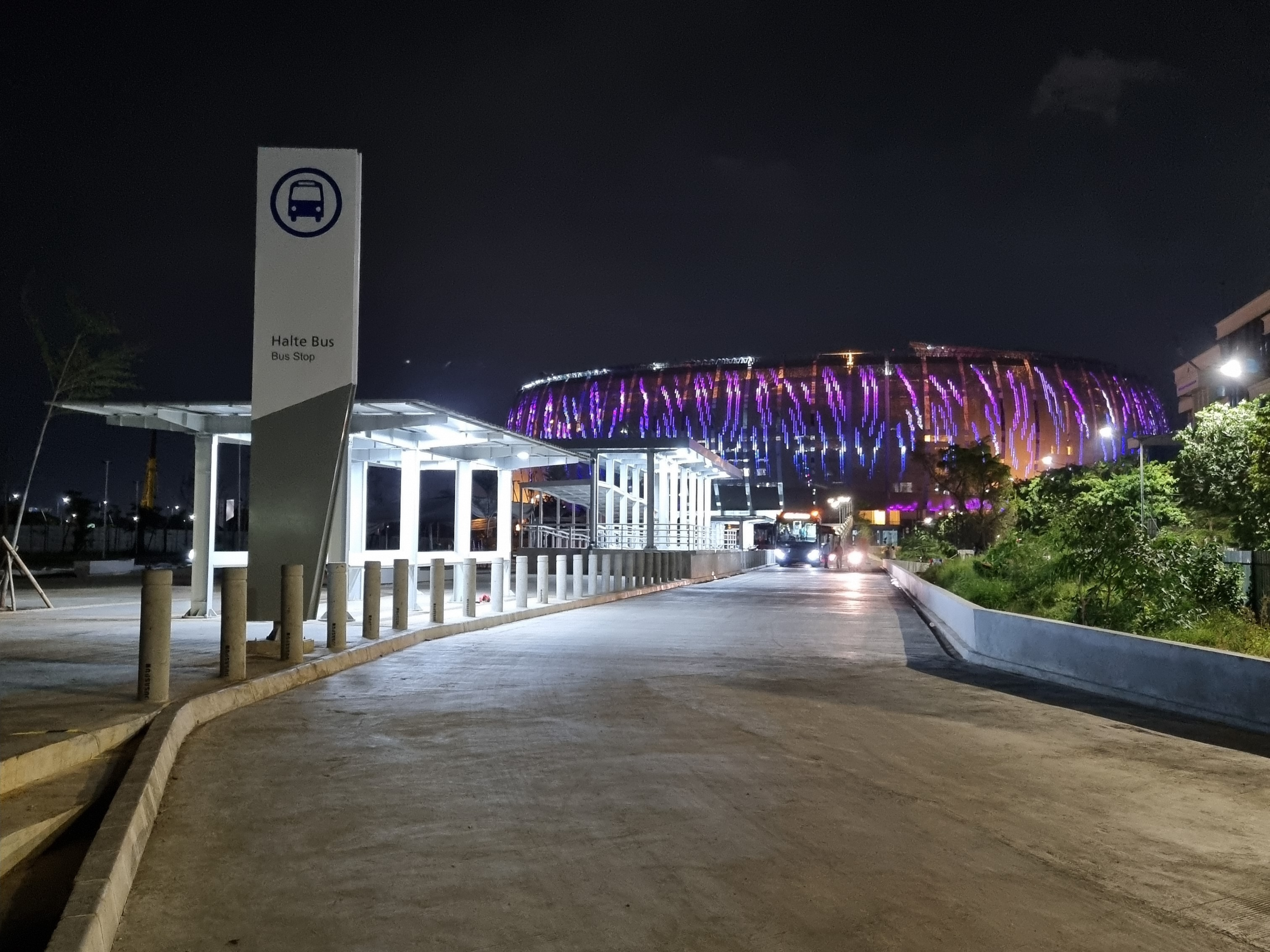
- The station complex at night, with the Jakarta International Stadium on the background

General information
- Location: Danau Sunter Barat Street, Papanggo, Tanjung Priok, North Jakarta 14340, Indonesia
- Coordinates: 6.1267685°S 106.8555526°E
- System: Transjakarta bus rapid transit station
- Owner: Transjakarta
- Operator: Transjakarta
- Lines: List of TransJakarta corridors#Corridor 14
- Platforms: Three side platforms with no paid area
- Connections: Jakarta International Stadium

Construction
- Structure type: At-grade
- Accessible: Yes

Other information
- Status: In service

History
- Opened: 9 December 2021 (as non-BRT shelter); 11 November 2023 (as BRT shelter)

Services
Preceding		Following
Jembatan Item towards Senen Raya	Corridor 14 Terminus	Terminus
Location

Jakarta International Stadium (JIS) is a Transjakarta bus rapid transit station located on Danau Sunter Barat Street, Papanggo, Tanjung Priok, North Jakarta, Indonesia. It is named after the adjacent association football stadium with the same name. The station is the northern terminus of Corridor 14 and is the only BRT station on the BRT system without fare gates and a paid area.

The station and Corridor 14 were designed mainly to serve the stadium. It is situated where the defunct Taman BMW (lit. BMW Park) used to be. JIS BRT station began operations on 9 December 2021, alongside the opening of the JIS3 route from and towards Harmoni (now relabeled as route 14A, and has been extended to Monas).

== Building and layout ==
Upon Corridor 14's launch, there were three shelters used: two low-floor shelters and one high-floor shelter. The high-floor shelter had three bus bays with simple platform barriers. It is the only high-floor BRT platform barrier on the network that is accessible without having to tap a card and enter the paid area.

Since the launch of Corridor 14 as a main BRT corridor, the high-floor platform remains reserved for arrivals only, with alighting at the eastern shelter on the low-floor platform. Passengers tap their card on a portable Tap-on-Bus (TOB) machine available at the shelter. Passengers are not allowed to change direction or board another bus without tapping and paying again.

North
	Side platform, doors open on the left
Inactive shelter	Side platform, doors open on the left	Low-floor platform (eastern side)
South	Arrivals (Note: If there is a crowd during an event at the stadium, the high-floor platform may be used for boarding as well.)	towards Senen Toyota Rangga (Jembatan Item) ↩

== Non-BRT bus services ==
Type	Route	Destination	Notes
Inner city feeder		Jakarta International Stadium—Pegangsaan Dua LRT Station	Inside the station
Inner city feeder		Jakarta International Stadium—Monumen Nasional	Inside the station
Inner city feeder		Tanjung Priok—Senen	Outside the station
Mikrotrans Jak Lingko	JAK 77	Tanjung Priok—Jembatan Item	Outside the station
Mikrotrans Jak Lingko	JAK 88	Tanjung Priok—Ancol Barat	Outside the station
Mikrotrans Jak Lingko	JAK 89	Tanjung Priok—Intan Park	Outside the station
Mikrotrans Jak Lingko	JAK 90	Tanjung Priok—Kemayoran Housing Complex	Outside the station
Mikrotrans Jak Lingko	JAK 118	Kota Tua—Papanggo Lake Park	Outside the station
Mikrotrans Jak Lingko	JAK 120	Jakarta International Stadium—Muara Angke	Outside the station

== Places nearby ==
- Jakarta International Stadium
- North Jakarta District Court
- Prof. dr. Sulianti Saroso Hospital

== Gallery ==
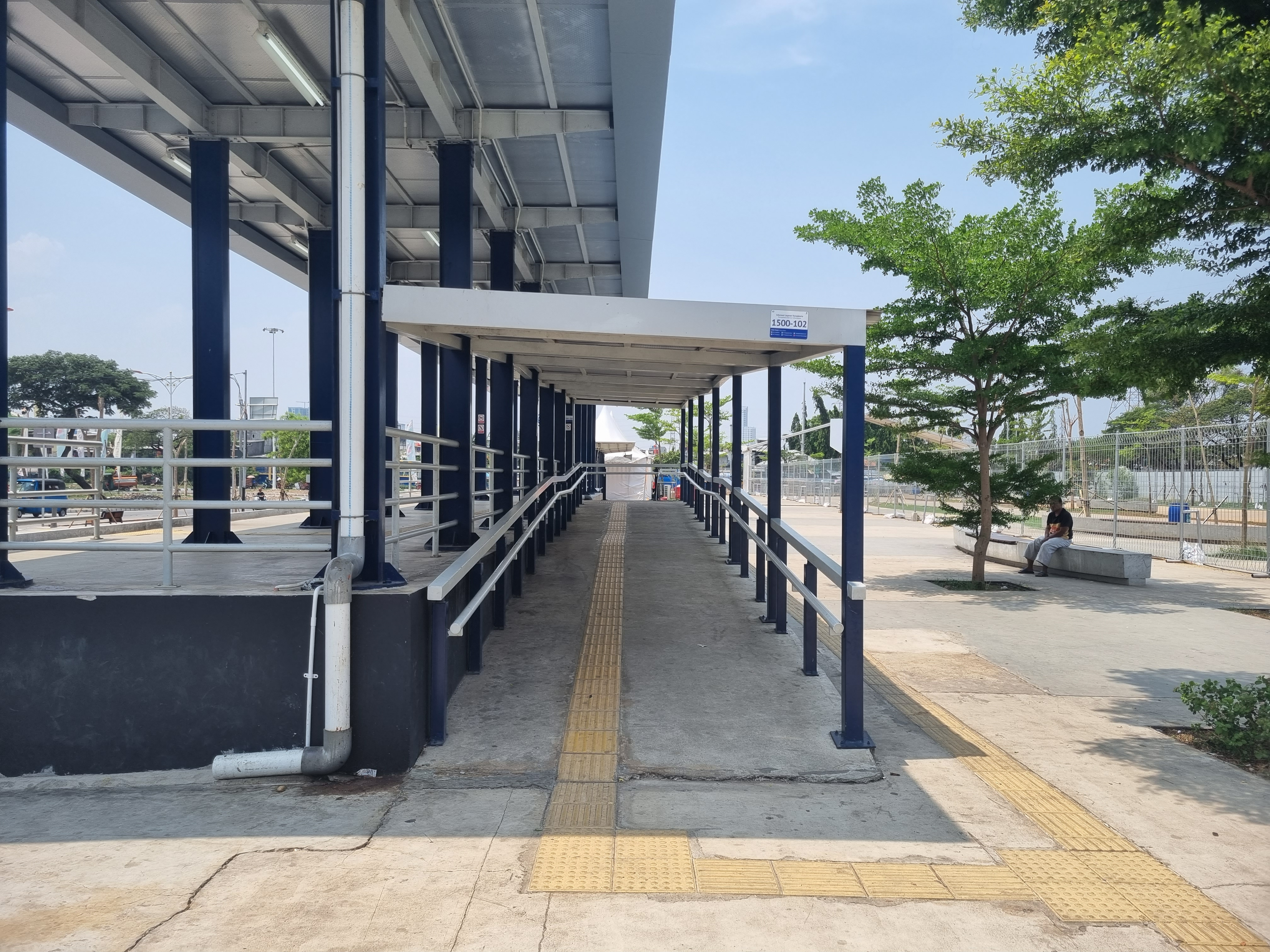
Station access ramp

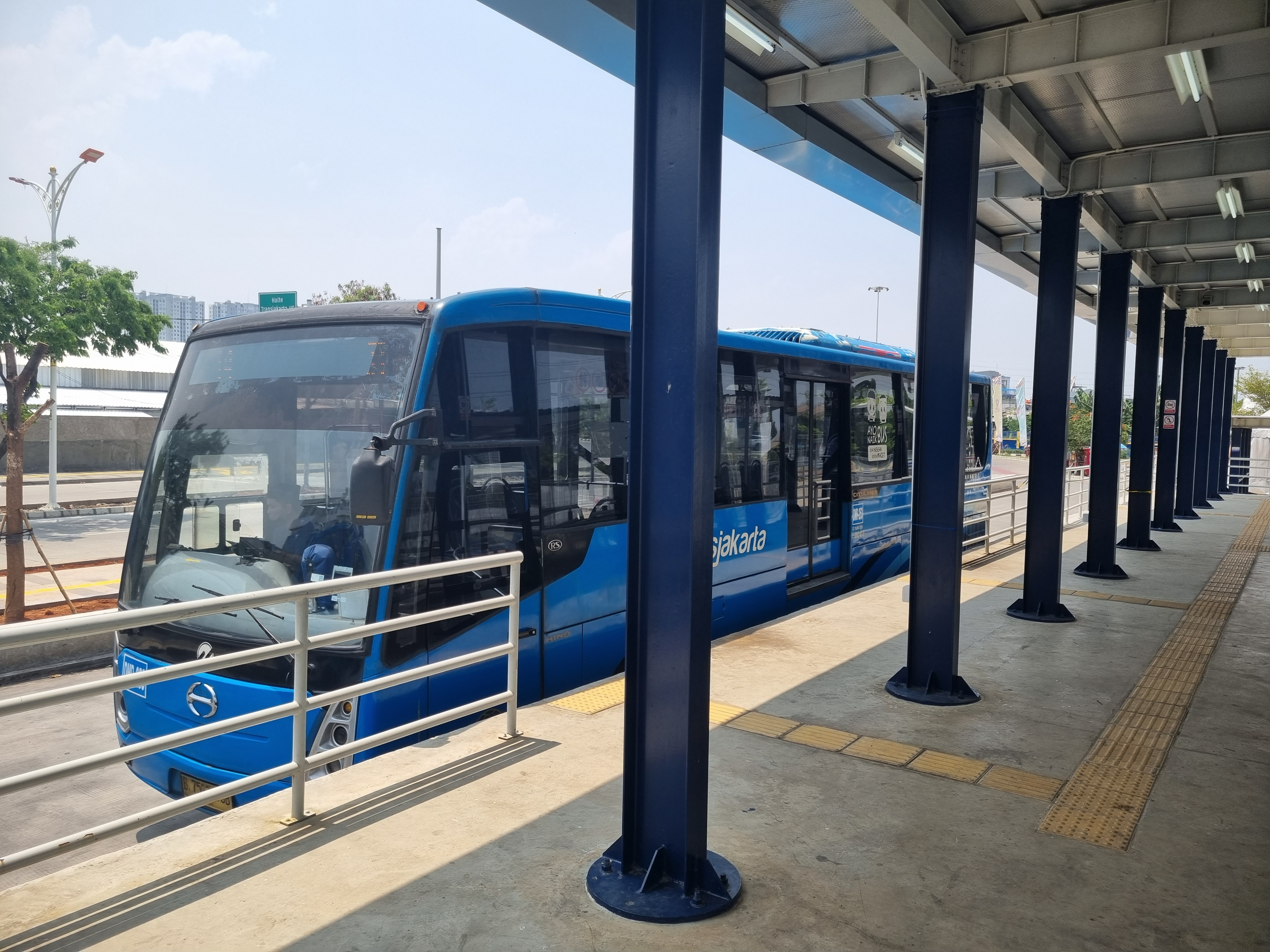
High-floor arrival platform

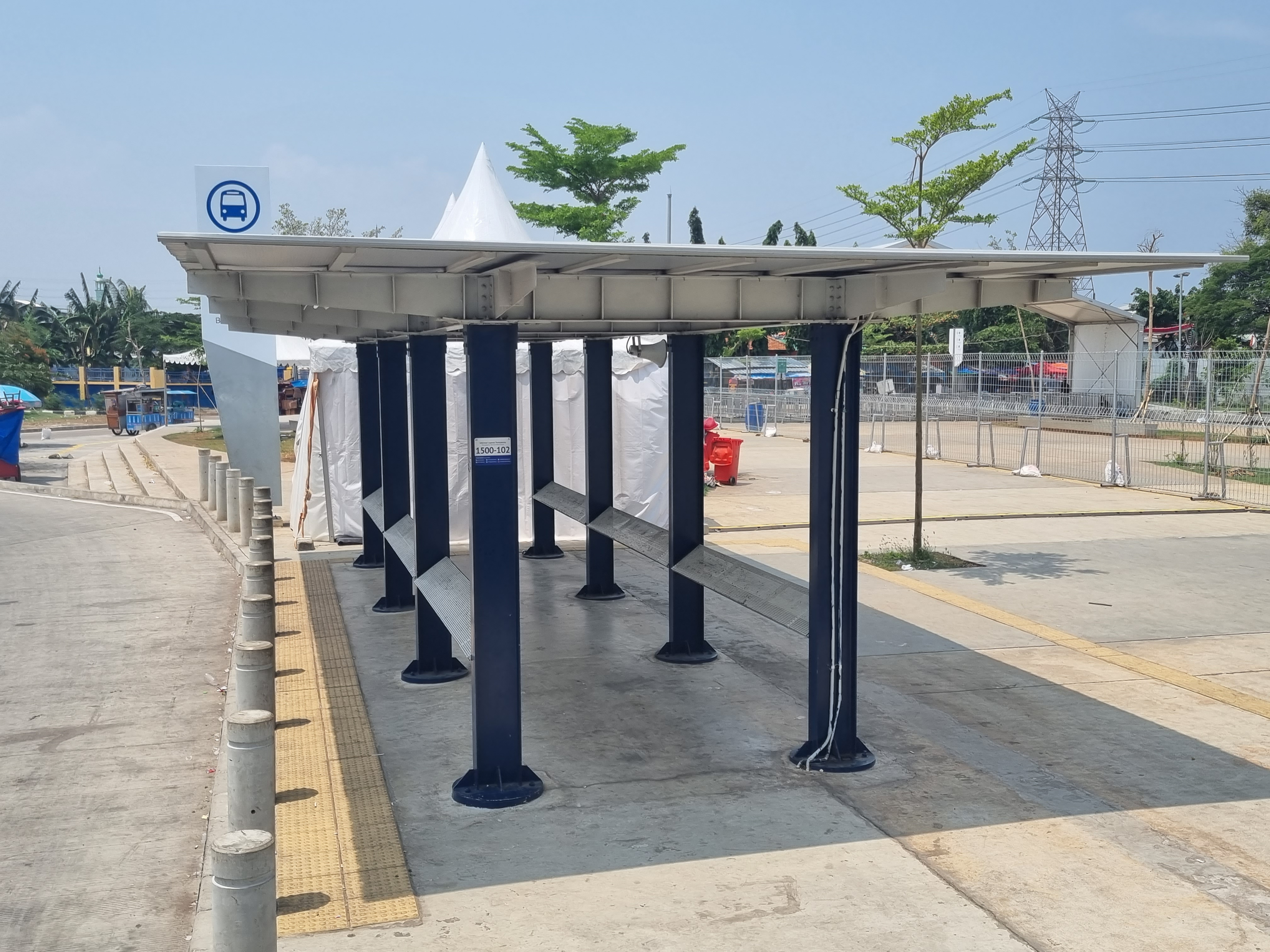
Inactive western shelter

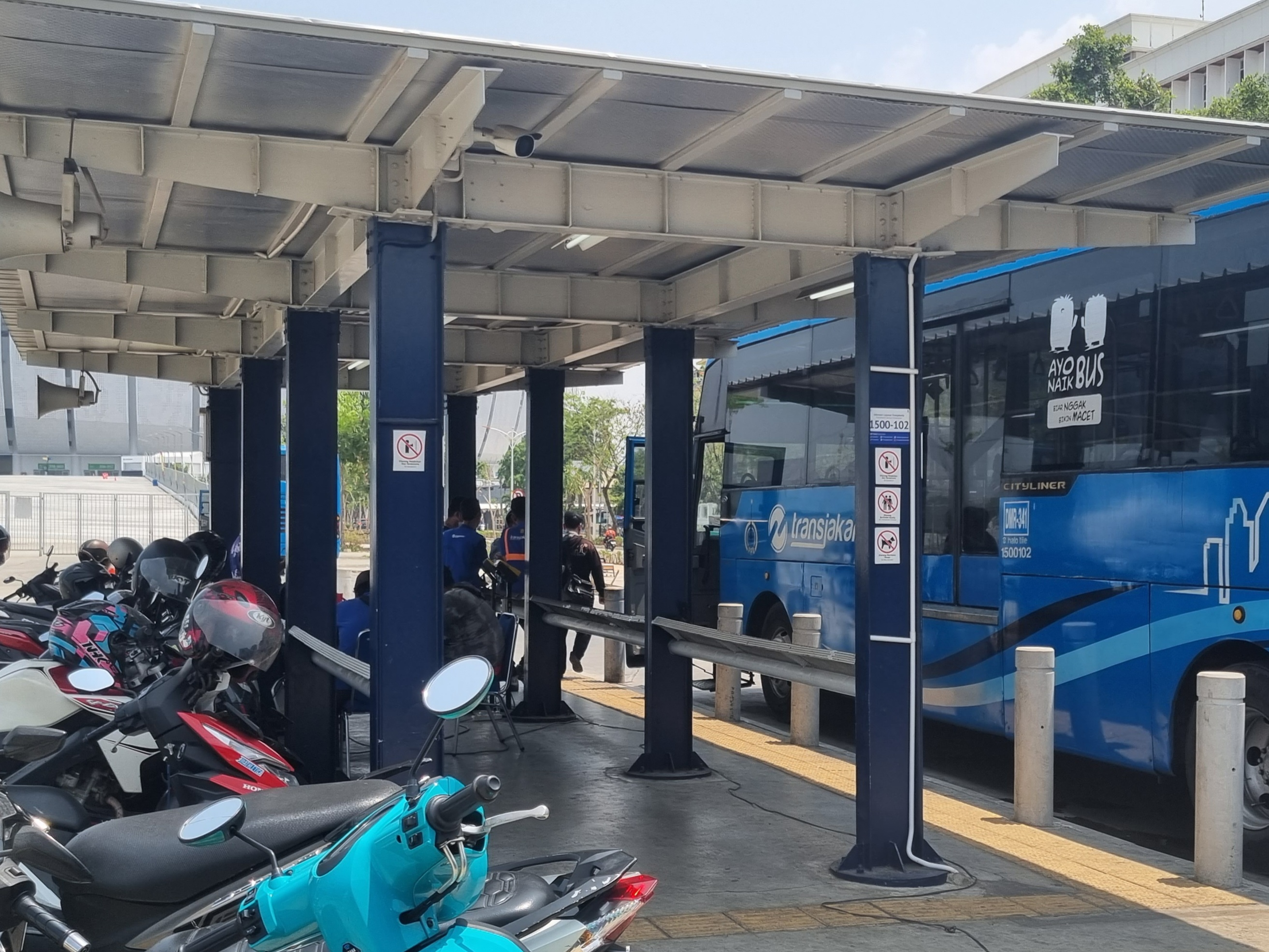
Eastern shelter, used for boarding
