= Transjakarta Corridor 14 =

Bus rapid transit route in Indonesia

- Jakarta International Stadium – Senen Toyota Rangga
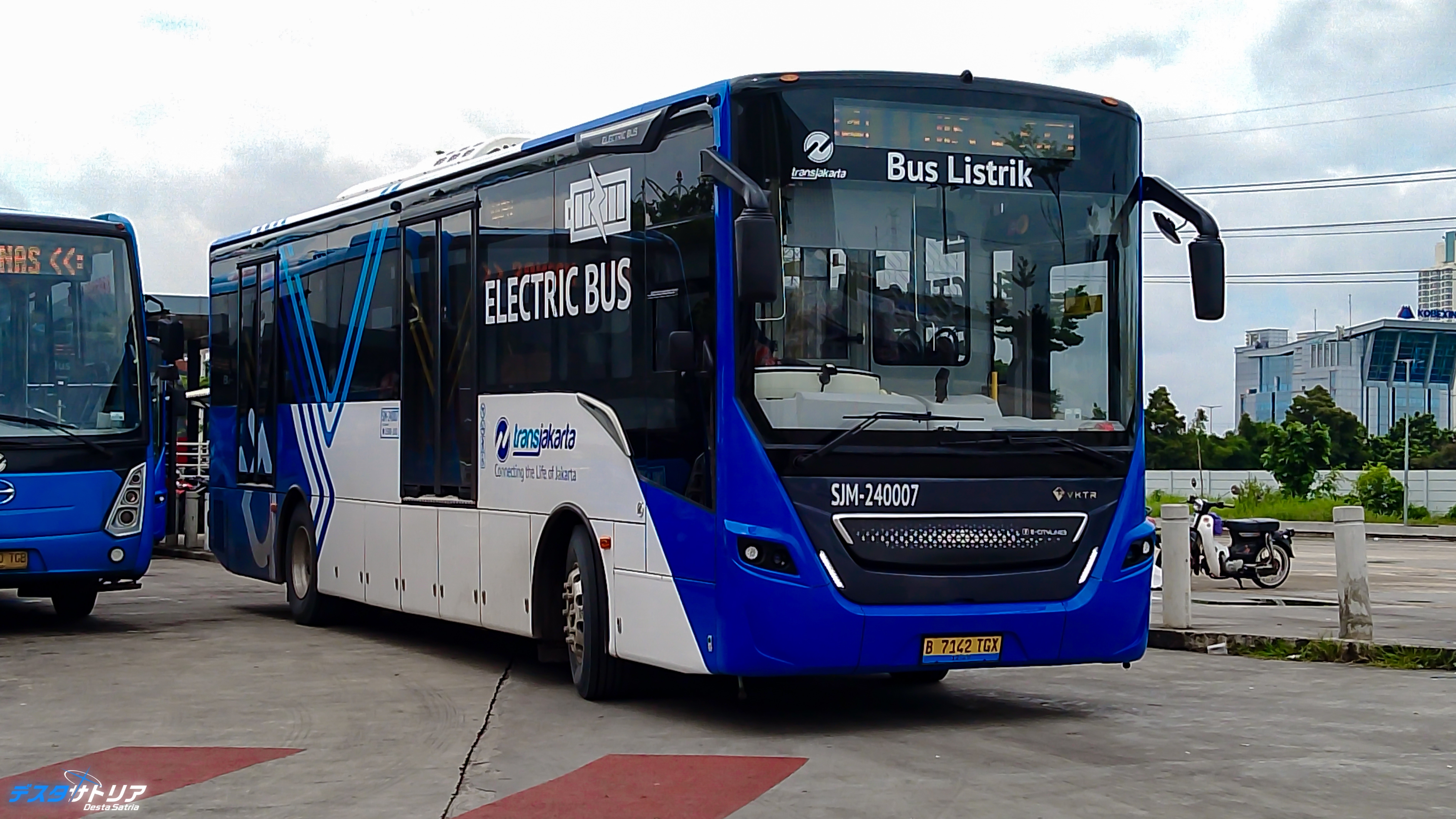
- The BYD electric bus fleet that serves Corridor 14 at the Jakarta International Stadium BRT station

Overview
- System: Transjakarta
- Operator: PT. Transportasi Jakarta (TJ, infrastructures, fleets, drivers and staffs); Sinar Jaya (SJM, fleets and staffs)
- Began service: 11 November 2023

Route
- Route type: Street-level bus rapid transit
- Locale: Central Jakarta; North Jakarta
- Length: 9.7 km
- Stations: 10

Transjakarta Corridor 14 is a bus rapid transit corridor in Jakarta, Indonesia, operated by Transjakarta. It serves the route from the Jakarta International Stadium to the Senen Toyota Rangga BRT station, Senen. The streets that passed by Corridor 14 are along Imam Sapi'ie, Letjen Suprapto, Tanah Tinggi Barat/Timur, Utan Panjang Barat/Timur, Kemayoran Gempol, Benyamin Sueb, HBR Motik, and Danau Sunter Barat streets. Corridor 14 is connected with the Cikarang Loop Line of the KRL Commuterline and inter-city train services at Pasar Senen railway station.

With a length of 9.7 km (6.0 mi) and stopping at 10 stations, Corridor 14 is the shortest Transjakarta BRT corridor with the least number of stations among all the previous ones.

== History ==
=== Initial plan ===
According to the original Transjakarta network plan in 2004, Corridor 14 was initially planned to serve the route from Manggarai to the University of Indonesia, and was also proposed to be built elevated, along with corridors 13 and 15. In February 2019, Transjakarta stated that Corridor 14 would be canceled. It was considered difficult to build an elevated route above the streets on the Manggarai–UI route and the route has already been served by the Bogor Line of the KRL Commuterline (despite corridor 11 line being roughly 80 percent adjacent to the KRL Cikarang Loop Line). It was also announced that the route plan of Corridors 14 and 15 would be changed in the future.

On 28 February 2022, Transjakarta announced the new route plan for Corridor 14, namely from Pasar Senen to the Jakarta International Stadium(JIS). The corridor began its temporary operational as a non-BRT feeder route — using Metrotrans low-floor buses — on the next day. On 11 March, the Jakarta Provincial Government Office of Transportation (Dinas Perhubungan Provinsi DKI Jakarta) unveiled the list of BRT stations of Corridor 14, which consist of four existing stations (Senen Raya (formerly Atrium) and JIEXPO Kemayoran weren't included on the list yet) and four new stations. The Senen–JIS route is chosen to provide public transit access to the newly built Jakarta International Stadium, which was still under construction at the time. Stopping at existing stations from street-level Corridor 2 and 12 also means that Corridor 14 would be built at-grade, and its original plan from Manggarai to UI would be used for Corridor 19.

=== New route: Jakarta International Stadium–Senen ===
On 15 May 2023, Transjakarta stated that the construction of four new BRT stations for Corridor 14 would begin soon. In early September 2023, construction of Sunter Barat A (now Danau Sunter) and Sunter Barat B (now Jembatan Item) BRT stations have been visible, which means the construction of Corridor 14 had begun. It was done to support the preparation of the 2023 FIFA U-17 World Cup at JIS.

On 11 November 2023, Corridor 14 began full operational as a BRT corridor to accommodate spectators of the U-17 World Cup. Only Danau Sunter and Jembatan Item were opened to serve spectators of the tournament, while the two other new stations were still under construction. After the U-17 World Cup concluded, Tanah Tinggi BRT station was opened on 24 December 2023, followed by Kemayoran (initially named Benyamin Sueb) two days later.

Starting from 23 August 2024, the JIEXPO Kemayoran BRT station began to serve corridor 14 buses toward JIS. It was previously an exclusive station for special routes to serve the Jakarta Fair.

== List of BRT stations ==
- All stations are served by buses 24 hours a day.
- Stations indicated by a ← sign have a one-way service towards Jakarta International Stadium. Stations indicated by a → sign have a one-way service towards Senen Toyota Rangga only.

Corridor 14 (Jakarta International Stadium – Senen Toyota Rangga)
Code	Station name	Transfer/Notes	Bus terminal and train station nearby
Stations in order: From top to bottom (downwards) towards Senen Toyota Rangga (→); from bottom to top (upwards) towards Jakarta International Stadium (←)
14 10	Jakarta International Stadium	Two separate buildings for opposing directions require exiting paid area to transfer: Eastbound: Towards Senen Toyota Rangga (→); In-between: Arrivals only	Jakarta International Stadium JIS (planned)
14 09	Jembatan Item		
14 08 12 13	Danau Sunter	Danau Sunter	
14 07 12 12	Danau Agung	Danau Agung	
14 06 12 11	Landasan Pacu	Landasan Pacu	
Towards Senen Toyota Rangga (→) heads straight to Kemayoran
14 05	JIEXPO Kemayoran ←		Benyamin Sueb (planned)
14 04	Kemayoran		
14 03	Tanah Tinggi		
14 01 2 12	Senen Toyota Rangga	Some buses terminate here and require all passengers to alight	Senen (planned) Pasar Senen Senen Bus Terminal
14 01 2 12	Senen Toyota Rangga	Senen Toyota Rangga; Jaga Jakarta (via skybridge)	Senen (planned) Pasar Senen Senen Bus Terminal
14 02 2 13	Senen Raya	Senen Raya	

== Fleets ==
Information correct as of January 2025

- Transjakarta (self-managed) (TJ):
  - Hino RK1 JSNL CNG, white-blue
  - Mercedes-Benz OH 1526, white-light blue (night bus (22:00 - 05:00))
- Sinar Jaya (SJM):
  - BYD D9 e-bus, white-blue

== Depots ==
- Transjakarta (TJ):
  - Kedaung Kali Angke
  - Cawang (night bus)
- Sinar Jaya (SJM):
  - Cakung

== See also ==
- Transjakarta
  - List of Transjakarta corridors
