= Senen, Senen =

Senen
- Administrative village
- Location within Jakarta Location within Indonesia
- Coordinates: 6°10′36″S 106°50′22″E
- Country: Indonesia
- Province: DKI Jakarta
- Administrative city: Central Jakarta
- District: Senen
- Postal code: 10410

Senen is an administrative village in the Senen district of Indonesia. It has postal code of 10410.

== See also ==
- Senen
- List of administrative villages of Jakarta
