= Grogol (Transjakarta) =

Bus rapid transit station in Jakarta, Indonesia

3 11 Grogol
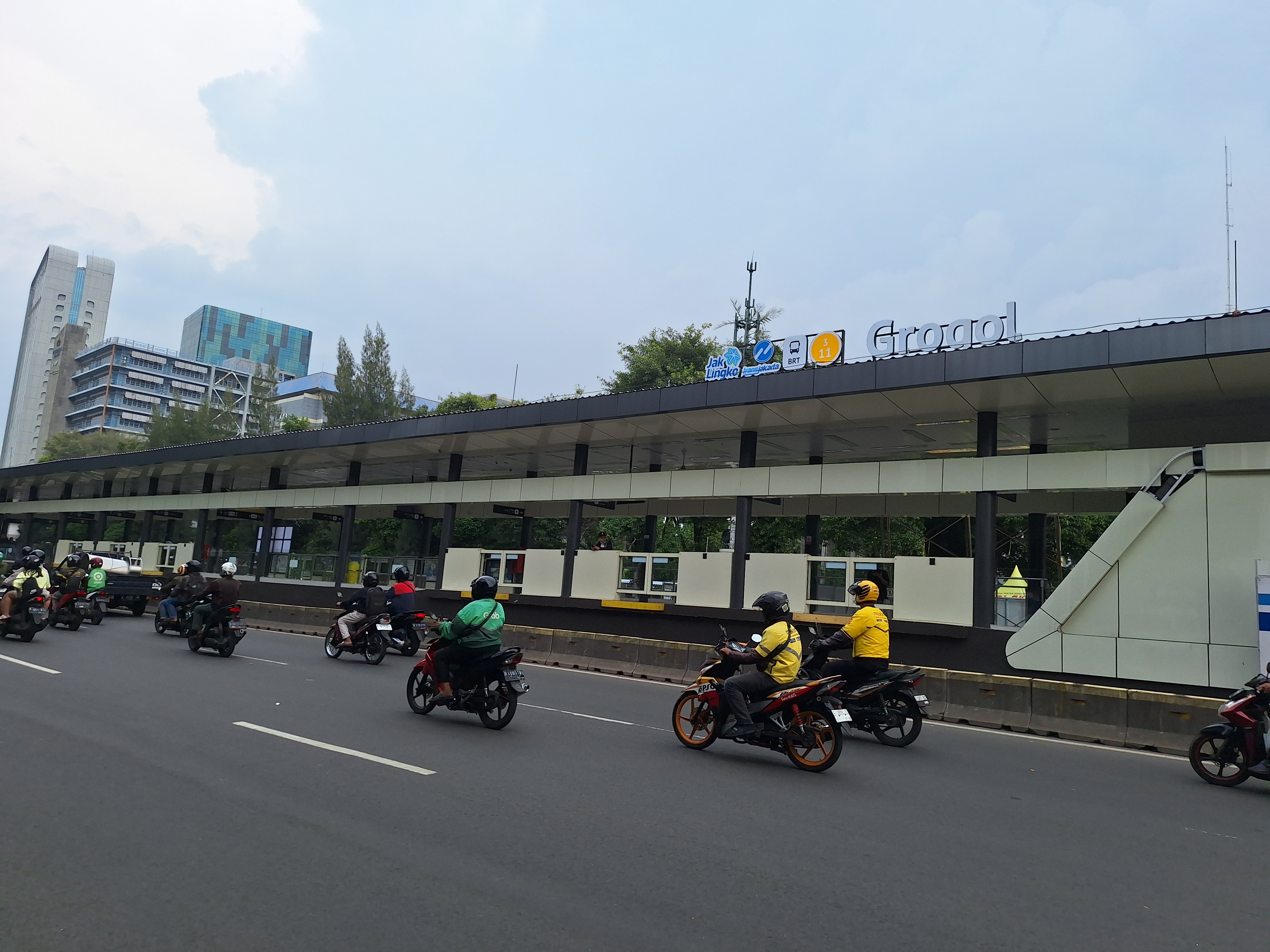

General information
- Location: Kyai Tapa Street, Grogol, Grogol Petamburan, West Jakarta 11450, Jakarta, Indonesia
- Coordinates: 6.166620°S 106.790320°E
- System: Transjakarta bus rapid transit station
- Owner: Transjakarta
- Operator: Transjakarta
- Lines: List of Transjakarta corridors#Cross-corridor routes List of Transjakarta corridors#Corridor 3 List of TransJakarta corridors#Corridor 8
- Platforms: Single island platform
- Connections: Grogol Reformasi

Construction
- Structure type: At-grade

Other information
- Status: In service

History
- Opened: 10 September 2008
- Rebuilt: 4 November 2023
- Former names: Grogol 1 Grogol 1: 12 Mei Reformasi

Services
Preceding		Following
Roxy towards Pulo Gadung	Corridor 2 Route 2A	Jelambar towards Rawa Buaya
Jelambar towards Kalideres	Corridor 3	Roxy towards Monumen Nasional
Jelambar towards Damai	Corridor 3 Route 3H	Roxy towards Kota
Jelambar towards Lebak Bulus	Corridor 8 via Cideng	Roxy towards Pasar Baru
Jelambar Terminus	Corridor 8 Route 8A Sunday morning only	Roxy towards Pasar Baru
Jelambar One-way operation	Corridor 3 Route 3F transfer at Grogol Reformasi	Tanjung Duren towards Senayan Bank Jakarta
Jelambar One-way operation	Corridor 8 via Tomang transfer at Grogol Reformasi	Tanjung Duren towards Pasar Baru
Tanjung Duren towards Pinang Ranti	Corridor 9 transfer at Grogol Reformasi	Kali Grogol towards Pluit
Tanjung Duren towards Cililitan	Corridor 9 Route 9A transfer at Grogol Reformasi	Terminus
Location

Grogol is a Transjakarta bus rapid transit station located on Kyai Tapa Street, Grogol, Grogol Petamburan, West Jakarta, serving Corridor 3. The station is located opposite Grogol Bus Terminal and is connected by a paid transfer skybridge to Grogol Reformasi station that serves Corridors 8 and 9.

== History ==
Alongside Roxy, Grogol 1 BRT station was a late addition to Corridor 3, opened on 10 September 2008, two years after the corridor's opening. Before the station was built, eastbound Corridor 3 buses departing from Jelambar turned right towards S. Parman street and then turn left to Tomang Raya street, where Corridors 8 and 9 today run.

On 10 November 2013, the station was renamed Grogol 1: 12 Mei Reformasi (lit. Grogol 1: 12th May Reformation) to commemorate the Trisakti shootings on 12 May 1998 that triggered the Fall of New Order. The station, however, continued to be mentioned officially as simply Grogol 1.

On 3 June 2023, the two Grogol stations (Grogol 1 and Grogol 2) were closed for revitalisation works, alongside Pulo Mas and Pasar Rumput stations. Passengers were advised to use the neighboring Jelambar station. On 4 November 2023, the station reopened, although its Corridor 9 counterpart, Grogol 2, was still under construction. The station was renamed as simply Grogol, while Corridor 9's station was renamed Grogol Reformasi as a shortened version of the "12 Mei Reformasi" phrase.

== Building and layout ==
The station was originally medium-sized, with three bus bays on each side and a ramp to access the transfer linkway to Grogol Reformasi. After revitalisation works, the station features six bus bays on each side and has disabled-friendly toilets and lifts to access the transfer linkway.

North	towards Pulo Gadung and towards Kota		towards Monumen Nasional	(Roxy) →
Island platform, doors open on the right
South	← (Jelambar)	towards Kalideres and towardsDamai	towards Rawa Buaya

== Non-BRT bus services ==
The following non-BRT bus services stop around Grogol station, last updated on 27 July 2024:

Type	Route	Destination	Notes
Inner city feeder		Meruya Ilir—Jelambar	Inside the station
Inner city feeder		Tanah Abang Station—Tanjung Duren	Outside the station
Mikrotrans Jak Lingko	JAK 04	Grogol—Angke	Inside Grogol 1 Bus Terminal
Mikrotrans Jak Lingko	JAK 07	Grogol—Tanah Abang Station via Tawakal Street	Inside Grogol 2 Bus Terminal
Mikrotrans Jak Lingko	JAK 13	Tanah Abang Station—Kota Intan Bus Terminal via Jembatan Lima Street	Inside Grogol 2 Bus Terminal
Mikrotrans Jak Lingko	JAK 30	Grogol—Meruya Selatan via Kyai Tapa Street	Outside the station
Mikrotrans Jak Lingko	JAK 53	Grogol—Kelapa Dua via S. Parman Street	Outside the station
Mikrotrans Jak Lingko	JAK 54	Grogol—Bendungan Hilir	Inside Grogol 1 Bus Terminal
Mikrotrans Jak Lingko	JAK 56	Grogol—Srengseng	Outside the station

== Places nearby ==
- Mal Ciputra Jakarta
- 12th May Reformation Garden
- Trisakti University

== Incidents ==
On 23 August 2024, a container truck hit the paid transfer skybridge connecting Grogol and Grogol Reformasi stations and was stuck beneath the skybridge. The skybridge suffered significant damage from the incident. The skybridge was closed for 10 days and reopened on 2 September 2024.
