= Tanjung Duren (Transjakarta) =

Bus rapid transit station in Jakarta, Indonesia

8 20 9 19 Tanjung Duren
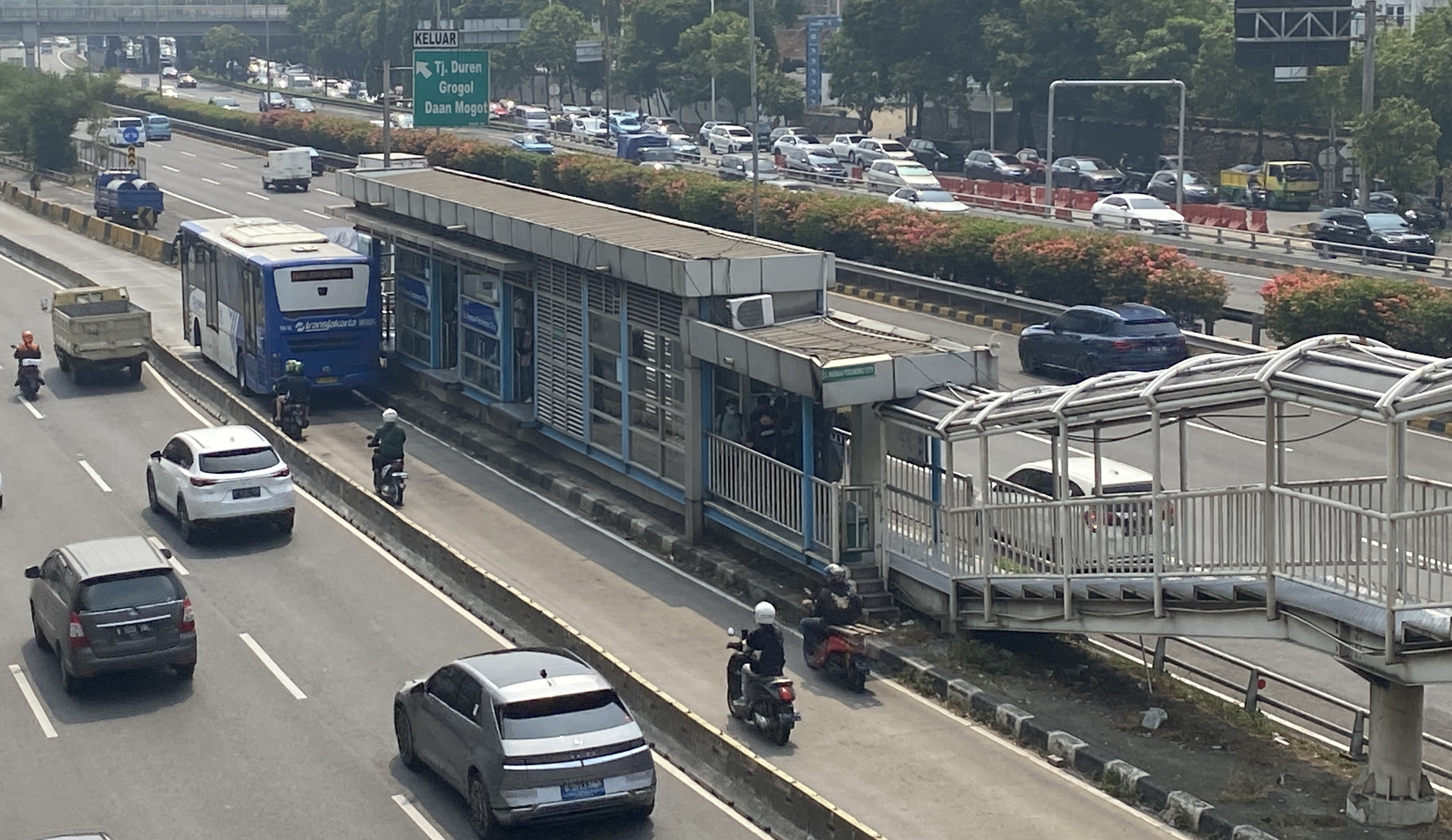
- View of the west building from the access bridge, 2023

General information
- Location: Letjen S. Parman St., Tanjung Duren Selatan, Grogol Petamburan, West Jakarta, Jakarta, Indonesia
- Coordinates: 6.1763°S 106.7929°E
- System: Transjakarta
- Owner: Transjakarta
- Operator: Transjakarta
- Lines: List of Transjakarta corridors#Cross-corridor routes List of TransJakarta corridors#Corridor 8 List of TransJakarta corridors#Corridor 9 List of TransJakarta corridors#Cross-corridor routes
- Platforms: Two side platforms

Construction
- Structure type: At-grade
- Cycle facilities: No
- Accessible: No

History
- Opened: 21 February 2009
- Former names: S. Parman Podomoro City

Services
Preceding		Following
Grogol Reformasi One-way operation	Corridor 3 Route 3F	Kota Bambu towards Senayan Bank Jakarta
Jelambar towards Kalideres	Corridor 3 Route 3F	Kota Bambu One-way operation
Grogol Reformasi One-way operation	Corridor 8 via Tomang	Tomang Raya towards Pasar Baru
Jelambar towards Lebak Bulus	Corridor 8 via Tomang	Tomang Raya One-way operation
Kota Bambu towards Pinang Ranti	Corridor 9	Grogol Reformasi towards Pluit
Kota Bambu towards Cililitan	Corridor 9 Route 9A	Grogol Reformasi Terminus
Location

Tanjung Duren is a Transjakarta bus rapid transit station at Letjen S. Parman street in Tanjung Duren Selatan, Grogol Petamburan, West Jakarta, Indonesia, serving corridors 8 and 9. It is connected to the Central Park Jakarta shopping mall within the Podomoro City superblock at west.

== History ==
Tanjung Duren BRT station was originally named S. Parman Podomoro City, where "S. Parman" came from the street where it is located, taken after Lt. Gen Siswondo Parman (1918-1965), and the name "Podomoro City" was given because of its adjacent location with the superblock of the same name. The BRT station commenced operations alongside the opening of Corridor 8 on 21 February 2009. On 31 December 2010, the inauguration ceremony of corridors 9 and 10 took place here.

Until 2023, S. Parman Podomoro City BRT station was not served by the main Corridor 8 service, but instead by its supplementary service route 8A (Grogol 2–Juanda). This is because the main Corridor 8 ran straight through Kyai Tapa and K.H. Hasyim Ashari Streets after Jelambar station until it terminate at Harmoni central station, which follows Corridor 3. On 4 March 2023, Harmoni BRT station was closed and replaced by a pair of small-sized temporary buildings, due to the construction of the Jakarta MRT North–South Line extension. As the result, Corridor 8 is currently being extended to Pasar Baru station, and is modified to trace and take over all stations served by route 8A: Grogol 2 (now Grogol Reformasi), S. Parman Podomoro City, Tomang Mandala (now Tomang Raya), RS Tarakan (now Tarakan), Petojo, Pecenongan and Juanda stations. Since then, route 8A was closed and merged with the modified main Corridor 8 service.

In early January 2024, S. Parman Podomoro City station was renamed into Tanjung Duren. It was part of Transjakarta's mass "neutralization" of its station names from trivial usage of copyrighted third-party names; in this case, "S. Parman" as a historical figure and "Podomoro City" as a real estate project developed by Agung Podomoro Land.

To meet the demands of addressing overcrowding issue, an extension work was carried out, but only for the station's east building for southbound buses only. On 30 November 2025, the extension area of the east building was opened to the public.

== Building and layout ==
Like most station on Corridor 9, Tanjung Duren BRT station consists of two separated buildings sandwiching the Jakarta Inner Ring Road: the west building for northbound buses towards Pluit and the east building for southbound buses towards Pinang Ranti. As there is no separated area in the access bridge, passengers have to pay again for changing directions. Both buildings are considered to be narrow and couldn't able to accommodate passenger crowding. To relieve this, the east building was extended with extra platform bays.

East	to Senayan Bank Jakarta, to Pasar Baru, to Pinang Ranti, and to Cililitan (Tomang Raya/Kota Bambu) →
	Side platform, the doors are opened on the right side of the bus travel
	Jakarta Inner Ring Road →	(to Tomang/Cawang) →
← (to Pluit)	← Jakarta Inner Ring Road
	Side platform, the doors are opened on the right side of the bus travel
West	← (Jelambar/Grogol Reformasi) to Kalideres, to Lebak Bulus, to Pluit, and to Grogol Reformasi

== Non-BRT bus services ==
Service type	Route	Destination	Notes
Inner city feeder		Cibubur → Pluit	Inside the station
Inner city feeder		Batusari–Grogol	Outside the station
Inner city feeder		Tanjung Duren–Tanah Abang	Inside the station
Inner city feeder		Jelambar–Kebayoran	Inside the station
Cross-border feeder (Transjabodetabek)		BSD City–Jelambar	Outside the station
Mikrotrans Jak Lingko	JAK-53	Pos Pengumben–Grogol via Slipi	Outside the station

== Nearby places ==
- Podomoro City
  - Central Park Jakarta
- Mall Taman Anggrek

== Gallery ==
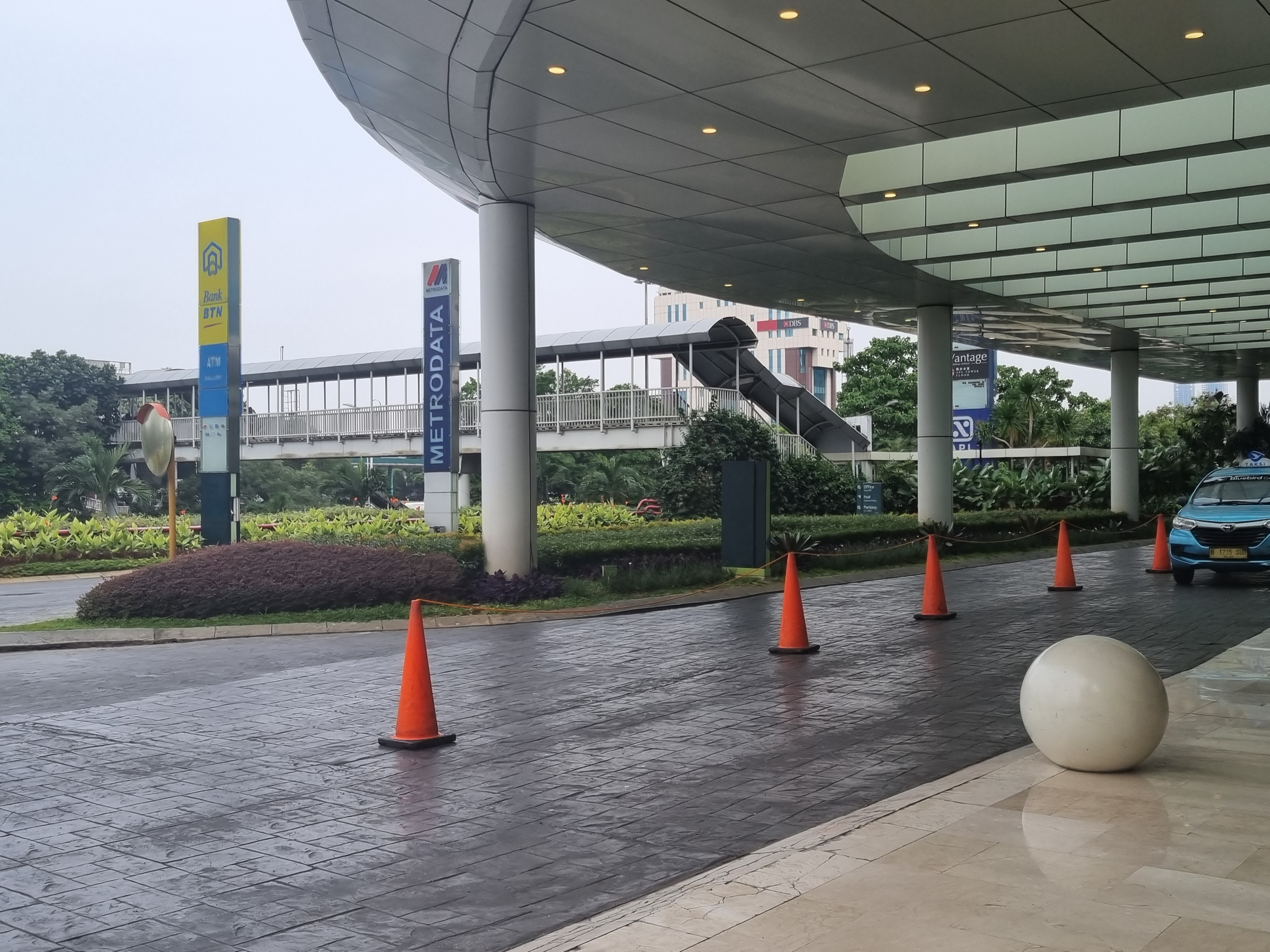
The access bridge seen from Central Park Jakarta west lobby. It is connected to the lobby via pedestrian entrance ramp.

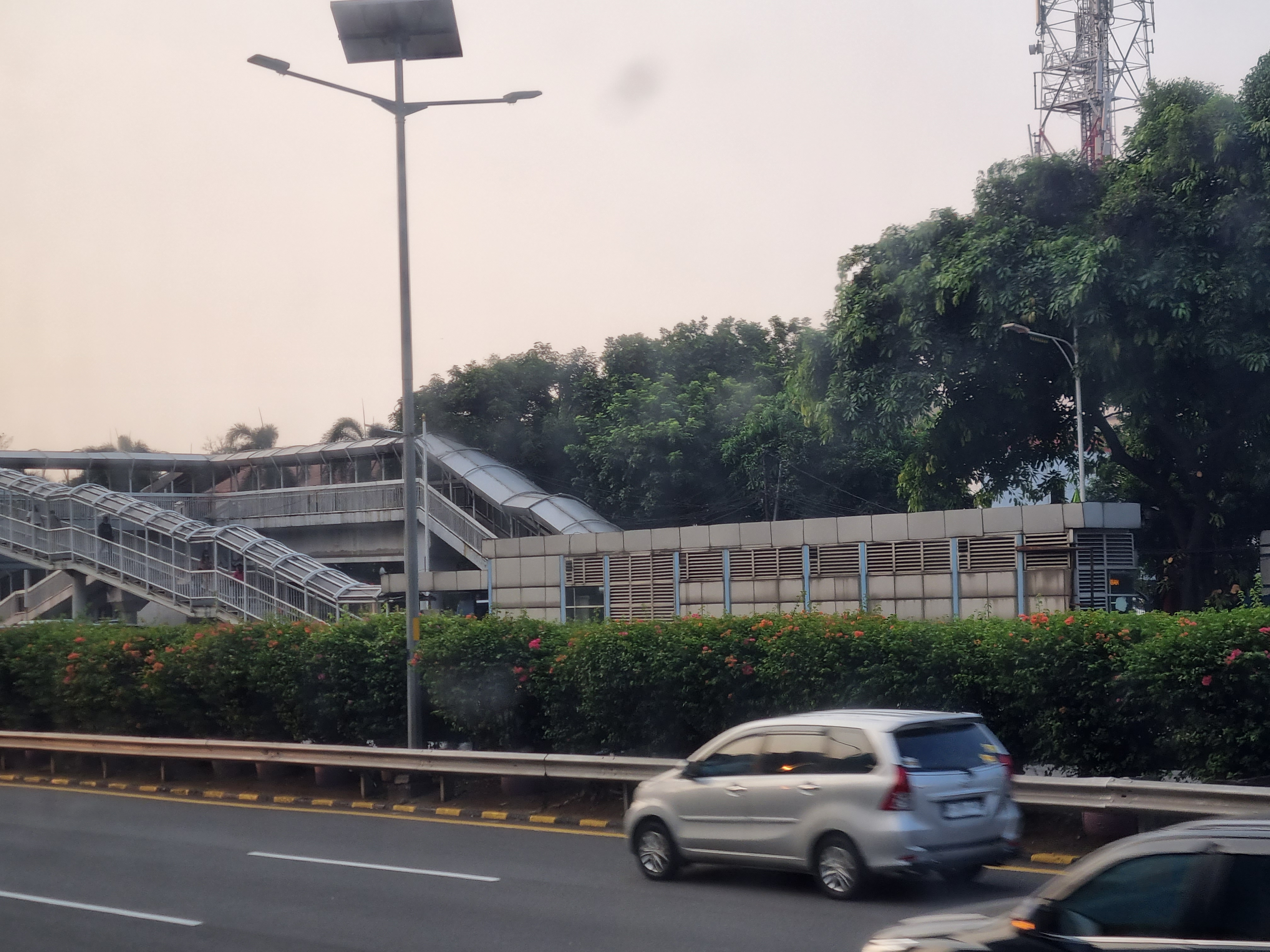
The east building for southbound buses seen in 2023, prior to the extension work

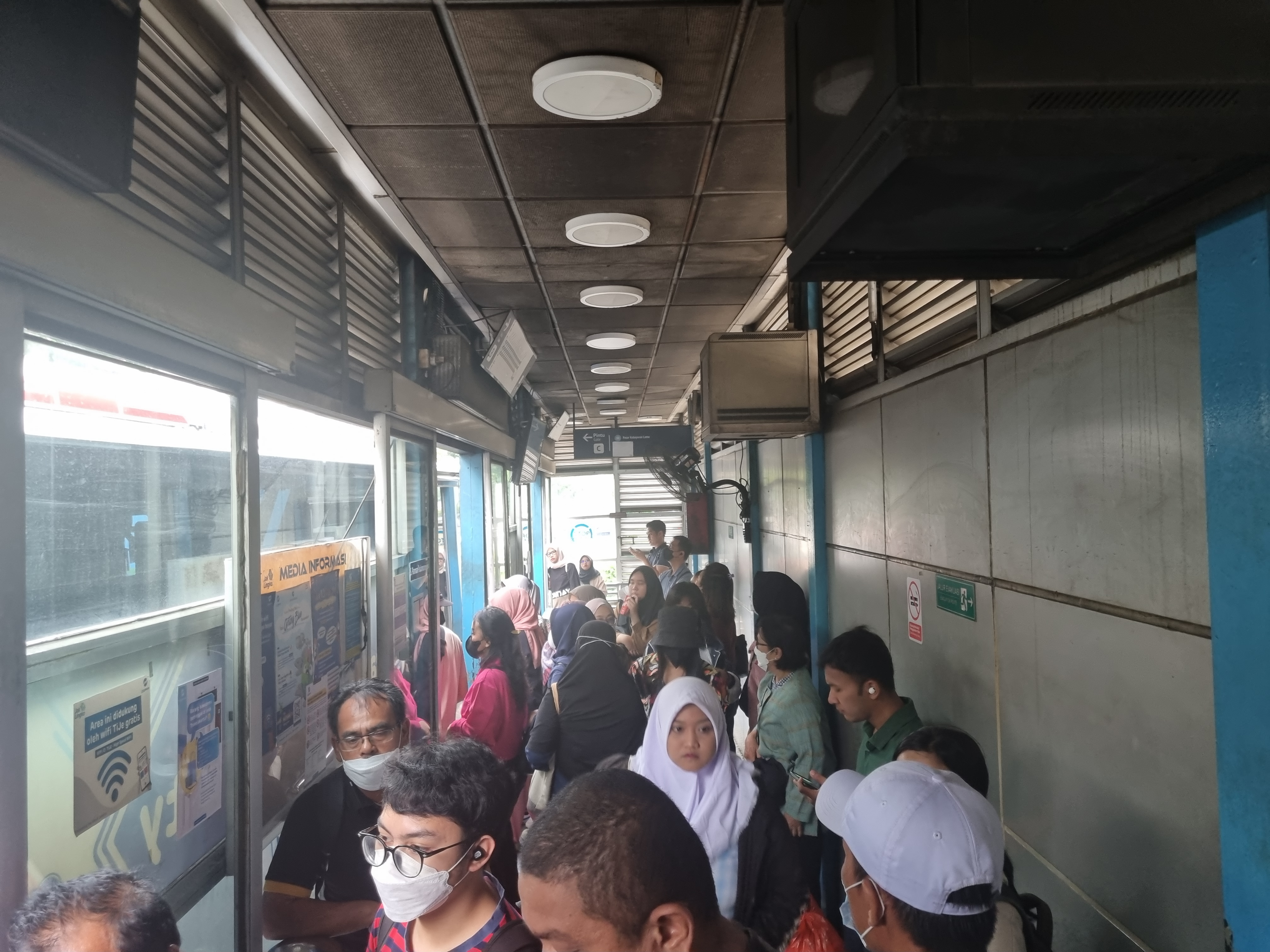
Inside the east building of the station prior to the extension work
