= Grogol Reformasi (Transjakarta) =

Bus rapid transit station in Jakarta, Indonesia

8 19 9 20 Grogol Reformasi
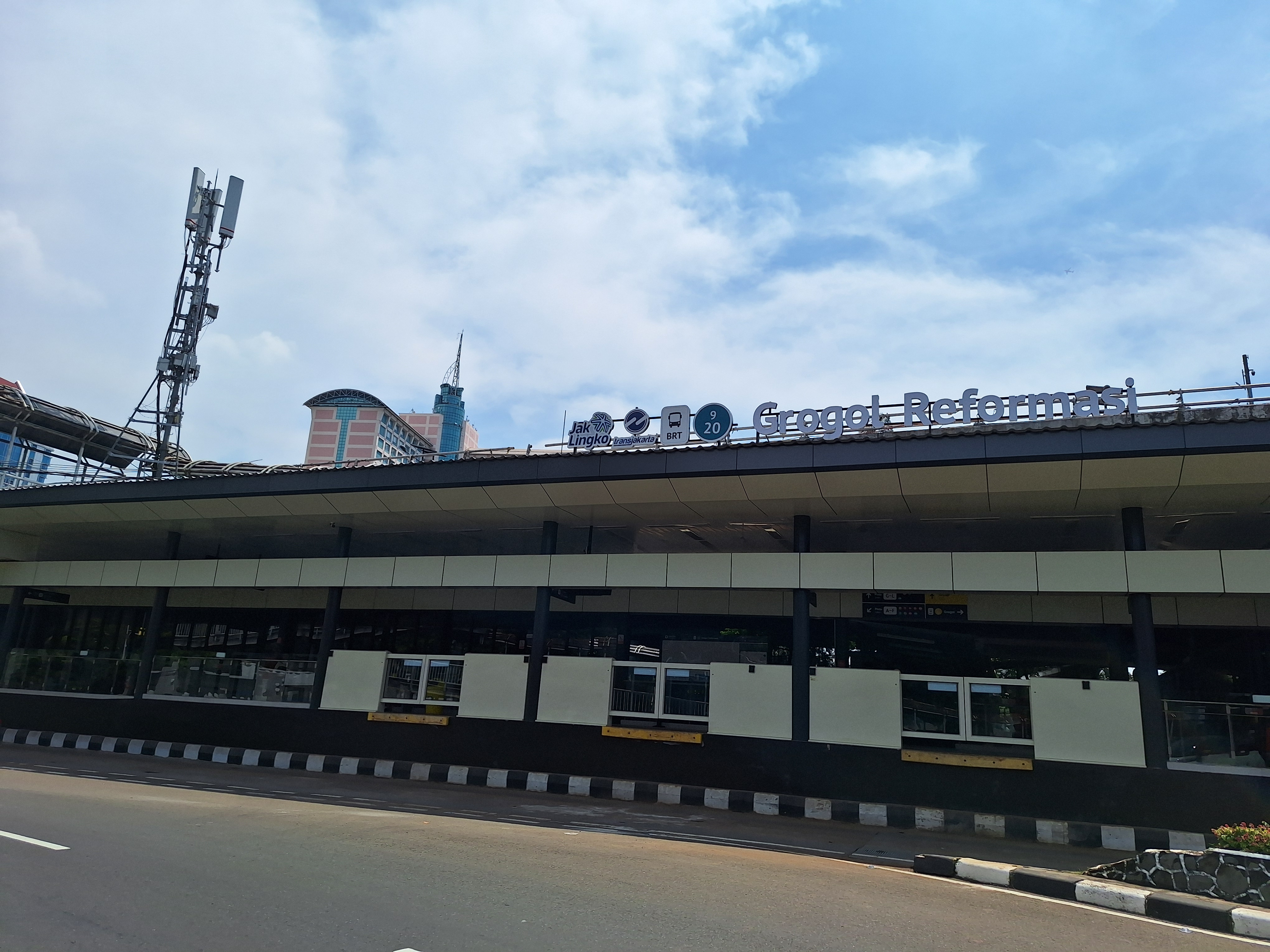
- Side view of the east building

General information
- Location: Letjen S. Parman Street; Tomang, Grogol Petamburan (eastern side); Tanjung Duren Utara, Grogol Petamburan (western side); West Jakarta 11470, Indonesia
- Coordinates: 6.167393°S 106.788583°E
- System: Transjakarta bus rapid transit station
- Owner: Transjakarta
- Operator: Transjakarta
- Lines: List of Transjakarta corridors#Cross-corridor routes List of TransJakarta corridors#Corridor 8 List of TransJakarta corridors#Corridor 9 List of TransJakarta corridors#Cross-corridor routes
- Platforms: Two side platforms connected with a linkway
- Connections: Grogol

Construction
- Structure type: At-grade

Other information
- Status: In service

History
- Opened: 21 February 2009
- Rebuilt: 6 April 2024
- Former names: Grogol 2 Grogol 2: 12 Mei Reformasi

Services
Preceding		Following
Jelambar One-way operation	Corridor 3 Route 3F	Tanjung Duren towards Senayan Bank Jakarta
Jelambar One-way operation	Corridor 8 via Tomang	Tanjung Duren towards Pasar Baru
Tanjung Duren towards Pinang Ranti	Corridor 9	Kali Grogol towards Pluit
Tanjung Duren towards Cililitan	Corridor 9 Route 9A Terminus	Terminus
Roxy towards Pulo Gadung	Corridor 2 Route 2A transfer at Grogol	Jelambar towards Rawa Buaya
Jelambar towards Kalideres	Corridor 3 transfer at Grogol	Roxy towards Monumen Nasional
Jelambar towards Damai	Corridor 3 Route 3H transfer at Grogol	Roxy towards Kota
Jelambar towards Lebak Bulus	Corridor 8 via Cideng transfer at Grogol	Roxy towards Pasar Baru
Jelambar Terminus	Corridor 8 Route 8A Sunday morning only transfer at Grogol	Roxy towards Pasar Baru
Location

Grogol Reformasi is a Transjakarta bus rapid transit station on Letnan Jenderal S. Parman Street, Tanjung Duren Utara, Grogol Petamburan, West Jakarta, Indonesia, serving Corridors 8 and 9. It is also connected by a paid transfer linkway to Grogol station that serves Corridor 3. It is located near Mall Ciputra, Tarumanagara University, and Trisakti University.

The station is named after the district it is located in, Grogol. The word "Reformasi" (Indonesian for 'Reformation') was added to shorten the previous full name, Grogol 2: 12 Mei Reformasi, a name given on 10 November 2013 to commemorate the Trisakti shootings in 1998 that triggered the Fall of New Order and a transition to a new chapter of history of Indonesia.

== History ==
The station was opened at the opening day of Corridor 8 on 21 February 2009. Initially, the station only served the corridor's trajectory route, namely route 8A (Grogol 2–Juanda), which also served additional BRT stations that were not served by the main Corridor 8: Petojo, Tarakan, and Tomang Raya. On 3 March 2023, due to the construction works of the Jakarta MRT phase 2A, Corridor 8 was extended and rerouted to serve the three stations, as well as Grogol 2 and Tanjung Duren stations of Corridor 9. This station only serves northeast-bound buses towards Pasar Baru.

On 3 June 2023, Grogol 2 and its Corridor 3 counterpart were closed for revitalisation works. Transjakarta operated the temporary shuttle bus route 9ST (Damai—Kali Grogol) during revitalisation works. After 10 months of revitalisation works, the station reopened as Grogol Reformasi on 6 April 2024. The current name was unveiled during the revitalisation process in late December 2023.

== Building and layout ==
Grogol Reformasi station consists of two side platforms, one serving each direction. However, as the station is located beneath the Jakarta Inner Ring Road instead of sandwiching it, the station has a transfer linkway connecting the two side platforms, allowing transfers from any direction within one paid area. The western platform is located at the junction of the Grogol River and Sekretaris River.

Before revitalisation works, each of the side platforms was narrow. The eastern side had six bus bays, while the western side only had three. The transfer linkway to Corridor 3 was located at the northern end of the station, with an unpaid skybridge to exit the station at the southern end.

After revitalisation works, the new station is much wider, and the western platform has five bus bays. The station also features an open-top design that allows air to circulate freely. There are also new amenities, such as toilets, disabled-friendly toilets, and a lift to access the transfer linkway to Corridor 3. In addition, there is a new exit at the northern end of the station.

East	towards Pasar Baru	towards Senayan Bank Jakarta, towards Pinang Ranti, dan towards Cililitan (Tj. Duren) →
	Side platform, doors open on the right
		Jakarta Inner Ring Road →	(towards Tomang) →
← (towards Pluit)	Linkway	← Jakarta Inner Ring Road
			Grogol River
	Side platform, doors open on the right
East	← (Kali Grogol) towards Pluit and arrivals

== Non-BRT bus services ==
Type	Route	Destination	Notes
Inner city feeder		Grogol Reformasi—Batusari	Inside the station
Inner city feeder		Tanah Abang—Tanjung Duren	Inside the station
Inner city feeder		Jelambar—Kebayoran	Outside the station
Cross-border feeder (Transjabodetabek)		BSD City–Jelambar	Outside the station
Mikrotrans Jak Lingko	JAK 53	Grogol—Pos Pengumben via Letjen S. Parman Street	Outside the station

== Places nearby ==
- Mall Ciputra Jakarta
- 12 May Reformation Garden
- Trisakti University

== Incidents ==
On 2 December 2019, a container truck hit the height-limit bar, causing it to topple. Corridor 9 was subsequently rerouted temporarily to go through Grogol Flyover without stopping at this station.

On 28 August 2020, a container truck hit the road median on Letjen S. Parman Street in front of the police station located in front of Mall Ciputra. The road median, as well as Moveable Concrete Barriers (MCB) of Corridor 9, were severely damaged. There were no casualties.
