= Transjakarta Corridor 8 =

Bus rapid transit route in Indonesia

- Lebak Bulus – Pasar Baru
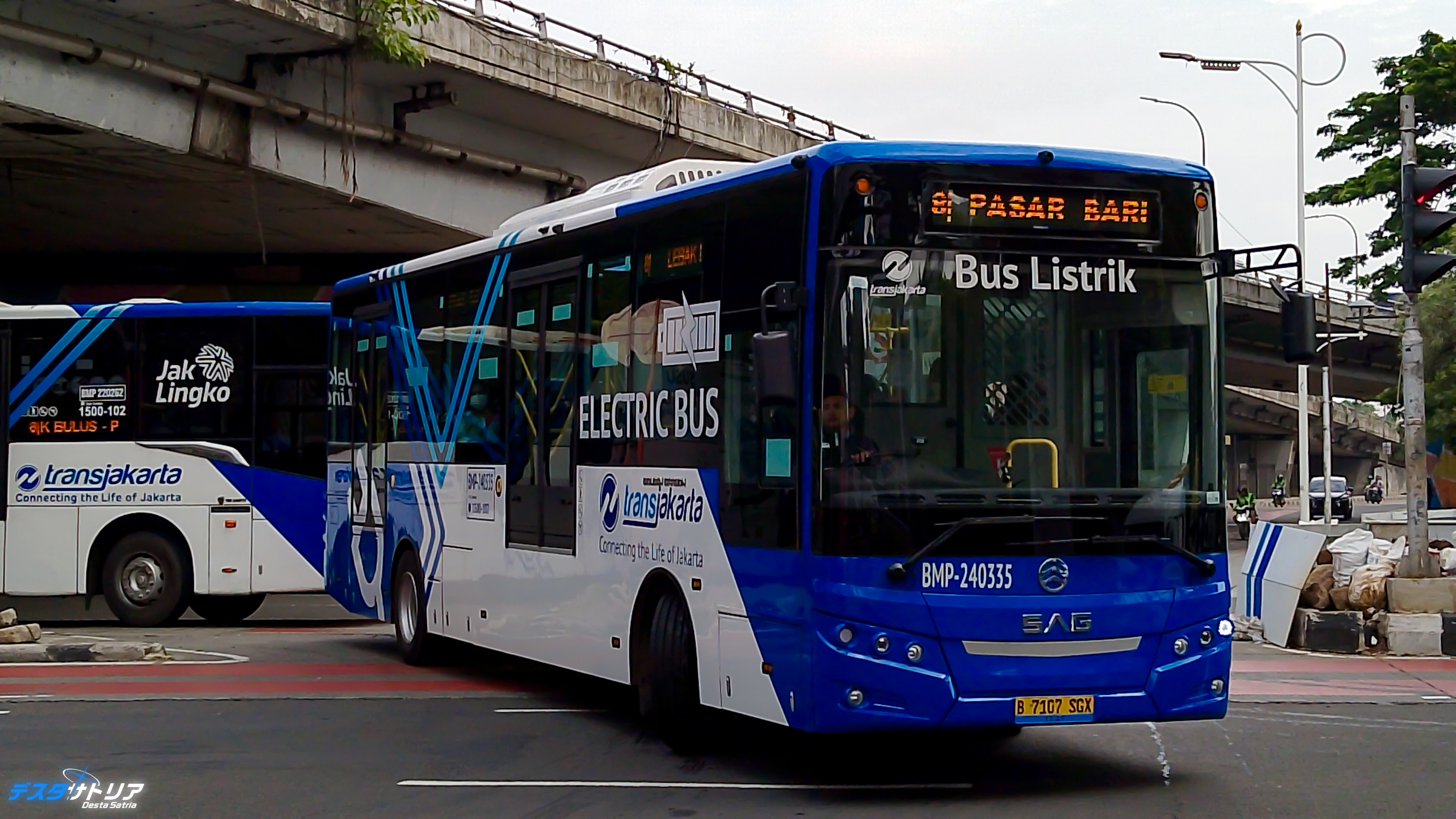
- The SAG Golden Dragon electric bus fleet that serves Corridor 8, entering Grogol Reformasi BRT station

Overview
- System: Transjakarta
- Operator: PT. Transportasi Jakarta (infrastructures and staffs); Bianglala Metropolitan (fleets and drivers)
- Began service: 21 February 2009

Route
- Route type: Street-level Bus Rapid Transit
- Locale: West Jakarta; Central Jakarta; South Jakarta
- Length: 25.33 km
- Stations: 20 (original); 26 (current temporary adjustment, via Tomang); 24 (current temporary adjustment, via Cideng)

Transjakarta Corridor 8 is a bus rapid transit corridor in Jakarta, Indonesia, operated by Transjakarta. It serves the route from Lebak Bulus BRT station in South Jakarta to the Pasar Baru BRT station in Central Jakarta. The corridor traverses along Pasar Jumat, Ciputat Raya, TB Simatupang, Metro Pondok Indah, Arteri Pondok Indah (Sultan Iskandar Muda), Teuku Nyak Arif, Letjen Supeno, Panjang, Daan Mogot, Letjen S. Parman, Tomang Raya, Balikpapan, Suryopranoto, Ir. Hj. Djuanda, and Pos streets, and terminates at Pasar Baru. Then continues via Gedung Kesenian, Lapangan Banteng Utama, and Katedral streets towards Lebak Bulus. This corridor is integrated with KRL Commuterline at Kebayoran railway station which serves the Rangkasbitung Line via Kebayoran BRT station, Tangerang Line at Pesing railway station via Damai BRT station, and Bogor Line at Juanda railway station via Juanda BRT station. This corridor is also integrated with the Jakarta MRT at Lebak Bulus station via Lebak Bulus BRT station.

Corridor 8 have a length of 25.33 kilometres (15.74 mi), making it the second longest Transjakarta corridor after Corridor 9 with 28.8 kilometres (17.9 mi) length (until 3 March 2023, from Lebak Bulus to Harmoni. Prior to temporary extension to Pasar Baru).

This corridor originally terminates at Harmoni BRT station, one of the main interchange stations on the Transjakarta BRT system. Due to the construction of the Jakarta MRT phase 2A, Corridor 8 temporarily terminates at Pasar Baru as of 3 March 2023. There are two distinct versions of this corridor: the main route, "Lebak Bulus–Pasar Baru via Tomang" which goes through Tarakan, Tomang Raya, Tanjung Duren, and Grogol Reformasi stations and runs at a headway of 5-10 minutes, and the alternative "Lebak Bulus–Pasar Baru via Cideng" which interlines with Corridor 3 from Petojo to Damai stations (stopping at Grogol and Roxy stations) and runs at a headway of up to 50 minutes off-peak or 5-10 minutes at peak.

== History ==
=== Inauguration ===
Corridor 8 was inaugurated on 21 February 2009, by the Governor of Jakarta at the time, Fauzi Bowo. It originally serves the route from Lebak Bulus to Harmoni until it was temporarily readjusted in 2023.

=== Intermodal integration ===
In March 2022, the construction of a pedestrian skywalk in Kebayoran Lama, South Jakarta was started in order to create a transit point that connects Corridor 8 at the Kebayoran BRT station with Corridor 13 at Velbak BRT station and the Kebayoran railway station which serves the Rangkasbitung Line of the KRL Commuterline. To support the skywalk construction, Kebayoran BRT station was closed on 5 September 2022 for revitalization and Transjakarta users were diverted to use Bungur and Simprug stations during the closure. The Kebayoran Lama skywalk underwent a public trial on 21–24 January 2023, and inaugurated by the Acting Governor of Jakarta, Heru Budi Hartono on 27 January 2023, even though the revitalization of Kebayoran BRT station was not finished yet. Kebayoran station was reopened on 6 February 2023.

=== Temporary readjusment ===
Starting on 4 March 2023, as the impact of the construction of Jakarta MRT North–South Line extension to Kota Tua Jakarta, Transjakarta temporarily extends Corridor 8 to the Pasar Baru BRT station, due to its terminus, Harmoni being moved to a temporary building that can only serves Corridor 1 passengers. It took over Pecenongan, Juanda, and Pasar Baru stations from Corridor 3. At the same time, the route was modified to follow Route 8A (Grogol Reformasi–Juanda via Tomang), so the main route stopped serving Roxy and Grogol stations, instead taking over Petojo, Tarakan, Tomang, and Grogol Reformasi (towards Pasar Baru only) stations from Route 8A. This main route of Corridor 8 is officially listed as "Lebak Bulus–Pasar Baru via Tomang" and operates all day at a headway of 5-10 minutes. To respond to passenger complaints in regards to traffic jam in Tomang during rush hour, Transjakarta also operates an alternative "Lebak Bulus–Pasar Baru via Cideng" route which mimics the original Corridor 8 by interlining with Corridor 3 from Petojo to Damai instead of going through Tomang, thus stopping at Grogol and Roxy, and runs at a headway of up to 50 minutes off-peak or 5-10 minutes at peak. Route 8A still currently runs as a shortened main Corridor 8 (via Tomang) during Car Free Day (CFD) in Petojo area on Sunday mornings.

== List of BRT stations ==
- As the impact of the Jakarta MRT construction, Transjakarta temporarily extends the main Corridor 8 to the Pasar Baru BRT station, taking over Pecenongan, Juanda, and Pasar Baru stations from Corridor 3 that currently terminates at Monumen Nasional, by merging the previously all-day-available Route (previously Grogol Reformasi–Juanda via Tomang) with the main corridor, starting from 4 March 2023, until the MRT construction completed in 2027 or 2029. As the result, Petojo, Tarakan, and Tomang stations which were previously exclusively served by Route without any main corridor service are now served by main Corridor 8. Route is still available as a shortened main corridor during Car Free Day (CFD) in Petojo area on Sunday mornings, but now terminates at Jelambar and Pasar Baru. All routes currently do not stop at Harmoni.
- Currently, all stations are served by buses 24 hours a day.
- Station indicated by a → sign has a one way service towards Pasar Baru only.

=== Main route (via Tomang) ===
- This route runs at a headway of 5-10 minutes all day.

Corridor 8 (Lebak Bulus – Pasar Baru via Tomang)
| Code | Station name | Transfer/Notes | Bus terminal or train station nearby |
|---|---|---|---|
Stations in order: From top to bottom (downwards) towards Pasar Baru (→); from bottom to top (upwards) towards Lebak Bulus (←)
| 8 01 | Lebak Bulus | | Lebak Bulus Grab Lebak Bulus Bus Terminal |
| 8 02 | Pondok Pinang → | | |
Towards Lebak Bulus (←) heads straight to Lebak Bulus
| 8 03 | Underpass Lebak Bulus | | |
| 8 04 | Pondok Indah | | |
| 8 05 | Tanah Kusir | | |
| 8 06 | Bungur | | |
| 8 07 | Kebayoran | Velbak (via skybridge) | Kebayoran |
| 8 08 | Simprug | | |
| 8 09 | Permata Hijau | | |
| 8 10 | Arteri | | |
| 8 11 | Pos Pengumben | | |
| 8 12 | Kelapa Dua Sasak | | |
| 8 13 | Kebon Jeruk | | |
| 8 14 | Duri Kepa | | |
| 8 15 | Kedoya Panjang | | |
| 8 16 | Kedoya | | |
| 8 17 3 09 | Damai | Damai | |
| 8 18 3 10 | Jelambar | Jelambar | Pesing |
| 8 19 9 20 | Grogol Reformasi → | Grogol Reformasi Grogol (via skybridge) | Grogol (Planned) Grogol Bus Terminal |
Towards Lebak Bulus (←) heads straight to Jelambar
| 8 20 9 19 | Tanjung Duren | Two separate buildings for opposing directions require exiting paid area to transfer: Eastbound: Towards Pasar Baru (→); Westbound: Towards Lebak Bulus (←) | Taman Anggrek (planned) |
| 8 20 9 19 | Tanjung Duren | Tanjung Duren | Taman Anggrek (planned) |
| 8 21 | Tomang Raya | Tomang Raya | |
| 8 22 | Tarakan | Tarakan | Petojo (planned) |
| 8 23 | Petojo | Petojo | |
| 2 19 3 14 | Pecenongan | Pecenongan | |
| 2 18 3 15 | Juanda | Juanda | Juanda |
| 3 16 | Pasar Baru | Pasar Baru | |

=== Alternative route (via Cideng) ===
- This route runs at a headway of 5-10 minutes at peak hours and up to 50 minutes off-peak.

Corridor 8 (Lebak Bulus – Pasar Baru via Cideng
| Code | Station name | Transfer/Notes | Bus terminal or train station nearby |
|---|---|---|---|
Stations in order: From top to bottom (downwards) towards Pasar Baru (→); from bottom to top (upwards) towards Lebak Bulus (←)
| 8 01 | Lebak Bulus | | Lebak Bulus Grab Lebak Bulus Bus Terminal |
| 8 02 | Pondok Pinang → | | |
Towards Lebak Bulus (←) heads straight to Lebak Bulus
| 8 03 | Underpass Lebak Bulus | | |
| 8 04 | Pondok Indah | | |
| 8 05 | Tanah Kusir | | |
| 8 06 | Bungur | | |
| 8 07 | Kebayoran | Velbak (via skybridge) | Kebayoran |
| 8 08 | Simprug | | |
| 8 09 | Permata Hijau | | |
| 8 10 | Arteri | | |
| 8 11 | Pos Pengumben | | |
| 8 12 | Kelapa Dua Sasak | | |
| 8 13 | Kebon Jeruk | | |
| 8 14 | Duri Kepa | | |
| 8 15 | Kedoya Panjang | | |
| 8 16 | Kedoya | | |
| 8 17 3 09 | Damai | Damai | |
| 8 18 3 10 | Jelambar | Jelambar | Pesing |
| 3 11 | Grogol | Grogol Grogol Reformasi (via skybridge) | Grogol (Planned) Grogol Bus Terminal |
| 3 12 | Roxy | Roxy | |
| 8 23 | Petojo | Petojo | |
| 2 19 3 14 | Pecenongan | Pecenongan | |
| 2 18 3 15 | Juanda | Juanda | Juanda |
| 3 16 | Pasar Baru | Pasar Baru | |

== Special route ==
=== Route 8A (Jelambar – Pasar Baru) ===
- This route is available at certain times and headways during Car Free Day (CFD) in Petojo area, from 06:00 to 10:00 on Sunday mornings, though may run beyond 10:00 at times. During CFD, Corridor 8 is usually shortened to terminate at Tanjung Duren (via Tomang route) or Roxy (via Cideng route).

Route 8A (Jelambar – Pasar Baru)
| Code | Station name | Transfer/Notes | Bus terminal or train station nearby |
|---|---|---|---|
Stations in order: From top to bottom (downwards) towards Pasar Baru (→); from bottom to top (upwards) towards Jelambar (←)
| 8 18 3 10 | Jelambar | Jelambar | Pesing |
| 8 19 9 20 | Grogol Reformasi → | Grogol Reformasi Grogol (via skybridge) | Grogol (Planned) Grogol Bus Terminal |
Towards Jelambar (←) heads straight to Jelambar
| 8 20 9 19 | Tanjung Duren | Two separate buildings for opposing directions require exiting paid area to transfer: Eastbound: Towards Pasar Baru (→); Westbound: Towards Jelambar (←) | Taman Anggrek (planned) |
| 8 20 9 19 | Tanjung Duren | Tanjung Duren | Taman Anggrek (planned) |
| 8 21 | Tomang Raya | Tomang Raya | |
| 8 22 | Tarakan | Tarakan | Petojo (planned) |
| 2 19 3 14 | Pecenongan | Pecenongan | |
| 2 18 3 15 | Juanda | Juanda | Juanda |
| 3 16 | Pasar Baru | Pasar Baru | |

== Fleets ==
- Transjakarta (self-managed) (TJ):
  - Mercedes-Benz OH 1526 NG, white-light blue (additional unit)
- Bianglala Metropolitan (BMP):
  - SAG Golden Dragon XMLS125JEVJ0C3 e-bus, white-blue
  - Mercedes-Benz OH 1626 NG OM906LA A/T, white-blue and Jak Lingko card livery
- Mayasari Bakti (MB/MYS):
  - Mercedes-Benz OH 1626 NG OM906LA A/T, white-dark blue (MYS, only a unit is allocated)
  - Scania K310IB 6x2, white-blue (MYS, additional unit)

== Depot ==
- Bianglala Metropolitan (BMP):
  - Ciputat

== See also ==
- Transjakarta
  - List of Transjakarta corridors
