= Lebak Bulus (Transjakarta) =

Bus rapid transit station in Jakarta, Indonesia

8 01 Lebak Bulus
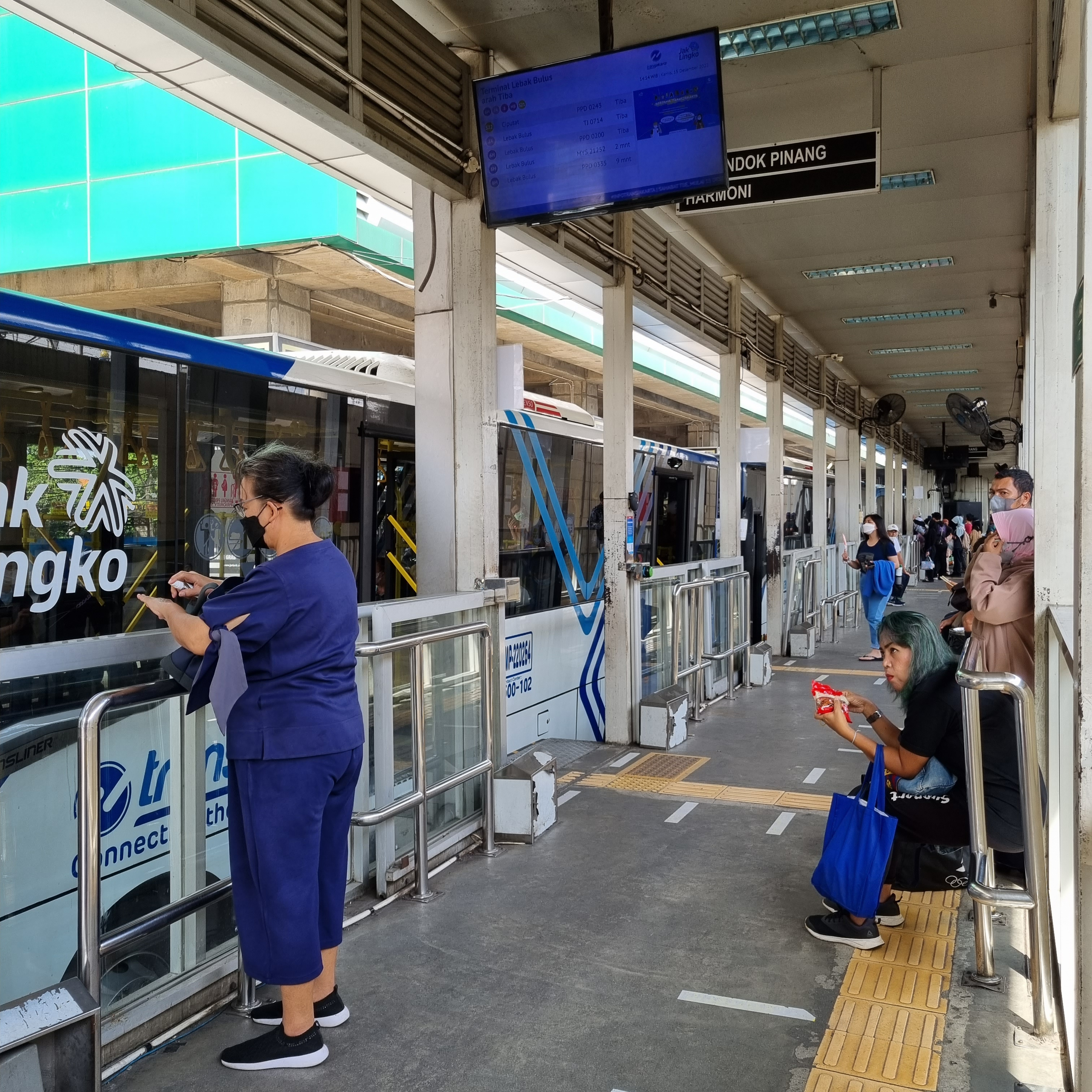
- View of the platform area

General information
- Location: Pasar Jumat Street, Lebak Bulus, Cilandak, South Jakarta 12440, Indonesia
- Coordinates: 6.2895°S 106.7742°E
- System: Transjakarta bus rapid transit station
- Owner: Transjakarta
- Operator: Transjakarta
- Lines: List of TransJakarta corridors#Corridor 8
- Platforms: Single side platform
- Connections: Lebak Bulus Bank Syariah Indonesia

Construction
- Structure type: At-grade

Other information
- Status: In service

History
- Opened: 21 February 2009
- Rebuilt: 31 October 2017; 8 years ago

Services
Preceding		Following
Underpass Lebak Bulus One-way operation	Corridor 8 Terminus via Tomang	Pondok Pinang towards Pasar Baru
Underpass Lebak Bulus One-way operation	Corridor 8 Terminus via Cideng	Pondok Pinang towards Pasar Baru
Location

Lebak Bulus is a Transjakarta bus rapid transit station located on Pasar Jumat Street, Lebak Bulus, Cilandak, South Jakarta, Indonesia. It serves as the southern terminus of Corridor 8 and is located near the Lebak Bulus MRT station, providing access to the North-South Line of the Jakarta MRT.

== History ==
The station opened on 21 February 2009 as the southern terminus of Corridor 8, which terminated at Harmoni until 2023. Before the construction of Jakarta MRT, the station featured a large structure with a spacious interior. It was situated in front of the bus terminal, featuring six bus bays on each side and an additional six facing east. The station was accessible through the main entrance, located in the middle.

To accommodate the construction of the MRT, the original station structure was demolished in 2015, and a temporary structure was built south of the bus terminal. Consequently, the resulting temporary structure was significantly smaller and narrower, accommodating only six bus bays facing north.

During the construction of the depot for the MRT, the temporary structure was relocated again to the western side of the under-construction MRT station in 2017. The new structure had the same design as the preceding temporary structure. Initially, a temporary street ran south of the station, with a platform facing south. Once this street was closed and the area beneath the station reopened for public use, the south-facing platform was decommissioned, and the north-facing side was rebuilt as the new side platform. This is the structure in service today.

== Building and layout ==
The station is one of the few terminus stations located on the sidewalk. It has six bus bays divided into two sections. The station is located in front of Exit D of the MRT station.

North
Side platform, doors open on the left
South	⬑ (Pondok Pinang) towards Pasar Baru

== Non-BRT bus services ==
Type	Route	Destination	Notes
Inner city feeder		Lebak Bulus—Senen	Inside the station
Inner city feeder		Lebak Bulus—Kampung Rambutan	Outside the station
Cross-border feeder (Transjabodetabek)		Lebak Bulus–University of Indonesia	Outside the station
Cross-border feeder (Transjabodetabek)		Lebak Bulus–Sawangan via Desari Toll Road	Inside the station
Cross-border feeder (Transjabodetabek)		Ciputat–CSW	Outside the station
Cross-border feeder (Transjabodetabek)		Ciputat–Kampung Rambutan	Outside the station
Royaltrans (premium)		Lebak Bulus–Summarecon Serpong	Outside the station
Mikrotrans Jak Lingko	JAK 03	Lebak Bulus—Andara	Outside the station
Mikrotrans Jak Lingko	JAK 32	Lebak Bulus—Petukangan Selatan	Outside the station
Mikrotrans Jak Lingko	JAK 45	Lebak Bulus—Ragunan	Outside the station
Mikrotrans Jak Lingko	JAK 49	Lebak Bulus—Cipulir Market	Outside the station
Mikrotrans Jak Lingko	JAK 95	Lebak Bulus—Pasar Minggu	Outside the station
Mikrotrans Jak Lingko	JAK 102	Lebak Bulus—Blok M	Outside the station

== Controversy ==
The current Lebak Bulus BRT station has faced criticism for being undersized because its operations still utilize the temporary structure built during the MRT's construction. Since the MRT opened in 2019, the station has suffered from overcrowding, as passengers transferring from the MRT must change at Lebak Bulus to access Corridor 8. There have been calls for the station to be rebuilt.

== Gallery ==
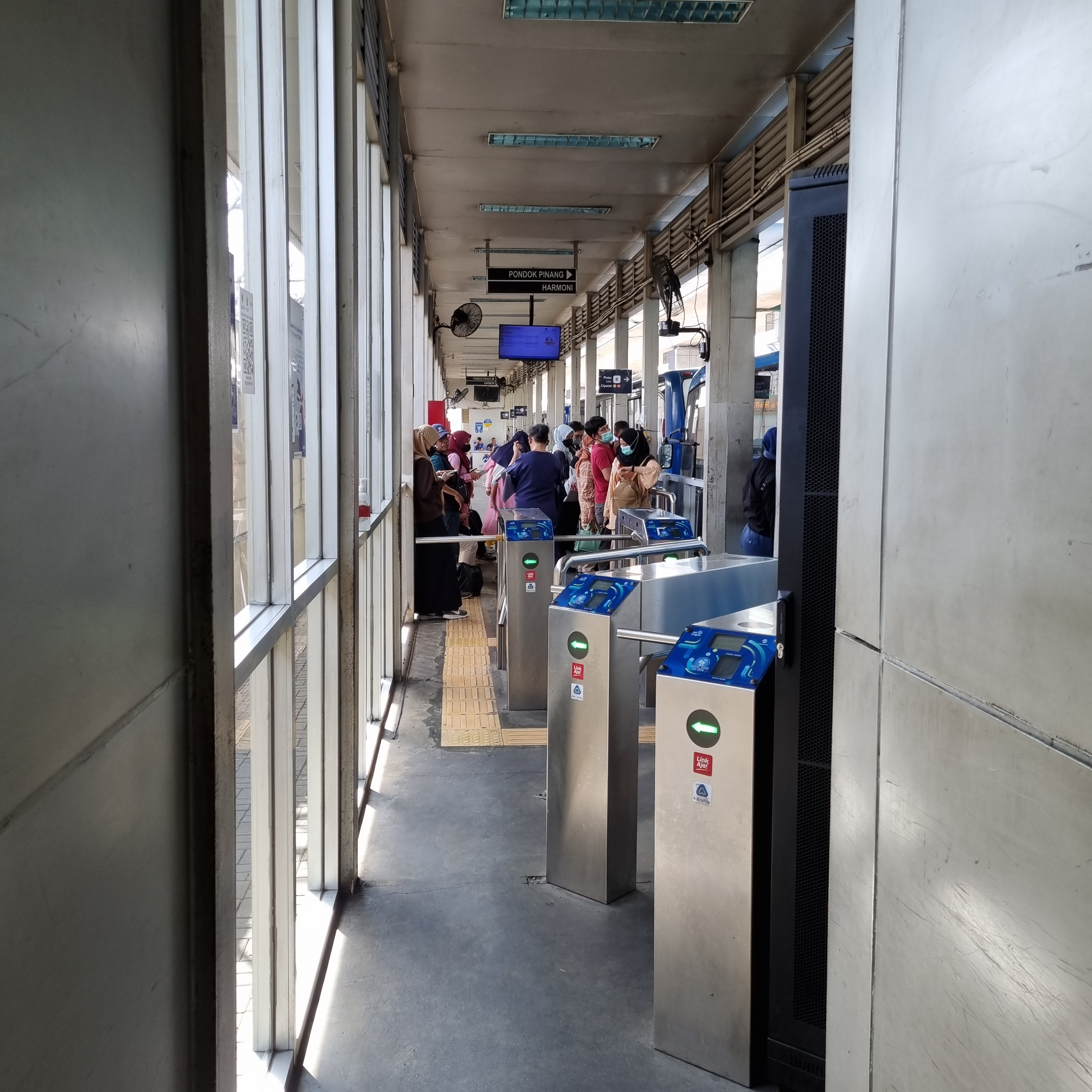
Fare gates at the entrance

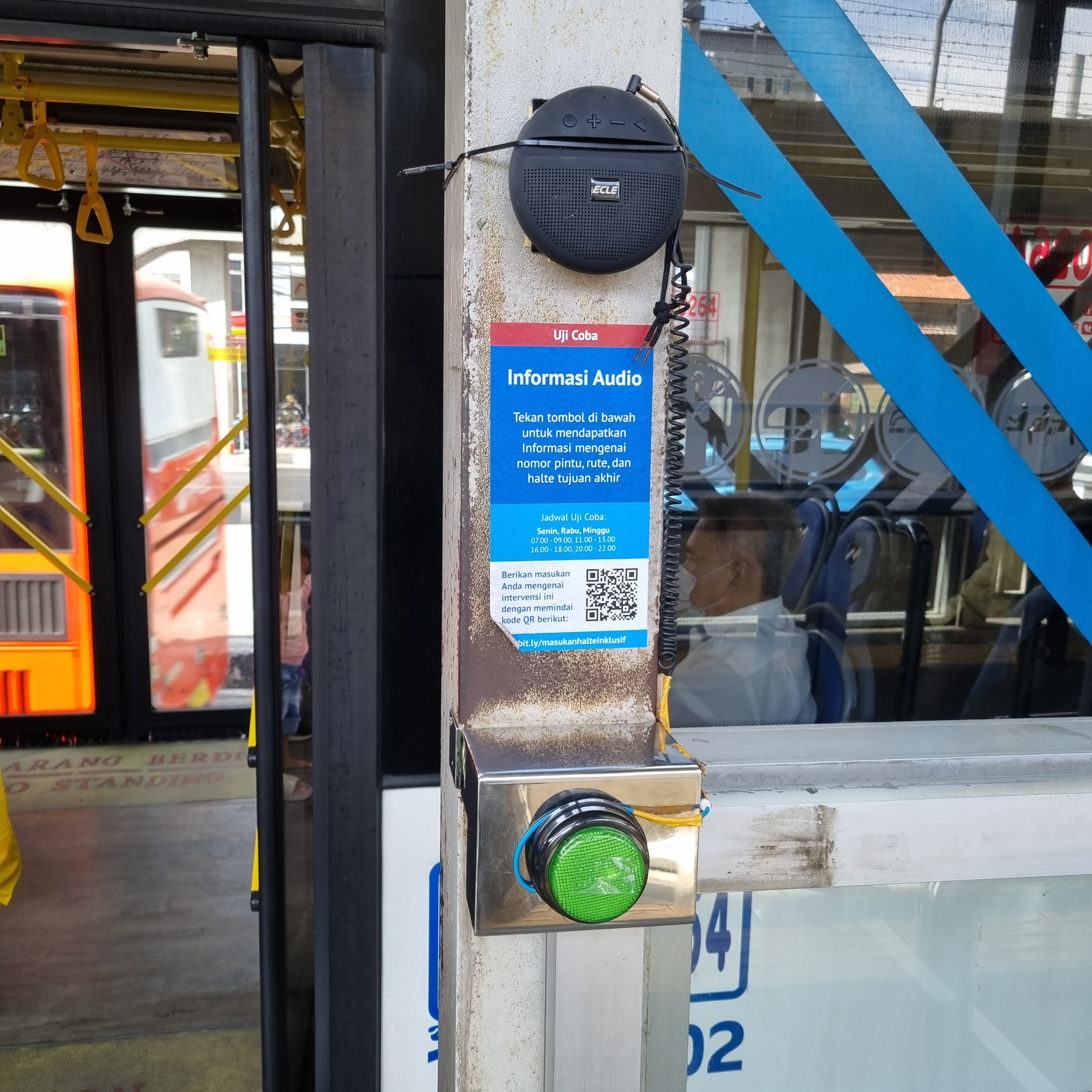
Audio assistive tool
