= Pasar Baru (Transjakarta) =

Bus rapid transit station in Jakarta, Indonesia

3 16 Pasar Baru
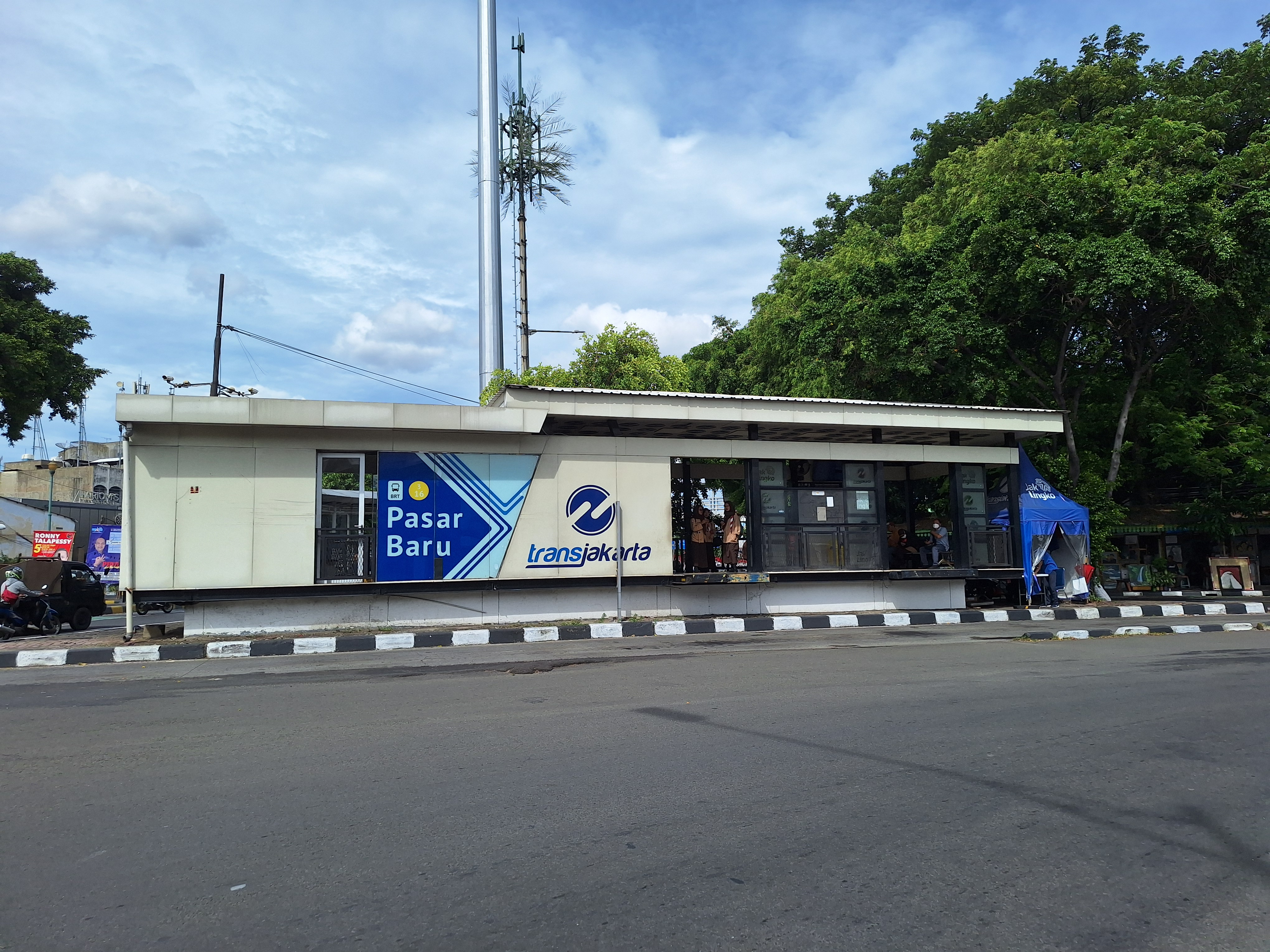

General information
- Location: Pos Street, Pasar Baru, Sawah Besar, Central Jakarta 10710, Indonesia
- Coordinates: 6.166062°S 106.834776°E
- System: Transjakarta bus rapid transit station
- Owner: Transjakarta
- Operator: Transjakarta
- Lines: List of TransJakarta corridors#Cross-corridor routes List of TransJakarta corridors#Corridor 8
- Platforms: Single side platform

Construction
- Structure type: At-grade

Other information
- Status: In service

History
- Opened: 15 January 2006
- Rebuilt: 16 January 2021

Services
Preceding		Following
Kwitang towards Kampung Rambutan	Corridor 7 Route 7F	Juanda One-way operation
Juanda towards Lebak Bulus	Corridor 8 Terminus via Tomang	Terminus
Juanda towards Lebak Bulus	Corridor 8 Terminus via Cideng	Terminus
Juanda towards Jelambar	Corridor 8 Route 8A Terminus; Sunday morning only	Terminus
Location

Pasar Baru is a Transjakarta bus rapid transit station located on Pos Street, Pasar Baru, Sawah Besar, Central Jakarta, Indonesia, which is the northeastern terminus of Corridor 8. It is located near the historic Pasar Baru market, Jakarta Art Building, and Lapangan Banteng.

Pasar Baru originally catered as the eastern terminus of Corridor 3 towards Kalideres. Since 2023, it is now temporarily redirected to Monumen Nasional as the original terminus of Corridor 8, Harmoni, had been relocated into small temporary buildings due to the construction of the Jakarta MRT North–South Line extension. Thus, Corridor 8 is currently terminates here at Pasar Baru.

== History ==
The station opened on 15 January 2006 as the eastern terminus of Corridor 3. On 16 December 2020, the station was closed for a month for revitalisation works, and was reopened on 21 January 2021 with a new design and an extra bus bay. The station's revitalisation also marked the start of a project to rebuild or renovate 46 BRT stations across the Transjakarta network.

On 4 March 2023, due to the construction of the Jakarta MRT phase 2A, which resulted in the closure of the original Harmoni Central interchange, Corridor 8 was extended to terminate at this station, as well as serving Pecenongan and Juanda BRT stations. To prevent overcrowding from Corridor 3 and 8 passengers, Transjakarta decided that Corridor 3 would cease operations to Pasar Baru and was rerouted to terminate at Bundaran HI station instead (until further shortening to terminate at Monumen Nasional). However, it is unconfirmed whether Corridor 3 will return to terminate here, given that the station still carries the Corridor 3 station number of "3-16".

== Station layout ==
North
Side platform, doors open on the left
South	towards Kampung Rambutan and towards Lebak Bulus (Kwitang/Juanda) →

== Non-BRT bus services ==
Type	Route	Destination	Notes
Inner city feeder		Blok M—Senen	Outside the station
#jakartaexplorer double-decker tour buses		Jakarta Skyscrapers (Pencakar Langit Jakarta)	Outside the station

== Places nearby ==
- Pasar Baru Market
- Jakarta Art Building
- Old Post Office
- Santa Ursula Primary School
- State High School 27 Jakarta
- Financial Services Authority (OJK)
- Ministry of Finance
- Statistics Indonesia (BPS)
- Lapangan Banteng

== Gallery ==
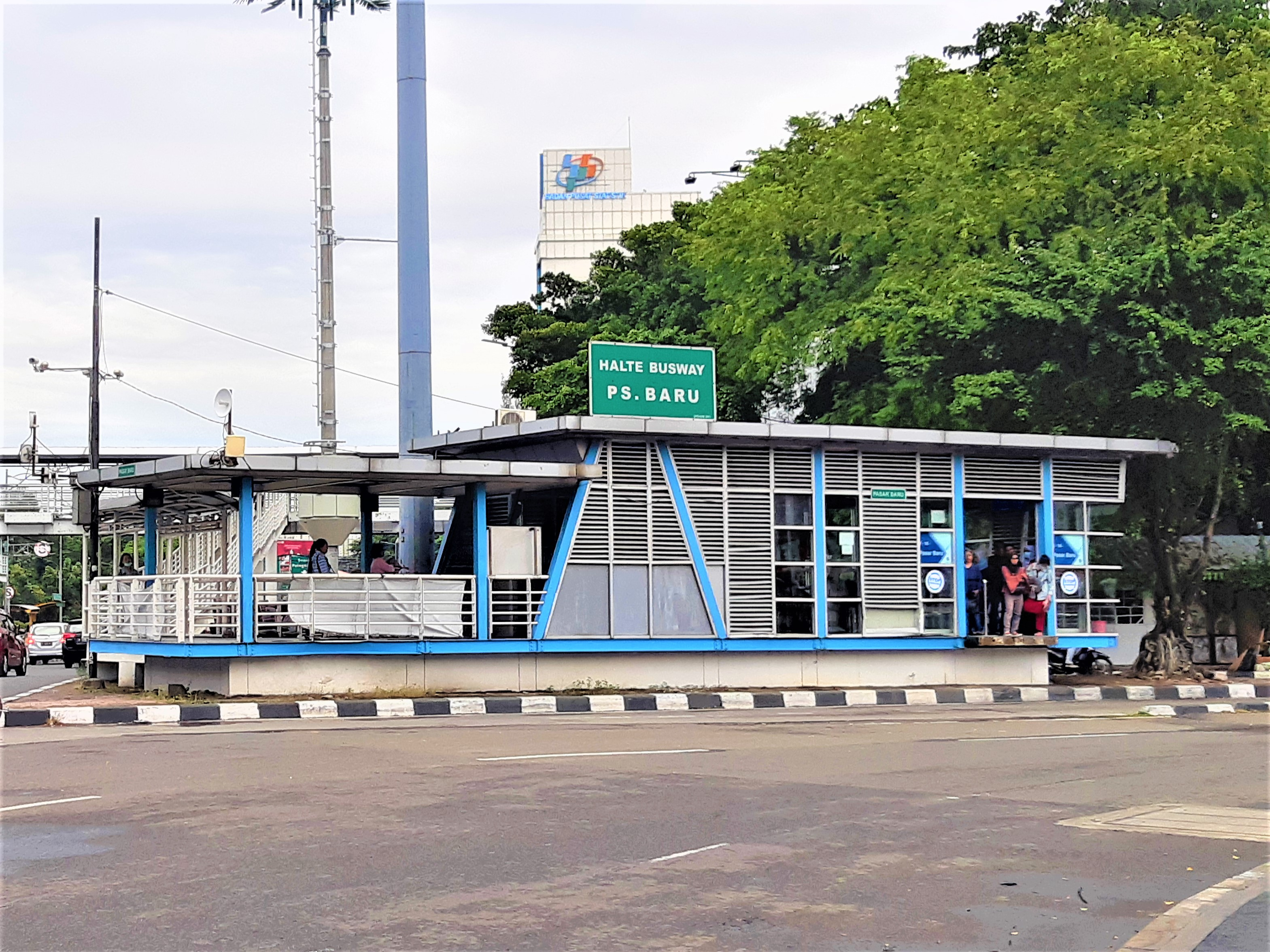
Station before revitalisation works, 2018

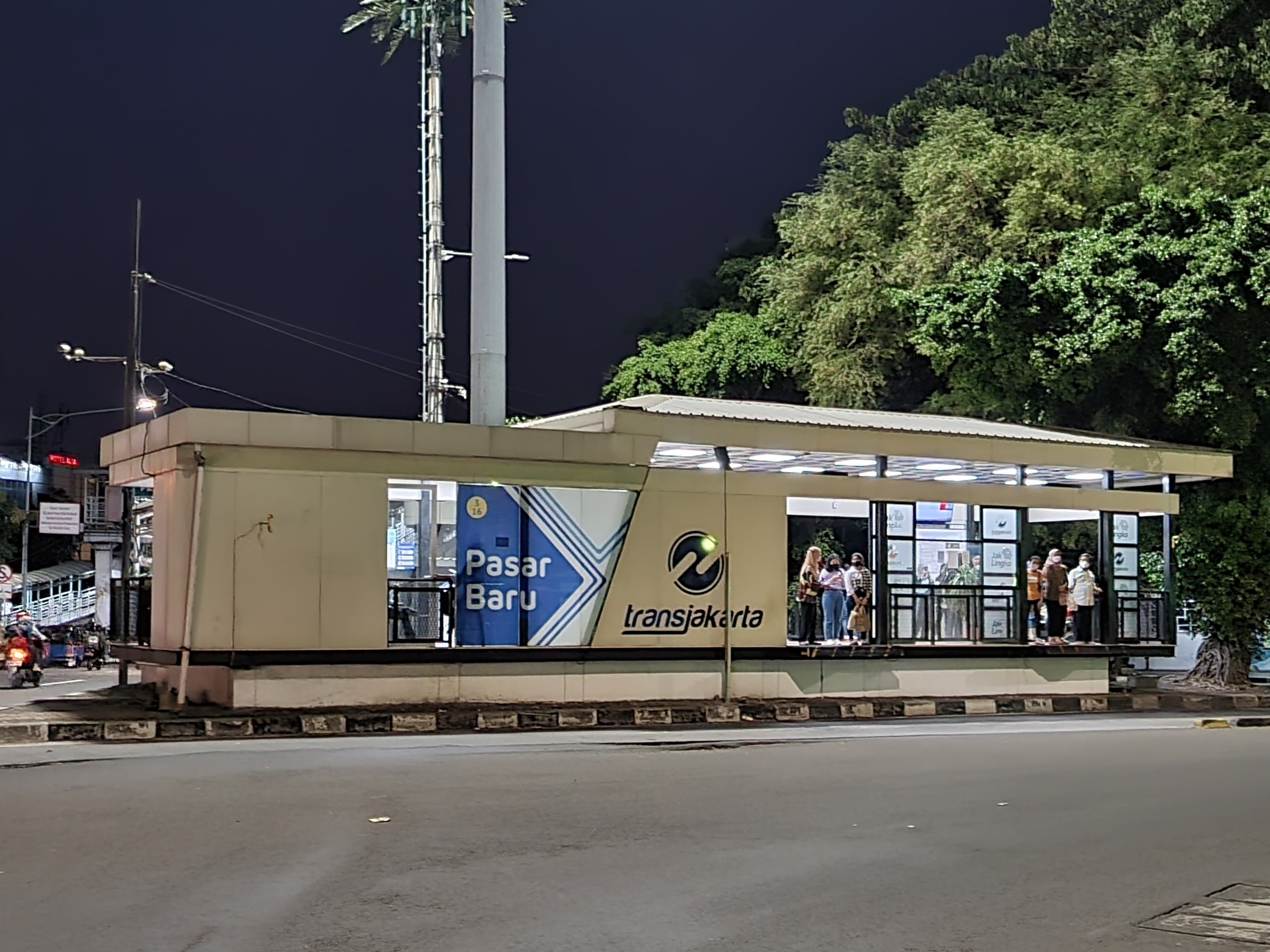
Pasar Baru station at night, 2022

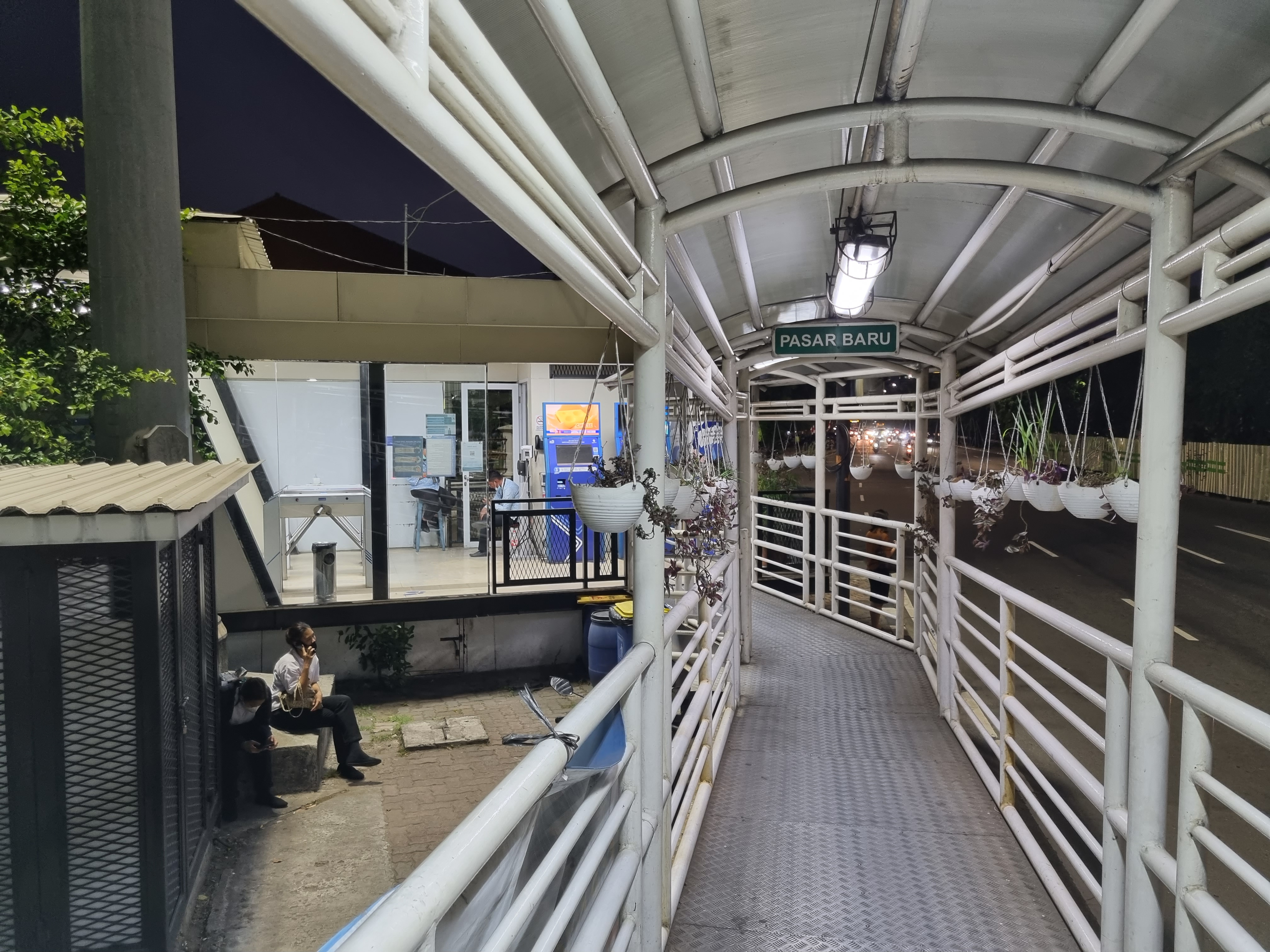
New entrance, 2022

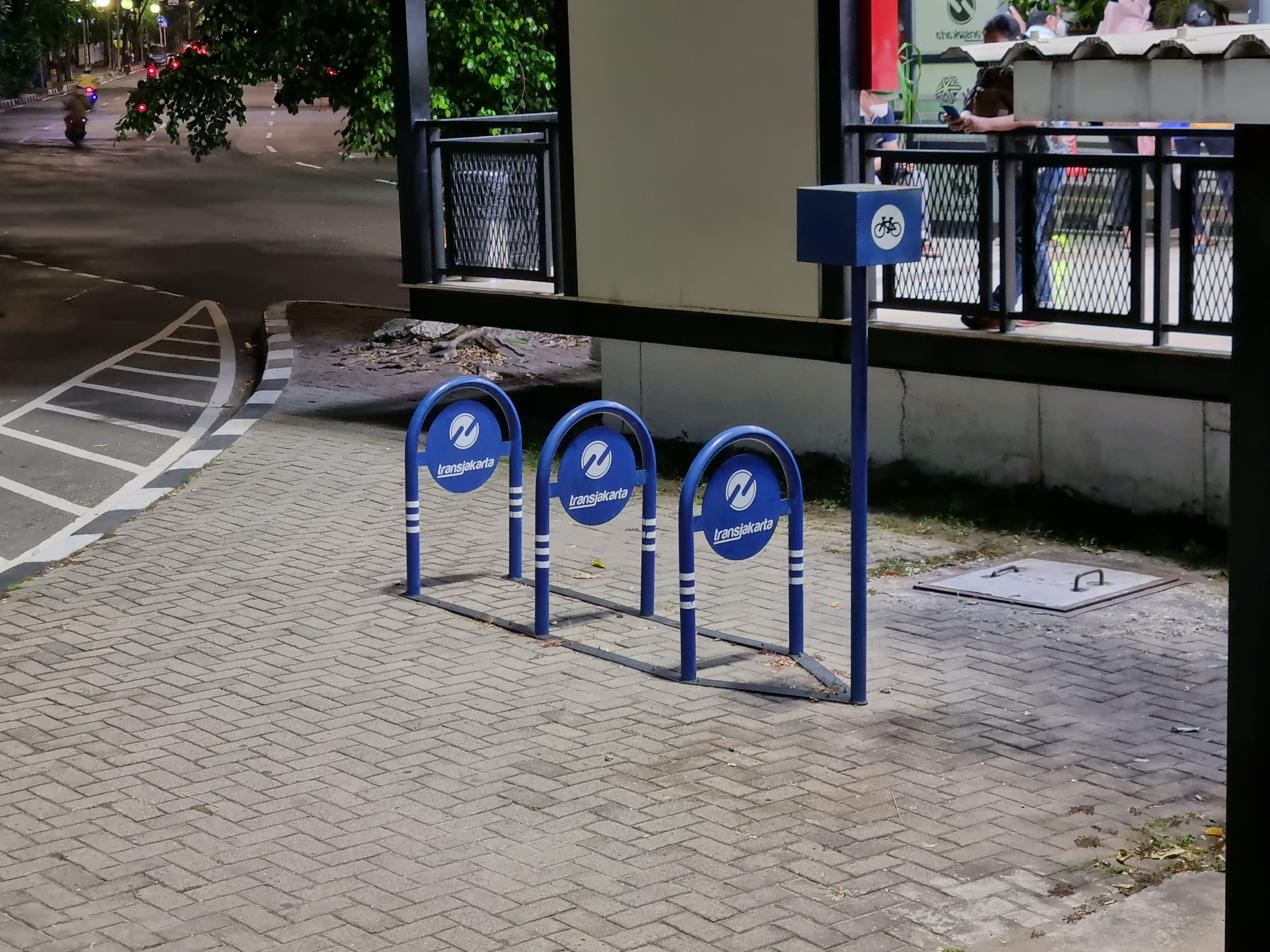
Bicycle parks, 2022

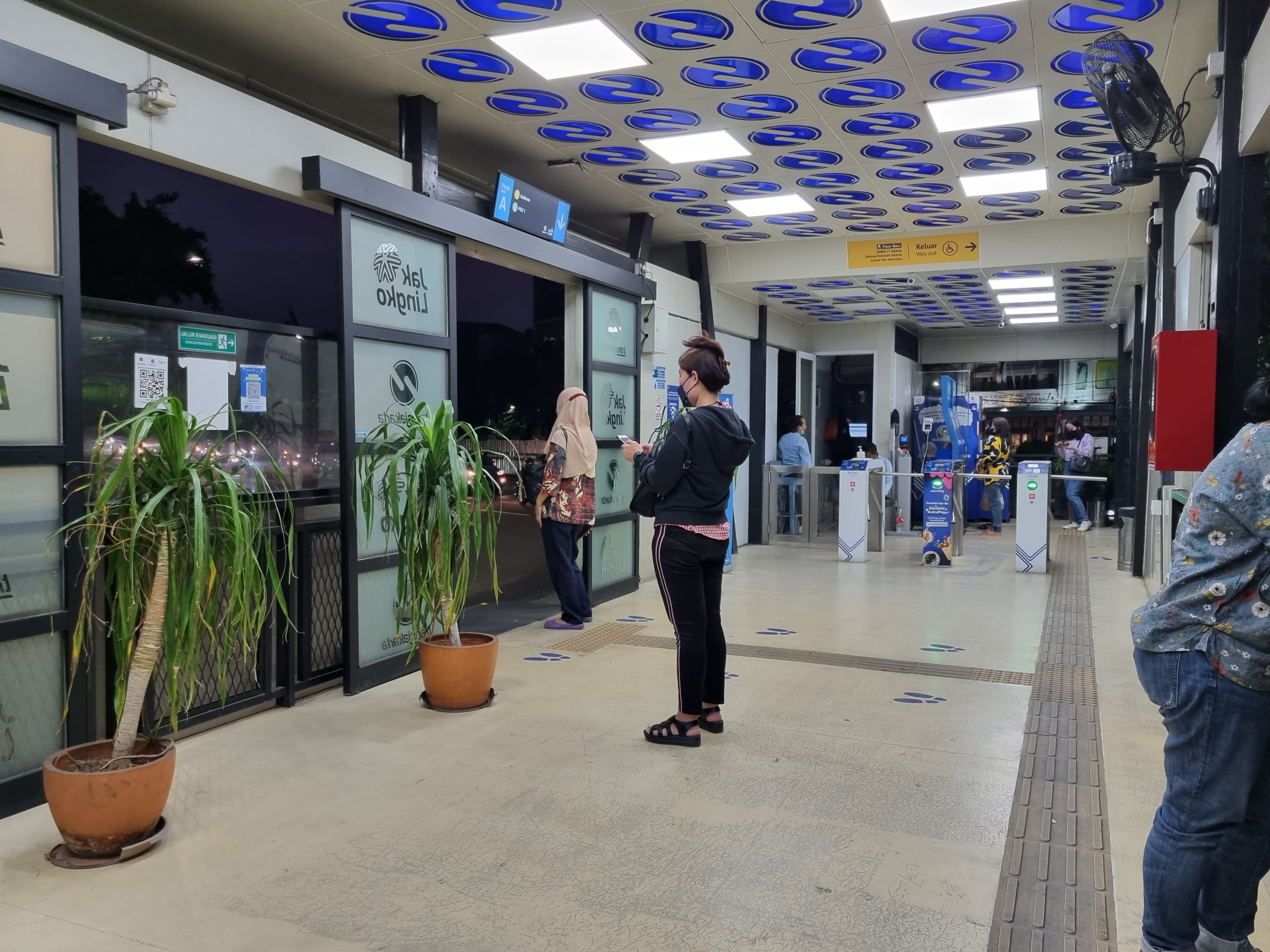
Interior of the station, 2022
