= Harmoni (Transjakarta) =

Bus rapid transit station in Jakarta, Indonesia

1 15 Harmoni
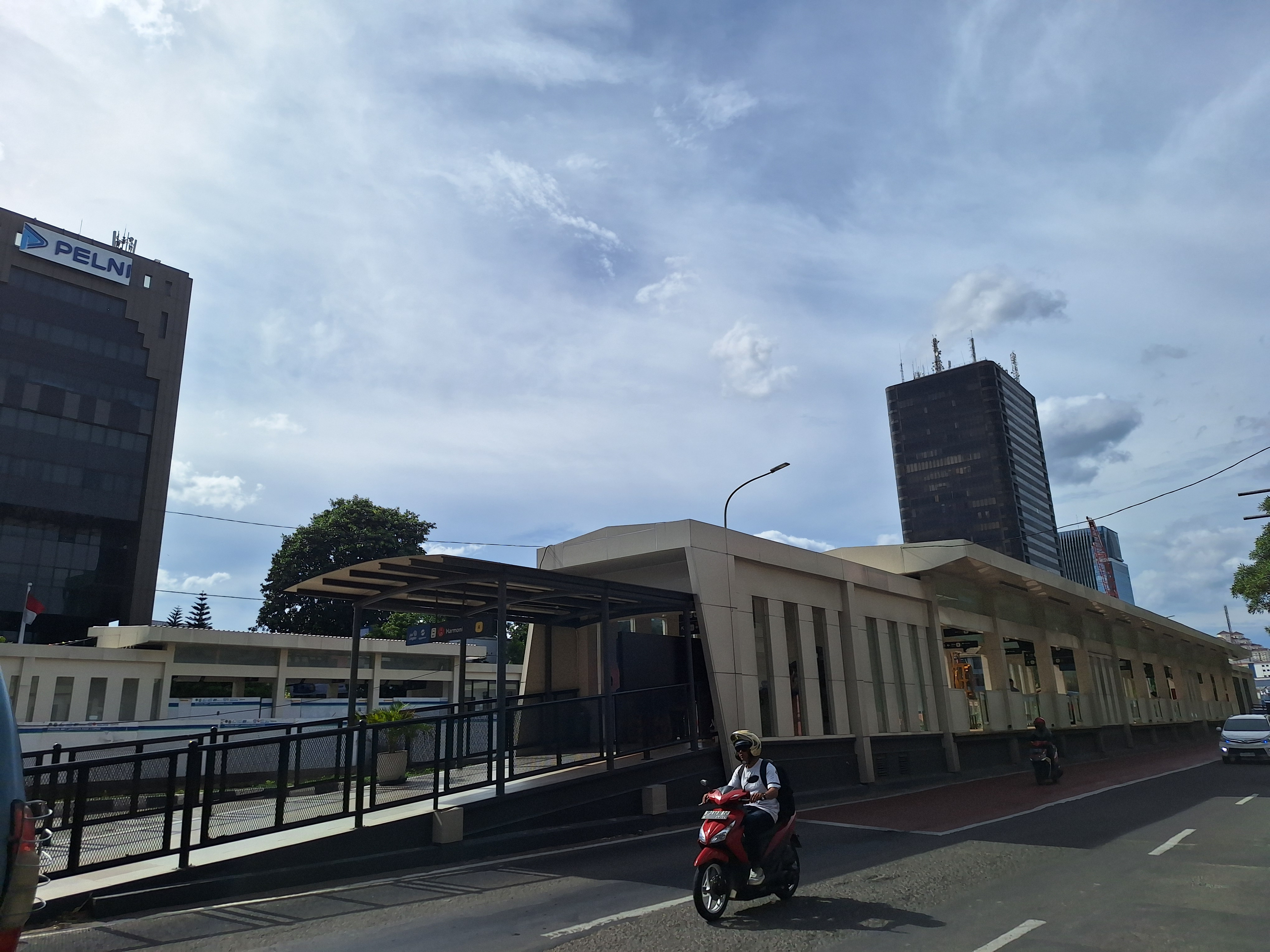
- The east temporary building of the station. The original building has been demolished for the construction of the Jakarta MRT

General information
- Other names: Harmoni Central, Harmoni Central Busway, HCB
- Location: Hayam Wuruk Road, Kebon Kelapa, Gambir, Central Jakarta 10120, Indonesia
- System: Transjakarta bus rapid transit station
- Owner: Transjakarta
- Operator: Transjakarta
- Lines: List of Transjakarta corridors#Corridor 1 List of Transjakarta corridors#Cross-corridor routes
- Platforms: Two island platforms with separate paid area per platform (one in service, one unused)

Construction
- Structure type: At-grade
- Cycle facilities: No

Other information
- Status: In service with temporary building

History
- Opened: 15 January 2004 (soft launch); 1 February 2004 (commercial operational)
- Closed: 4 March 2023 (original building)

Services
Preceding		Following
Monumen Nasional towards Blok M	Corridor 1	Sawah Besar towards Kali Besar
Petojo towards Damai	Corridor 3 Route 3H	Sawah Besar towards Kota
Location

Harmoni is a Transjakarta bus rapid transit station located on Hayam Wuruk Road, Jakarta, Indonesia. The name of the station comes from the Harmony Society Building, which once stood nearby its area. It used to be a central station and an interchange between corridor 1, 2, 3, 8, and other routes. Due to the ongoing construction of the Jakarta MRT, the operational of the station has moved into a temporary building located at the north of the original building. The temporary building has limited capacity that can only serves corridor 1 only and several routes have to be rerouted.

== History ==
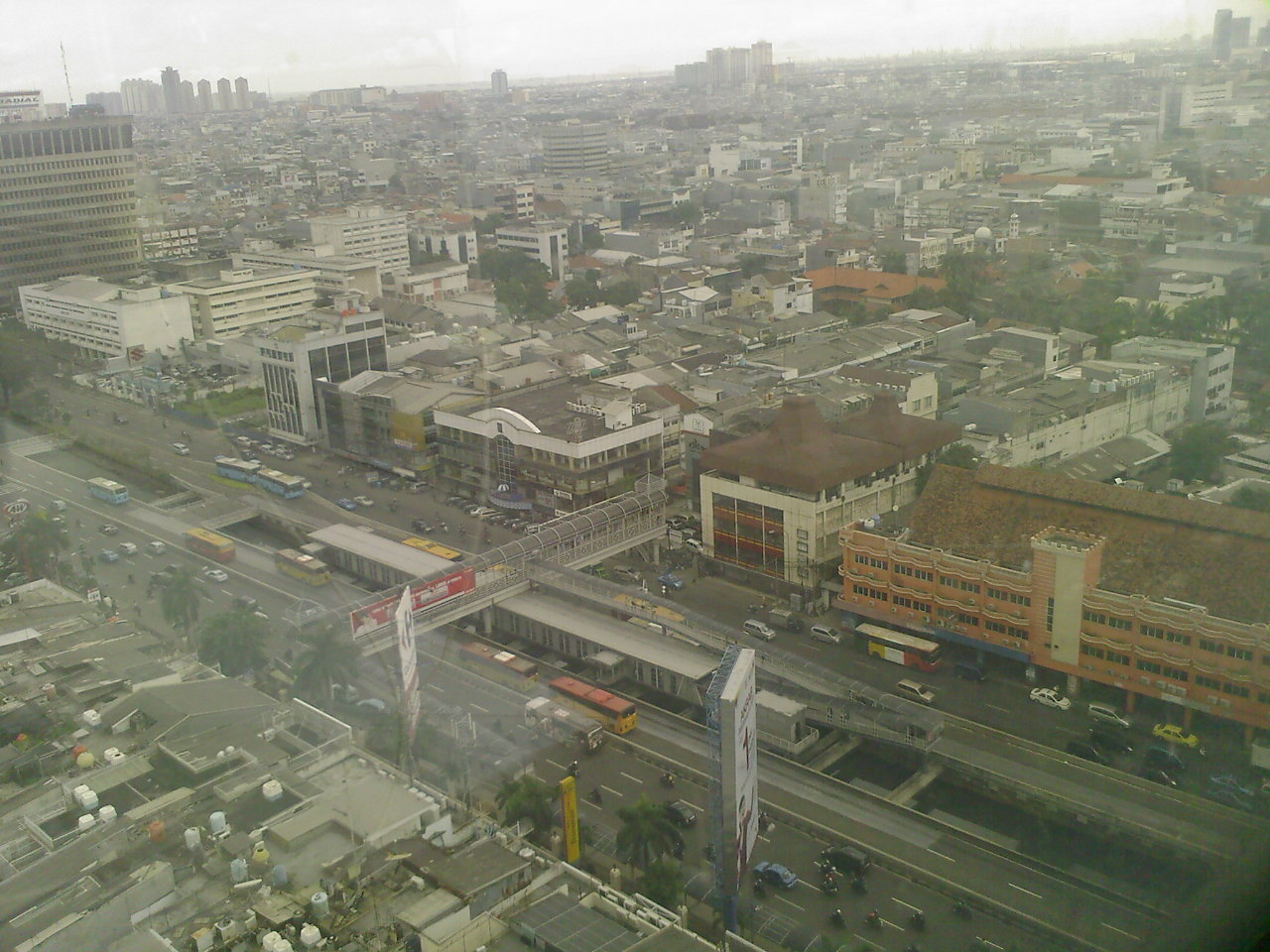
Harmoni BRT station seen from Bank Tabungan Negara headquarters, 2009

Harmoni BRT station was first opened on 15 January 2004, along with the soft launch of corridor 1. It has already designated as the main interchange hub and central station of the Transjakarta BRT system, hence the name Harmoni Central Busway. The original building was built above the Ciliwung river and had a large capacity up to 500 people with 18 platform bays (nine on each direction), accessible with a pedestrian bridge. Several routes that serves this station were corridors 1, 2, 3, 5C, 5H, 7F, 8, 8A, 9B, 10H, and 12M.

On 20 February 2023, Transjakarta and Jakarta MRT announced that Harmoni BRT station would be closed and moved its operational into a temporary building on 3 March 2023, due to the construction of the Harmoni MRT station as the part of the MRT's North–South Line extension from Bundaran HI to Kota. However, it was delayed for one day and Harmoni BRT station was eventually closed on 4 March, with all of its operational moved into the two separated temporary buildings.

Due to the limited capacity of the temporary buildings, several routes have to be rerouted, such as corridor 2 which temporarily terminates at Monas, corridor 3 at Bundaran HI (shortened to Monas on 29 May), corridor 7F extended to Juanda, and corridor 8 extended to Pasar Baru by merging corridor 8A (Grogol 2–Juanda). To accommodate passengers whom affeceted by this readjusment, TransJakarta operates one temporary route, namely 3H (Jelambar–Kota). TransJakarta operates corridor 3H because passengers of corridor 3 who wanted to go to Kota Tua Jakarta usually transfer at Harmoni. Therefore, a temporary route have to be provided to accommodate affected passengers. Transjakarta also operates 2ST temporary route (Juanda–Bundaran HI), which was closed on 16 November 2023.

The temporary building operational and route readjusments will last until the MRT construction completed in 2029 or 2030.

== Building and layout ==
Since 4 March 2023, Harmoni BRT station operates with two separated temporary buildings each located in Jalan Gajah Mada on west side and Jalan Hayam Wuruk on the east side. The west building (at Jalan Gajah Mada) only serves northbound buses (corridor 1 towards Kota), and the east building (at Jalan Hayam Wuruk) only serves southbound buses (corridor 1 towards Blok M).

As of 26 August 2023, the west building of Harmoni BRT station was deactivated due to a traffic diversion to support the MRT construction. Currently, the east building at Jalan Hayam Wuruk is serving buses from both directions.

West temporary building
West temporary building	Inactive island platform
Ciliwung River
East temporary building	towards Kota	(Sawah Besar) →
East temporary building	Island platform, the platform doors are opened on the right side of the direction of travel
East temporary building	← (Monumen Nasional/Petojo)	towards Blok M and towards Damai

== Non-BRT bus services ==
Type	Route	Destination	Notes
Inner city feeder		Pantai Maju Promenade–Balai Kota	Inside the station

== Places nearby ==
- Indonesian Presidential Palace Complex
  - Istana Merdeka
  - Istana Negara
  - Ministry of the State Secretariat
- Bank BTN head office
- Duta Merlin (former site of Hotel des Indes)
- Harris Hotel

== Controversy ==
In August 2022, a coffee shop kiosk was opened in Harmoni, which occupied almost half of the passageway that disturbs the highly crowded passenger flow. On 2 September 2022, the coffee shop was ultimately closed and removed after a public outcry.

== Incidents ==
On 8 October 2020, protesters of the omnibus law protest burned several parts of Harmoni BRT station. It suffers a heavy damage, where the glass were broken, debris scattered around, and the walls were vandalized.

== Gallery ==
Original building prior to MRT construction (2004-2023)

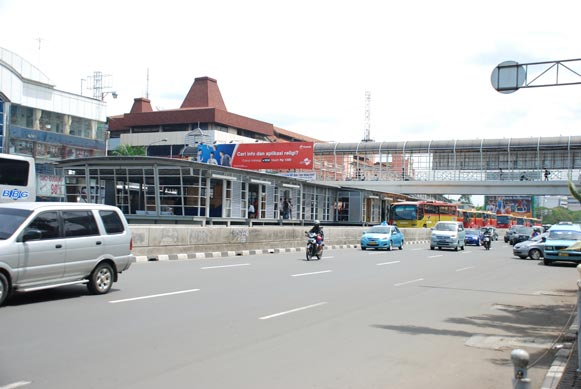
Harmoni BRT station view from Jalan Gajah Mada, 2009

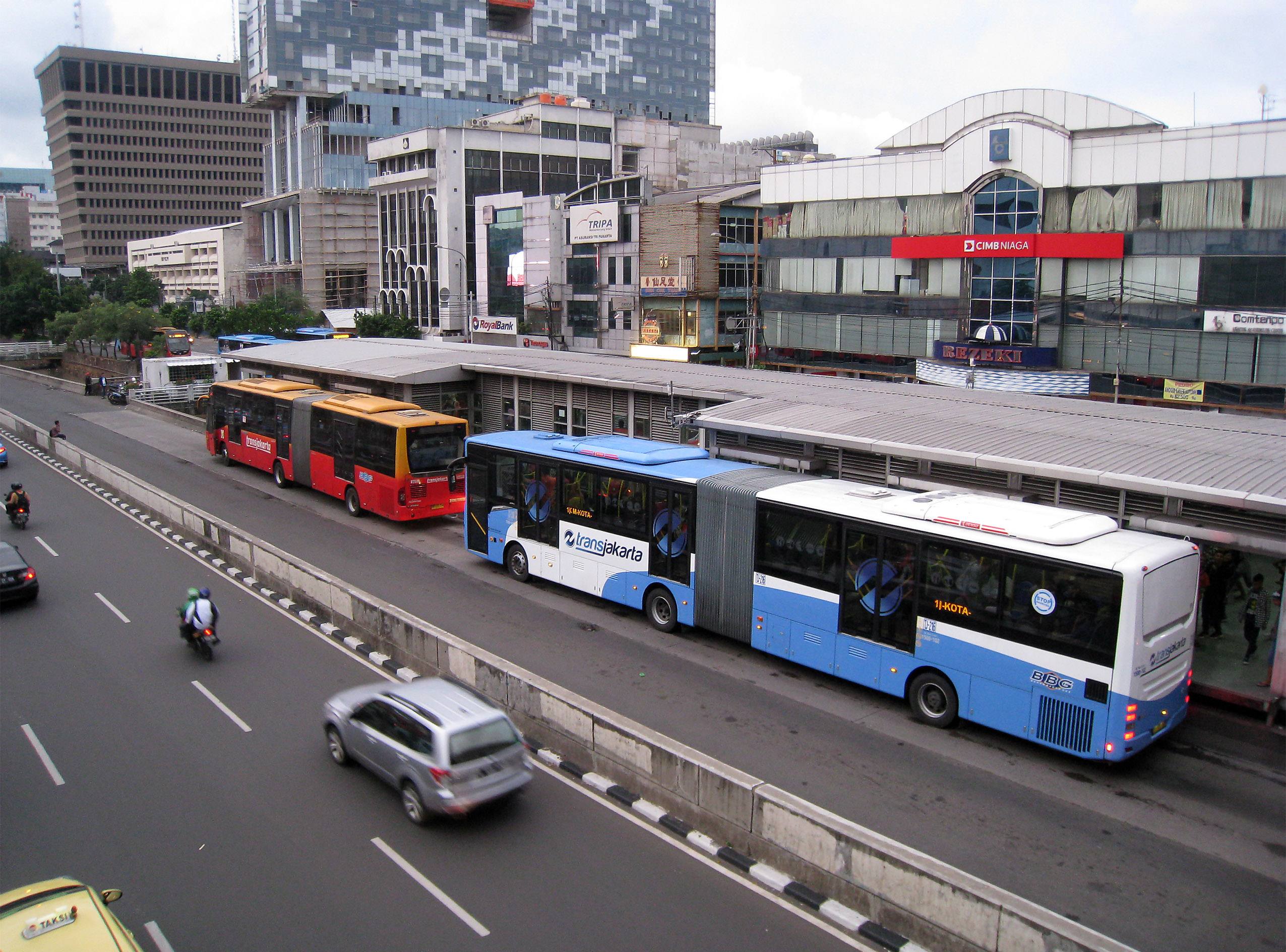
Transjakarta articulated bus fleets at Harmoni, 2016

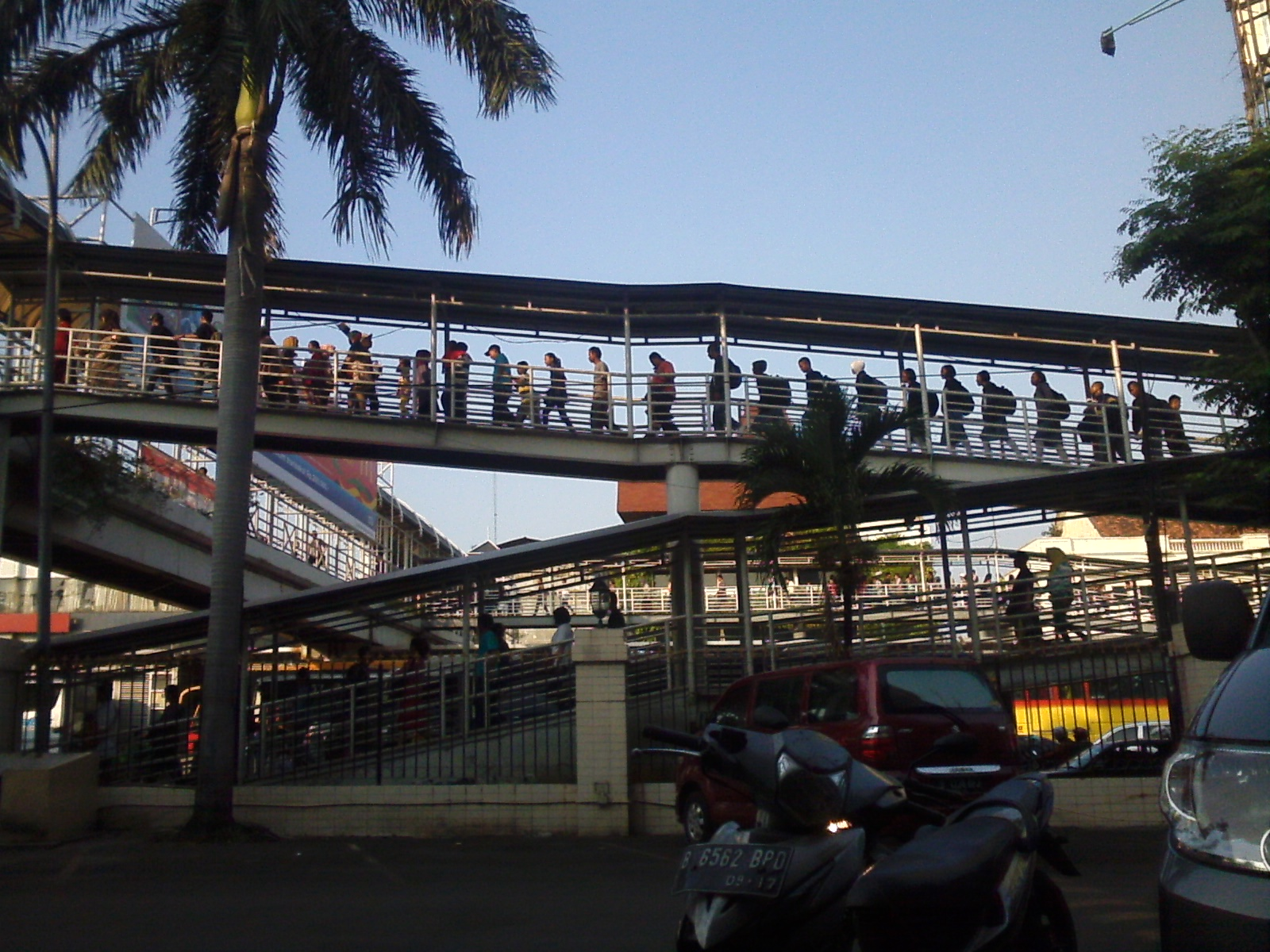
A long queue at Harmoni BRT station during rush hours, 2014

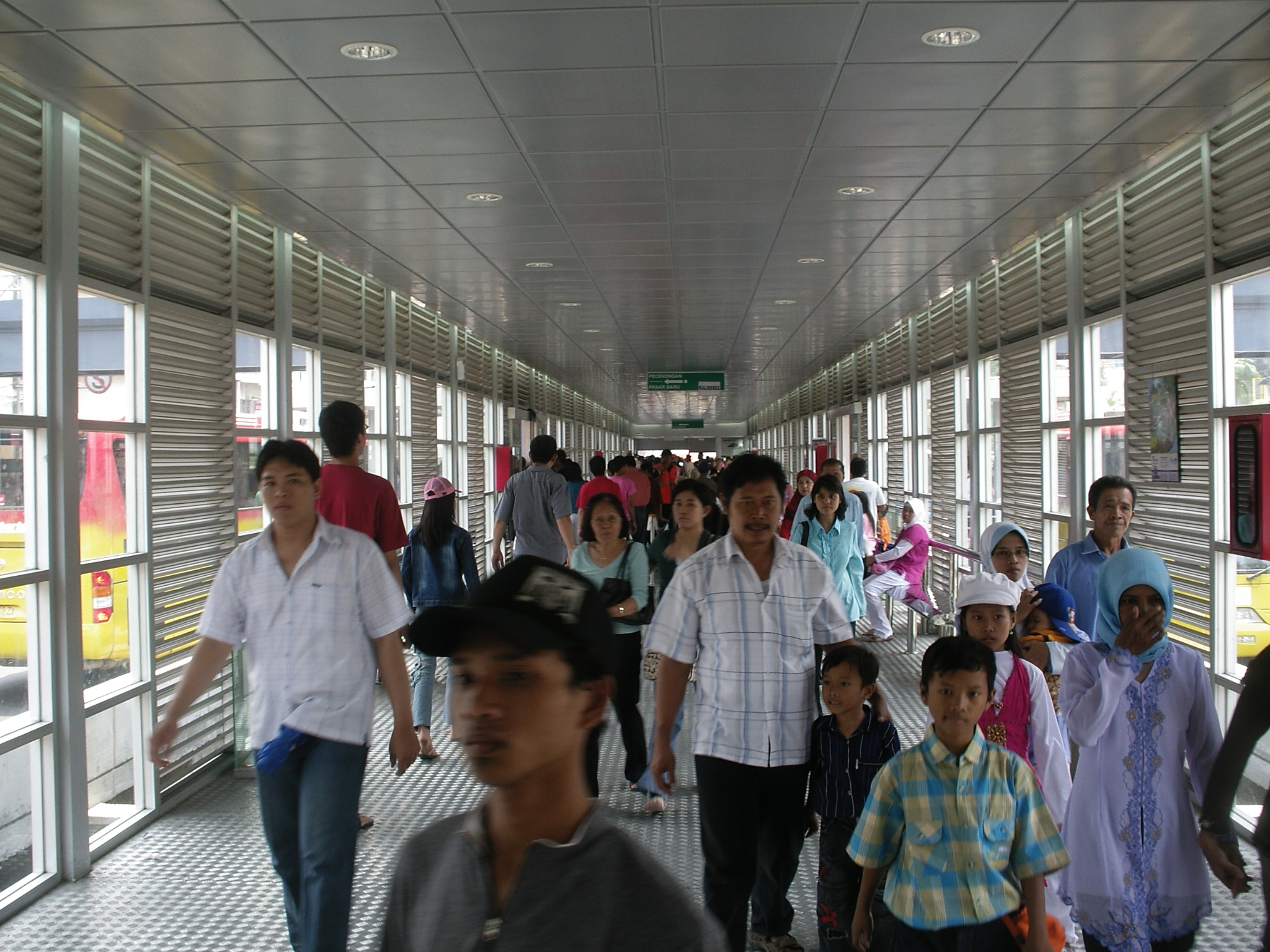
Crowds inside Harmoni BRT station, 2006

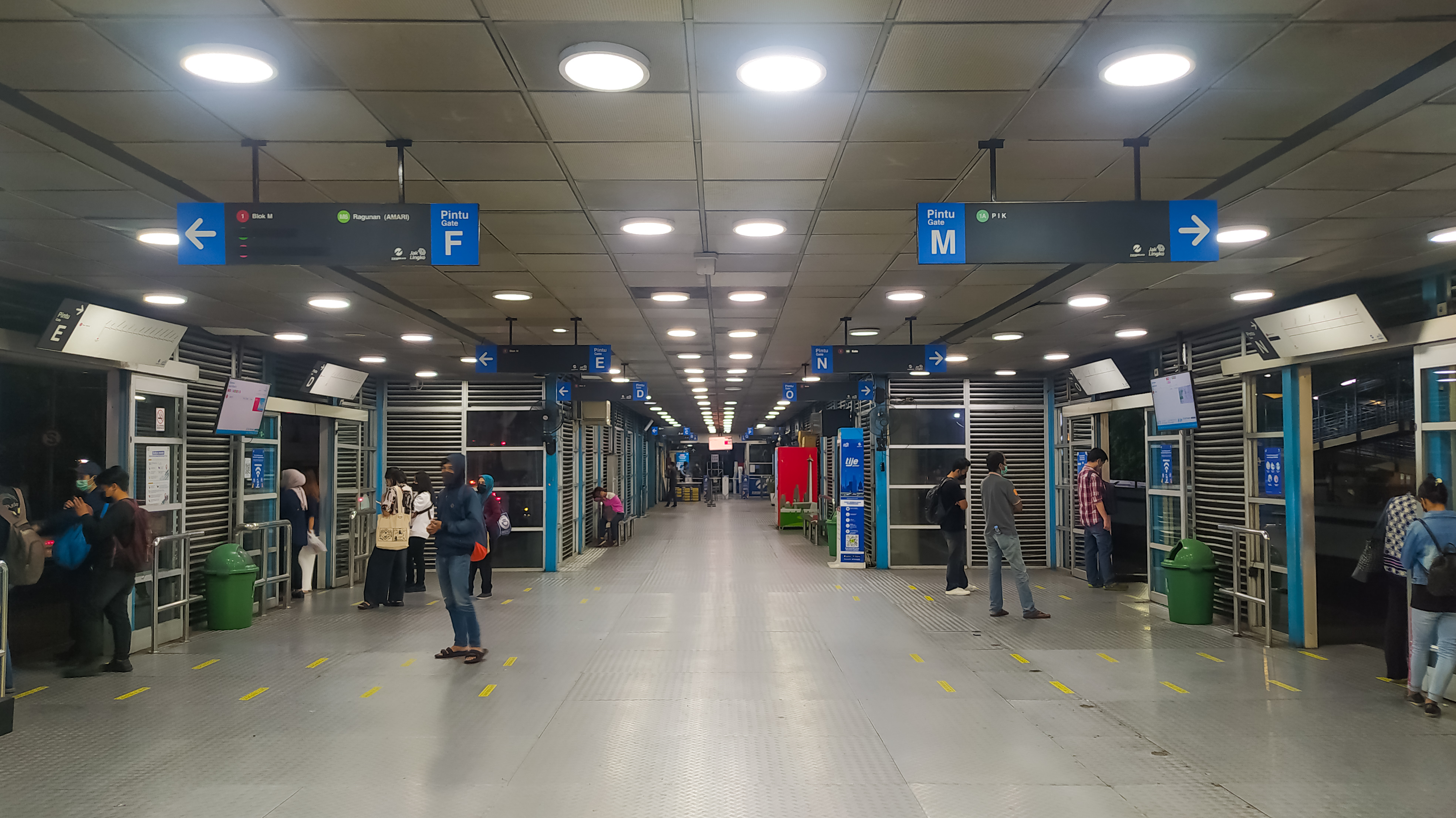
The platform area of the station, 2022

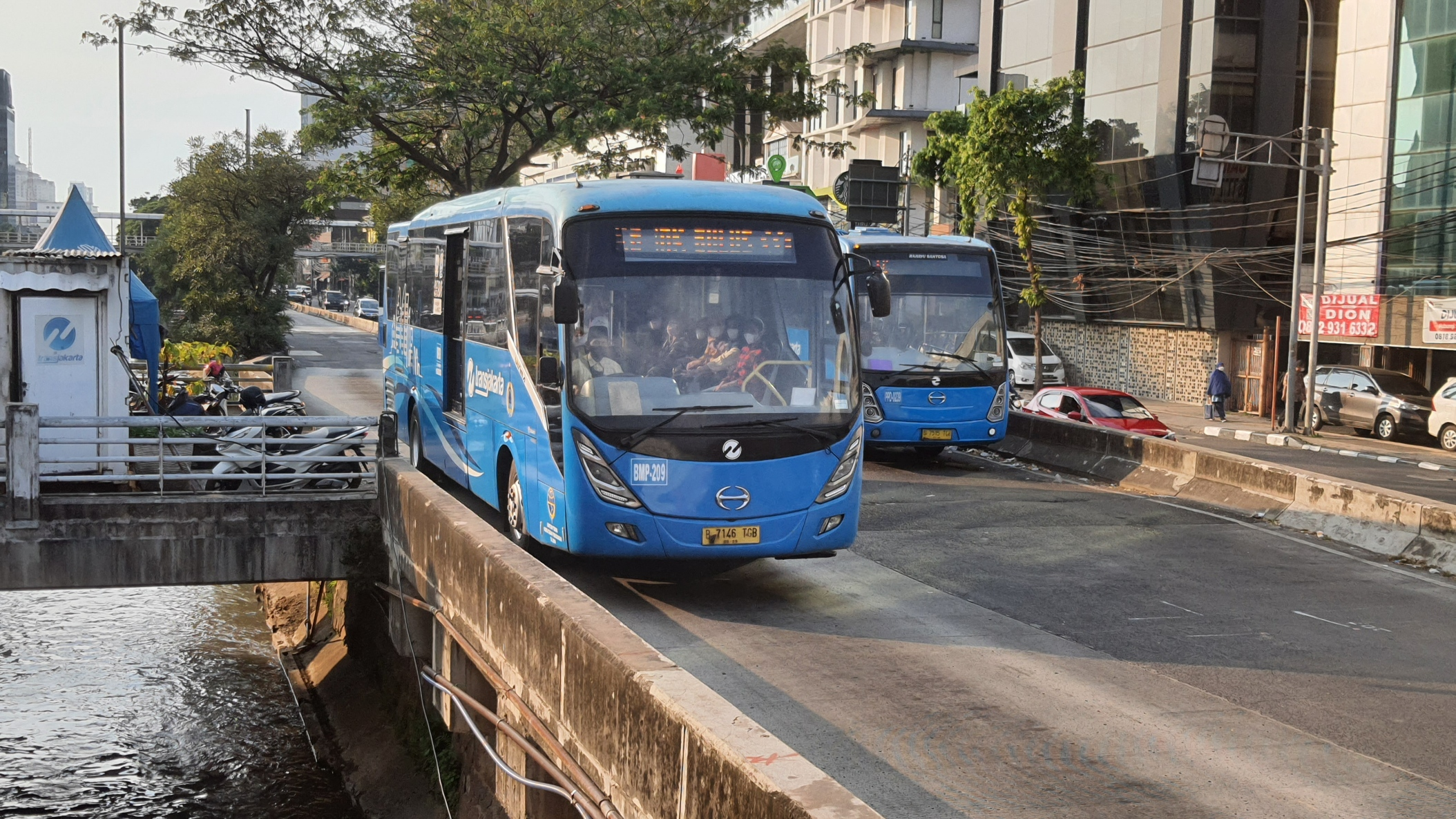
Corridor 8 bus fleet entering Harmoni, 2022
Current temporary buildings (2023-present)

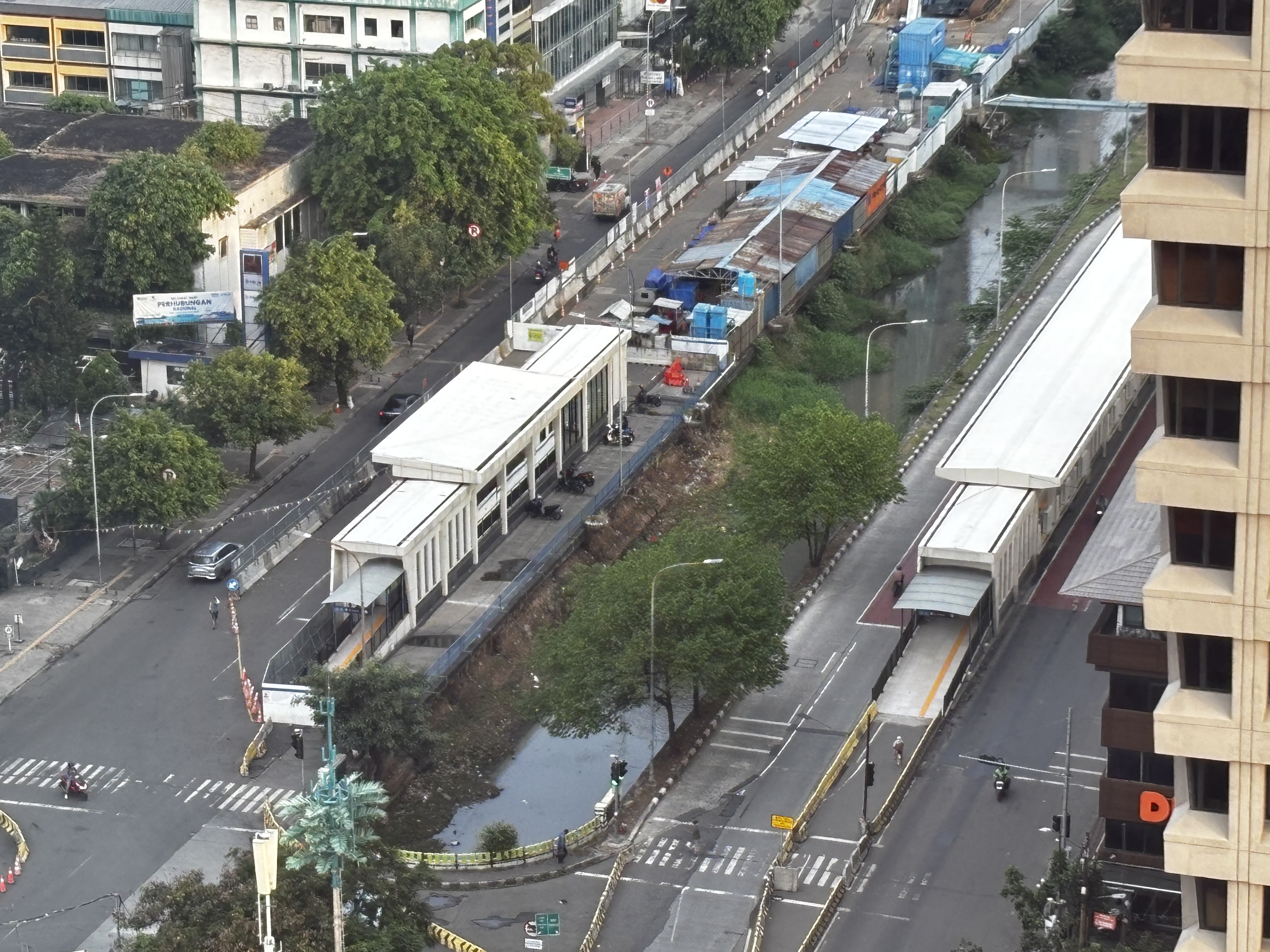
View from a building, 2025

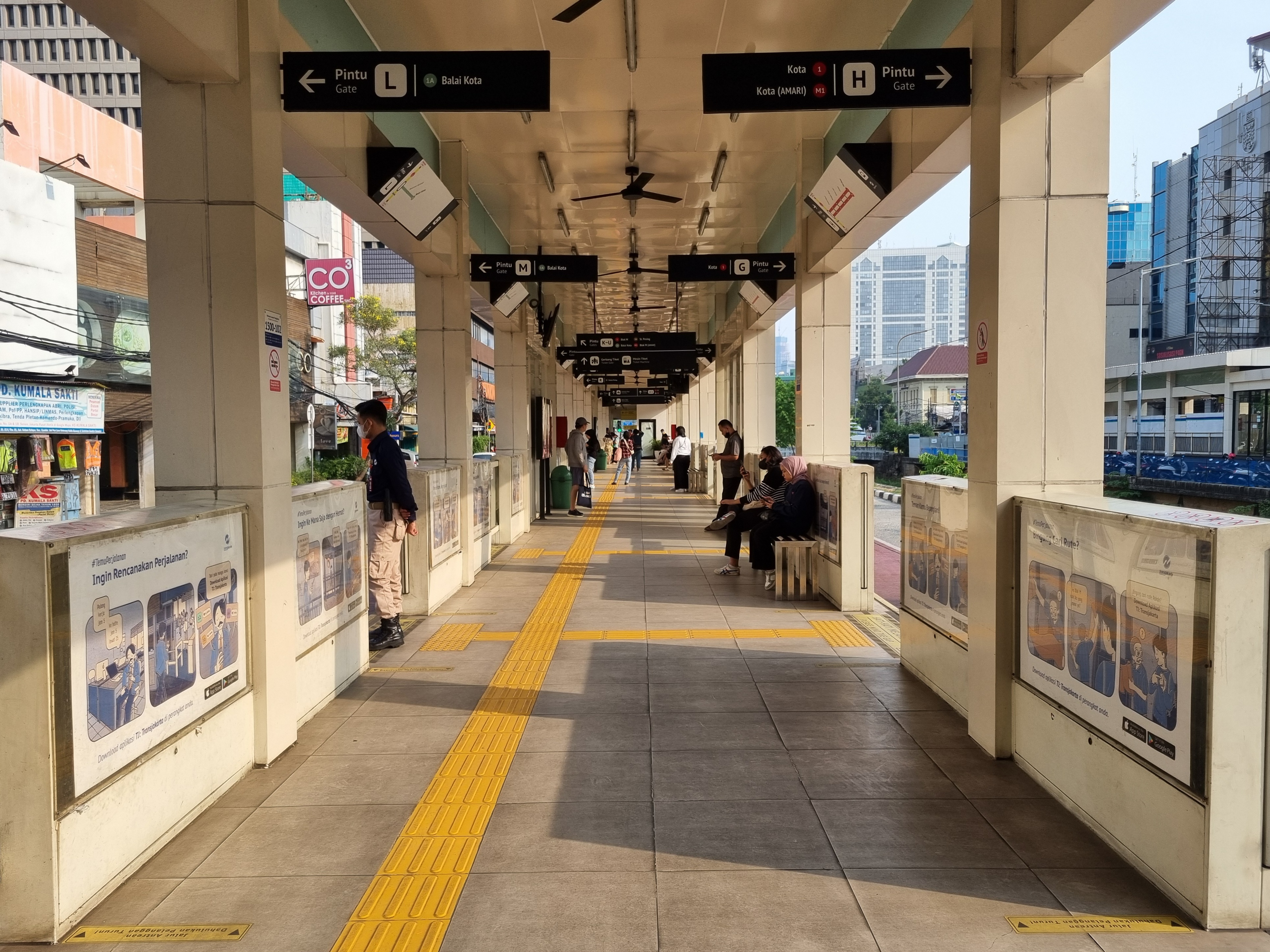
Inner view of the east building, 2024

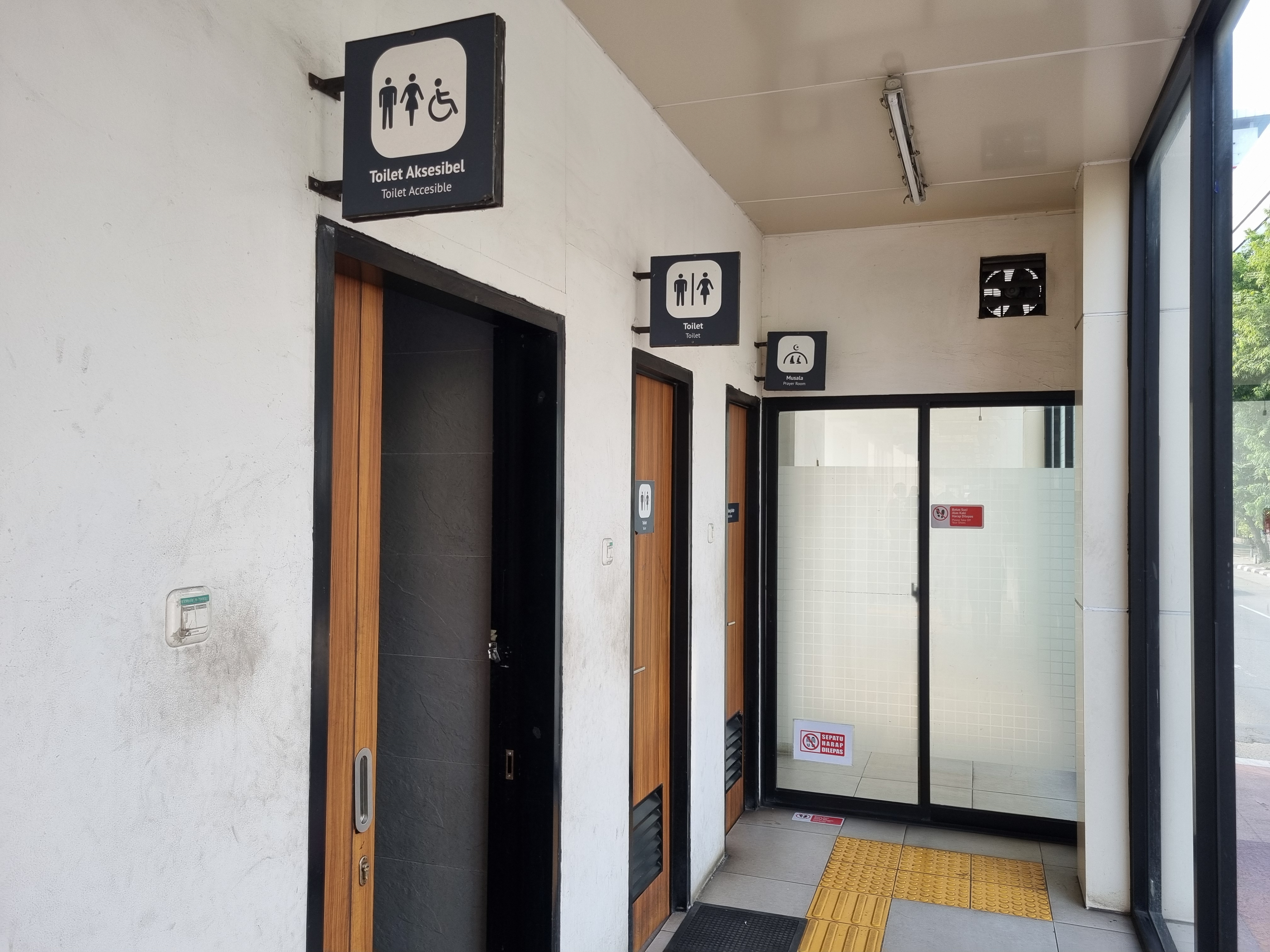
Toilet facilities and a prayer room, 2024

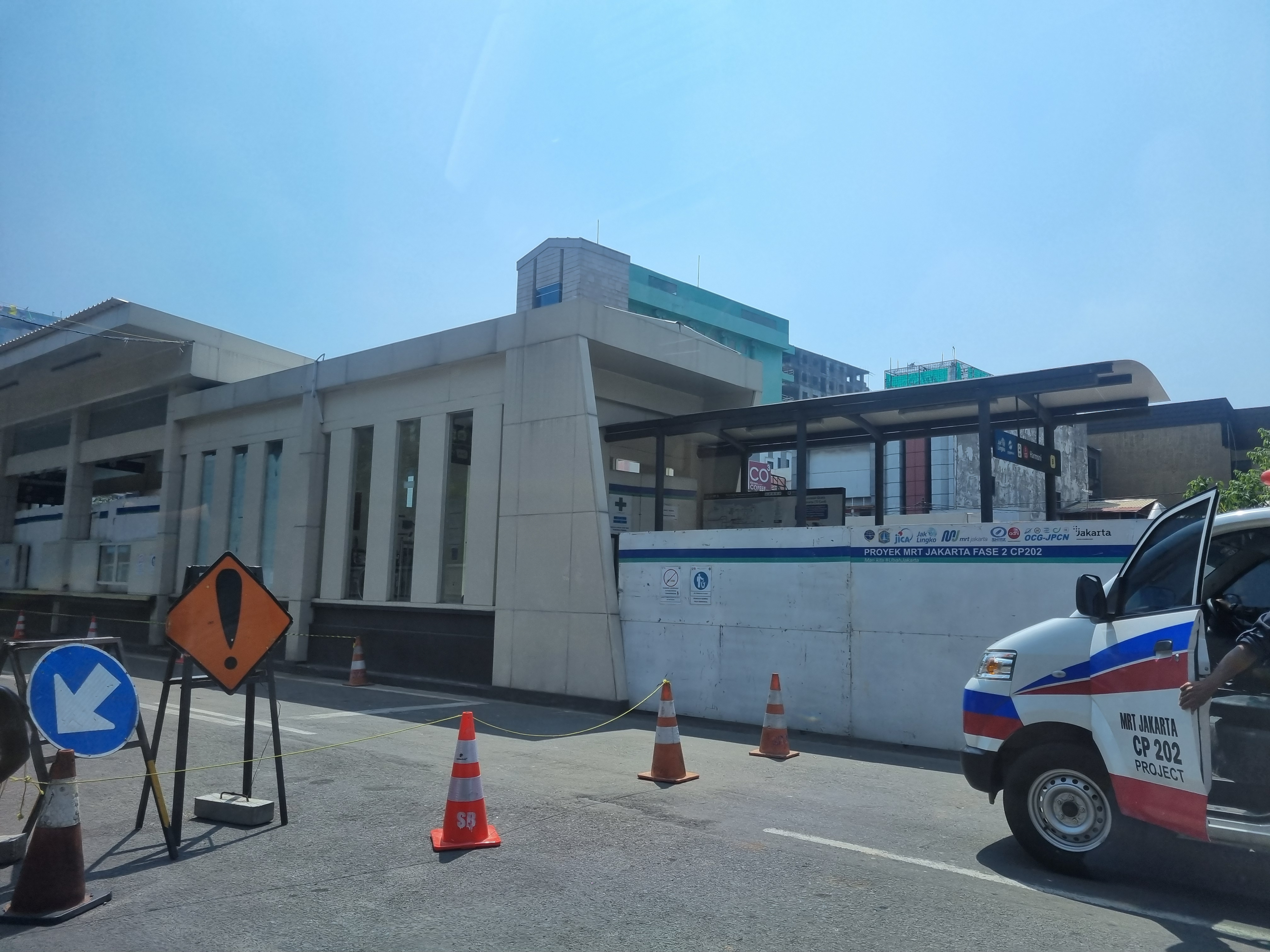
The currently inactive west building, 2024
