= Simpang Cempaka (Transjakarta) =

Bus station in Jakarta, Indonesia

10 08 Simpang Cempaka
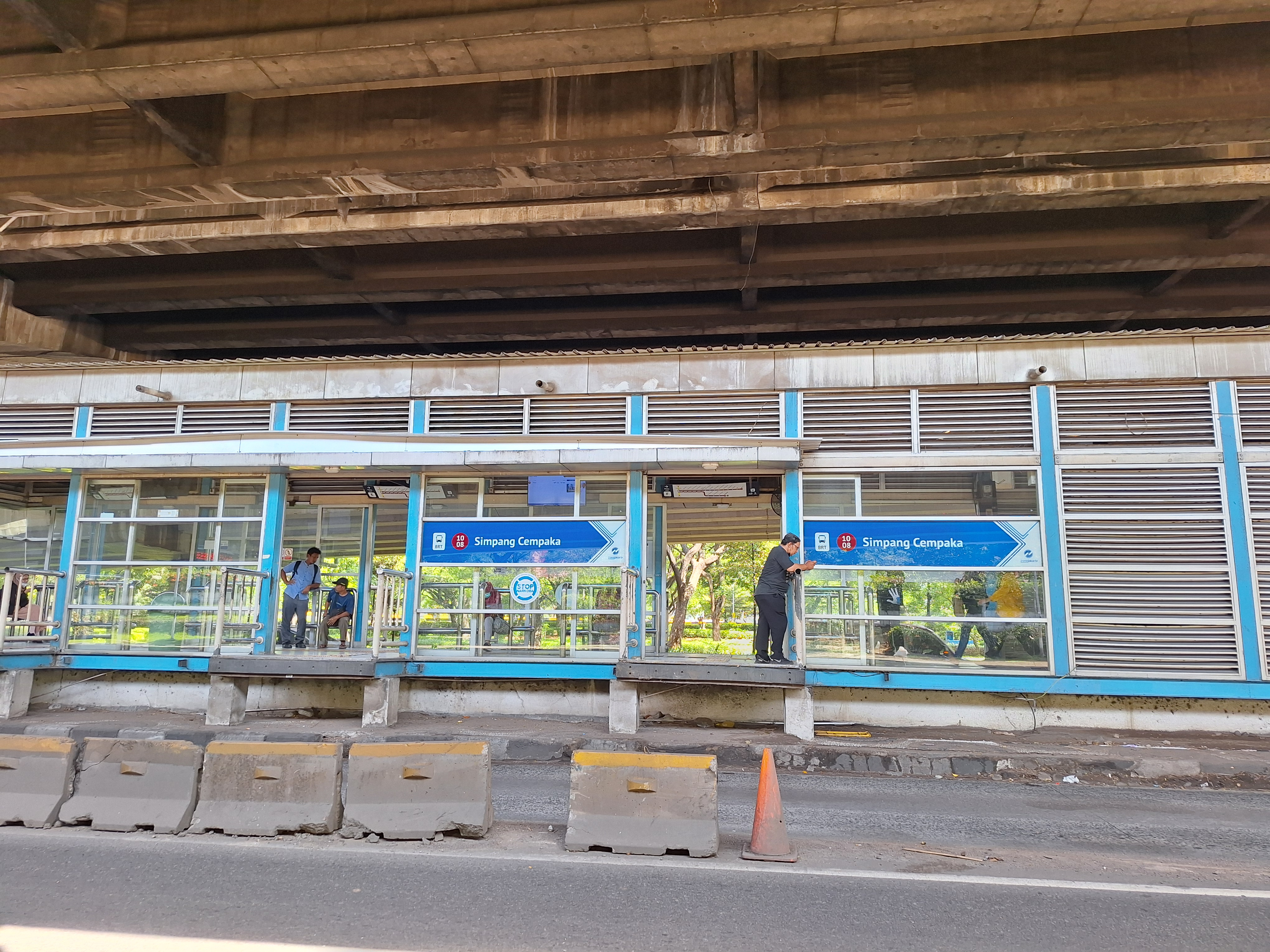

General information
- Location: Jenderal Ahmad Yani Street, Kelapa Gading Barat, Kelapa Gading, North Jakarta 14240, Indonesia
- Coordinates: 6.16585°S 106.879°E
- System: Transjakarta bus rapid transit station
- Owner: Transjakarta
- Operator: Transjakarta
- Lines: List of TransJakarta corridors#Corridor 10
- Platforms: Single island platform
- Connections: Cempaka Mas

Construction
- Structure type: At-grade
- Cycle facilities: No
- Accessible: No

Other information
- Status: In service

History
- Opened: 31 December 2010
- Former names: Cempaka Mas

Services
Preceding		Following
Kodamar towards Tanjung Priok	Corridor 10	Cempaka Putih towards PGC
Pedongkelan towards Pulo Gadung	Corridor 2 transfer at Cempaka Mas	Sumur Batu towards Monumen Nasional
Pedongkelan towards Pulo Gadung	Corridor 2 Route 2A transfer at Cempaka Mas	Sumur Batu towards Rawa Buaya
Cempaka Putih towards Kampung Rambutan	Corridor 7 Route 7F transfer at Cempaka Mas	Sumur Batu towards Juanda
Location

Simpang Cempaka is a Transjakarta bus rapid transit station located on Jenderal Ahmad Yani Street, Kelapa Gading Barat, Kelapa Gading, North Jakarta, Indonesia, serving Corridor 10. It is named after the junction it is located at (hence the name 'Simpang,' Indonesian for 'junction' or 'interchange'), across the street from ITC Cempaka Mas, and is connected to the Cempaka Mas station that serves Corridor 2.

== History ==
The station opened as Cempaka Mas (at the time the Corridor 2 station was named Cempaka Timur) alongside the rest of Corridor 10 on 31 December 2010. The station and its Corridor 2 counterpart were renamed in early 2024. The Corridor 2 station took the name 'Cempaka Mas', while this station was renamed Simpang Cempaka.

Since its opening, the station has been opened and closed numerous times due to flooding. One such incident occurred in early 2020.

== Building and layout ==
The station is medium-sized, but is smaller compared to its Corridor 2 counterpart. It has three gates on each side of the platform and lacks its own faregates, instead sharing one ticket concourse with the Corridor 2 station connected by a 480-metre-long skybridge. The skybridge is unique in the way that it is partially without roof as it is located beneath the eastern stretch of Jakarta Inner Ring Road.

West	towards Tanjung Priok (Kodamar) →
Island platform, doors open on the right hand side
East	← (Cempaka Putih) towards PGC

== Non-BRT bus services ==
Type	Route	Destination	Notes
Inner city feeder		Cibubur → Tanjung Priok	Inside the station
Mikrotrans Jak Lingko	JAK 61	ITC Cempaka Mas—Pulo Gadung Bus Terminal via Boulevard Barat Kelapa Gading	Outside the station

== Places of interest ==
- ITC Cempaka Mas

== Gallery ==
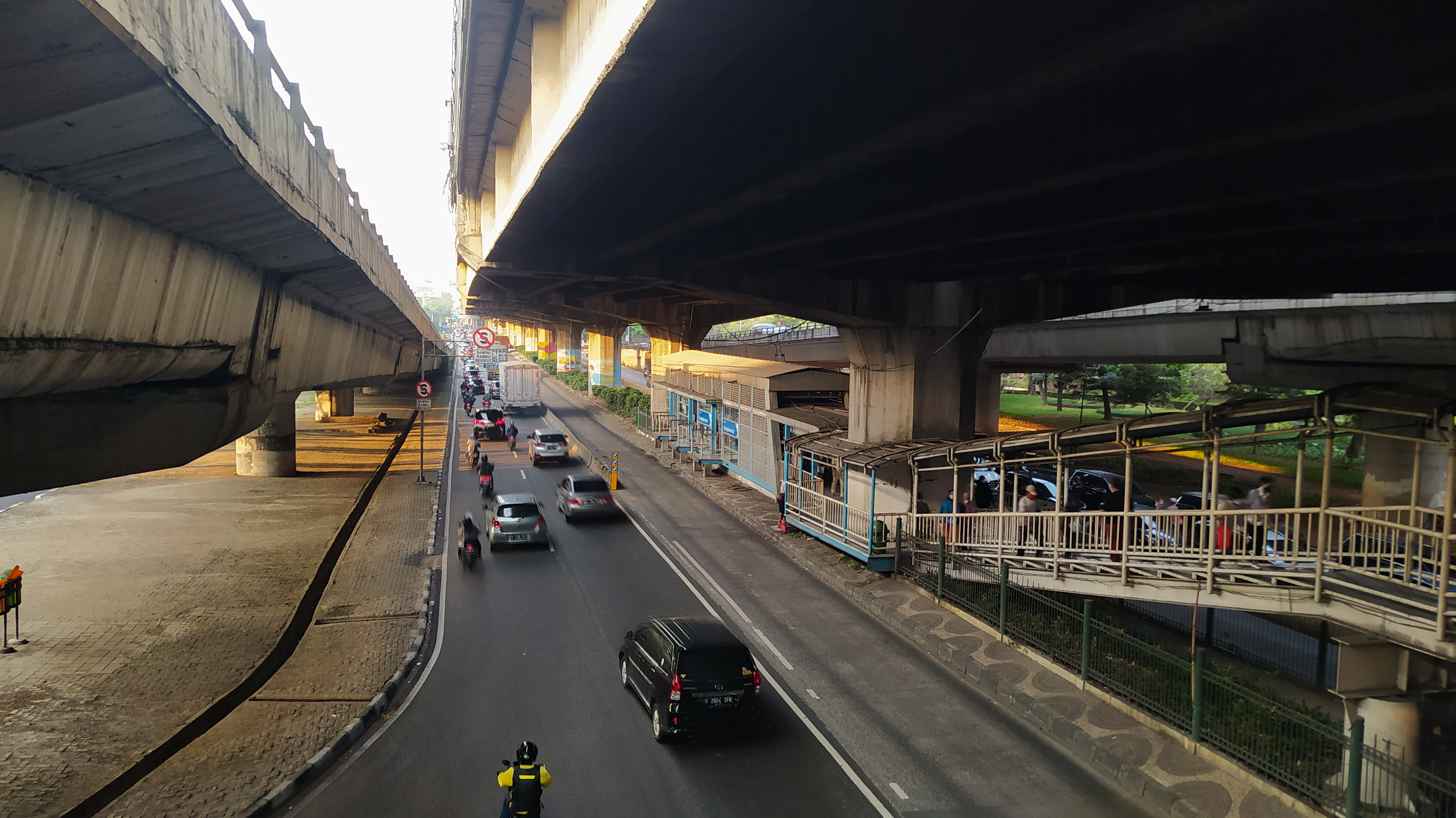
The station viewed from the transfer skybridge

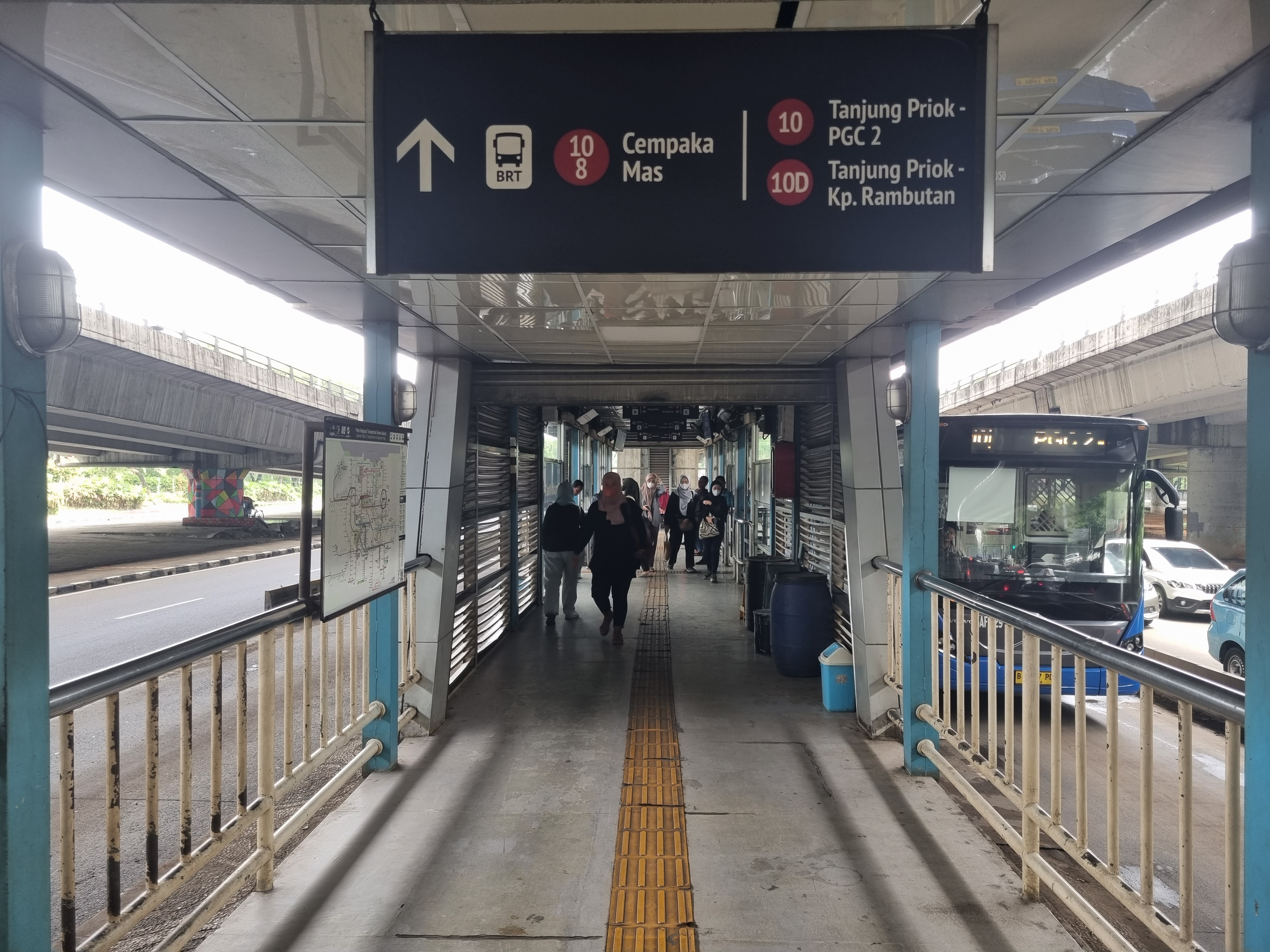
In front of the station, with the old station name.

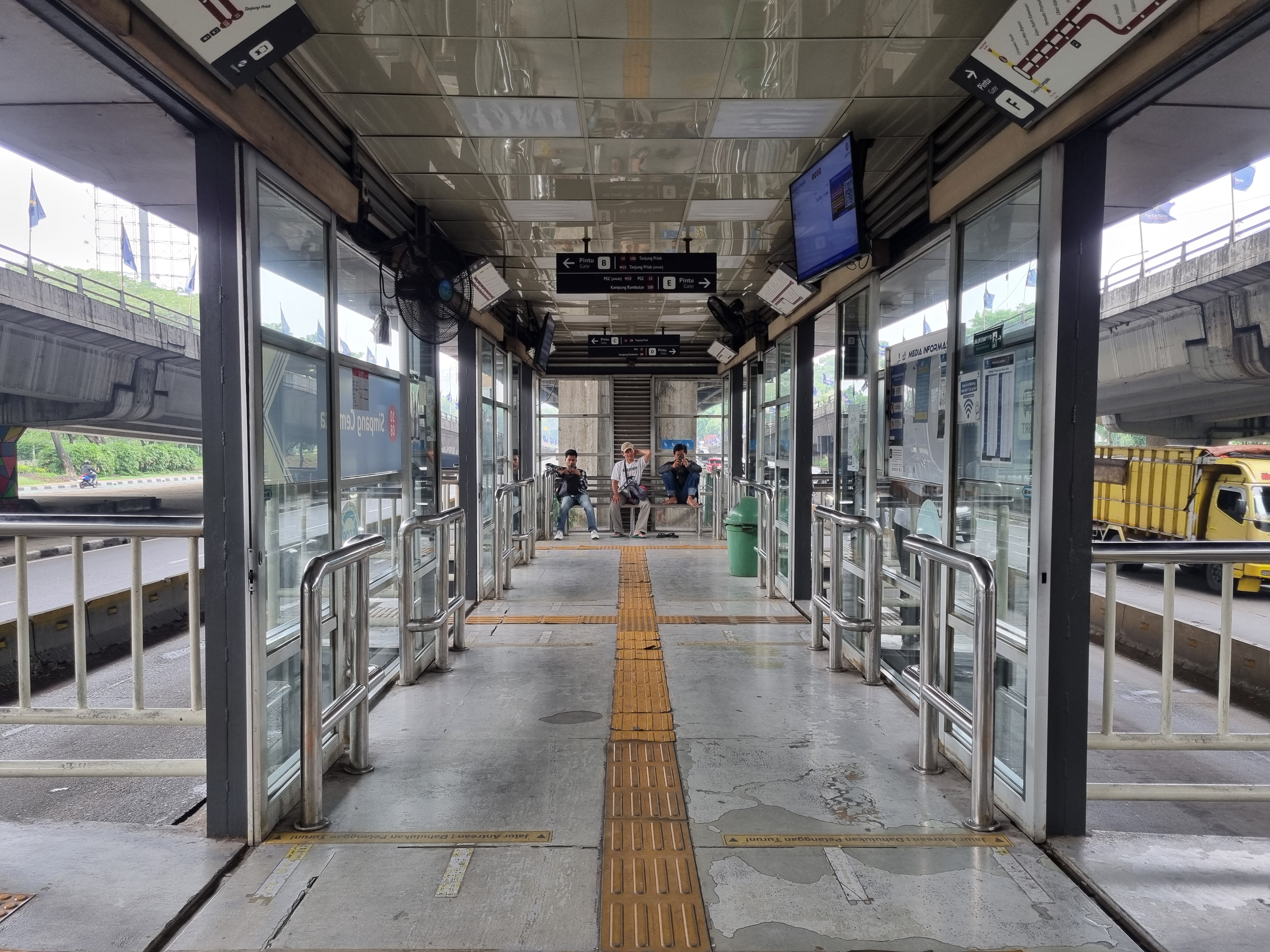
Platform area.

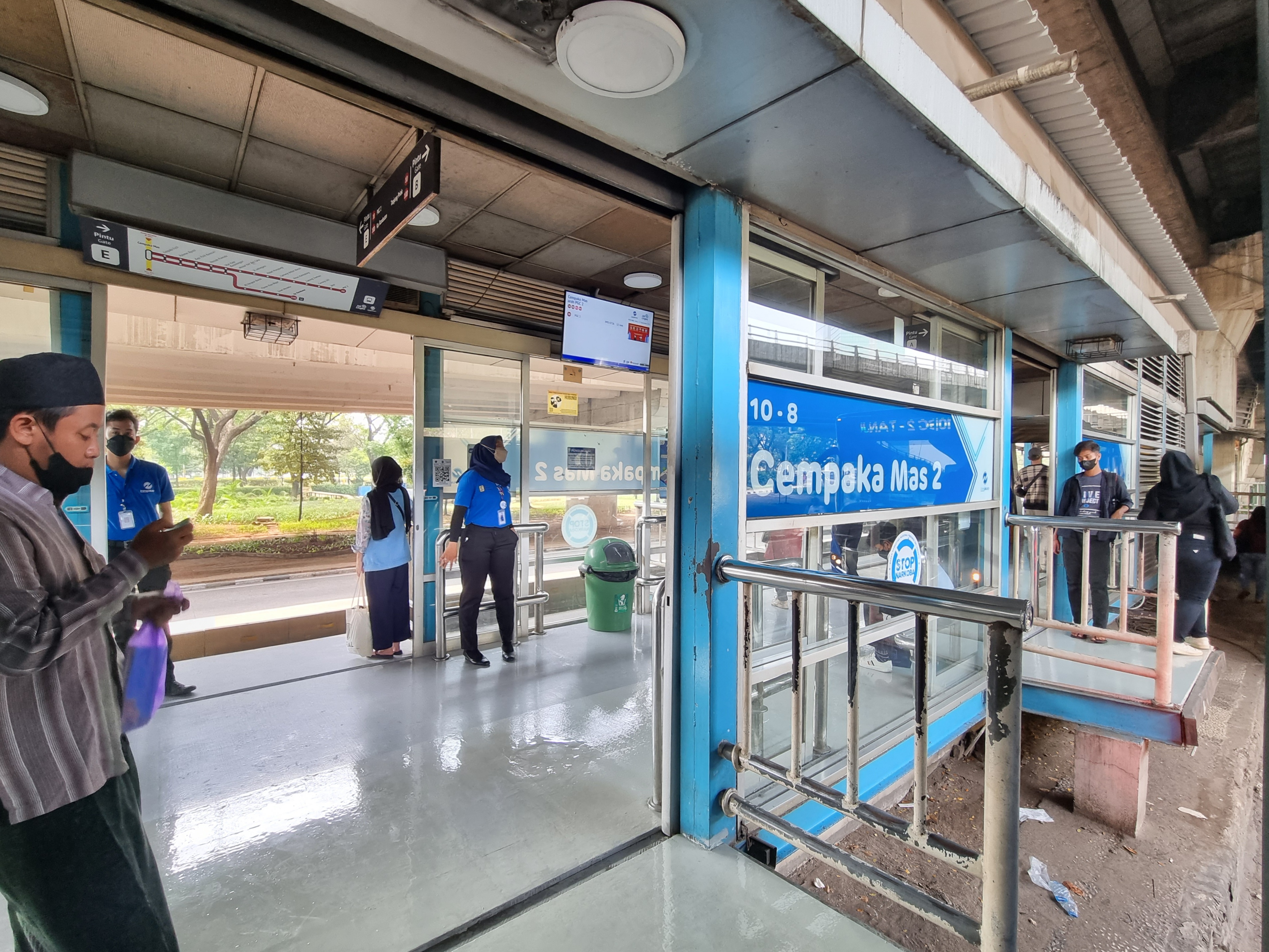
Western side of the platform for northbound buses

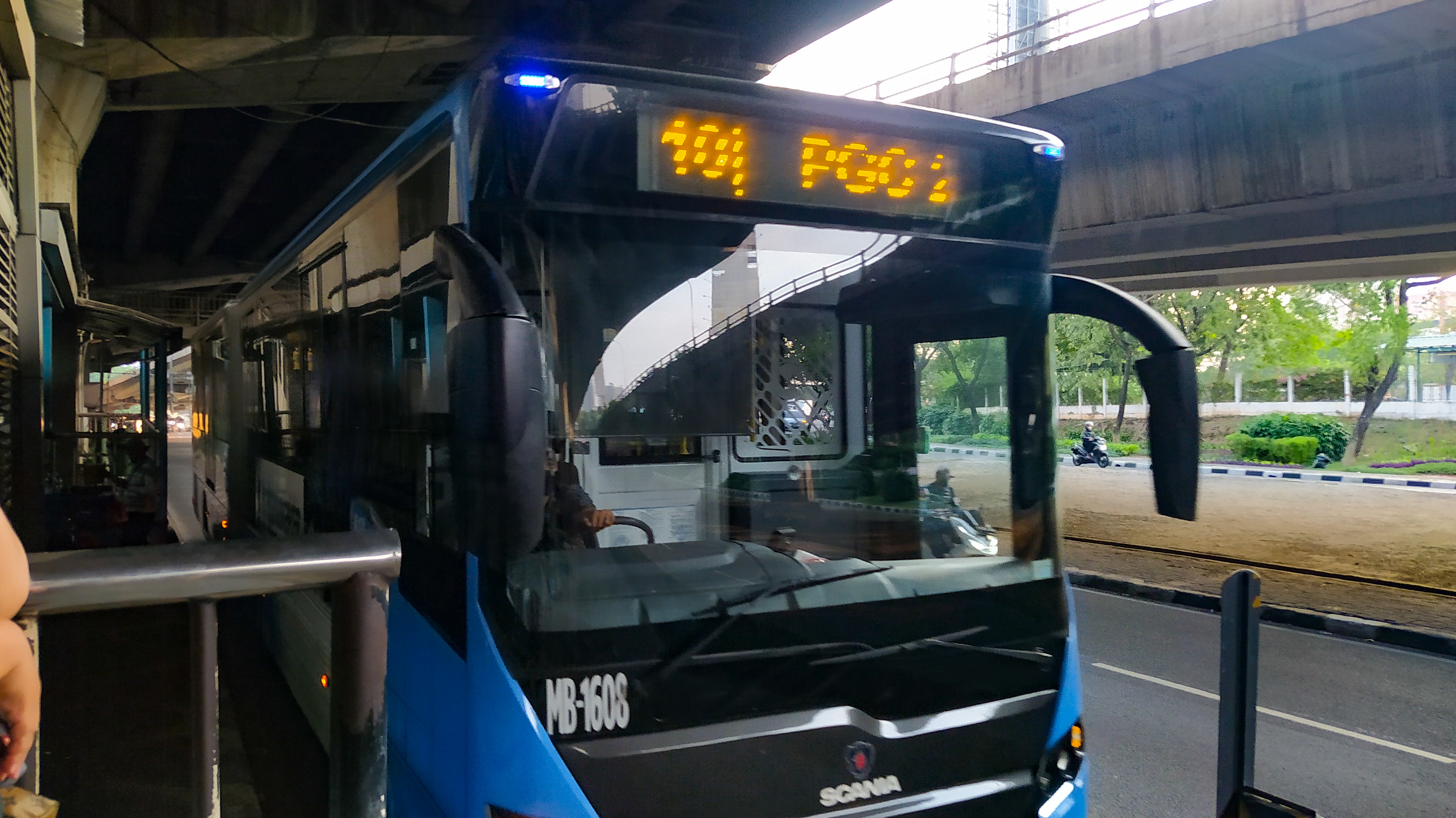
Corridor 10 bus stopping at the station
