= Cempaka Mas (Transjakarta) =

2 06 Cempaka Mas
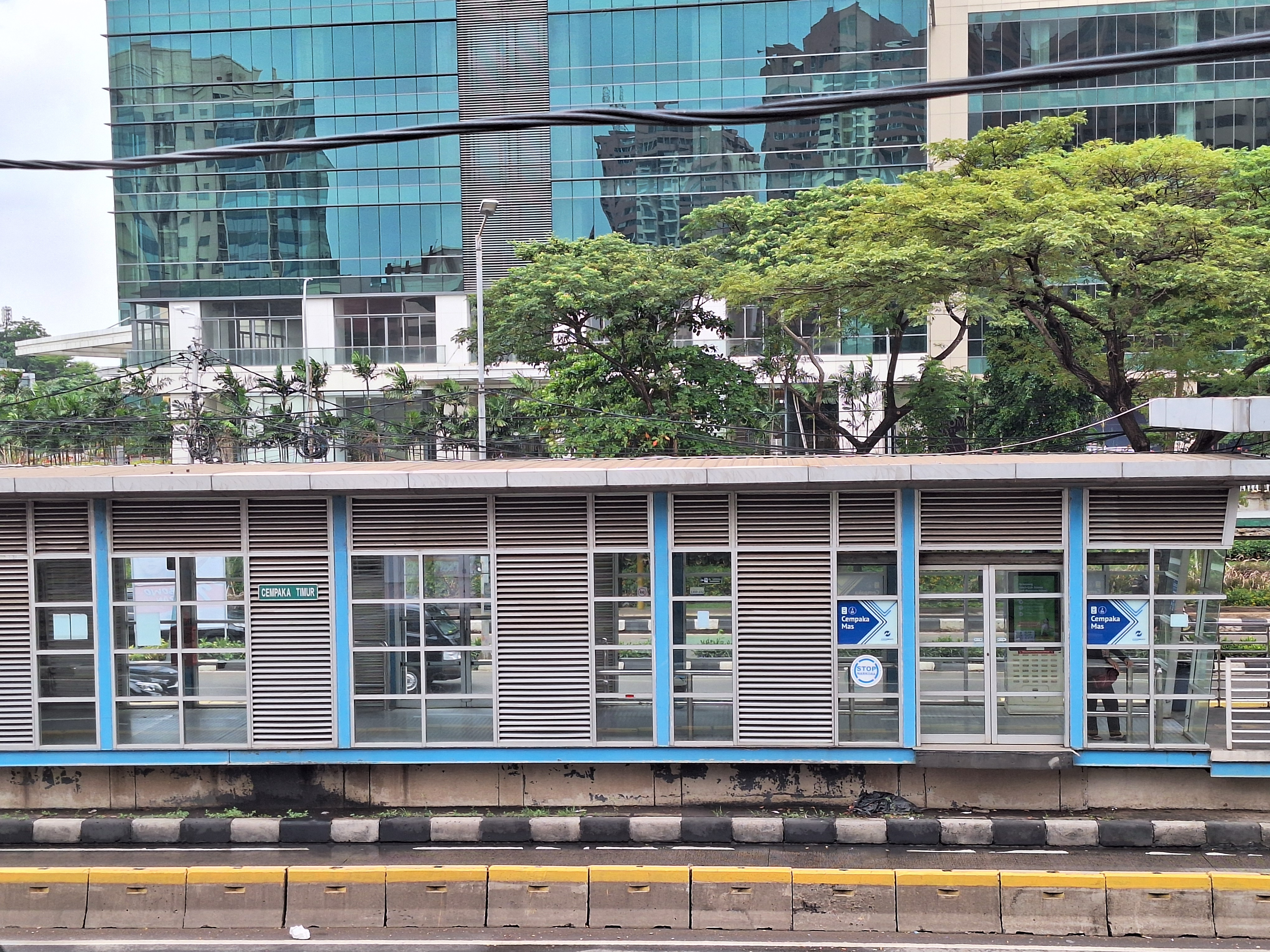
- Side view looking south

General information
- Location: Letjen Suprapto Street, Sumur Batu, Kemayoran, Kemayoran, Central Jakarta 10640, Indonesia
- Coordinates: 6.166518°S 106.876057°E
- System: Transjakarta bus rapid transit station
- Owner: Transjakarta
- Operator: Transjakarta
- Lines: List of Transjakarta corridors#Corridor 2 List of Transjakarta corridors#Cross-corridor routes List of TransJakarta corridors#Cross-corridor routes
- Platforms: Single island platform
- Connections: Simpang Cempaka

Construction
- Structure type: At-grade
- Cycle facilities: No
- Accessible: No

Other information
- Status: In service

History
- Opened: 15 January 2006
- Former names: Cempaka Timur

Services
Preceding		Following
Pedongkelan towards Pulo Gadung	Corridor 2	Sumur Batu towards Monumen Nasional
Pedongkelan towards Pulo Gadung	Corridor 2 Route 2A	Sumur Batu towards Rawa Buaya
Cempaka Putih One-way operation	Corridor 7 Route 7F	Sumur Batu towards Juanda
Kodamar towards Tanjung Priok	Corridor 10 transfer at Simpang Cempaka	Cempaka Putih towards PGC
Kodamar towards Tanjung Priok	Corridor 10 Route 10D transfer at Simpang Cempaka	Cempaka Putih towards Kampung Rambutan
Location

Cempaka Mas is a Transjakarta bus rapid transit station located on Letjen Suprapto Street, Sumur Batu, Kemayoran, Central Jakarta, Indonesia, serving Corridor 2. The station is connected to the Simpang Cempaka station that serves Corridor 10. It is the easternmost BRT station in Central Jakarta.

The station first opened as Cempaka Timur on 15 January 2006, on the opening day of Corridor 2. In early January 2024, it was renamed to Cempaka Mas.

== Building and layout ==
Cempaka Mas BRT station has eight platform bays (three at north for eastbound buses, and four at south for westbound buses). Its connection bridge to the Simpang Cempaka station has a total length of around 480 metres (1,570 ft).

North	towards Pulo Gadung (Pedongkelan) →
Island platform, doors open on the right side
South	← (Sumur Batu) towards Monumen Nasional, towards Rawa Buaya, and towards Juanda

== Non-BRT bus services ==
Service type	Route	Destination	Notes
Jakarta Fair feeder		Pulo Gadung—JIEXPO Kemayoran	Only operates during the Jakarta Fair and/or other events at JIEXPO Kemayoran. Insise the station
Mikrotrans Jak Lingko	JAK 61	Cempaka Putih—Pulo Gadung via Kelapa Gading	Outside the station

== Places of interest ==
- ITC Cempaka Mas
- Ria Rio Reservoir Park

== Incident ==
On 23 February 2020, then-named Cempaka Timur BRT station was closed for passenger service on 23 February 2020 due to severe flooding, alongside others on the tail stretch of Corridor 2.

== Gallery ==
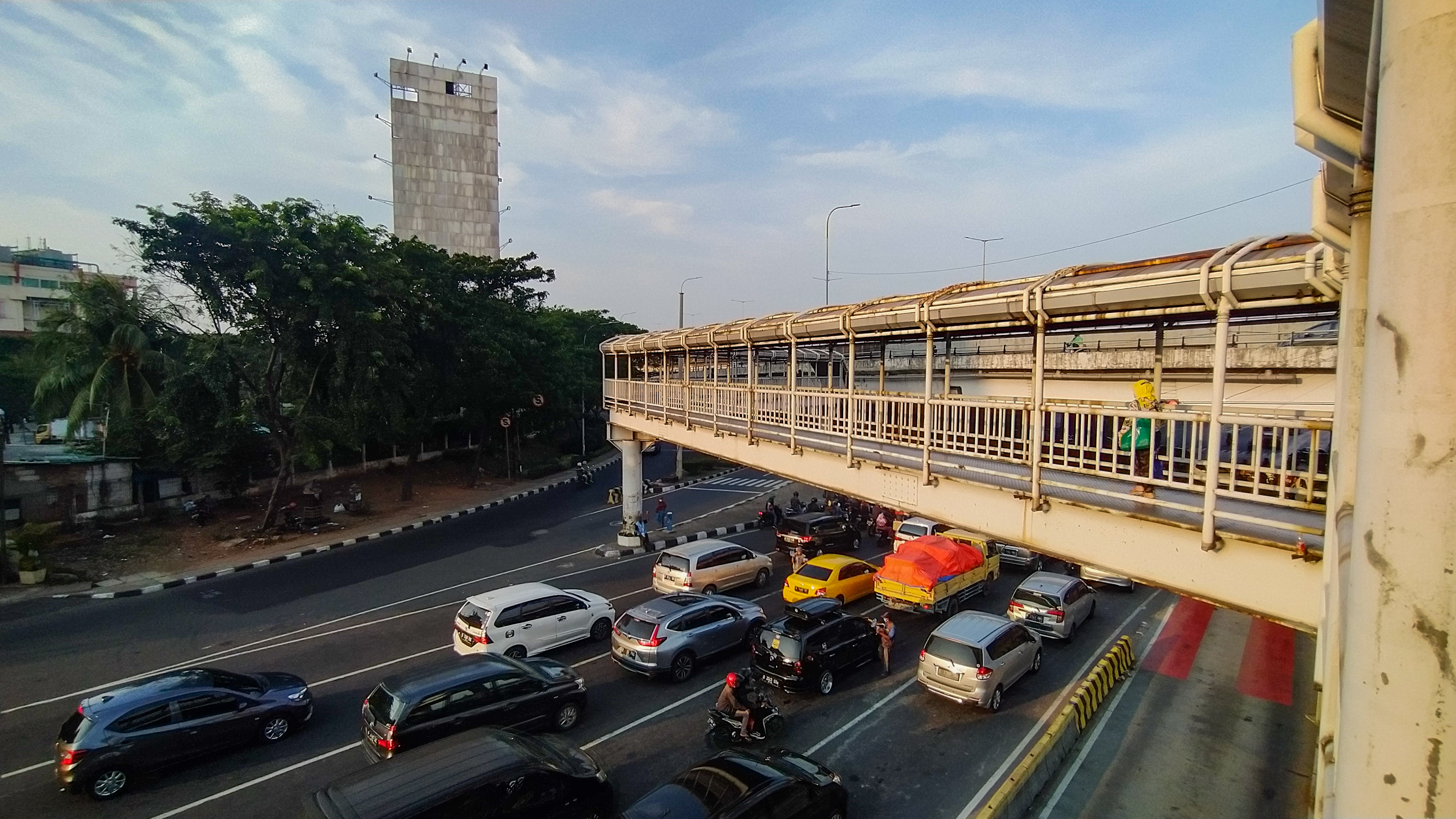
The transfer bridge between Cempaka Timur and Simpang Cempaka stations

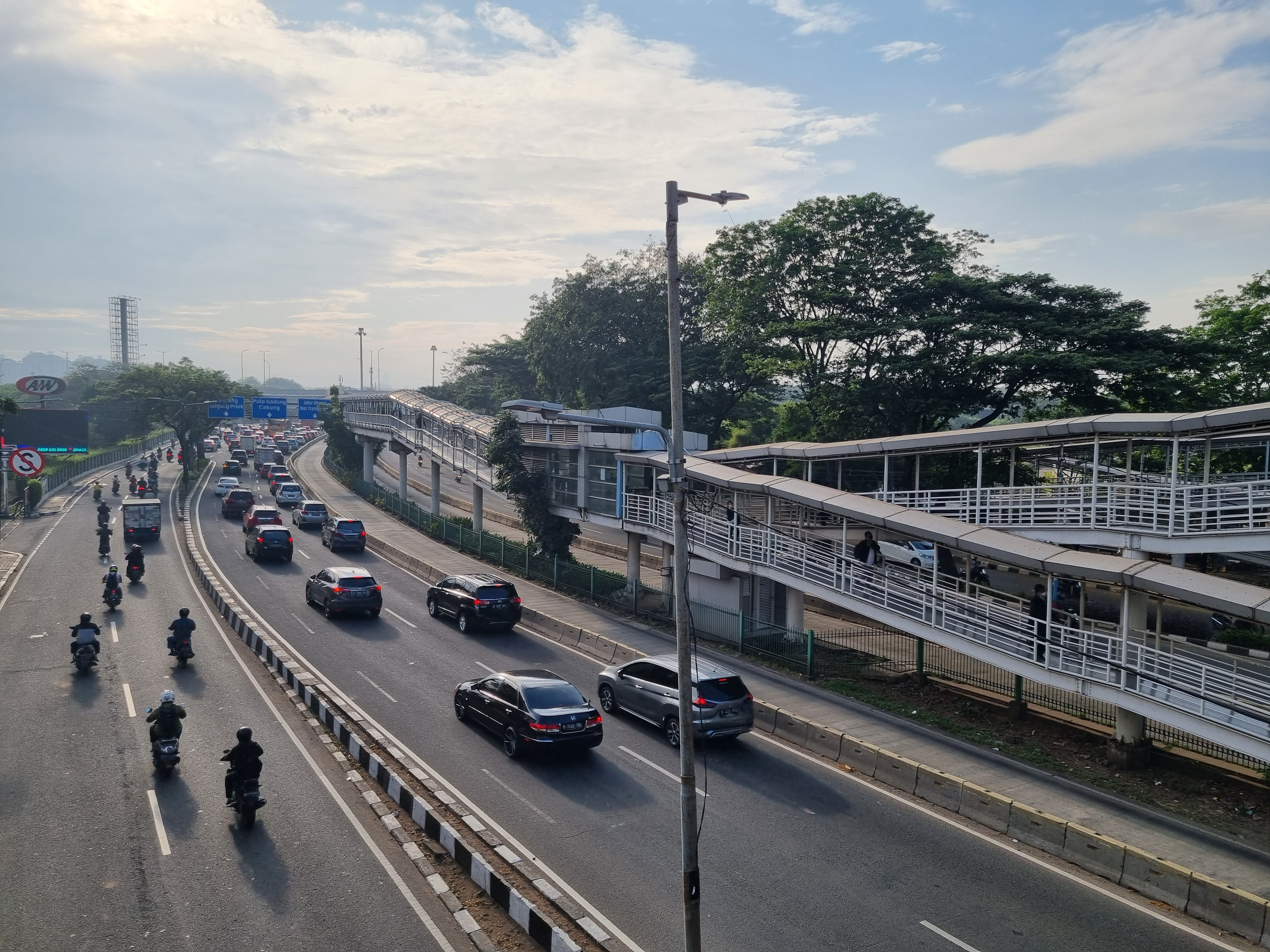
Concourse building at the transfer bridge to Simpang Cempaka station

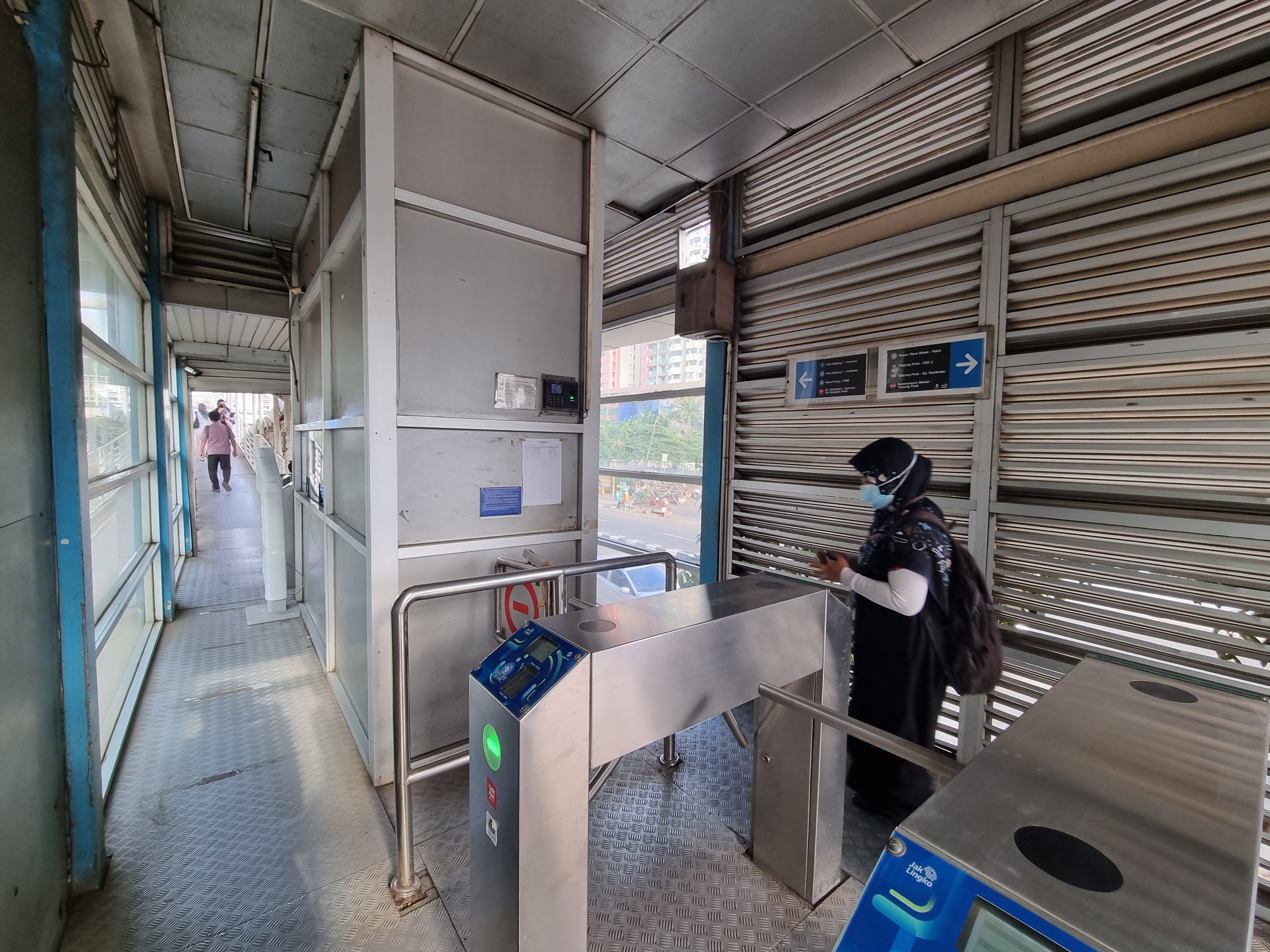
Turnstiles at the concourse

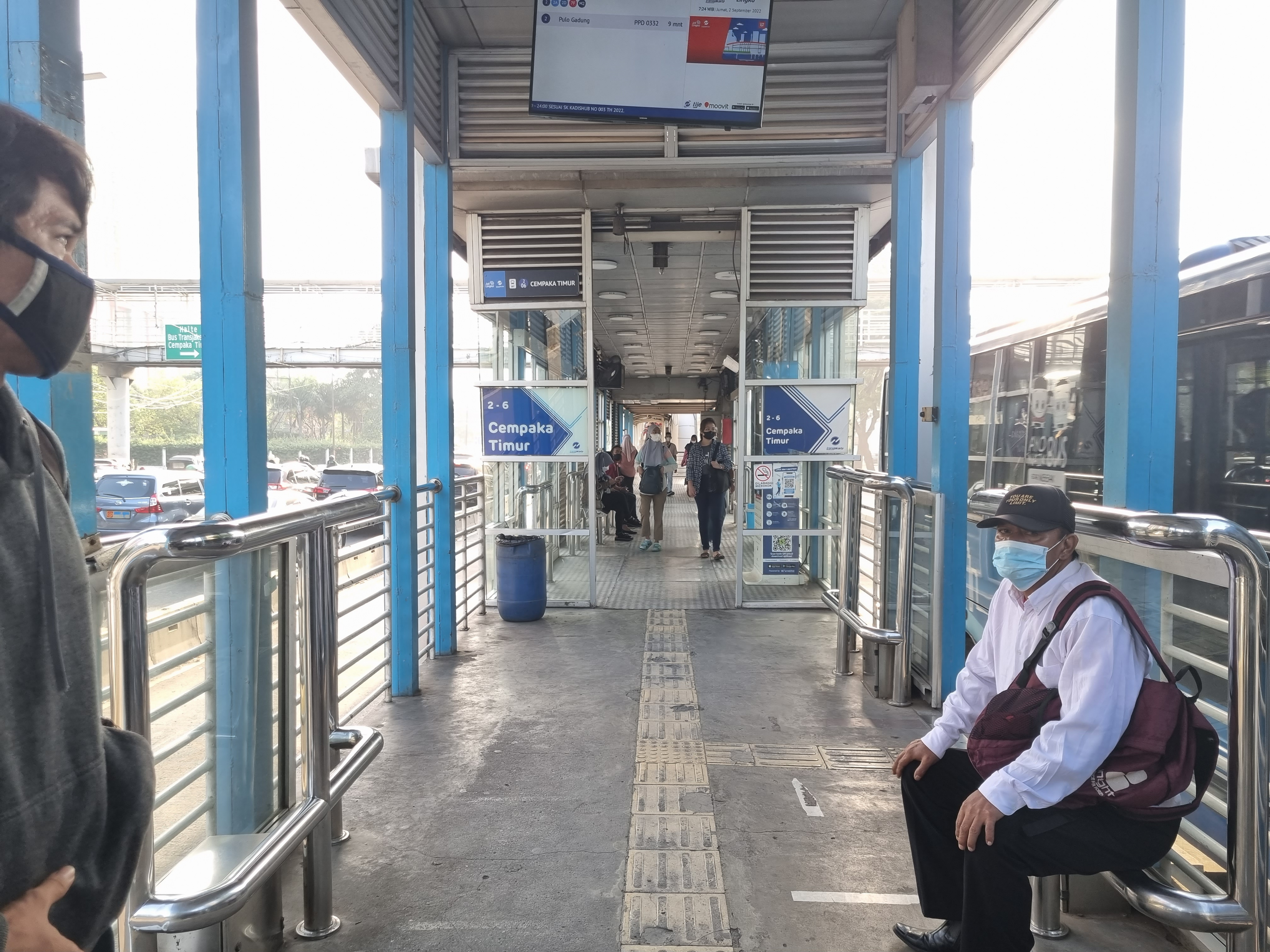
The platform area

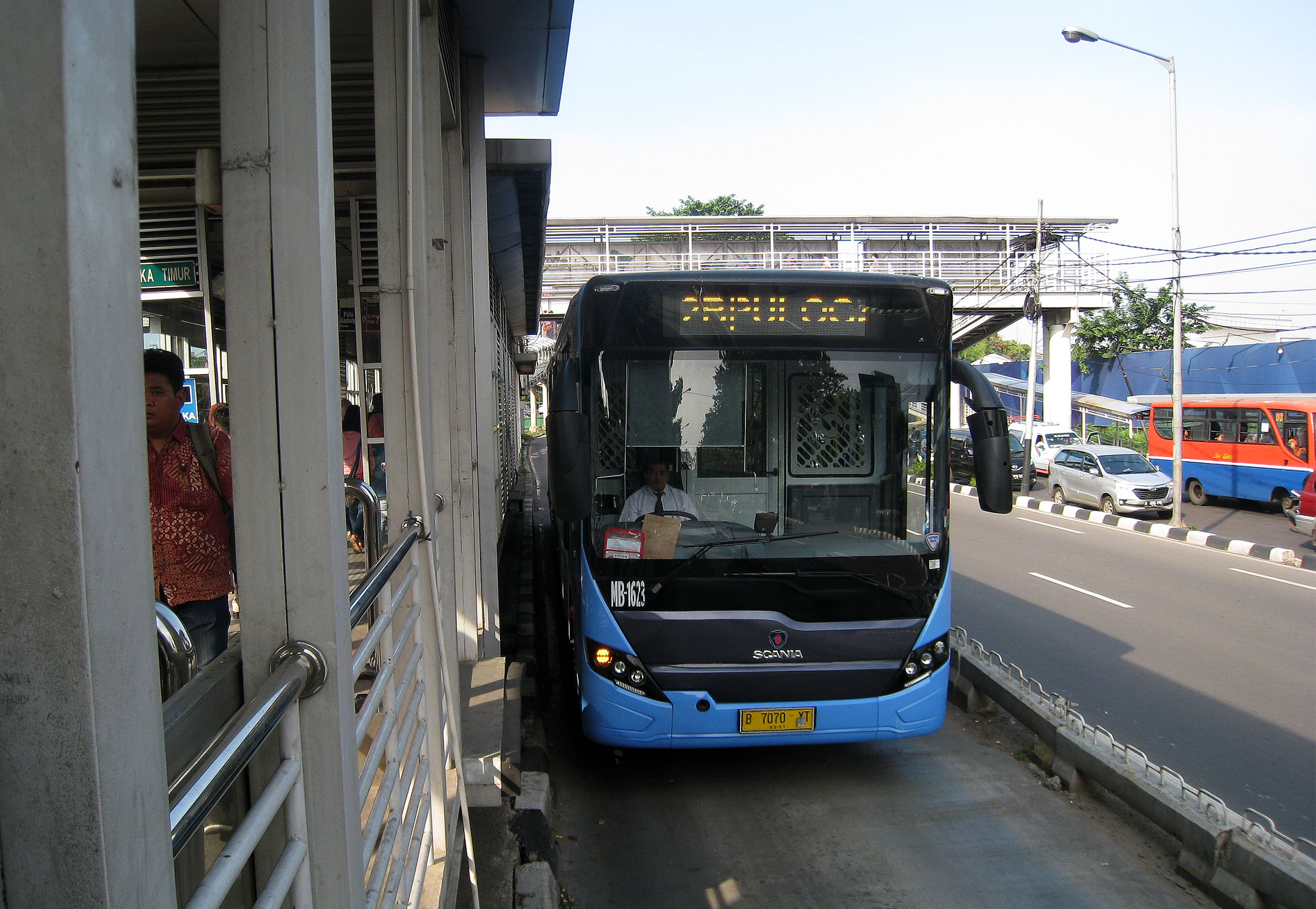
Scania K3210A bus arriving at the station
