= Transjakarta Corridor 10 =

Bus rapid transit route in Indonesia

- Tanjung Priok – PGC
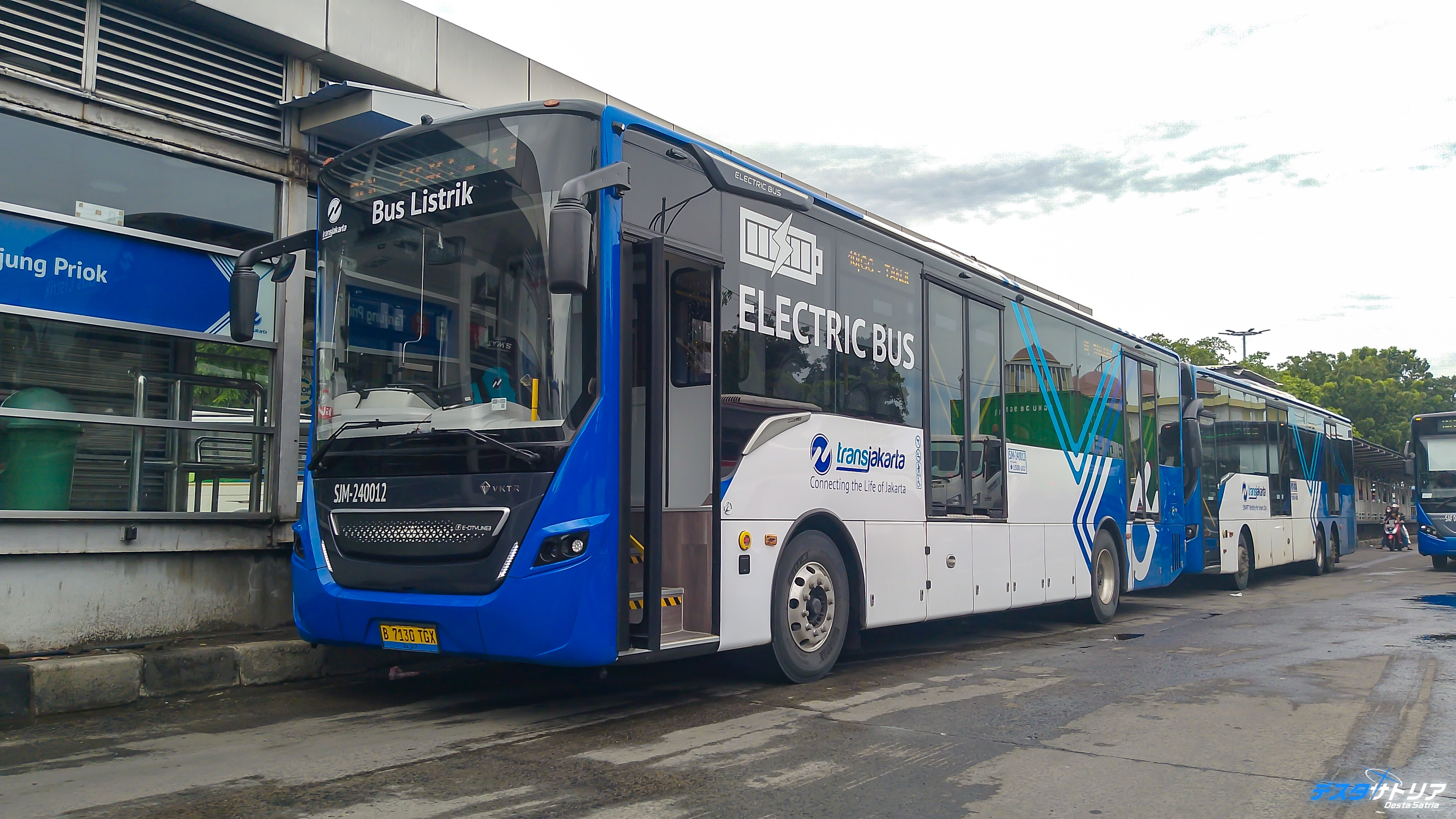
- The BYD D9 electric bus fleet of Corridor 10 at Tanjung Priok BRT station

Overview
- System: Transjakarta
- Operator: PT. Transportasi Jakarta (TJ, infrastructure and staffs); Perum DAMRI (DMR, fleets and drivers); Mayasari Bakti (MB/MYS, fleets and drivers); Sinar Jaya (SJM, fleets and drivers); Steady Safe (SAF, fleets and drivers)
- Began service: 31 December 2010

Route
- Route type: Street-level Bus Rapid Transit
- Locale: Central Jakarta; East Jakarta; North Jakarta
- Length: 19.4 km
- Stations: 22

Transjakarta Corridor 10 is a bus rapid transit corridor in Jakarta, Indonesia, operated by Transjakarta. It connects the Tanjung Priok bus terminal in North Jakarta to the Pusat Grosir Cililitan (PGC) mall in East Jakarta. The streets traversed by Corridor 10 are along Enggano, Yos Sudarso, Jenderal Ahmad Yani, Mayjen DI Panjaitan and Mayjen Sutoyo streets (the latter four are parts of the Jakarta Bypass). Much of this corridor's route runs parallel to and beneath the elevated Cawang–Tanjung Priok segment of the Jakarta Inner Ring Road (Ir. Wiyoto Wiyono Expressway). Corridor 10 is integrated with the KRL Commuterline Cikarang Loop Line service at Jatinegara Station via Flyover Jatinegara BRT station and the Tanjung Priok Line at the Tanjung Priuk railway station.

Corridor 10 began its service along with Corridor 9 on 31 December 2010 to support the 2011 Southeast Asian Games. It is the successor of PPD 43 city bus route.

== List of BRT stations ==
- Currently, all stations are served by buses 24 hours a day.
- Italic text indicates that the BRT station is temporarily closed for revitalisation works or the bus does not stop at the station.

Corridor 10 (Tanjung Priok – PGC)
Code	Station name	Transfer/Notes	Bus terminal or train station nearby
Stations in order: From top to bottom (downwards) towards PGC (→); from bottom to top (upwards) towards Tanjung Priok (←)
10 01 12 22	Tanjung Priok	Two separate buildings for opposing directions require exiting paid area to transfer: Part 1: Arrivals only; Part 2: Towards PGC (→)	Tanjung Priok Tanjung Priok Bus Terminal
10 01 12 22	Tanjung Priok	Tanjung Priok	Tanjung Priok Tanjung Priok Bus Terminal
10 02 12 21	Mambo	Mambo	
10 03 12 20	Koja	Koja	
10 04 12 19	Walikota Jakarta Utara	Two separate buildings for opposing directions require exiting paid area to transfer: Northbound: Towards Tanjung Priok (←); Southbound: Towards PGC (→)	
10 04 12 19	Walikota Jakarta Utara	Walikota Jakarta Utara	
10 05 12 18	Plumpang	Plumpang	
10 06 12 17	Sunter Kelapa Gading	Sunter Kelapa Gading	Boulevard Gading (Planned)
10 07	Kodamar		
10 08	Simpang Cempaka	Simpang Cempaka Cempaka Mas (via skybridge)	
10 09	Cempaka Putih	Cempaka Putih	
10 10	Pulo Mas Bypass	Pulo Mas Bypass	
10 11	Kayu Putih Rawasari	Kayu Putih Rawasari	
10 12	Pemuda Pramuka	Pemuda Pramuka Simpang Pramuka (via skybridge, temporarily westbound only)	Pramuka (U/C)
10 13	Utan Kayu Rawamangun	Utan Kayu Rawamangun	
10 14	Pisangan		
10 15 11 13	Flyover Jatinegara	Flyover Jatinegara (via skybridge)	Jatinegara
10 16	Pedati Prumpung		
10 17	Kebon Nanas		
10 18	Halim		
10 19	Simpang Cawang	Simpang Cawang	
10 20 7 09 9 03	Cawang Sentral	Cawang Sentral	
10 21 7 08	Cawang Cililitan	Cawang Cililitan	
10 22	PGC	Two separate buildings for opposing directions require exiting paid area to transfer: Part 1: Arrivals only; Part 2: Towards Tanjung Priok (←)	Cililitan Bus Terminal Cililitan (transfer outside paid area)

== Cross-corridor route ==
=== Route 10H (Tanjung Priok – Bundaran Senayan) ===
- Italic text indicates that the BRT station is temporarily closed for revitalisation works or the bus does not stop at the station.

Route 10H (Tanjung Priok – Bundaran Senayan)
Code	Station name	Transfer/Notes	Bus terminal or train station nearby
Stations in order: From top to bottom (downwards) towards Bundaran Senayan (→); from bottom to top (upwards) towards Tanjung Priok (←)
10 01 12 22	Tanjung Priok	Two separate buildings for opposing directions require exiting paid area to transfer: Part 1: Arrivals only; Part 2: Towards Bundaran Senayan (→)	Tanjung Priuk Tanjung Priok Bus Terminal
10 01 12 22	Tanjung Priok	Tanjung Priok	Tanjung Priuk Tanjung Priok Bus Terminal
5 02	Pademangan	Pademangan	
5 03 12 09	Gunung Sahari	Gunung Sahari	
5 04 12 10	Jembatan Merah	Jembatan Merah	Rajawali (Planned)
5 05	Pasar Baru Timur	Pasar Baru Timur	
2 18 3 15	Juanda	Juanda	Juanda
2 19 3 14	Pecenongan	Pecenongan	
8 23	Petojo	Petojo	
8 22	Tarakan	Tarakan	Petojo (planned)
8 21	Tomang Raya	Tomang Raya	
9 18	Kota Bambu	Two separate buildings for opposing directions require exiting paid area to transfer: Northbound: Towards Tanjung Priok (←); Southbound: Towards Bundaran Senayan (→)	
9 18	Kota Bambu	Kota Bambu	
9 17	Kemanggisan	Two separate buildings for opposing directions require exiting paid area to transfer: Northbound: Towards Tanjung Priok (←); Southbound: Towards Bundaran Senayan (→)	
9 17	Kemanggisan	Kemanggisan	
9 16	Petamburan	Petamburan	
9 15	Gerbang Pemuda	Two separate buildings for opposing directions require exiting paid area to transfer: Eastbound: Towards Bundaran Senayan (→); Westbound: Towards Tanjung Priok (←)	
9 15	Gerbang Pemuda	Gerbang Pemuda	
1 05	Senayan Bank Jakarta	Senayan Bank Jakarta	
1 04	Bundaran Senayan	Bundaran Senayan	Senayan Mastercard

== Fleets ==
Information correct as of May 2026

=== (Tanjung Priok – PGC) ===
Operator	Type	Caption	Image	Depot
Main BRT fleet
Sinar Jaya	BYD D9	Operates every day(05:00–22:00 WIB)		Cakung
Perum DAMRI	Skywell NJL6126BEV	Operates every day(05:00–22:00 WIB)		Cakung
Perum DAMRI	Zhongtong Bus LCK6180GC	Operates every day(05:00–22:00 WIB)		Klender
Mayasari Bakti	Scania K320IA	Operates every day(05:00–22:00 WIB)		Klender
Steady Safe	Volvo B11R	Operates every day(05:00–22:00 WIB)		Pegangsaan Dua
Bianglala Metropolitan	Mercedes-Benz OH 1626	Operates on night bus		Ciputat (South Tangerang City, Banten)
Reserve BRT fleet
Swakelola Transjakarta	Mercedes-Benz OC 500	Operates on weekdays (05:00–22:00 WIB)		Cawang
Mayasari Bakti	Scania K310IB	Operates on weekdays (05:00–22:00 WIB)		Klender

=== (Tanjung Priok – Bundaran Senayan) ===
Operator	Type	Caption	Image	Depot
Main BRT fleet
Steady Safe	Volvo B11R	Operates every day (05:00–22:00 WIB)		Klender
Steady Safe	Volvo B11R	Operates every day (05:00–22:00 WIB)		Pegangsaan Dua
Reserve BRT fleet
Mayasari Bakti	Scania K310IB	Operates on weekdays (05:00–22:00 WIB)		Klender

== See also ==
- Transjakarta
  - List of Transjakarta corridors
