= Transjakarta Corridor 2 =

Bus rapid transit route in Indonesia

- Pulo Gadung – Monumen Nasional
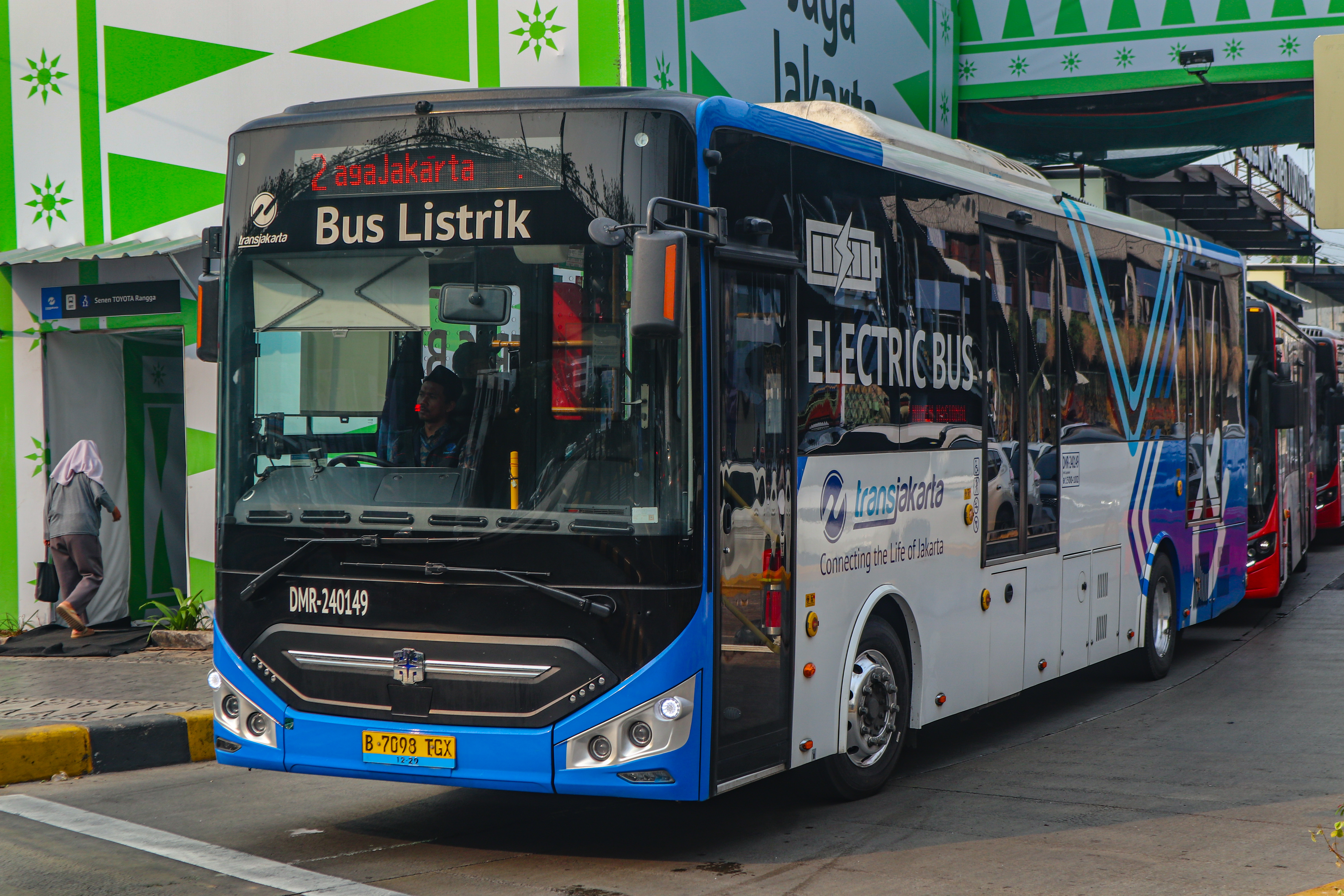
- The Zhongtong electric bus fleet of Corridor 2 departing from Senen Toyota Rangga BRT station

Overview
- System: Transjakarta
- Operator: PT. Transportasi Jakarta (TJ, infrastructures and staffs); Perum DAMRI (DMR, fleets and drivers); Pahala Kencana (PKT, fleets and drivers); Steady Safe (SAF, fleets and drivers)
- Began service: January 15, 2006

Route
- Route type: Street-level Bus Rapid Transit
- Locale: Central Jakarta; East Jakarta
- Length: 17.88 km
- Stations: 24 (original); 23 (current temporary adjustment)

Transjakarta Corridor 2 is a bus rapid transit corridor in Jakarta, Indonesia, operated by Transjakarta. It connects the Pulo Gadung Bus Terminal in East Jakarta to the Monumen Nasional BRT station in Central Jakarta.

The route is spiral-shaped: Buses go through Perintis Kemerdekaan Ave and Suprapto Ave and serves 14 stations in both directions. From Senen Toyota Rangga station, westbound buses travel through Imam Sapi'i St, Kwini II St, Abdul Rahman Saleh Rd, Pejambon Rd, Medan Merdeka Timur Blvd, Perwira Rd, Katedral Rd, Djuanda Ave, Veteran III St, and Medan Merdeka Utara Blvd, stopping at 7 stations in one direction before terminating at Monumen Nasional station. Eastbound buses travel through Medan Merdeka Barat Blvd, Medan Merdeka Selatan Blvd, and Kwitang Raya Ave, stopping at 3 stations unidirectionally before closing the loop at Senen Toyota Rangga station and continuing eastwards towards Pulo Gadung. It is one of the two spiral-shaped main BRT corridors, the other being Corridor 12.

This corridor is integrated with the Pasar Senen railway station, which serves both the KRL Commuterline and intercity train services at Senen Toyota Rangga BRT station, and with Juanda railway station, which serves the KRL Commuterline, at Juanda BRT station.

On 4 March 2023, Corridor 2 temporarily relocated its terminus from Harmoni to the Monumen Nasional, due to the construction of the Jakarta MRT (see #Temporary readjustment).

== History ==
=== Early operational ===
Corridor 2 was inaugurated on 15 January 2006, alongside Corridor 3. The inauguration coincided with the inauguration of Corridor 1 two years earlier. The inauguration received widespread public enthusiasm. At the time, Transjakarta promised that 71 new buses would serve Corridors 2 and 3 in April 2006, three months after the first day of operation.

=== Route extension ===
On 19 May 2014, the route was extended by 7.61 kilometers from Pulo Gadung to Ujung Menteng in Bekasi. It was Transjakarta's first BRT corridor to cross the border of Jakarta. The new stations were Raya Bekasi KIP, Raya Bekasi Tipar Cakung, Cakung United Tractors, Raya Bekasi Pasar Cakung, Raya Bekasi Cakung Cilincing, Raya Bekasi Pulo Gebang, and Raya Bekasi Ujung Menteng. At the time of opening, four stations in Kota Harapan Indah — 2 stations in the estate's entrance and 2 stations near Family Market — were still under construction. They were completed by the end of May 2014.

The extension initially operated as a BRT service coded 2E. It was later redesignated 2B and converted into an integrated non-BRT feeder route that, in addition to the existing BRT stations, also served several pedestrian-level stops along the sidewalk. However, from 2023 until 2026, the route operated as a non-BRT feeder service with no BRT connections, using low-floor Metrotrans buses that served only pedestrian-level bus stops. Most BRT stations were demolished during the construction of the Kelapa Gading–Pulo Gebang Highway. Several stations were rebuilt, but remained unused and suffered from vandalism.

On 19 January 2026, Transjakarta amended the route to now reutilise BRT stations that had long been abandoned. On the same day, route 2B started operating as an integrated non-BRT feeder route, stopping at BRT stations that have not been vandalised and are in good condition, while some vandalised, badly damaged stations are being repaired.

=== Temporary readjustment ===
Harmoni BRT station was formerly the terminus of Corridor 2. As the busiest station in the network, it also served Corridors 1, 3, and 8. However, due to the construction of Phase 2A of the Jakarta MRT, the Harmoni station was relocated to a temporary structure from 4 March 2023, and will remain so until the completion of the MRT works, either in 2027 or 2029. The original permanent building was demolished to make way for the new Harmoni MRT station. The temporary structure doesn't have enough capacity to accommodate high passenger volumes. As a result, Transjakarta decided that it would only serve Corridor 1 and temporarily moved Corridor 2's terminus to the Monumen Nasional BRT station, located near the National Monument.

== List of BRT stations ==
=== Main BRT corridor ===
- Due to the construction of Phase 2A of the Jakarta MRT, Corridor 2 currently does not serve Harmoni BRT station and terminates at the Monumen Nasional BRT station. This arrangement will remain in place until the completion of the MRT construction, expected in either 2027 or 2029.
- All stations are served by buses 24 hours a day.
- Stations indicated by a ← sign have a one-way service towards Pulo Gadung only. Stations indicated by a → sign have a one-way service towards Monumen Nasional only.

Corridor 2 (Pulo Gadung – Monumen Nasional)
Code	Station name	Transfer/Notes	Bus terminal or train station nearby
Stations in order: From top to bottom (downwards) towards Monumen Nasional (→); from bottom to top (upwards) towards Pulo Gadung (←)
2 01 4 01	Pulo Gadung	Pulo Gadung	Perintis (Planned) Pulo Gadung Bus Terminal
2 02	Bermis	Bermis	
2 03	Pulo Mas	Pulo Mas	Kelapa Gading Timur (Planned) Pulomas
2 04	Perintis Kemerdekaan	Perintis Kemerdekaan	Kelapa Gading Barat (Planned)
2 05	Pedongkelan	Pedongkelan	
2 06	Cempaka Mas	Cempaka Mas Simpang Cempaka (via skybridge)	Sumur Batu (Planned)
2 07	Sumur Batu	Sumur Batu	
2 08	Cempaka Baru	Cempaka Baru	Cempaka Baru (Planned)
2 09	Pasar Cempaka Putih	Pasar Cempaka Putih	
2 10	Rawa Selatan	Rawa Selatan	Galur (Planned)
2 11	Galur	Galur	
2 12 14 01	Senen Toyota Rangga	Senen Toyota Rangga Jaga Jakarta (temporarily via shuttle service 21ST)	Senen (Planned) Pasar Senen Senen Bus Terminal
2 13 14 02	Senen Raya →	Senen Raya	
2 14	RSPAD →		
2 15	Pejambon →		
2 16	Gambir →		Gambir Gambir 2 (transfer outside paid area)
2 17	Istiqlal →		
2 18 3 15	Juanda →	Juanda	Juanda
2 19 3 14	Pecenongan →	Pecenongan	
2 20 1 15	~~Harmoni~~ →	~~Harmoni~~	~~Harmoni (U/C)~~
Towards Monumen Nasional (→) heads straight to Monumen Nasional
Towards Pulo Gadung (←) heads straight to Senen Toyota Rangga
2 24	Kwitang ←	Kwitang	Kwitang (Planned)
2 23	Gambir 2 ←	Gambir 2	Gambir Gambir (transfer outside paid area)
2 22	Balai Kota ←	Balai Kota	
2 21 1 14	Monumen Nasional	Monumen Nasional	Monas (U/C)

=== Route 2B: Corridor 2 extension ===
- The following BRT stations were built and opened in 2014 to serve Bekasi Raya Rd and Harapan Indah neighbourhood. Services were initially operated as Corridor 2E until the COVID-19 pandemic, when it was deactivated and replaced by service which used low-floor Metrotrans buses from 19 September 2023 until 19 January 2026. Since then, several stations have been reactivated and service has switched to using high-floor buses to serve these stations. However, service is still a non-BRT service as many stations have not been reactivated and the service continues to stop at bus stops along the road.
- Stations indicated by a ← sign have a one-way service towards Pulo Gadung only. Stations indicated by a → sign have a one-way service towards Harapan Indah only.
- Italic text indicates that the BRT station is not in operation, and the bus serves bus stops outside the BRT station.

Route 2B (Pulo Gadung – Transera Harapan Indah)
Code	Station name	Transfer/Notes	Bus terminal or train station nearby
Stations in order: From top to bottom (downwards) towards Transera Harapan Indah (→); from bottom to top (upwards) towards Pulo Gadung (←)
	Pulo Gadung Bus Terminal	Bus stop outside the BRT station	Pulo Gadung (transfer outside paid area) Perintis (planned)
2E01	Rawa Terate		Pulo Gadung (planned)
2E02	~~Tipar Cakung~~	Served by bus stops Tipar Cakung 1/2	
2E03	Cakung		Penggilingan (planned)
2E04	Pasar Cakung		
2E05	Cakung Cilincing		Cakung Barat (planned)
2E06	Raya Bekasi Pulo Gebang		
2E07	Ujung Menteng		Ujung Menteng (planned)
2E08	~~Kota Harapan Indah~~	Served by bus stops Kota Harapan Indah 1/2	
2E09	~~Pasar Modern Harapan Indah →~~	Served by bus stops Pasar Modern 1 and Lapangan Terbang Transera	
~~Towards Transera Harapan Indah (→) heads straight to Transera Harapan Indah~~
~~Towards Pulo Gadung (←) heads straight to Kota Harapan Indah~~
2E10	~~Tanah Apit ←~~	Served by bus stop Tanah Apit outside the BRT station	
2E11	~~Transera Harapan Indah~~	Bus stop outside the BRT station	

== Cross-corridor route ==
=== Route 2A (Pulo Gadung – Rawa Buaya) ===
- Stations indicated by a ← sign have a one-way service towards Pulo Gadung only.

Route 2A (Pulo Gadung – Rawa Buaya)
Code	Station name	Transfer/Notes	Bus terminal or train station nearby
Stations in order: From top to bottom (downwards) towards Rawa Buaya (→); from bottom to top (upwards) towards Pulo Gadung (←)
2 01 4 01	Pulo Gadung	Pulo Gadung	Perintis (Planned) Pulo Gadung Bus Terminal
2 02	Bermis	Bermis	
2 03	Pulo Mas	Pulo Mas	Kelapa Gading Timur (Planned) Pulomas
2 04	Perintis Kemerdekaan	Perintis Kemerdekaan	Kelapa Gading Barat (Planned)
2 05	Pedongkelan	Pedongkelan	
2 06	Cempaka Mas	Cempaka Mas Simpang Cempaka (via skybridge)	Sumur Batu (Planned)
2 07	Sumur Batu	Sumir Batu	
2 08	Cempaka Baru	Cempaka Baru	Cempaka Baru (Planned)
2 09	Pasar Cempaka Putih	Pasar Cempaka Putih	
2 10	Rawa Selatan	Rawa Selatan	Galur (Planned)
2 11	Galur	Galur	
2 12 14 01	Senen Toyota Rangga	Senen Toyota Rangga Jaga Jakarta (temporarily via shuttle service 21ST)	Senen (Planned) Pasar Senen Senen Bus Terminal
2 24	Kwitang	Kwitang	Kwitang (Planned)
Towards Rawa Buaya (→) heads straight to Balai Kota
2 23	Gambir 2 ←	Gambir 2	Gambir Gambir (transfer outside paid area)
2 22	Balai Kota	Balai Kota	
8 23	Petojo	Petojo	Petojo (planned)
3 12	Roxy	Roxy	
3 11	Grogol	Grogol Grogol Reformasi (via skybridge)	Grogol (Planned) Grogol Bus Terminal
3 10 8 18	Jelambar	Jelambar	
3 09 8 17	Damai	Damai	Pesing
3 08	Taman Kota	Taman Kota	Taman Kota
3 07	Jembatan Gantung	Jembatan Gantung	
3 06	Pulo Nangka	Pulo Nangka	
3 05	Jembatan Baru	Jembatan Baru	
3 04	Rawa Buaya	Rawa Buaya	

== Special route ==
=== Route 2C (Balai Kota – JIExpo Kemayoran) ===
- Only operates during the Jakarta Fair and/or other events in Jakarta International Expo. The route is currently inactive.

Route 2C (Balai Kota – JIExpo Kemayoran)
Code	Station name	Transfer/Notes	Bus terminal or train station nearby
Stations in order: From top to bottom (downwards) towards JIExpo Kemayoran (→); from bottom to top (upwards) towards Balai Kota (←)
2 22	Balai Kota	Balai Kota	
2 21 1 14	Monumen Nasional	Monumen Nasional	Monas (U/C)
2 19 3 14	Pecenongan	Pecenongan	
2 18 3 15	Juanda	Juanda	Juanda
5 05	Pasar Baru Timur	Pasar Baru Timur	
Towards JIEXPO Kemayoran (→) heads straight to JIEXPO Kemayoran
14 04	Kemayoran ←	Kemayoran	
14 05	JIEXPO Kemayoran	JIEXPO Kemayoran	

== Fleets ==
=== (Pulo Gadung- Monumen Nasional) ===
Operator	Type	Caption	Image	Depots
Main BRT Fleet
Perum DAMRI	Zhongtong Bus N12	operates every day (05:00–22:00 WIB)		Pulo Gadung
Perum DAMRI	Zhongtong Bus LCK6180GC	operates every day (05:00–22:00 WIB)		Pulo Gadung
Mayasari Bakti	Scania K320IA	operates every day (05:00–22:00 WIB)		Kedaung Kali Angke
Bianglala Metropolitan	Mercedes-Benz OH 1626	Operates night bus		Ciputat (South Tangerang City, Banten)
Reserve BRT Fleet
Swakelola Transjakarta	Hino RK1 JSNL	operates on weekdays (05:00–22:00 WIB)		Kedaung Kali Angke
Swakelola Transjakarta	Mercedes-Benz OH 1526	operates on weekdays (05:00–22:00 WIB)		Cawang
Swakelola Transjakarta	Scania K320IA	operates on weekdays (05:00–22:00 WIB)		Pulo Gadung
Mayasari Bakti	Scania K310IB	Operates on holiday (05:00–22:00 WIB)		Cijantung

=== (Pulo Gadung- Rawa Buaya) ===
Operator	Type	Caption	Image	Depots
Main BRT Fleet
Perum DAMRI	Zhongtong Bus N12	operates every day (05:00–22:00 WIB)		Pulo Gadung
Mayasari Bakti	Scania K310IB	operates every day (05:00–22:00 WIB)		Pulo Gadung
Mayasari Bakti	Scania K320IA	operates every day (05:00–22:00 WIB)		Pulo Gadung
Reserve BRT Fleet
Swakelola Transjakarta	Hino RK1 JSNL	operates every day (05:00–22:00 WIB)		Kedaung Kali Angke
Swakelola Transjakarta	Scania K320IA	operates every day (05:00–22:00 WIB)		Pulo Gadung
Perum DAMRI	Zhongtong Bus LCK6180GC	operates every day (05:00–22:00 WIB)		Pulo Gadung

== Incidents ==
Two BRT stations on Corridor 2 — Senen (the temporary structure) and Harmoni — were set on fire by protesters during the Omnibus Law protest on 8 October 2020. The new Senen station, along with Kwitang, Gambir 1, and several other stations, were also damaged by protesters. As a result, Transjakarta estimated the total losses from the destruction of all 18 affected BRT stations at up to 45 billion rupiah.

== See also ==
- Transjakarta
  - List of Transjakarta corridors
