= Juanda (Transjakarta) =

Bus rapid transit station in Jakarta, Indonesia

2 18 3 15 Juanda
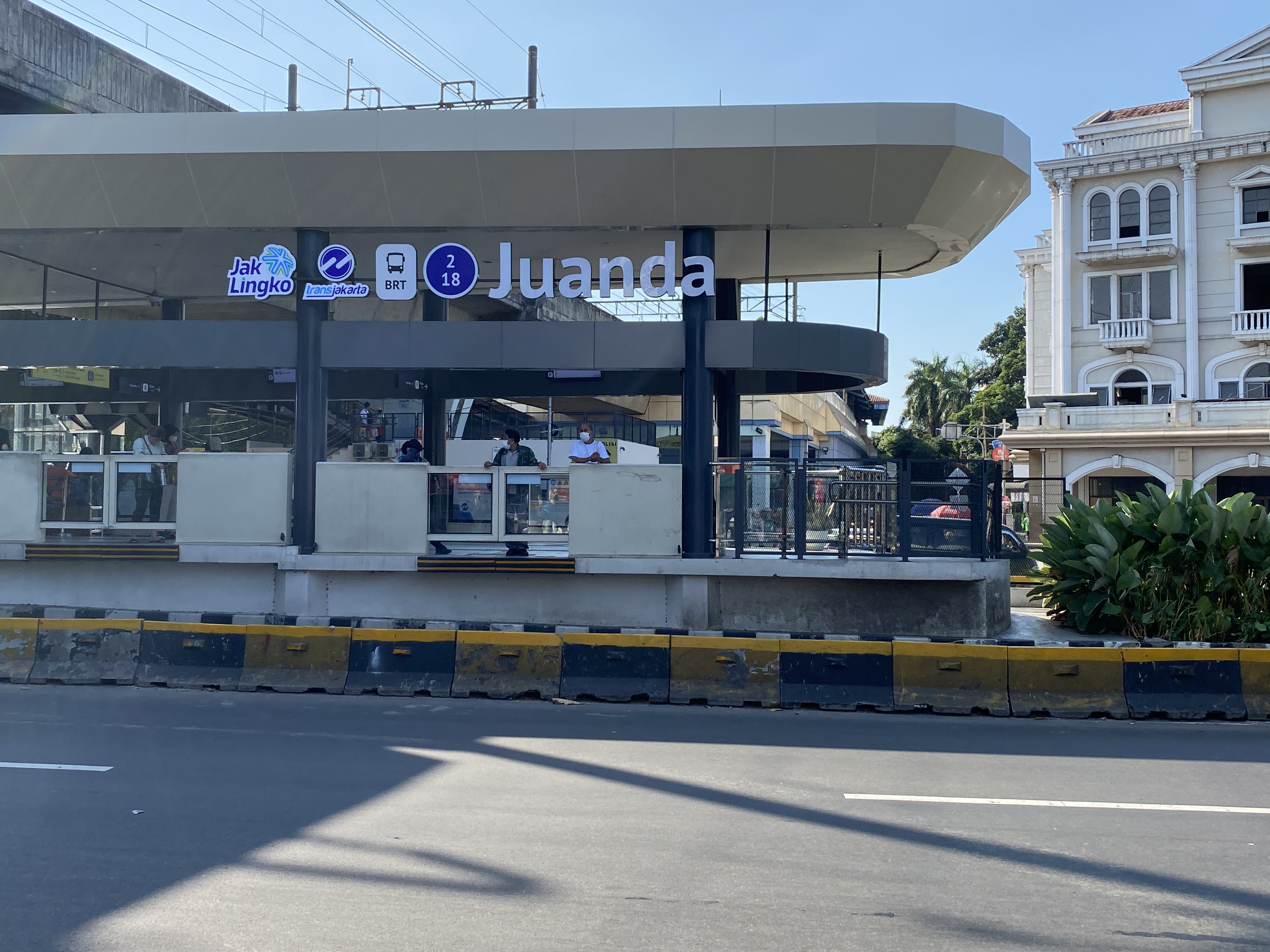

General information
- Other names: Stasiun Juanda
- Location: Ir Haji Juanda Street, Pasar Baru, Sawah Besar, Central Jakarta 10710, Indonesia
- Coordinates: 6.1680416°S 106.8307065°E
- System: Transjakarta bus rapid transit station
- Owner: Transjakarta
- Operator: Transjakarta
- Lines: List of Transjakarta corridors#Corridor 2 List of Transjakarta corridors#Cross-corridor routes List of TransJakarta corridors#Cross-corridor routes List of TransJakarta corridors#Corridor 8
- Platforms: Single island platform
- Connections: Juanda

Construction
- Structure type: At-grade
- Cycle facilities: No

Other information
- Status: In service

History
- Opened: 15 January 2006
- Rebuilt: 4 March 2023; 3 years ago

Services
Preceding		Following
Istiqlal One-way operation	Corridor 2	Pecenongan towards Monumen Nasional
Pecenongan One-way operation	Corridor 5 Route 5C Terminus	Lapangan Banteng towards Cililitan
Pasar Baru towards Kampung Rambutan	Corridor 7 Route 7F Terminus	Pecenongan One-way operation
Pecenongan towards Lebak Bulus	Corridor 8 via Tomang	Pasar Baru Terminus
Pecenongan towards Lebak Bulus	Corridor 8 via Cideng	Pasar Baru Terminus
Pecenongan towards Jelambar	Corridor 8 Route 8A Sunday morning only	Pasar Baru Terminus
Pasar Baru Timur towards Tanjung Priok	Corridor 10 Route 10H	Pecenongan towards Bundaran Senayan
Location

Juanda is a Transjakarta bus rapid transit station located on Ir. H. Juanda Street, Pasar Baru, Sawah Besar, Central Jakarta, Indonesia. It serves as an interchange between Corridors 2 and 8 and is connected to Juanda KRL Station on the Bogor Line.

The station is named after the street it is located on, taken after Djuanda Kartawidjaja. After the mass renaming of stations on the network in 2023, it is one of the four remaining stations named after Indonesia's national heroes, alongside M.H. Thamrin, Halim, and Rasuna Said stations.

== History ==
The station opened on 15 January 2006 as an interchange between Corridors 2 and 3, when both corridors were launched together. The building was originally tiny and only had one gate on each side of the platform. In late 2013, the station was later extended with platform extension to the east, increasing the number of gates to six on each side, although only some of them were used.

On 15 April 2022, the station was closed for revitalisation works, alongside Dukuh Atas, Tosari, Bundaran HI, Cikoko Stasiun Cawang (now Cikoko), Sarinah (now M.H. Thamrin), Kebon Pala (now Matraman Baru), Kwitang, Balai Kota, Gelora Bung Karno (now Senayan), and Stasiun Jatinegara stations. As an alternative, Transjakarta provided shuttle service 2PJ, which was later replaced by 2ST, which continued to operate until 16 November 2023. There was also an additional service 1ST, which was in operation until 11 September 2022.

On 4 March 2023, the station reopened, alongside M.H. Thamrin and Dukuh Atas stations. However, following the closure of the original Harmoni station due to construction works of the Jakarta MRT North–South Line extension and subsequent rerouting of multiple services, Corridor 3 ceased to serve this station, alongside Pecenongan and Pasar Baru stations, as it was rerouted to follow the path of Corridor 1 and terminate at Bundaran HI station (later shortened again on 29 May 2023, since then terminating at Monumen Nasional station). As a replacement, Corridor 8 was extended to serve the three stations and terminate at Pasar Baru. Despite this, the new station still carries its Corridor 3 station number, signalling that the adjustment might be temporary, effective at least until the completion of the MRT construction in 2027 or 2029.

== Building and layout ==
After revitalisation works, the new station features similar design to that of ASEAN and Kejaksaan Agung stations, with circular corners at the eastern end. The new station consists of two levels: the upper level as a concourse area to exit and enter the paid area, and lower level for the platform area, which now has nine gates on each side. Other amenities of the station include prayer room (musala) and toilets.

The station was initially accessible through a skybridge at the northern end and pelican crossing at the southern end, before it was extended to the south. The skybridge was rebuilt, and is now much wider and features lifts to the BRT station and to the KRL station.

North	towards Cililitan towards Kampung Rambutan towards Tanjung Priok	towards Pasar Baru	(Pasar Baru) → (Lapangan Banteng) ↓
Island platform, doors open on the right
South	← (Pecenongan) towards Monumen Nasional towards Bundaran Senayan	towards Lebak Bulus

== Non-BRT bus services ==
Type	Route	Destination	Notes
Inner city feeder		Monumen Nasional—Jakarta International Stadium	Inside the station
Cross-border feeder (Transjabodetabek)		Juanda—Poris Plawad	Outside the station
#jakartaexplorer double-decker tour buses		History of Jakarta (Sejarah Jakarta)	Outside the station
#jakartaexplorer double-decker tour buses		Monas Explorer	Outside the station
Mikrotrans Jak Lingko	JAK 10	Jakarta Kota Station—Tanah Abang Station	Outside the station

== Places nearby ==
- Istiqlal Mosque
- Jakarta Cathedral
- Pasar Baru
- Jakarta Art Building

== Gallery ==
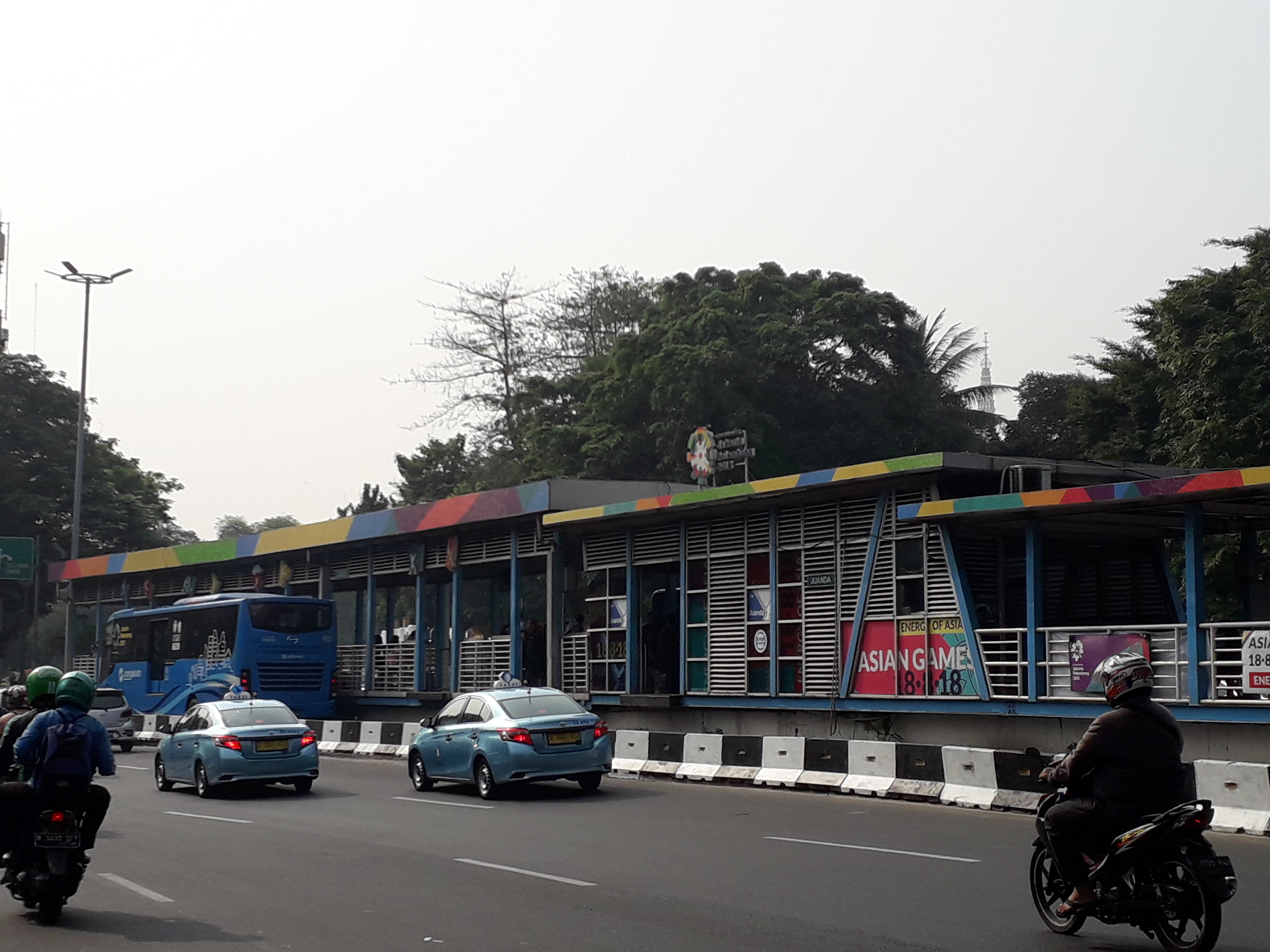
The station before revitalisation works, decorated with the 2018 Asian Games livery

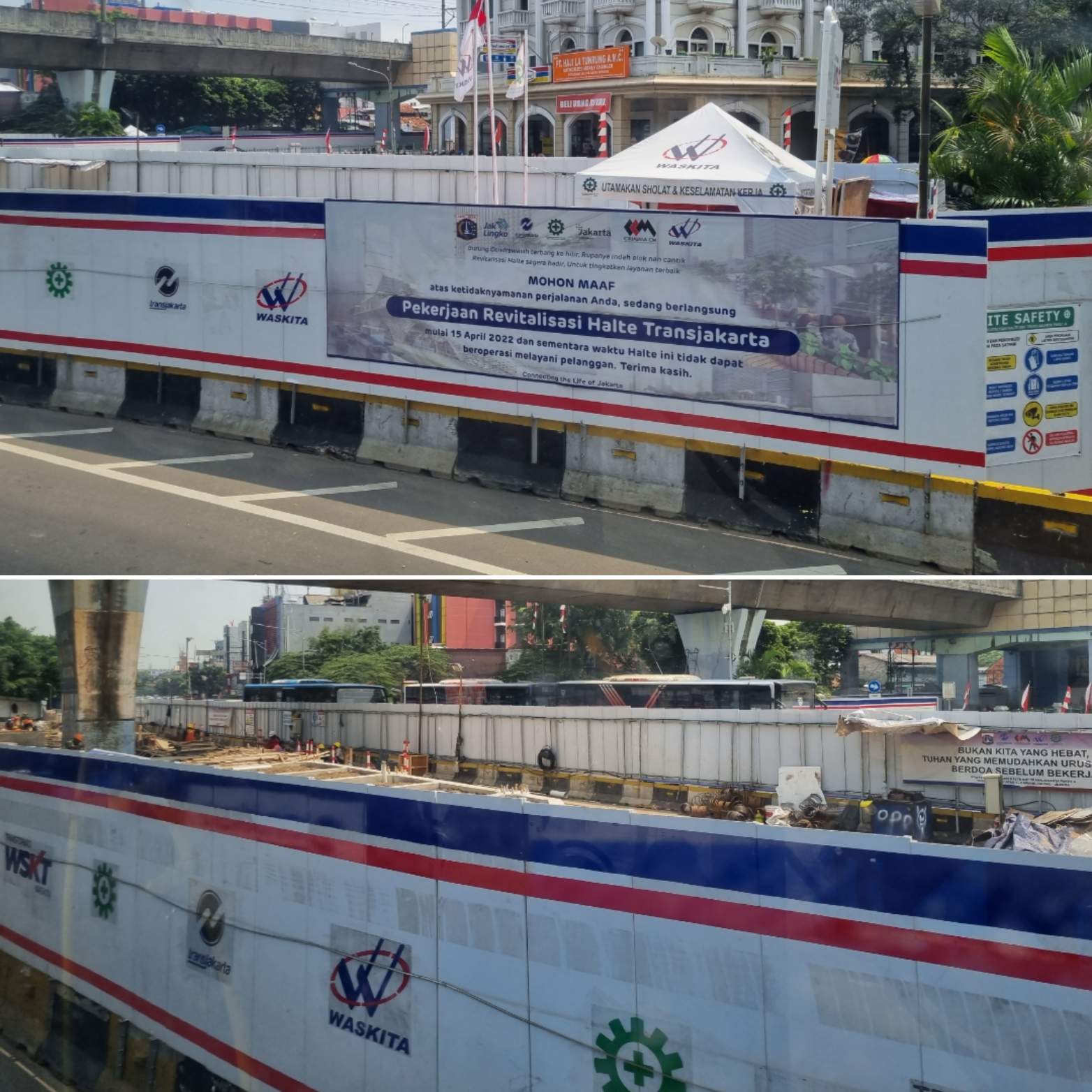
The station under revitalisation works, 2022

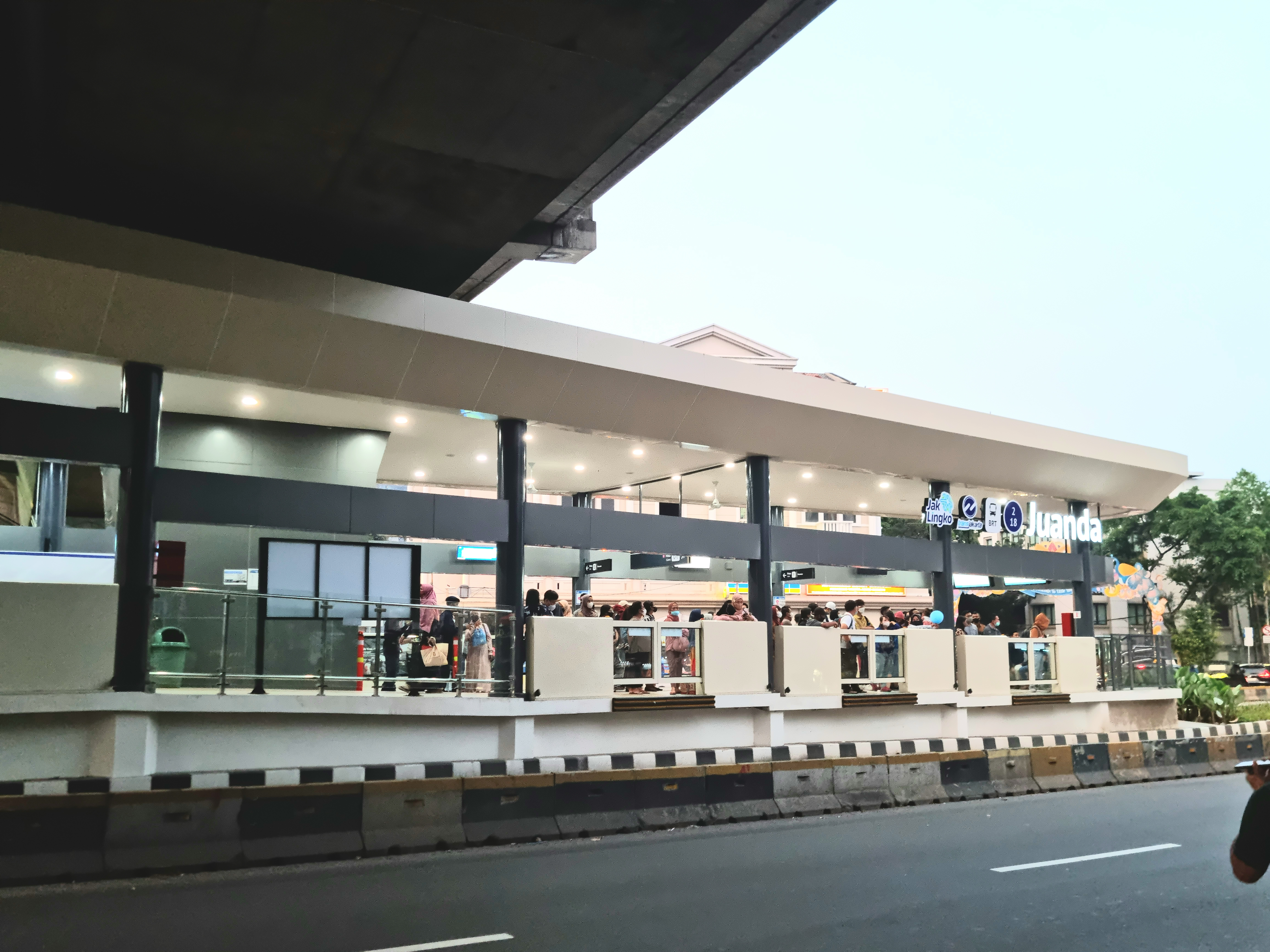
Exterior after revitalisation works

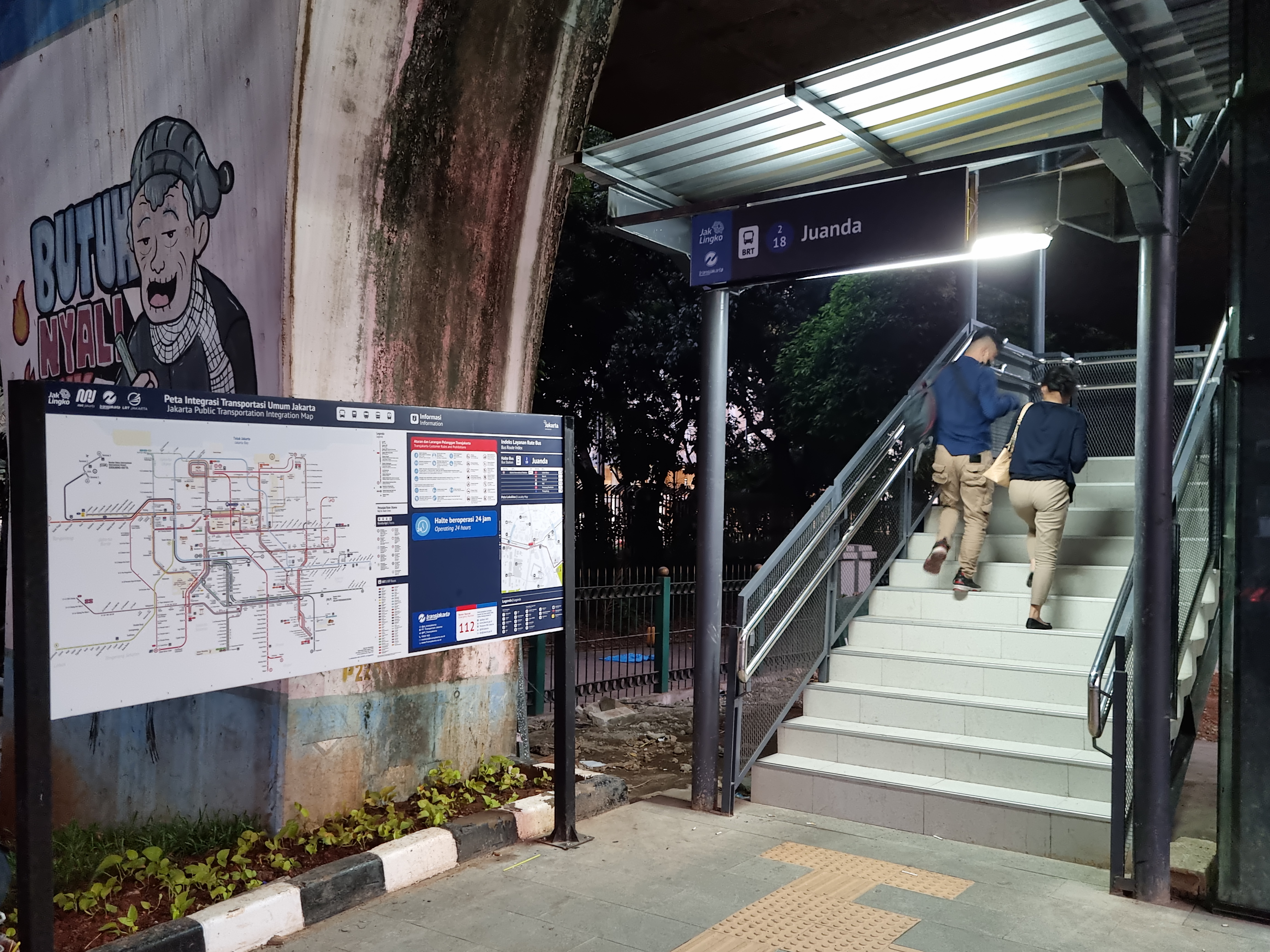
One of the entrances near Istiqlal Mosque

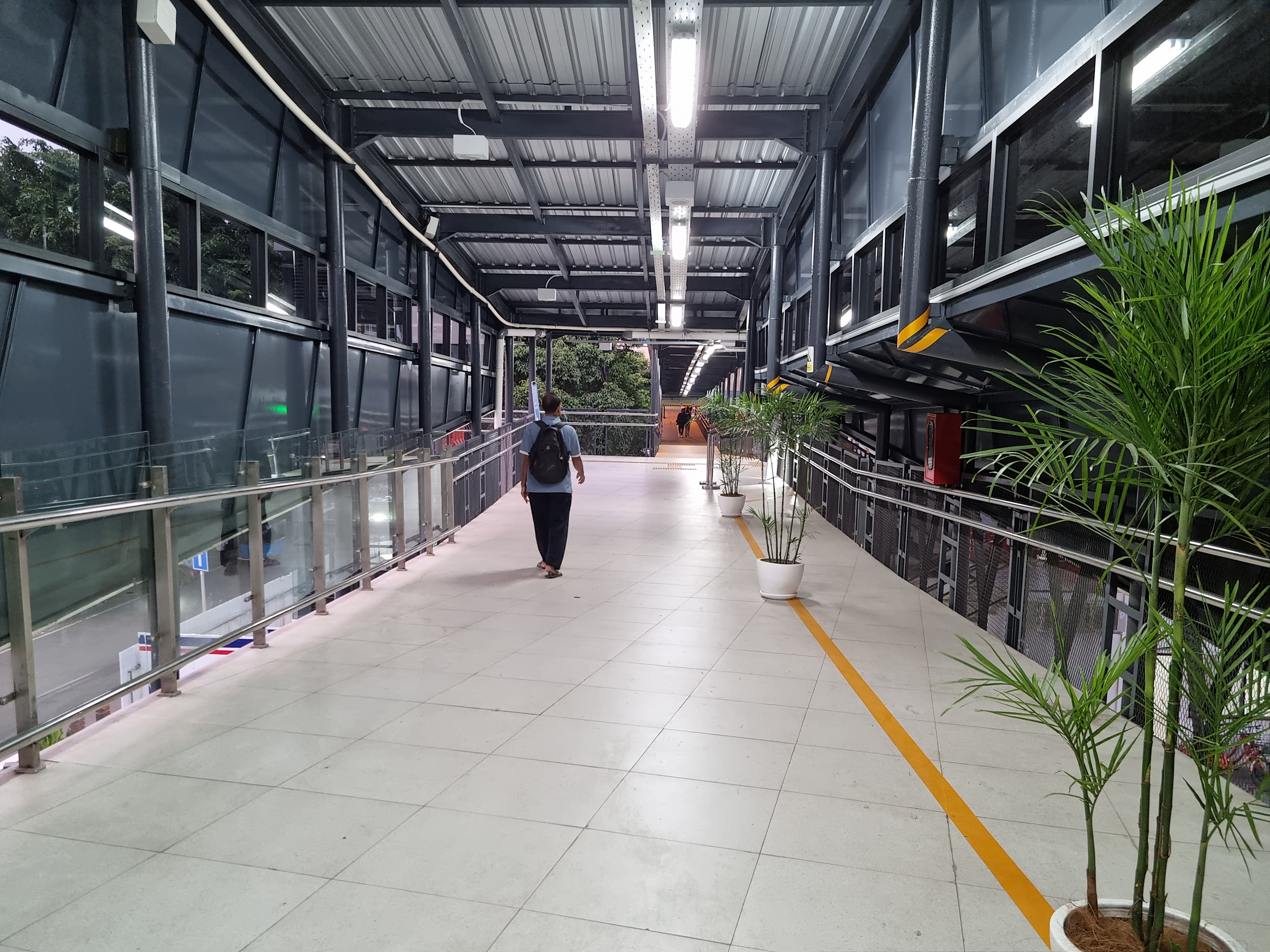
The skybridge at night

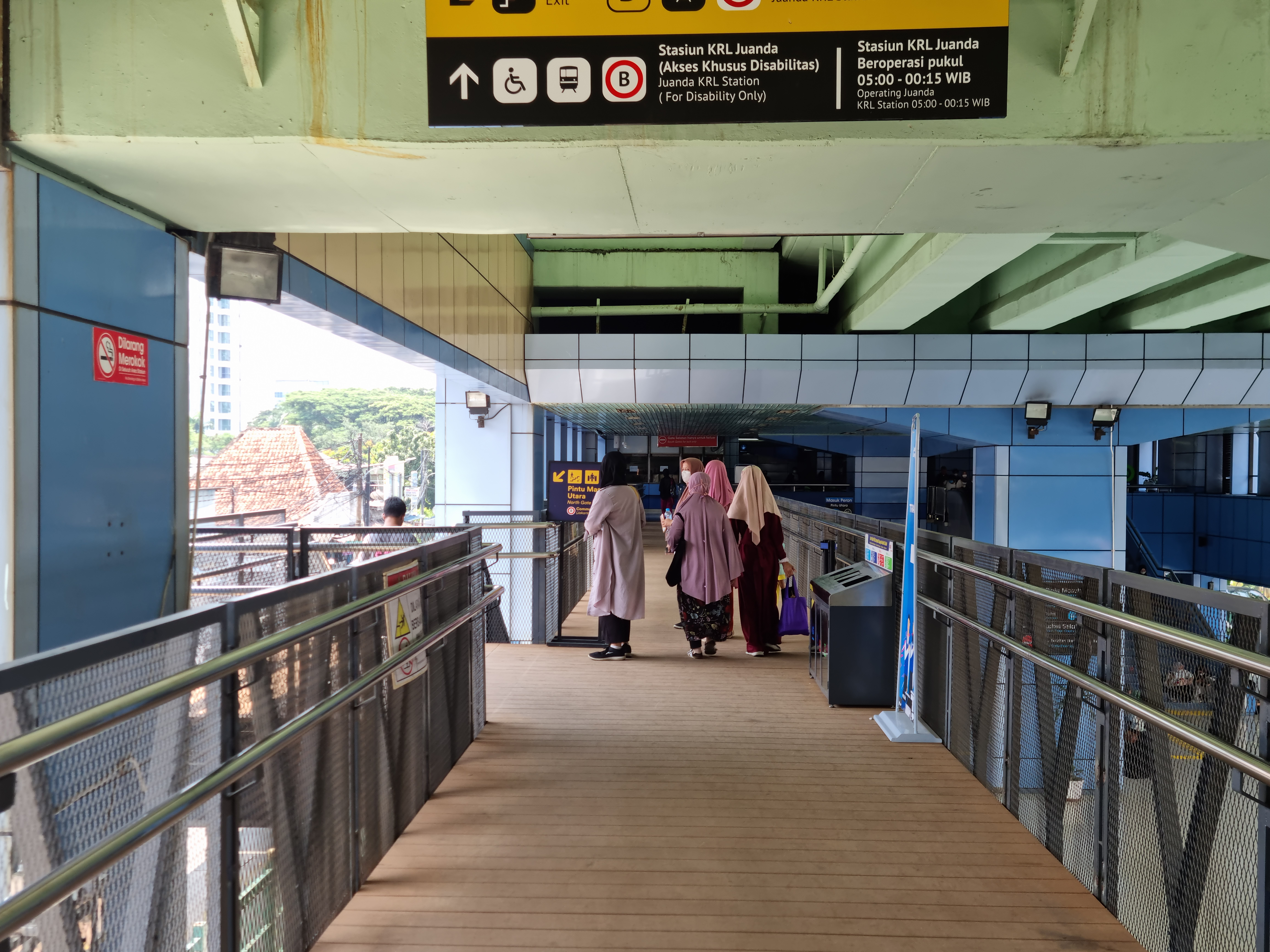
Step-free access to the KRL station

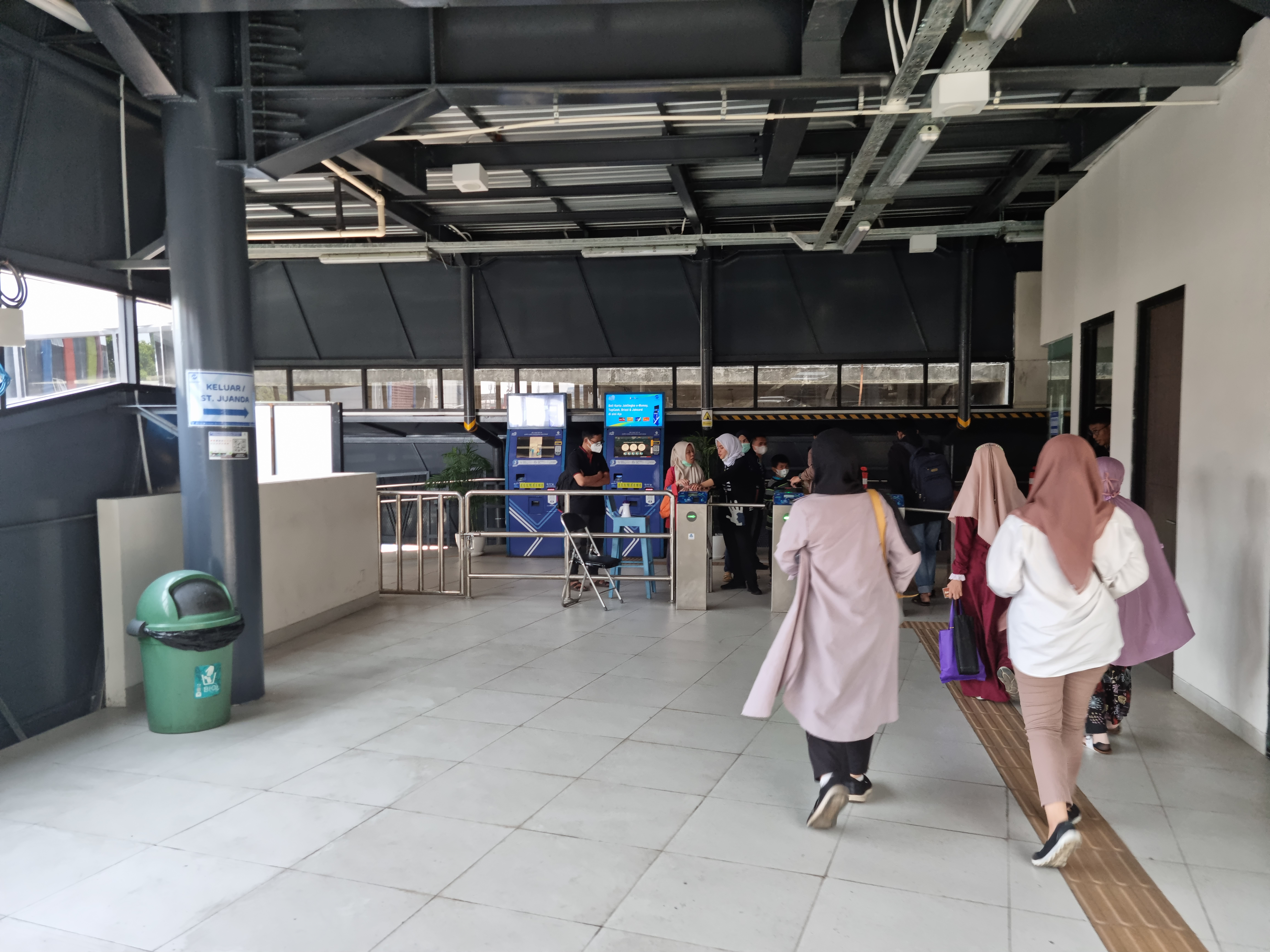
Station exit

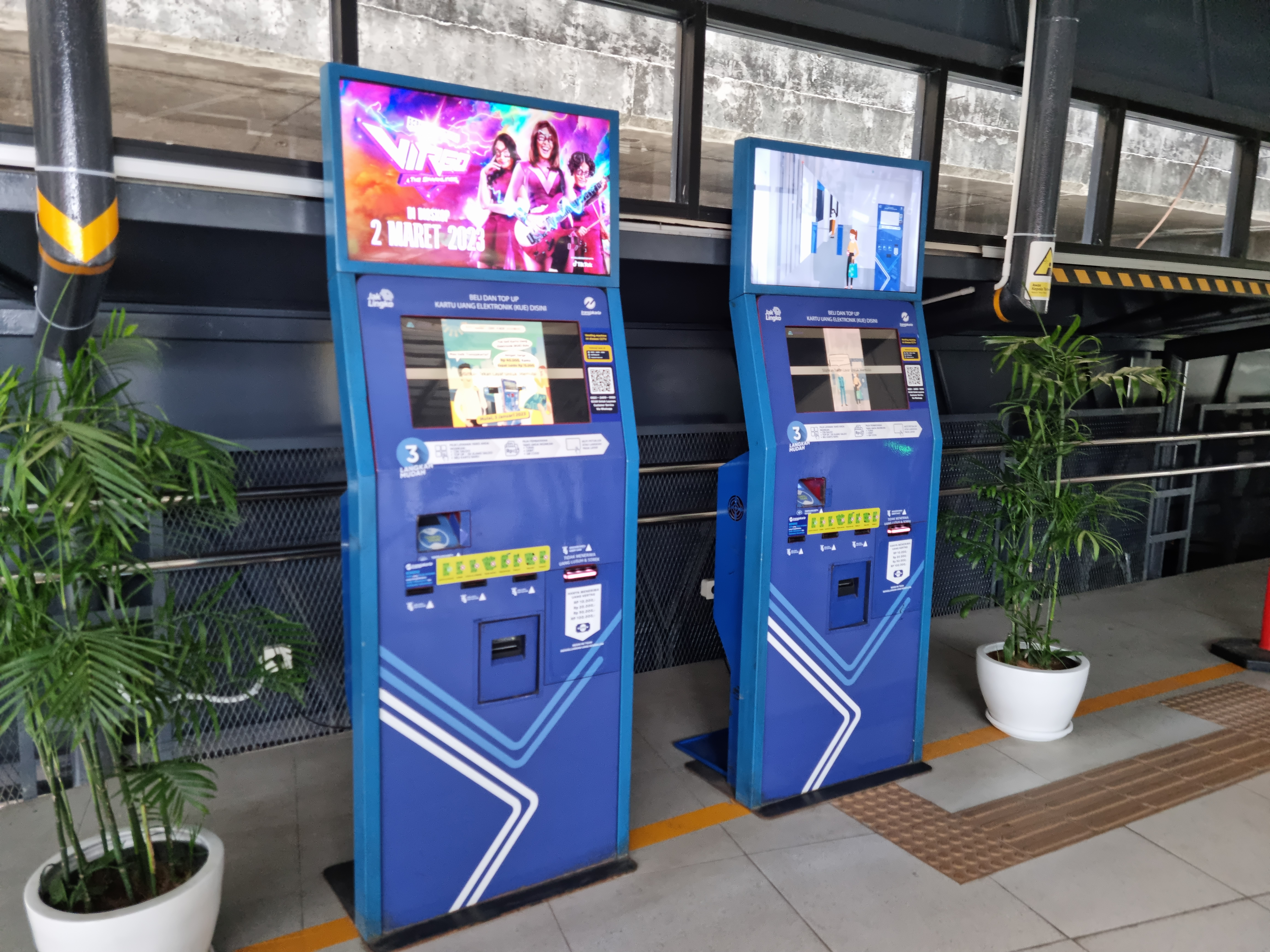
Ticket vending machines

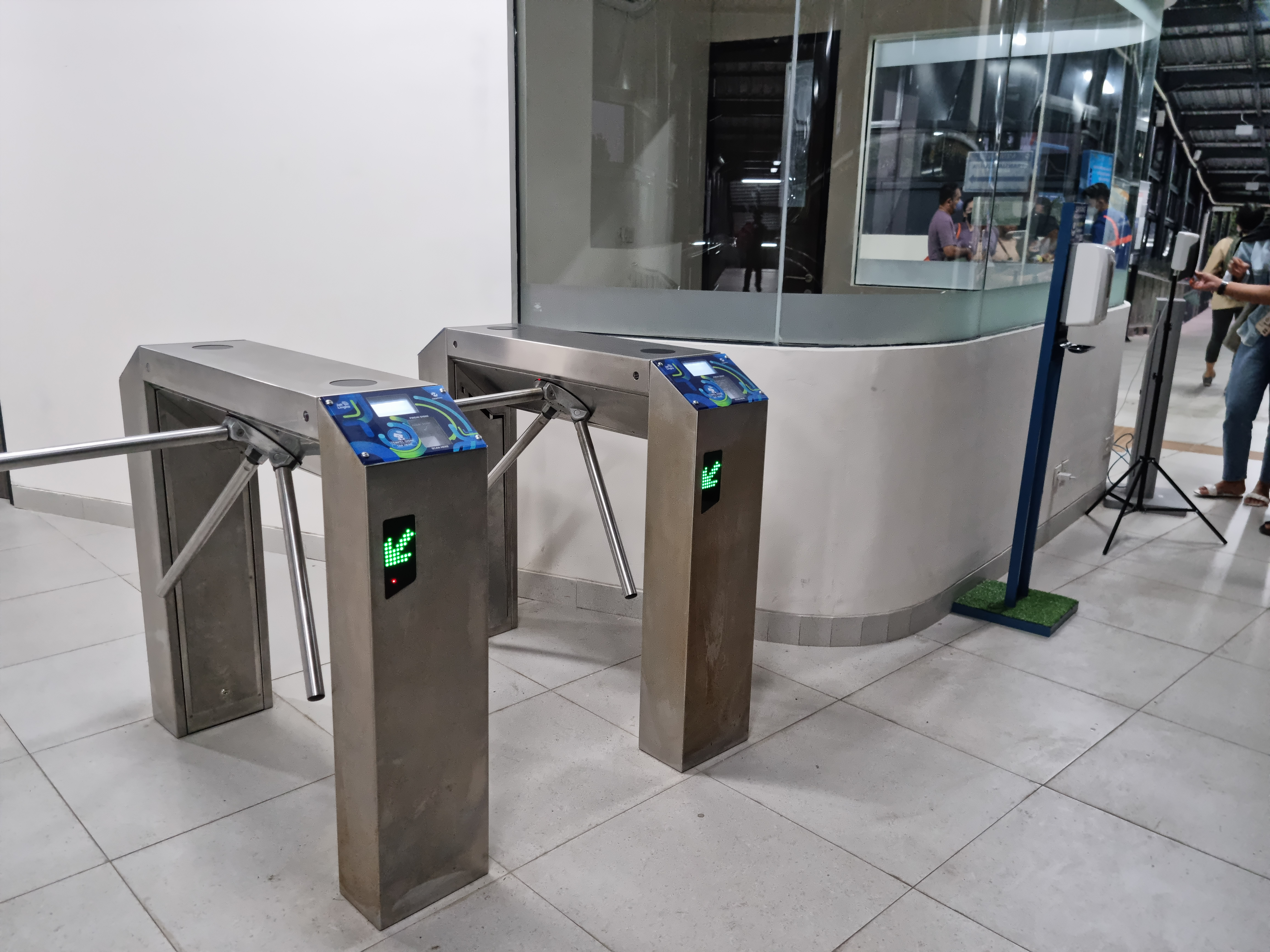
Fare gates

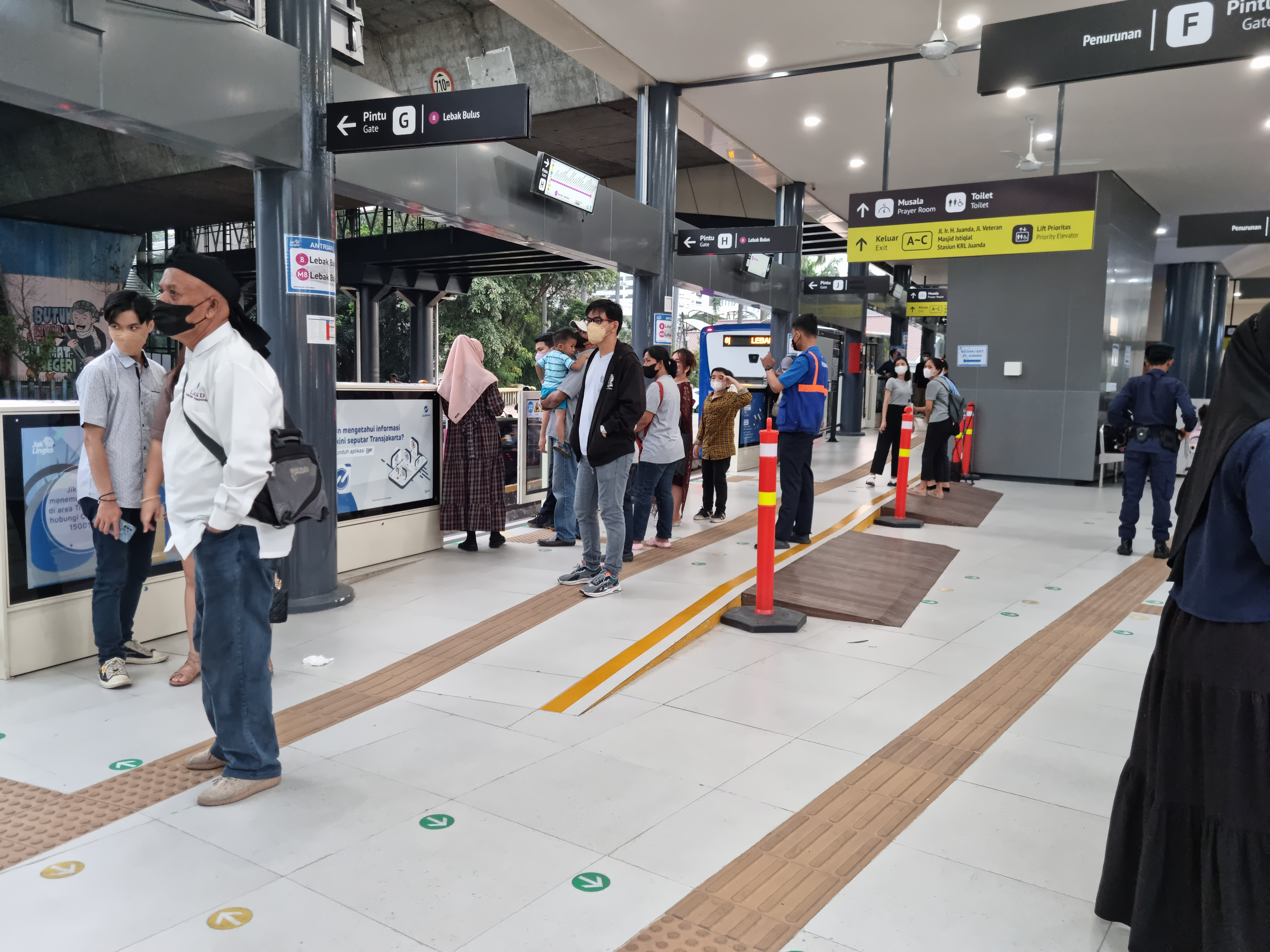
View of the platform area at night

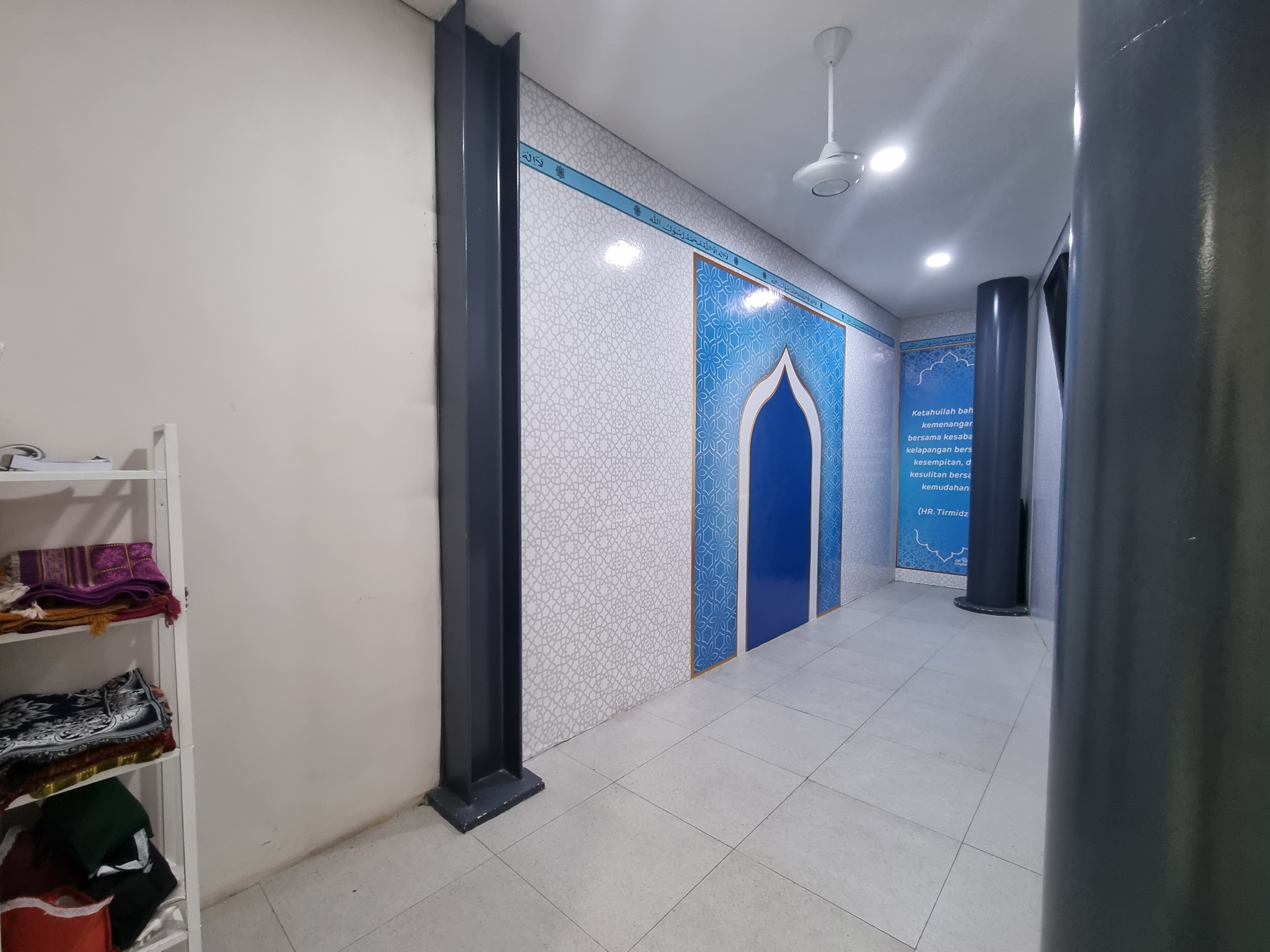
Prayer room

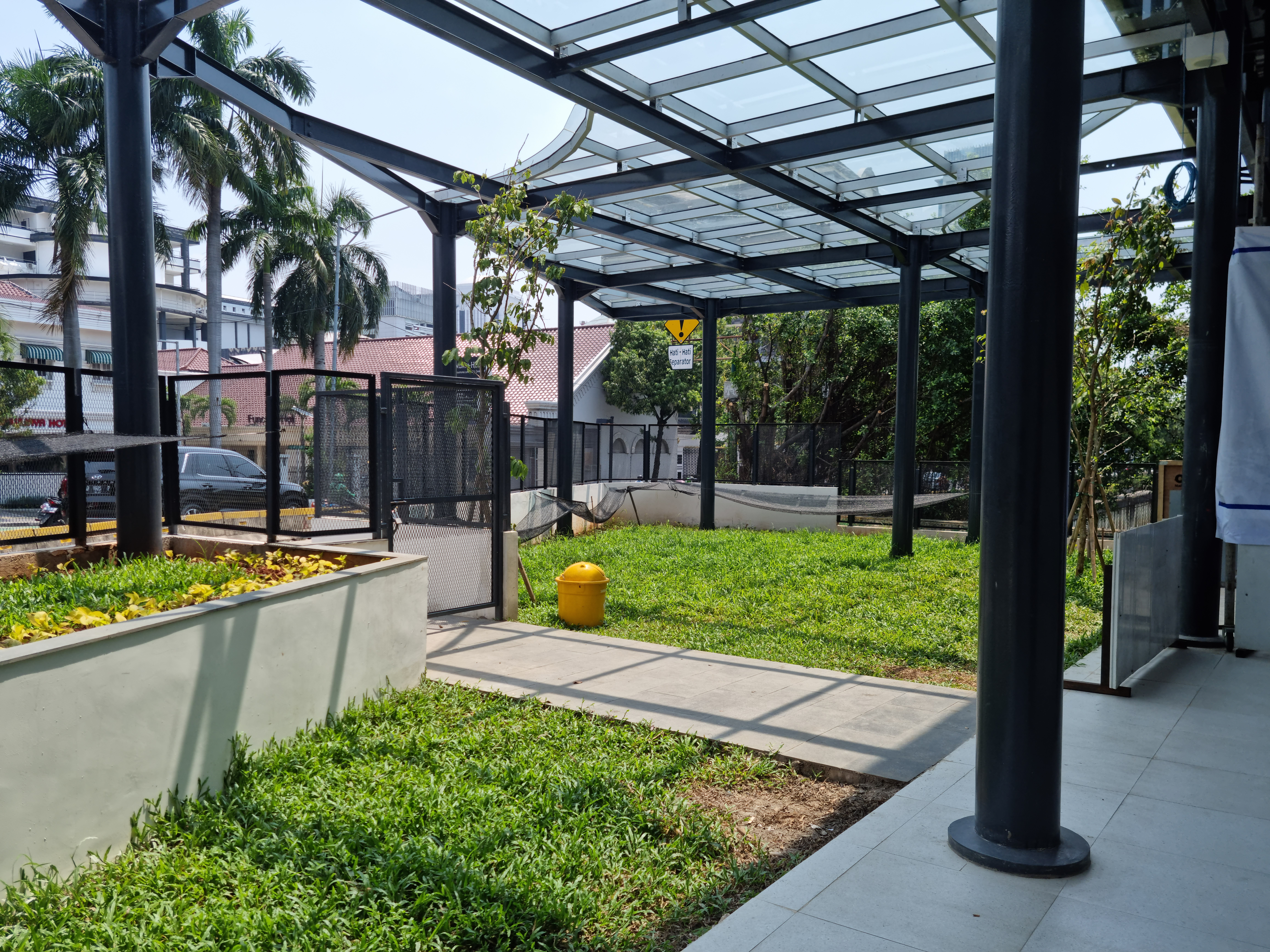
A mini park within the station
