= Stasiun Jatinegara (Transjakarta) =

Bus rapid transit station in Jakarta, Indonesia

11 10 Stasiun Jatinegara
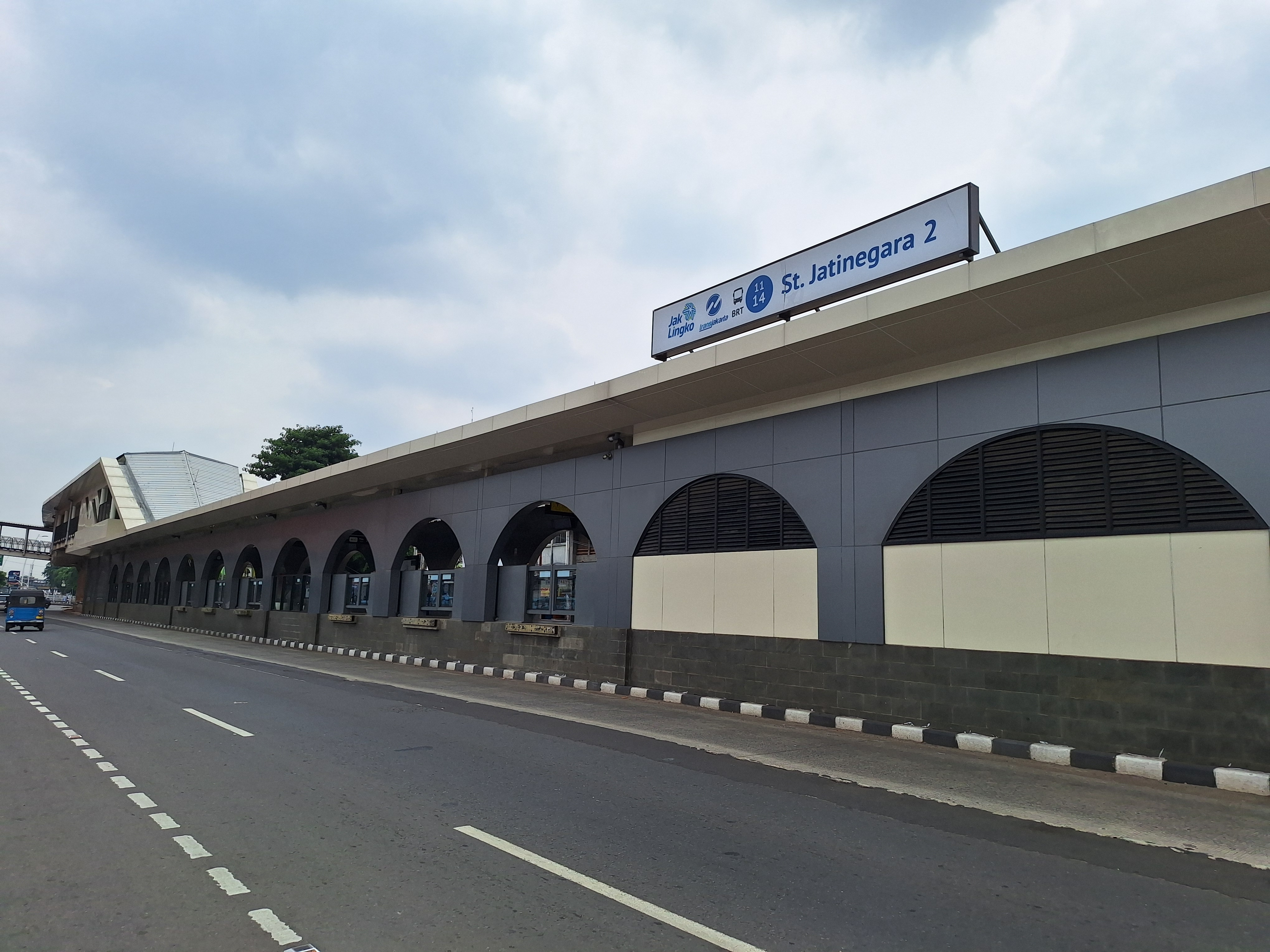
- Exterior looking southeast

General information
- Location: Bekasi Barat Raya St., Pisangan Baru, Matraman, East Jakarta, Jakarta, Indonesia
- Coordinates: 6.215579°S 106.868008°E
- System: Transjakarta
- Owner: Transjakarta
- Operator: Transjakarta
- Lines: List of TransJakarta corridors#Corridor 11
- Platforms: Single island platform
- Connections: Bali Mester; Jatinegara

Construction
- Structure type: At-grade
- Cycle facilities: No

History
- Opened: 28 December 2011
- Rebuilt: 2022
- Former names: Stasiun Jatinegara 2

Services
Preceding		Following
Flyover Jatinegara One-way operation	Corridor 11	Jatinegara towards Kampung Melayu
Flyover Jatinegara towards Pulo Gebang	Corridor 11	Kampung Melayu One-way operation
Matraman Baru One-way operation	Corridor 5 transfer at Bali Mester	Jatinegara towards Kampung Melayu
Matraman Baru One-way operation	Corridor 5 Route 5C transfer at Bali Mester	Jatinegara towards Cililitan
Location

Stasiun Jatinegara is a Transjakarta bus rapid transit station located adjacent to the Jatinegara railway station (hence the name in Indonesian) in East Jakarta, Jakarta, Indonesia, serving Corridor 11. It is connected with the aforementioned railway station to the northeast, and also to the Bali Mester BRT station that serves southbound Corridor 5 buses.

== History ==
The station was originally named Stasiun Jatinegara 2, bearing number "2" to distinguish itself from Stasiun Jatinegara 1 (now Flyover Jatinegara) station to the east. It was originally located around 110 metres (360 ft) west of the current site. The station commenced operations alongside the opening of Corridor 11 on 28 December 2011.

On 15 April 2022, the station was temporarily closed for revitalization alongside ten other stations across Jakarta, which aimed to create seamless integration between Transjakarta and other transport modes like the KRL Commuterline. The revitalization took more than eight months, and was reopened for a one-week public trial on 28 December 2022, coinciding with the 11th anniversary of the inauguration of Corridor 11. The access bridge to the Jatinegara railway station had not been opened during the trial period. On 4 January 2023, the revitalized Stasiun Jatinegara 2 BRT station and its connection to the railway station was inaugurated by the Mayor of East Jakarta, M. Anwar (representing Heru Budi Hartono, Acting Governor of Jakarta).

In early January 2024, the station was renamed to simply Stasiun Jatinegara, removing the number "2" from its name.

== Building and layout ==
The current building of Stasiun Jatinegara BRT station is a two-storey building with a capacity of up to 1,200 people during rush hours. The upper floor is for the entrance from the footbridge and linkway to the railway station, and also acts as the ticket concourse and commercial area. The lower floor is the platform area and transfer linkway to Bali Mester BRT station. This predominantly beige-colored building has arch-shaped platform bays, similar to those in Tosari and Bundaran HI Astra, with a total of 12 bays (6 for each directions). The station now features a prayer room (musala) and accessible toilets on the platform level.

North	to Pulo Gebang (Flyover Jatinegara) →
Island platform, the doors are opened on the right side of the bus travel direction
South	← (Jatinegara) to Kampung Melayu

== Non-BRT bus services ==
Service type	Route	Destination	Notes
Rental apartment feeder		Rawa Bebek–Bukit Duri	Inside the station
Cross-border feeder (Transjabodetabek)		Bekasi–Galunggung via Becakayu Toll Road	Inside the station
Mikrotrans Jak Lingko	JAK-41	Pulo Gadung–Kampung Melayu	Outside the station
Mikrotrans Jak Lingko	JAK-42	Pondok Kelapa–Kampung Melayu	Outside the station
Mikrotrans Jak Lingko	JAK-106	Klender–Kampung Melayu	Outside the station

== Nearby places ==
- Jatinegara railway station
- Jakarta Gems Center

== Gallery ==
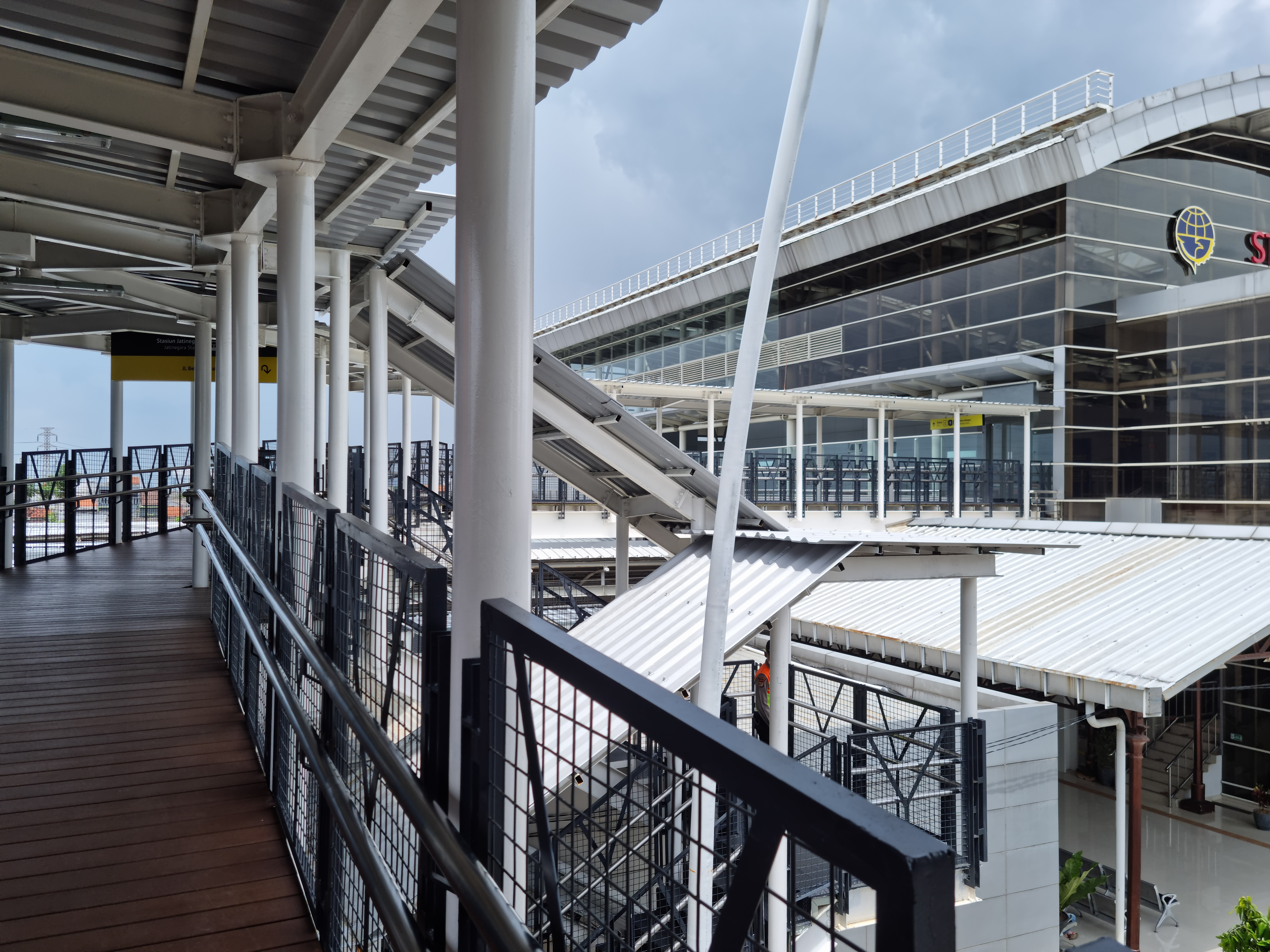
Access between the BRT station and the railway station

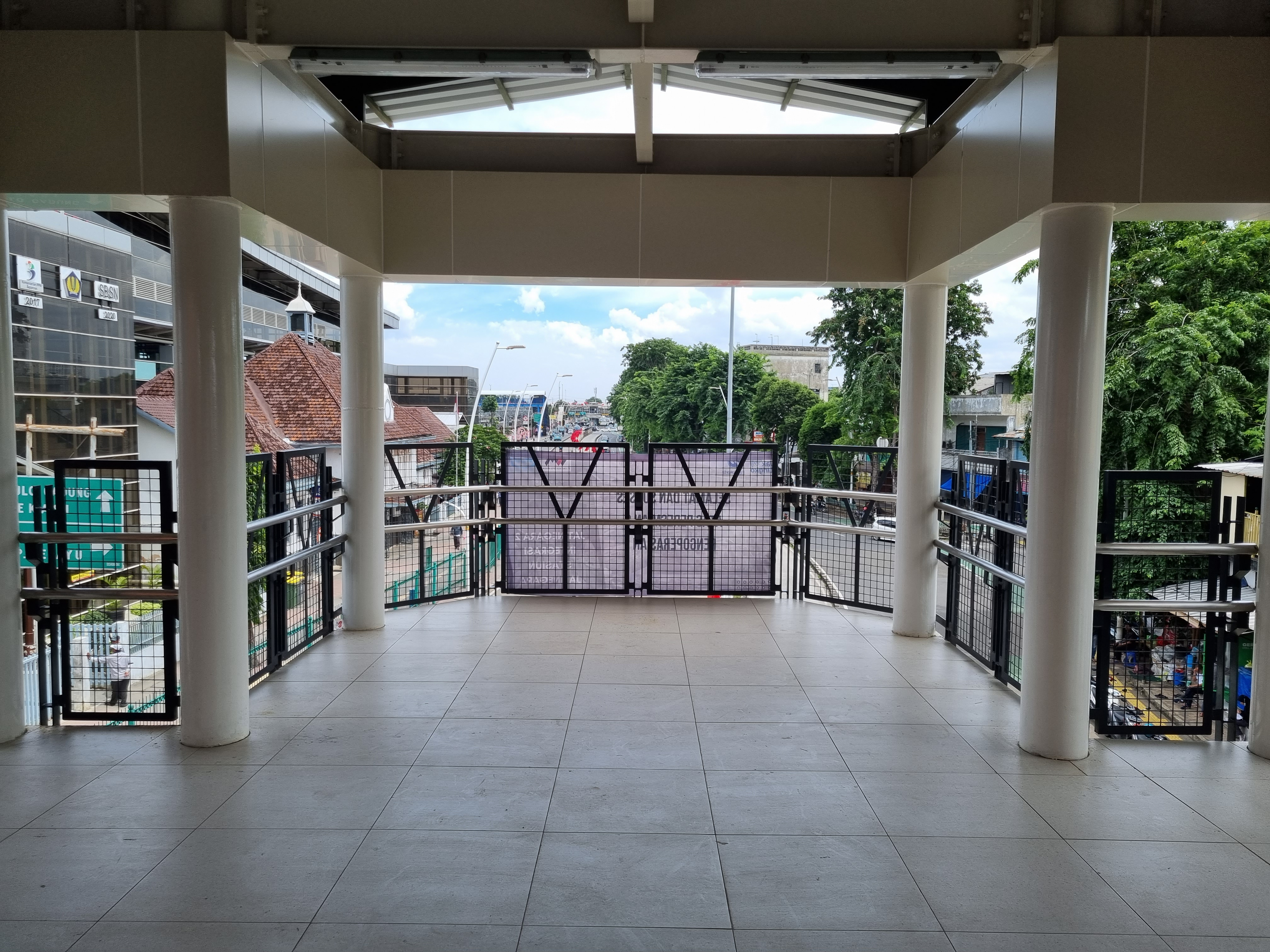
An open-air deck at the eastern end of the building

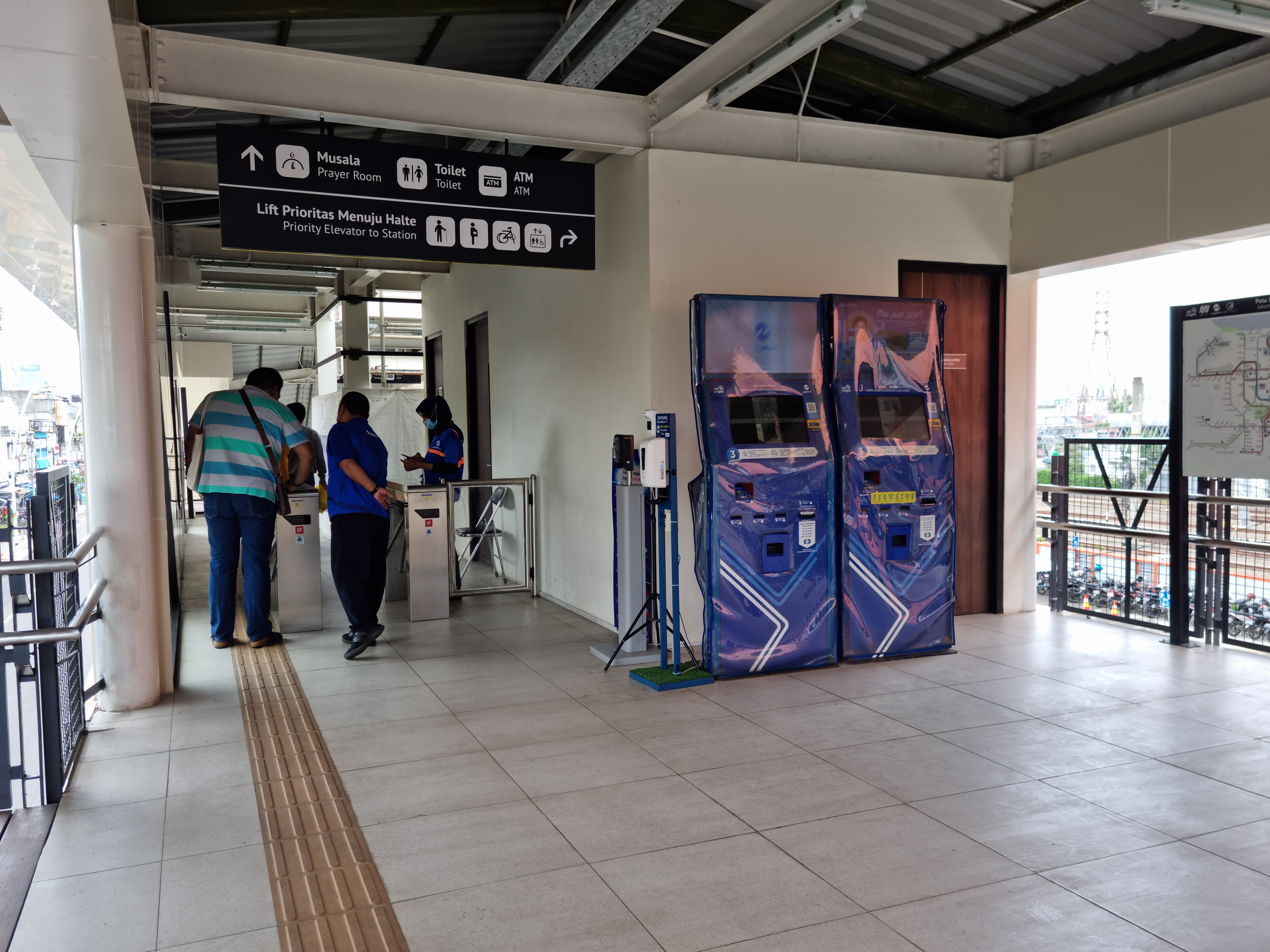
The entrance gate at the upper floor

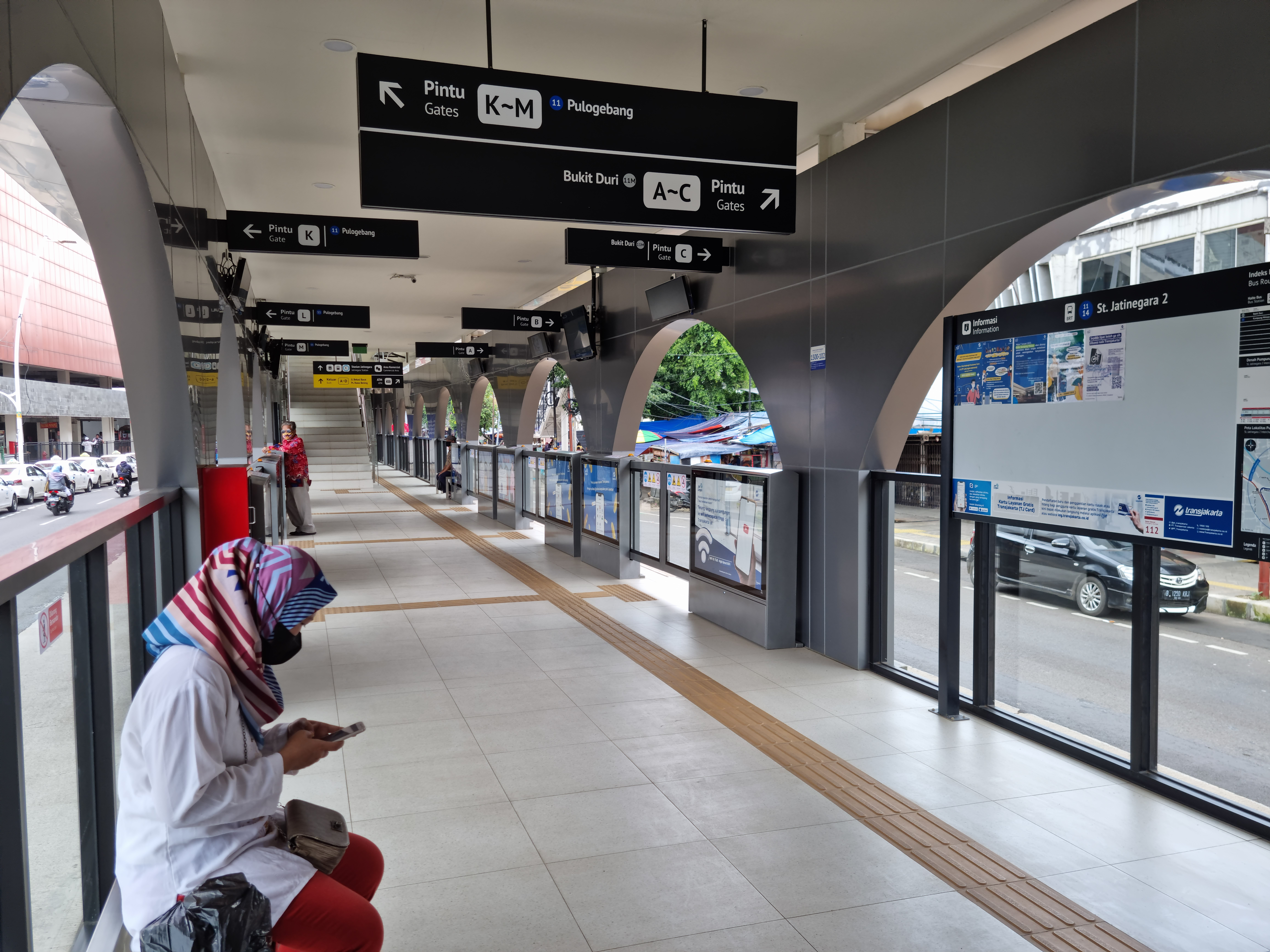
View of the platform area

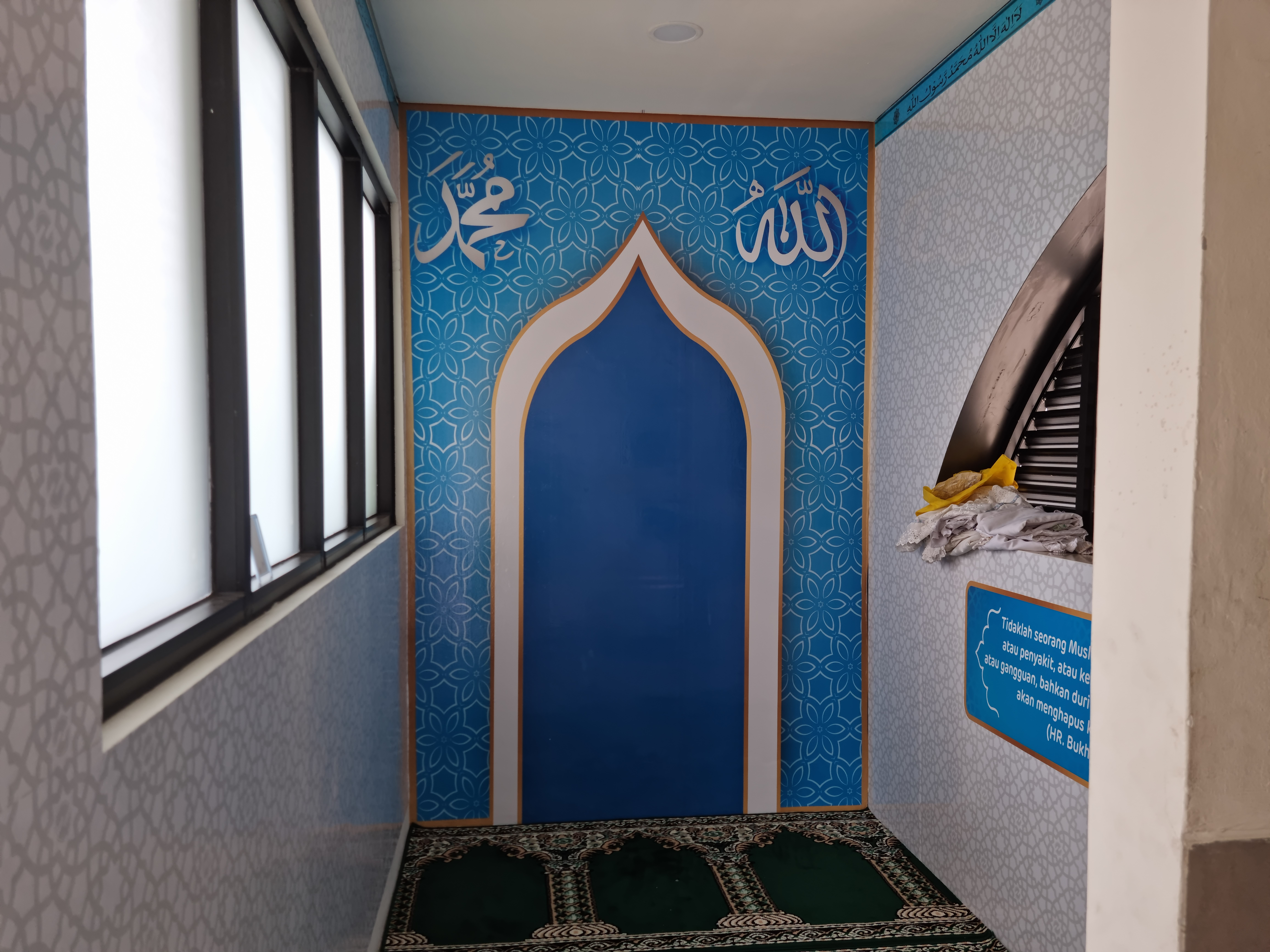
A dedicated room (musala) for Islamic players (salat)
