= Bali Mester (Transjakarta) =

Bus rapid transit station in Jakarta, Indonesia

5 16 Bali Mester
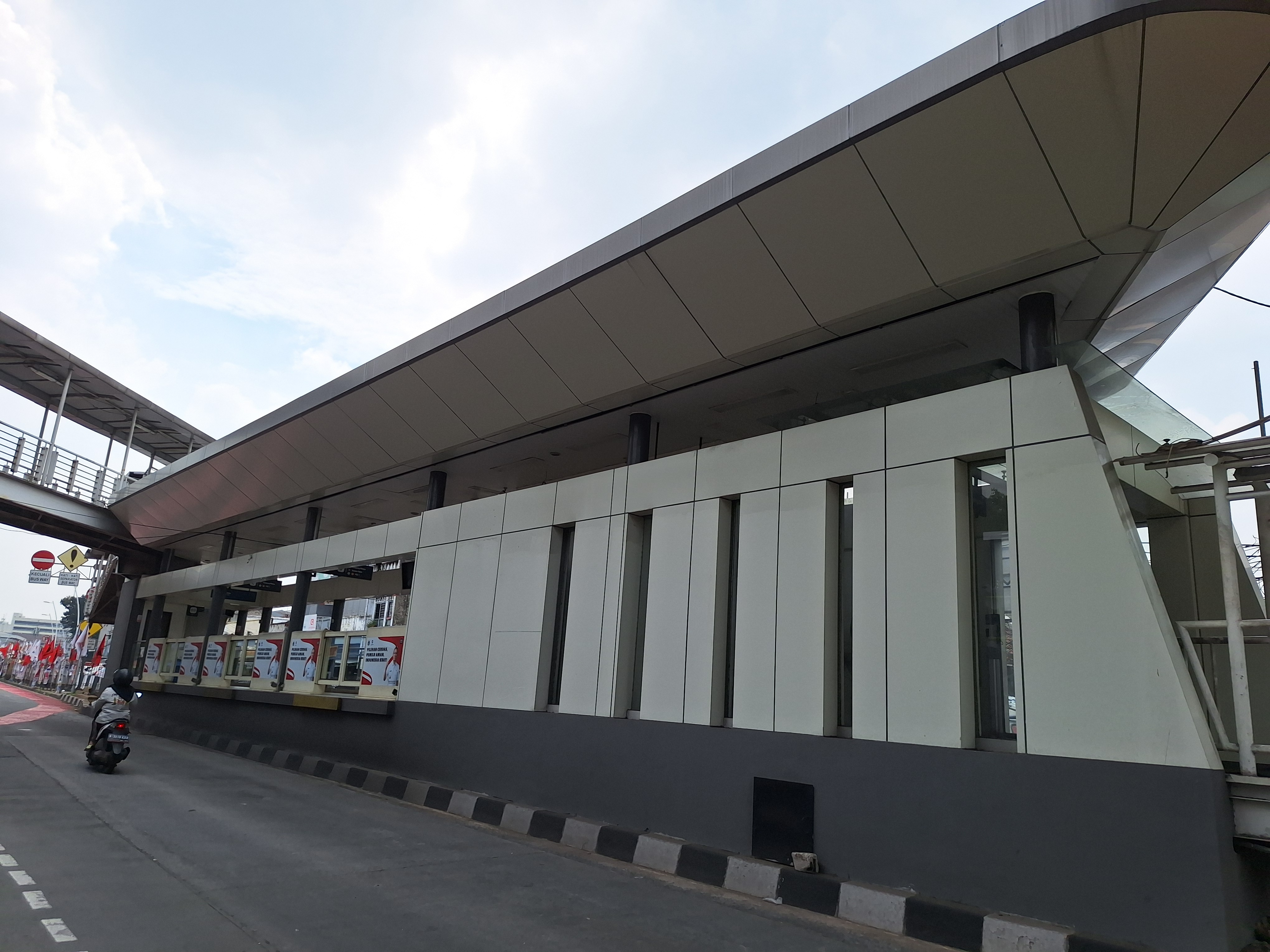

General information
- Location: Jatinegara Timur Street, Bali Mester, Jatinegara, East Jakarta 13310, Indonesia
- Coordinates: 6.2157°S 106.8662°E
- System: Transjakarta bus rapid transit station
- Owner: Transjakarta
- Operator: Transjakarta
- Lines: List of Transjakarta corridors#Corridor 5 List of Transjakarta corridors#Cross-corridor routes
- Platforms: Single side platform
- Connections: Stasiun Jatinegara; Jatinegara

Construction
- Structure type: At-grade
- Cycle facilities: No
- Accessible: No

Other information
- Status: In service

History
- Opened: 27 January 2007

Services
Preceding		Following
Matraman Baru One-way operation	Corridor 5	Jatinegara towards Kampung Melayu
Matraman Baru One-way operation	Corridor 5 Route 5C	Jatinegara towards Cililitan
Flyover Jatinegara One-way operation	Corridor 11 transfer at Stasiun Jatinegara	Jatinegara towards Kampung Melayu
Flyover Jatinegara towards Pulo Gebang	Corridor 11 transfer at Stasiun Jatinegara	Kampung Melayu One-way operation
Location

Bali Mester is a Transjakarta bus rapid transit station located on Jatinegara Timur Street, Bali Mester, Jatinegara, East Jakarta, Indonesia, serving southbound Corridor 5 buses. The station is connected to Stasiun Jatinegara station that serves Corridor 11, which itself is connected to Jatinegara railway station that serves the KRL Commuterline and intercity train services. The station is named after the subdistrict it is located in.

== History ==
The station opened as Pasar Jatinegara with the rest of Corridor 5 on 27 January 2007. Prior to revitalisation works, the station had a small building with 3 gates on the eastern side. The skybridge design was complex as it was located at the junction where Jatinegara Timur and Bekasi Barat Streets intersect. The skybridge to exit to both sides of the Matraman Raya Street was located on the eastern side, while the other skybridge was used as a transfer linkway to Corridor 11.

On 6 September 2022, the station was closed for revitalisation works. It reopened on 15 February 2023. In late December 2023, it was renamed to Bali Mester.

== Building and layout ==
After revitalisation works, the new station is bigger and has an open-air design. Due to the limited space, there is only a toilet without a prayer room, although passengers may use the prayer room at Corridor 11 station (which also got revitalised). The transfer linkway was rebuilt and only reopened months after the station reopened.

East
Side platform, doors open on the right hand side
West	← (Jatinegara) towards Kampung Melayu and towards Cililitan

== Non-BRT bus services ==
The following is the list of non-BRT bus services that serve the station or areas around the station, last updated on 11 June 2026:

Type	Route	Destination	Notes
		Tebet Station → Bidara Cina	Inside the station
		Tanah Abang Station—Kampung Melayu via Cikini	Outside the station
		Bukit Duri—Rawa Bebek Housing Complex	Outside the station
		Pulo Gebang—Kampung Melayu via BKT	Outside the station
Jakarta Fair feeder		JIEXPO Kemayoran → Kampung Melayu	Only operates during the Jakarta Fair and/or other events at the JIEXPO Kemayoran Inside the station
Mikrotrans Jak Lingko	JAK 106	Kampung Melayu Terminal—Klender Terminal	Outside the station

== Places nearby ==
- Jatinegara Market
- Ciplaz Jatinegara

== Gallery ==
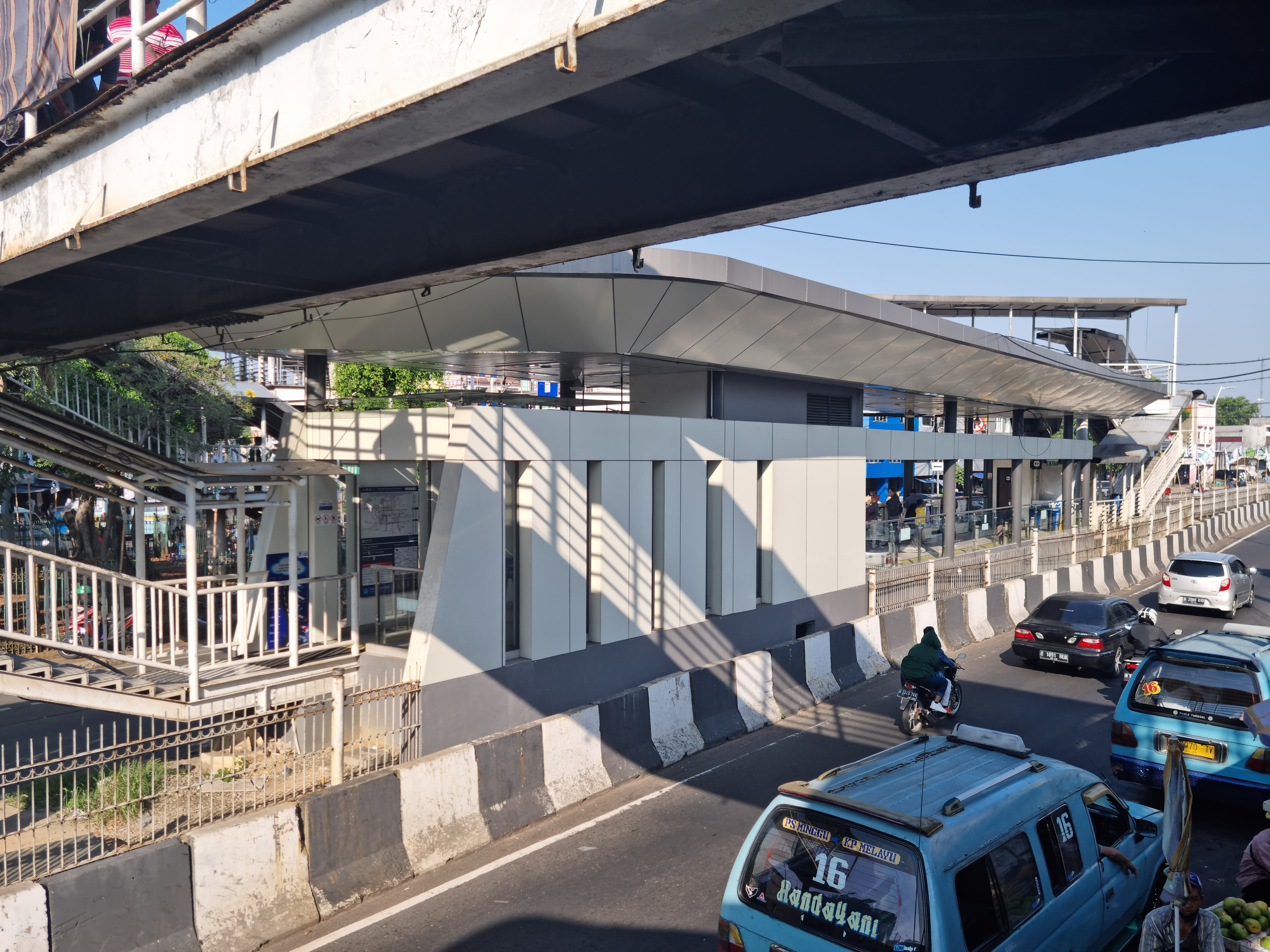
View from the skybridge, 2023

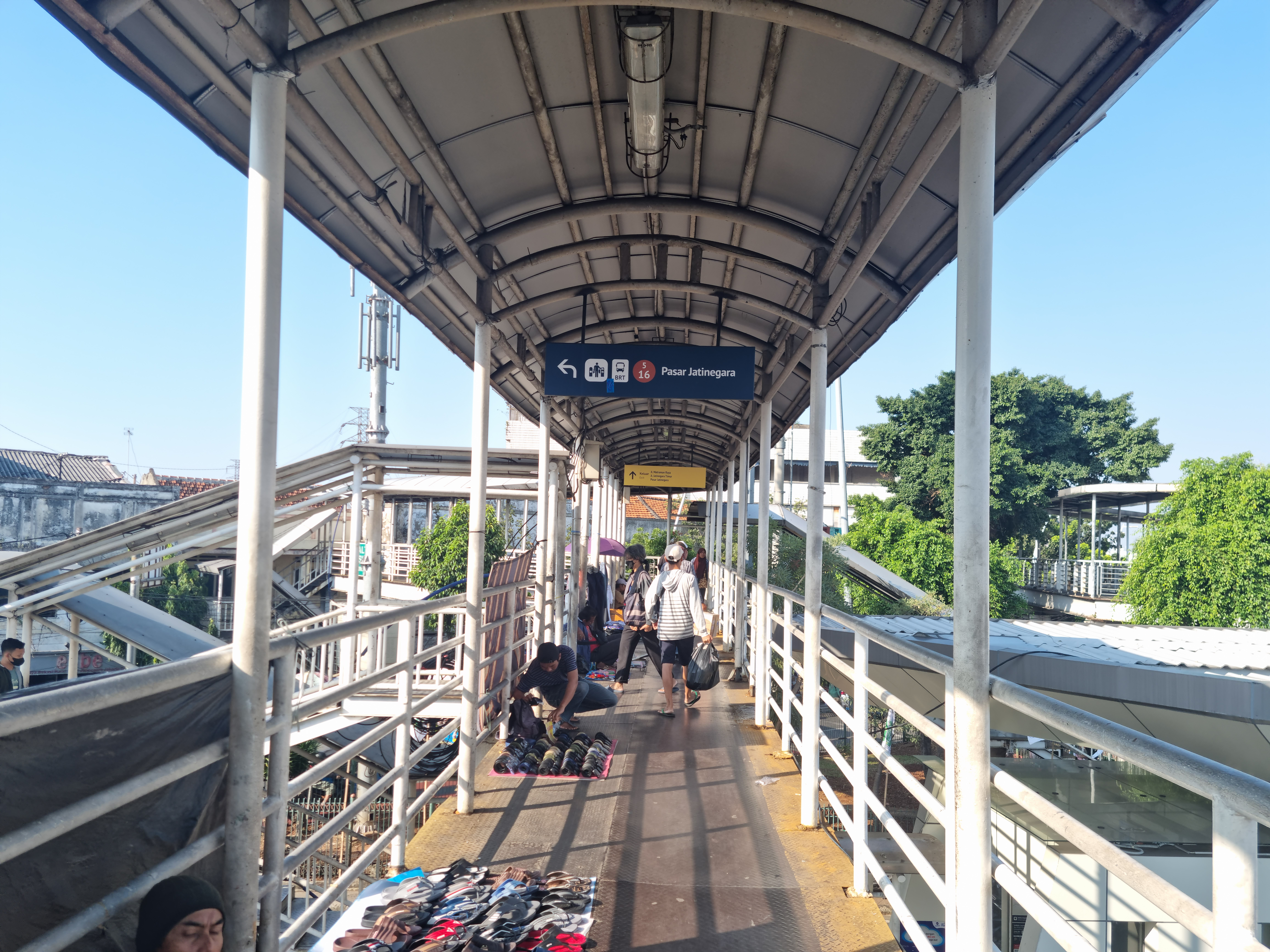
Access skybridge to the station with its old name, 2023

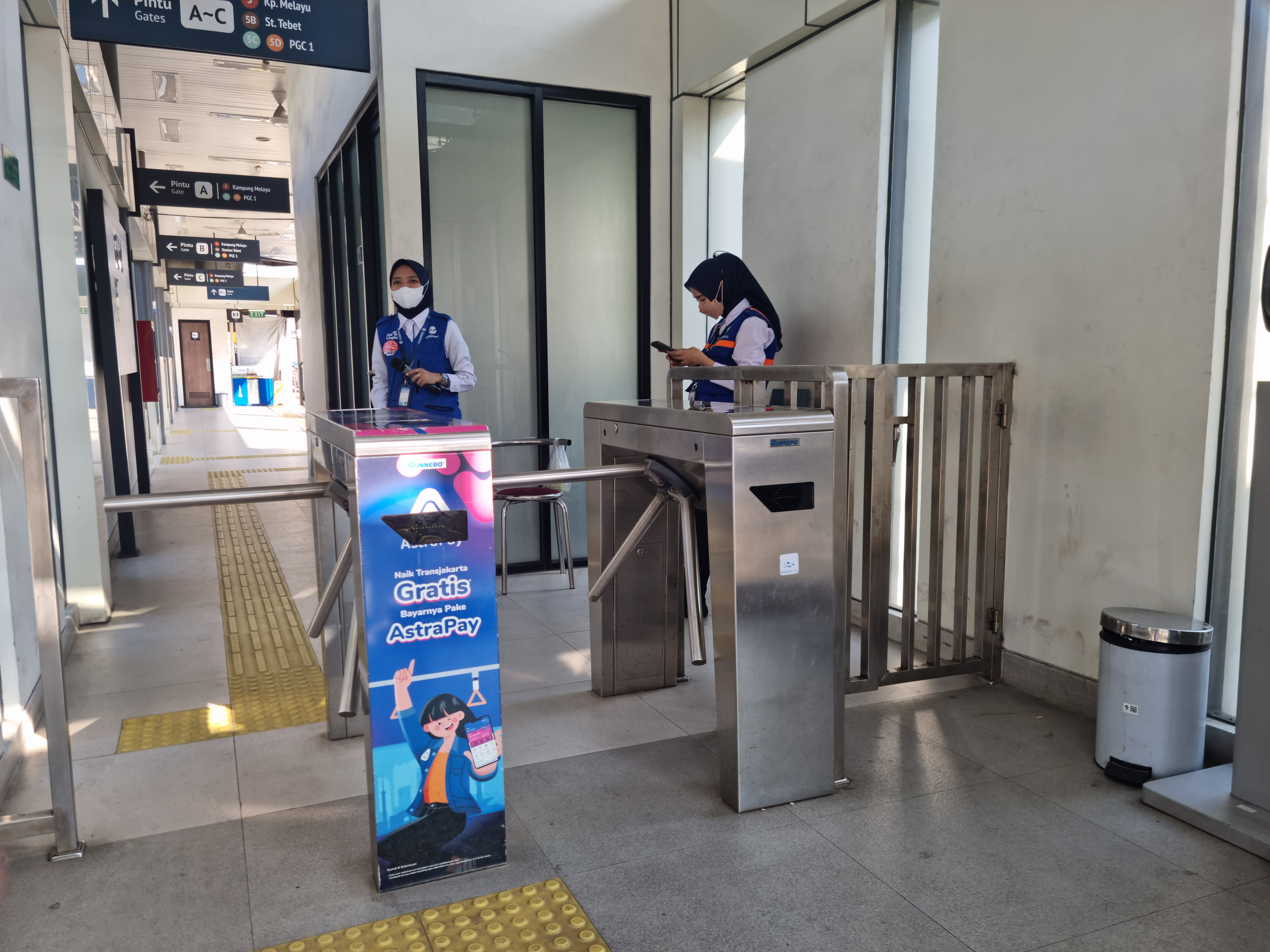
Entrance/exit turnstiles, 2023

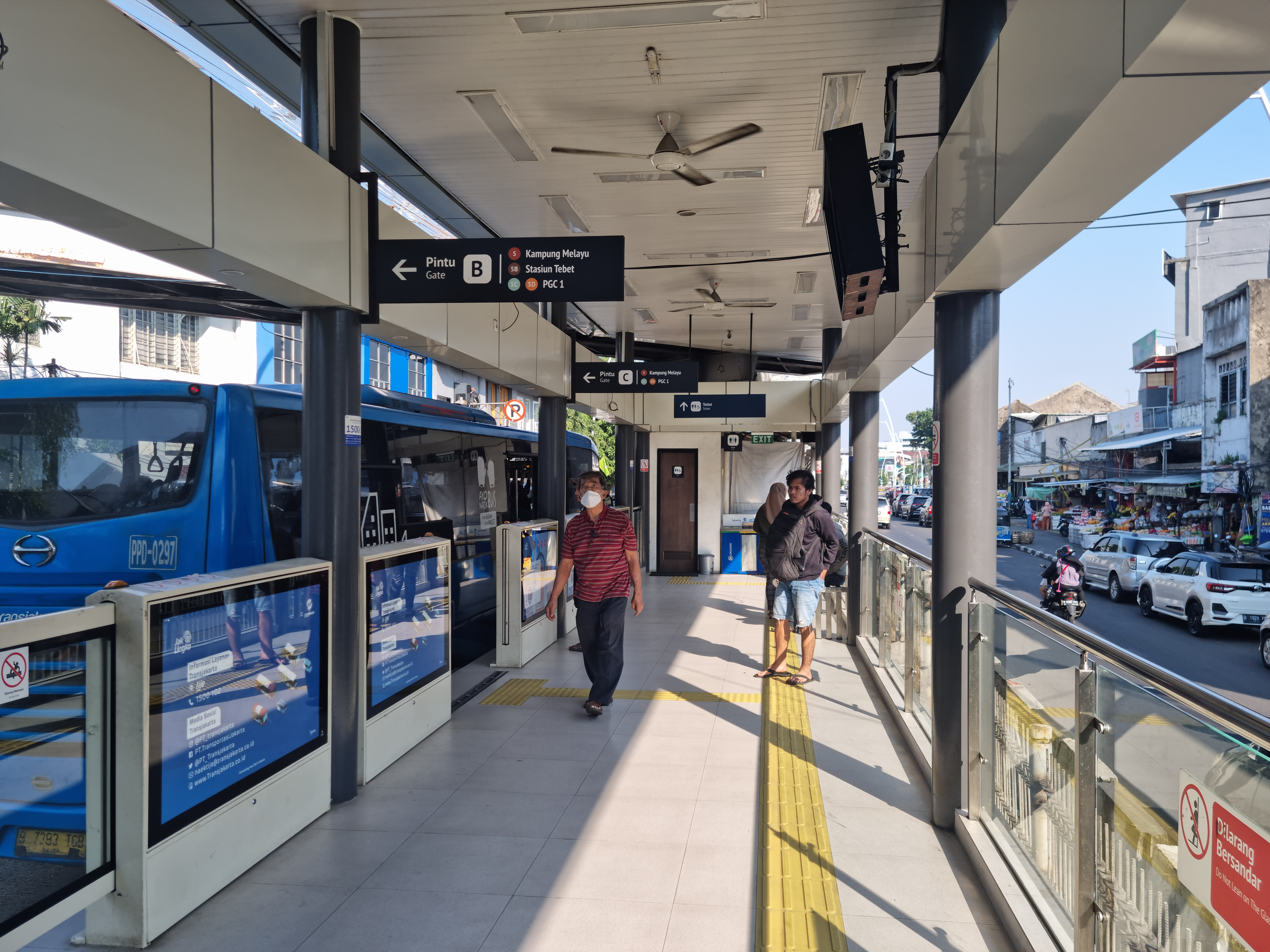
View of the platform area, 2023

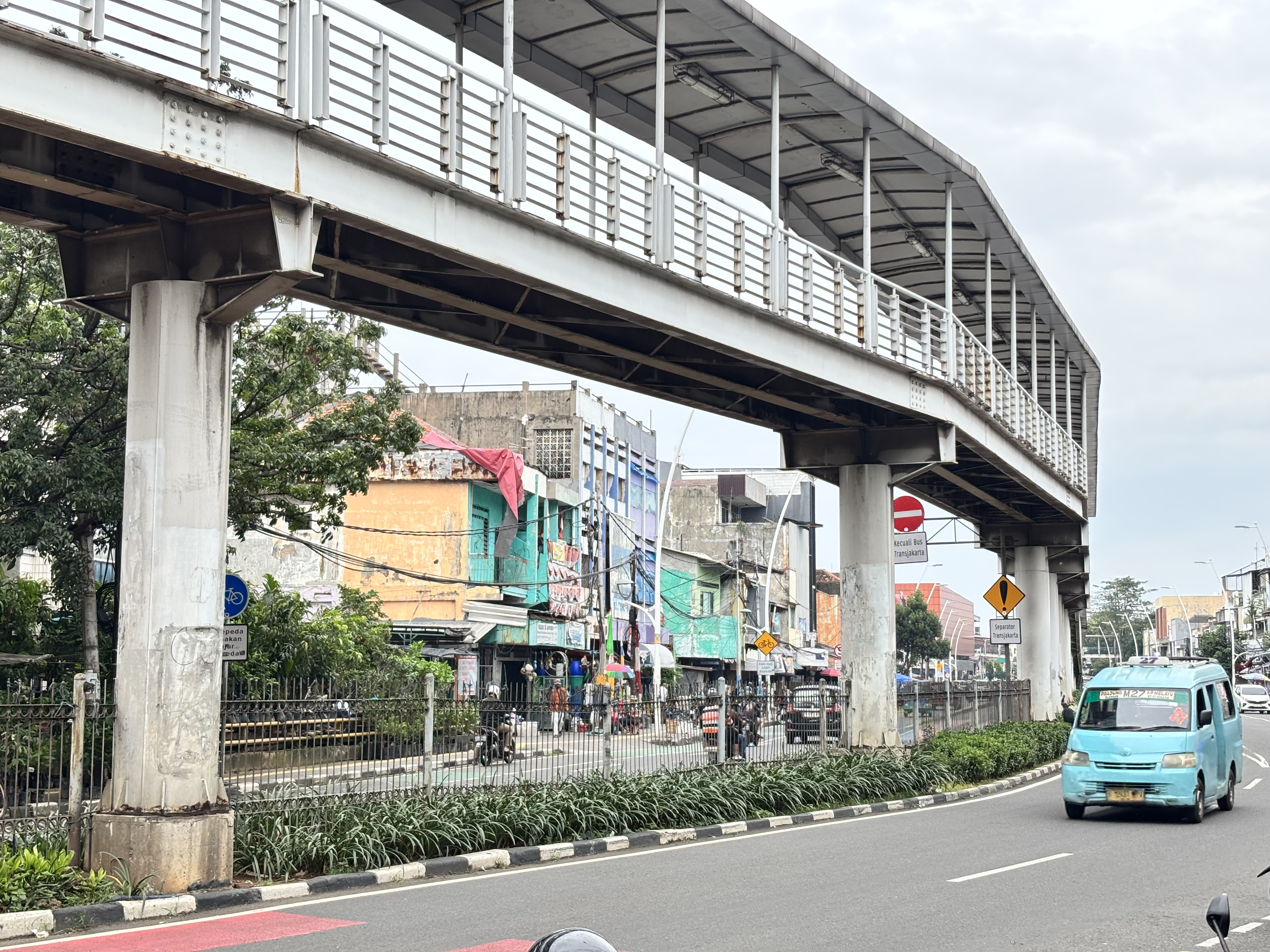
Transfer linkway to Corridor 11, 2025
