= Jatinegara (Transjakarta) =

Bus rapid transit station in Jakarta, Indonesia

5 17 11 15 Jatinegara
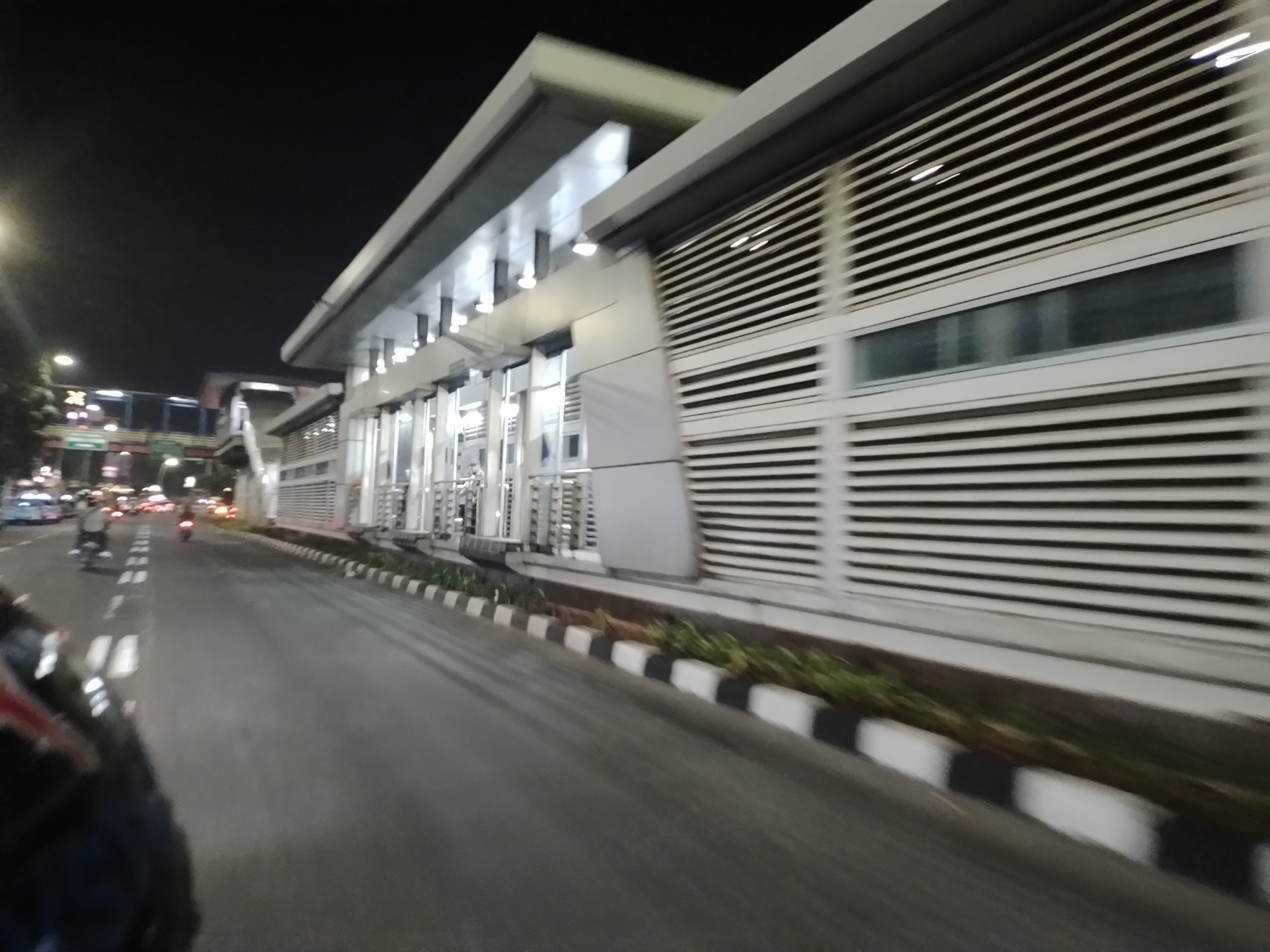

General information
- Location: Jatinegara Timur Street, Bali Mester, Jatinegara, East Jakarta 13310, Indonesia
- Coordinates: 6.2305578°S 106.868008°E
- System: Transjakarta bus rapid transit station
- Owner: Transjakarta
- Operator: Transjakarta
- Lines: List of Transjakarta corridors#Corridor 5 List of Transjakarta corridors#Cross-corridor routes List of TransJakarta corridors#Corridor 11
- Platforms: Single side platform

Construction
- Structure type: At-grade
- Cycle facilities: No
- Accessible: No

Other information
- Status: In service

History
- Opened: 28 December 2011
- Former names: Jatinegara RS Premier

Services
Preceding		Following
Bali Mester One-way operation	Corridor 5	Kampung Melayu Terminus
Bali Mester One-way operation	Corridor 5 Route 5C	Kampung Melayu towards Cililitan
Stasiun Jatinegara One-way operation	Corridor 11	Kampung Melayu Terminus
Location

Jatinegara (formerly Jatinegara RS Premier) is a Transjakarta bus rapid transit station located on Jatinegara Timur Street, Bali Mester, Jatinegara, East Jakarta, Indonesia, serving southbound Corridors 5 and 11 buses. It is located in the Jatinegara district, right in front of Jatinegara Premier Hospital (hence its former name).

== History ==
The station was built alongside Corridor 11 and opened on 28 December 2011. Since then, Corridor 5 eventually made a stop here.

The station's working name was RS Mitra, but was later changed to Jatinegara RS Premier after the Mitra hospital was rebranded to Premier Hospital (Rumah Sakit (RS) Premier). However, in late December 2023, the station was renamed again to simply Jatinegara, in order to "neutralise" the station name from unofficial use of third-party name (in this case, a hospital).

== Building and layout ==
The station has a long, east-facing narrow platform. The road is one-way southbound only, so the station serves only southbound buses. It has three gates. The station can be accessed through a skybridge that is located at the southern end of the station. The following are the BRT services serving the station, last updated on 1 March 2025:

West
Side platform, doors open on the right hand side
East	← (Kp. Melayu) towards Kampung Melayu and towards Cililitan

== Non-BRT bus services ==
The following is the list of non-BRT bus services that serve the station or the areas surrounding it, last updated on 11 June 2026:

Type	Route	Destination	Notes
Inner city feeder		Tebet Station → Bidara Cina	Inside the station
Inner city feeder		Kampung Melayu → Pulo Gebang via BKT	Outside the station
Jakarta Fair feeder		JIEXPO Kemayoran → Kampung Melayu	Only operates during the Jakarta Fair and/or other events at JIEXPO Kemayoran. Inside the station
Cross-border feeder (Transjabodetabek)		Bekasi → Galunggung via Becakayu Toll Road	inside the station
Mikrotrans Jak Lingko	JAK 41	Pulo Gadung—Kampung Melayu Terminal	Outside the station
Mikrotrans Jak Lingko	JAK 42	Kampung Melayu Terminal—Pondok Kelapa	Outside the station
Mikrotrans Jak Lingko	JAK 84	Kampung Melayu Terminal—Kapin Raya	Outside the station
Mikrotrans Jak Lingko	JAK 106	Klender Terminal—Kampung Melayu Terminal	Outside the station

== Incidents ==
On 28 January 2020, a female Transjakarta staff member collapsed and died during her shift. It was later known that she had been asked to do a medical check-up, but refused to do so. She collapsed in front of the ticket gates and was later taken to the hospital but declared dead.

On 24 October 2025, an articulated bus hit movable concrete barriers (MCBs) placed in front of the station. The cause of the incident was unknown.

== Gallery ==
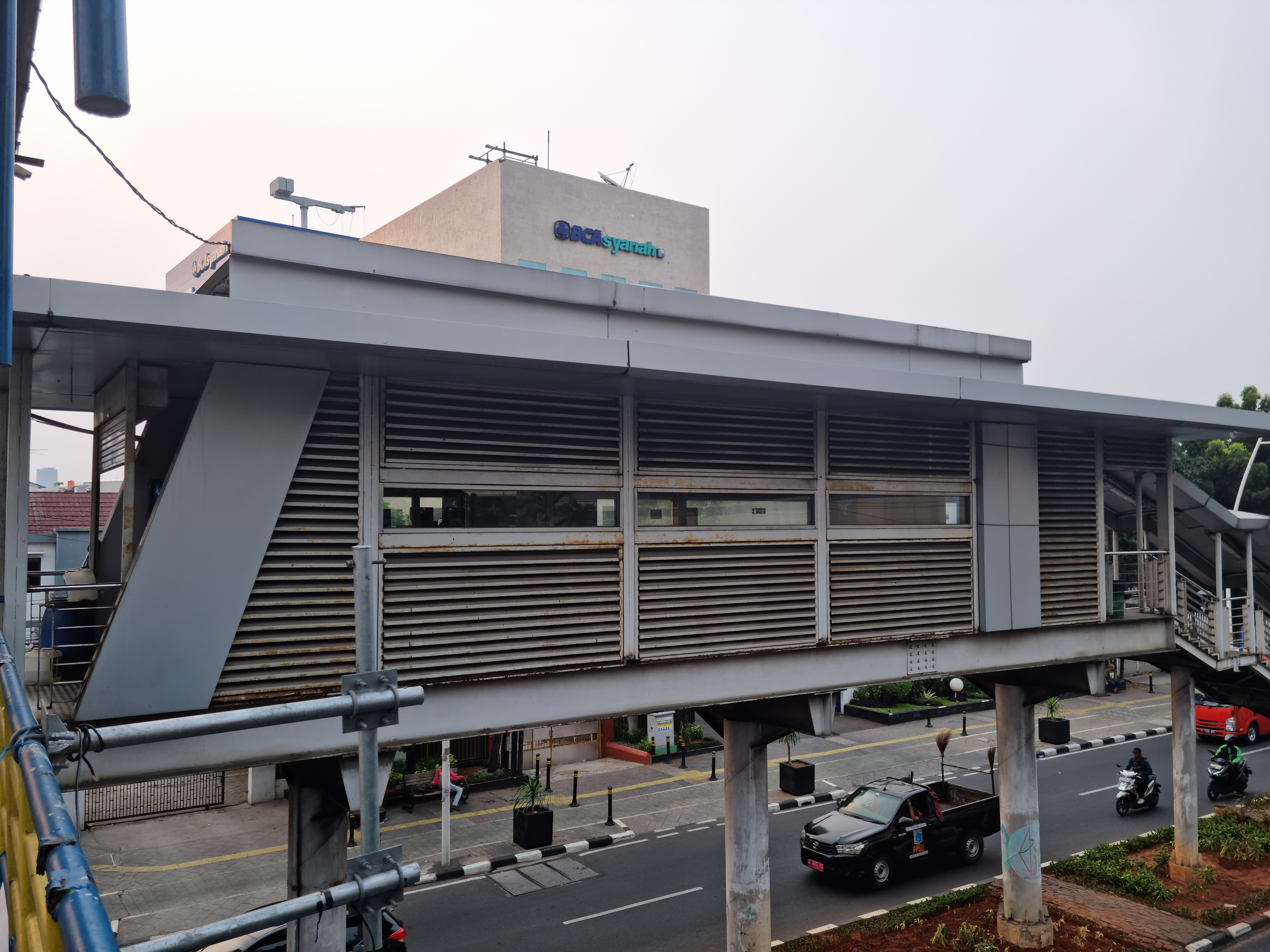
Concourse building located above the platform building, 2023

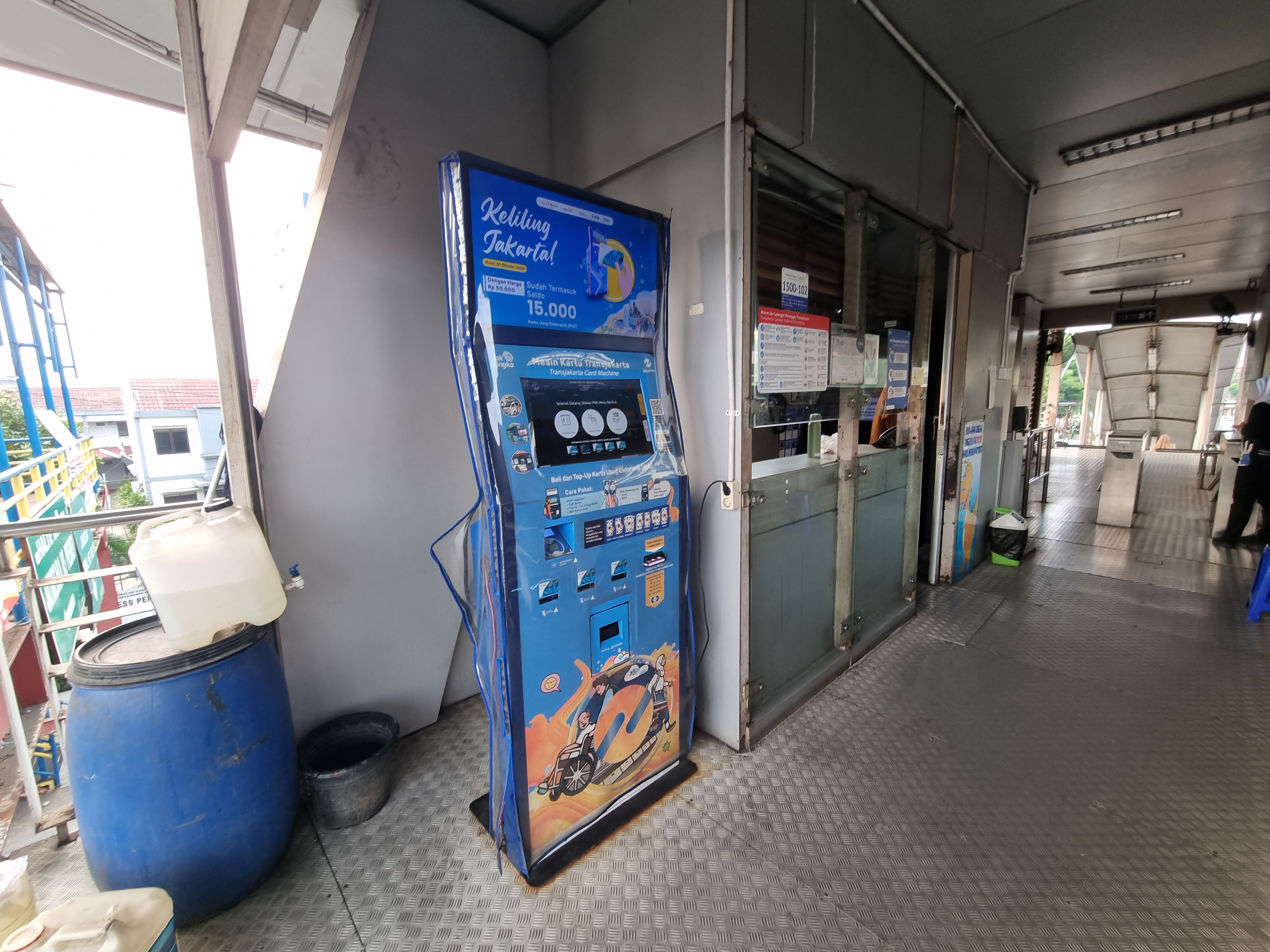
Ticket vending machine at the concourse, 2023

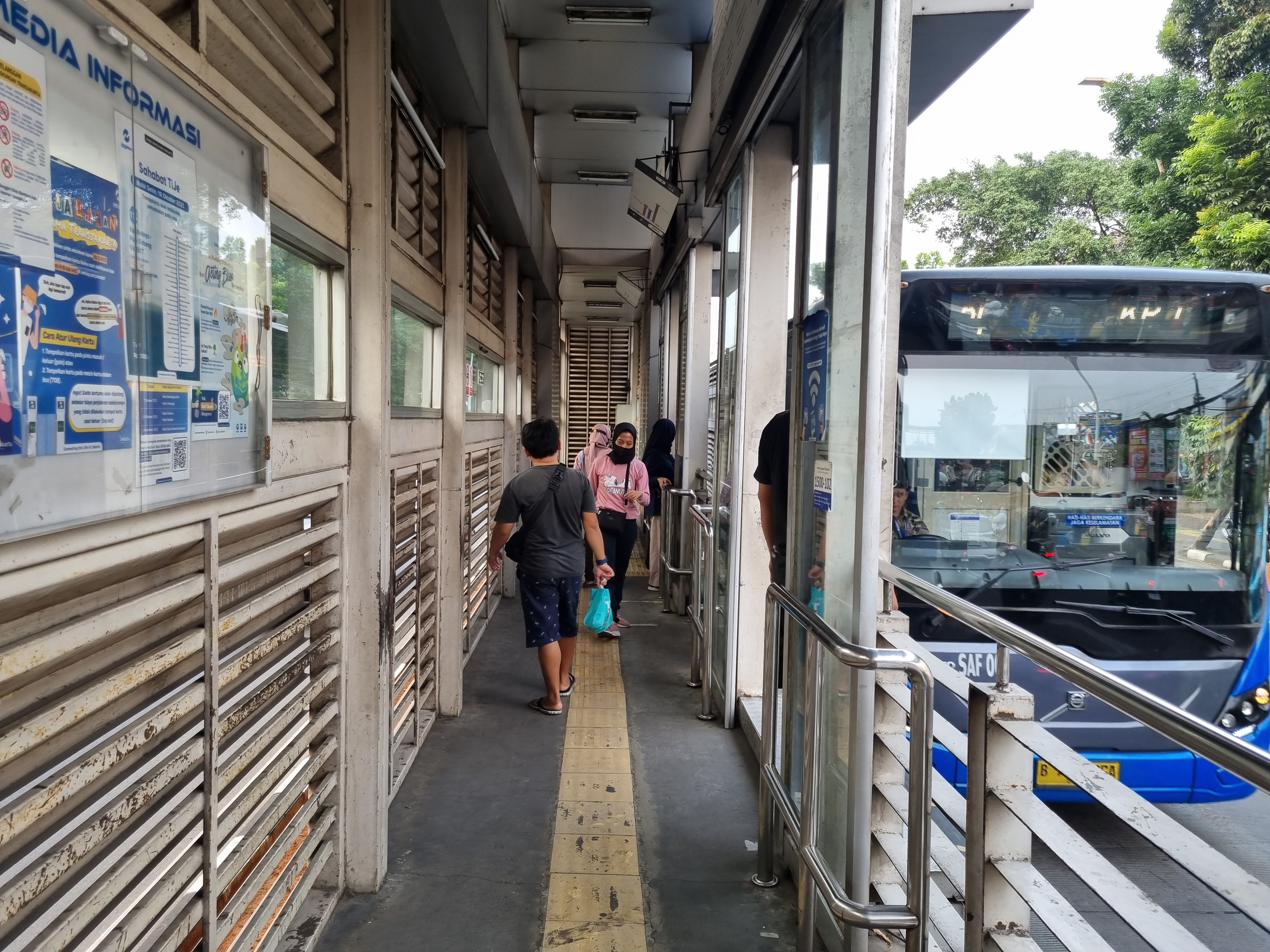
View of the platform area, 2023
