= Matraman Baru (Transjakarta) =

Bus rapid transit station in Jakarta, Indonesia

5 15 Matraman Baru
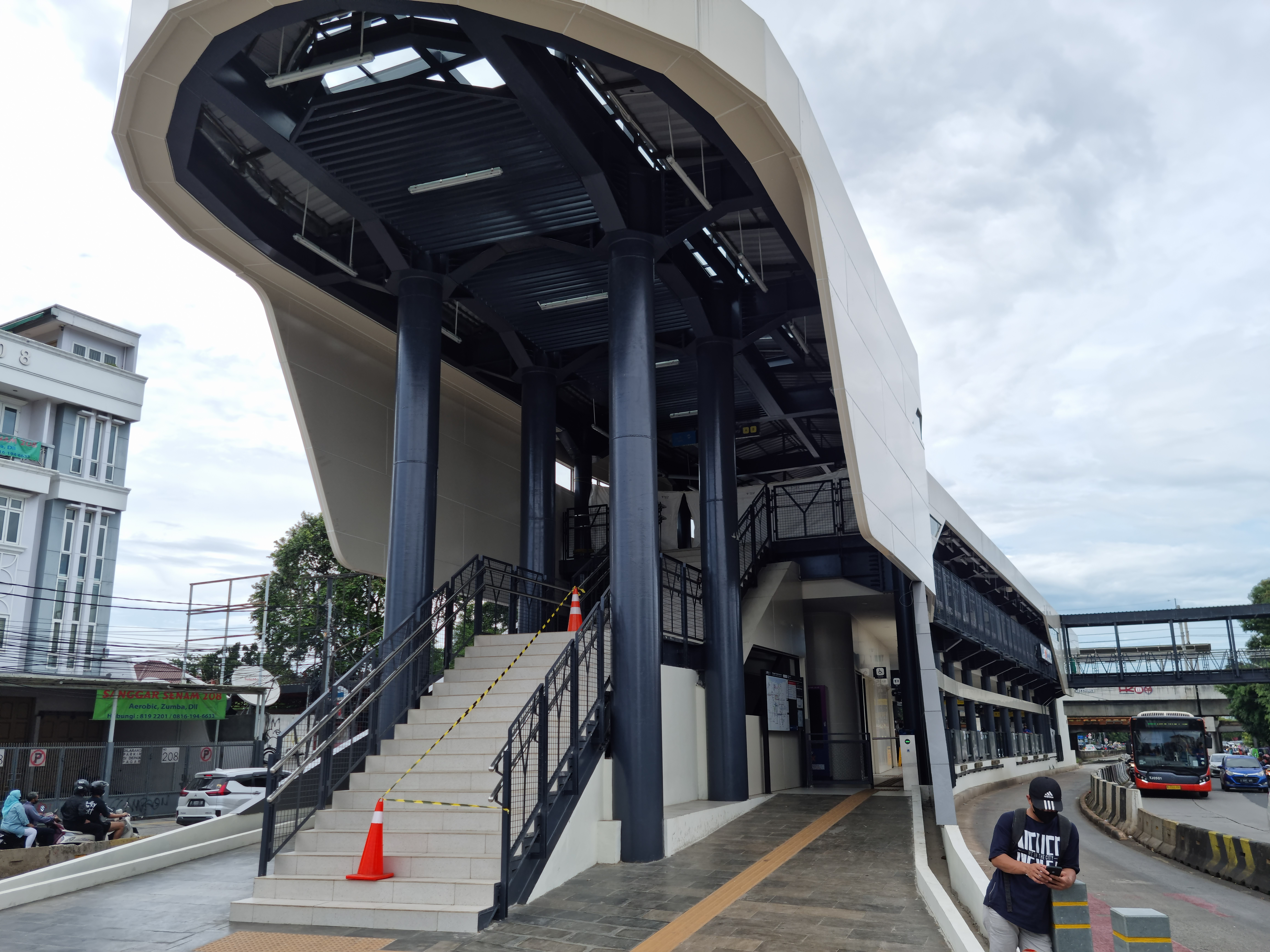
- Entrance at the southern end of the building

General information
- Location: Matraman Raya St., Bali Mester, Jatinegara, East Jakarta, Jakarta, Indonesia
- Coordinates: 6.2127°S 106.8610°E
- System: Transjakarta
- Owner: Transjakarta
- Operator: Transjakarta
- Lines: List of Transjakarta corridors#Corridor 5 List of Transjakarta corridors#Cross-corridor routes
- Platforms: Single island platform
- Connections: Matraman

Construction
- Structure type: At-grade
- Accessible: Yes

History
- Opened: 27 January 2007
- Rebuilt: 2022
- Former names: Kebon Pala

Services
Preceding		Following
Kesatrian One-way operation	Corridor 5	Bali Mester towards Kampung Melayu
Kesatrian towards Ancol	Corridor 5	Kampung Melayu One-way operation
Kesatrian One-way operation	Corridor 5 Route 5C	Bali Mester towards Cililitan
Kesatrian towards Juanda	Corridor 5 Route 5C	Kampung Melayu One-way operation
Location

Matraman Baru (formerly Kebon Pala) is a Transjakarta bus rapid transit station located at the southern end of Matraman Raya street in Bali Mester, Jatinegara, East Jakarta, Indonesia, serving Corridor 5. It is connected with the Matraman railway station to the northwest, and located adjacent with the historic Koinonia Protestant Church to the south.

== History ==
Matraman Baru BRT station was originally named Kebon Pala (lit. 'Nutmeg plantation'), named after a highly-densed settlement or kampung of the same name in the Ciliwung River bank to the southwest, which is prone to flooding; the name can also refer to an administrative village (kelurahan) in the Makasar district of East Jakarta. The BRT station alone was opened alongside the inauguration of Corridor 5 on 27 January 2007.

On 15 April 2022, Kebon Pala BRT station was temporarily closed for revitalization, alongside 10 other stations across Jakarta. For Kebon Pala, the revitalization sought an integration between Corridor 5 with the newly opened Matraman railway station of the KRL Cikarang Loop Line. On 22 December 2022, the BRT station was reopened with a new name, Matraman Baru, although some new amenities were not finished at the reopening day, including the transfer bridge to the railway station that was finished sometime around 2023.

== Building and layout ==
Matraman Baru BRT station has been upgraded into a two-storey building, with the upper floor for the commercial area and transfer access to the Matraman railway station. It has two entrances: the main entrance is in the southern end of the building with a staircase to access the second floor (similar design to M.H. Thamrin station) and accessible via zebra crossings; the secondary entrance is via footbridge to the north, which provide direct connection to Matraman station. New amenities like a prayer room (musala) and disabled-friendly toilets are provided in the lower floor, located in the main entrance.

West	to Juanda	to Ancol (Kesatrian) →
Island platform, the doors are opened on the right side of the bus travel direction
East	← (Bali Mester) to Kampung Melayu	to Cililitan

== Non-BRT bus services ==
Service type	Route	Destination	Notes
Jakarta Fair feeder		Kampung Melayu–JIEXPO Kemayoran	Only operates during the Jakarta Fair and/or other events in the Jakarta International Expo. Inside the station
Inner city feeder		Kampung Melayu–Tanah Abang via Cikini	Outside the station
Inner city feeder		Cibubur → Ancol	Inside the station
Cross-border feeder (Transjabodetabek)		Bekasi–Galunggung via Becakayu Toll Road	Inside the station
Mikrotrans Jak Lingko	JAK-88	Manggarai–Rawamangun	Outside the station

== Nearby places ==
- Koinonia Protestant Church
- Jatinegara Animal Market

== Gallery ==
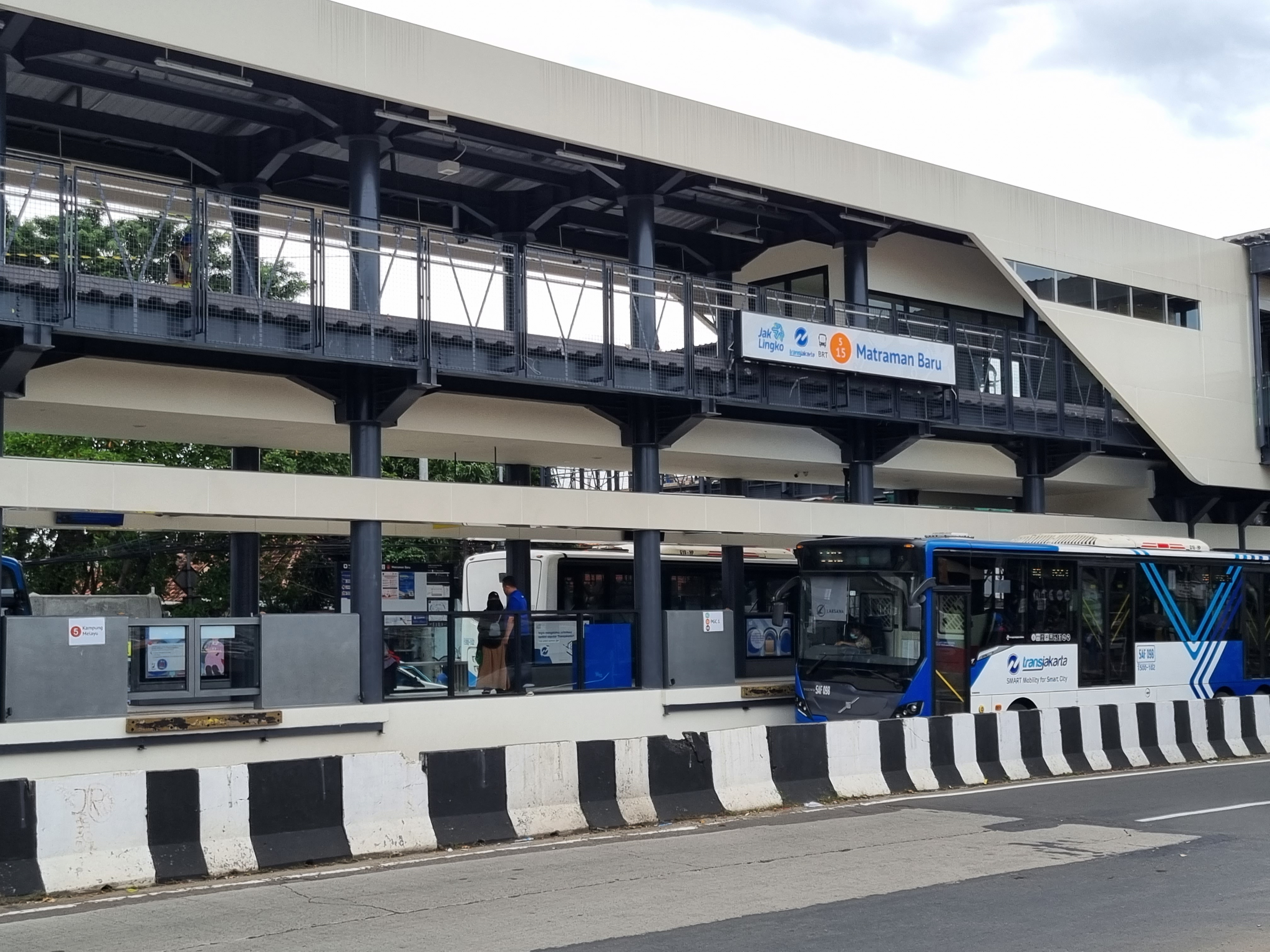
Side view of the station

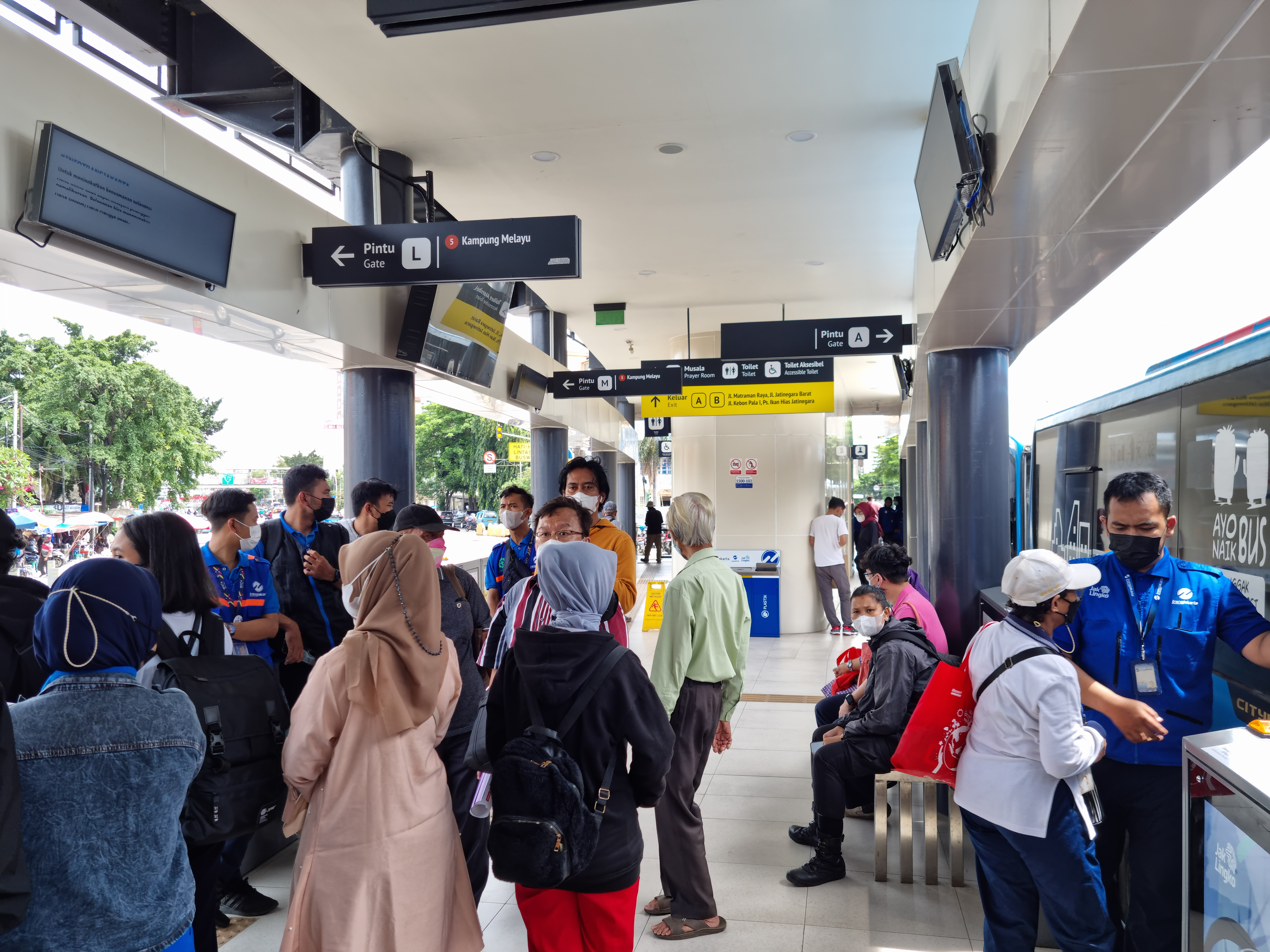
View of the platform area

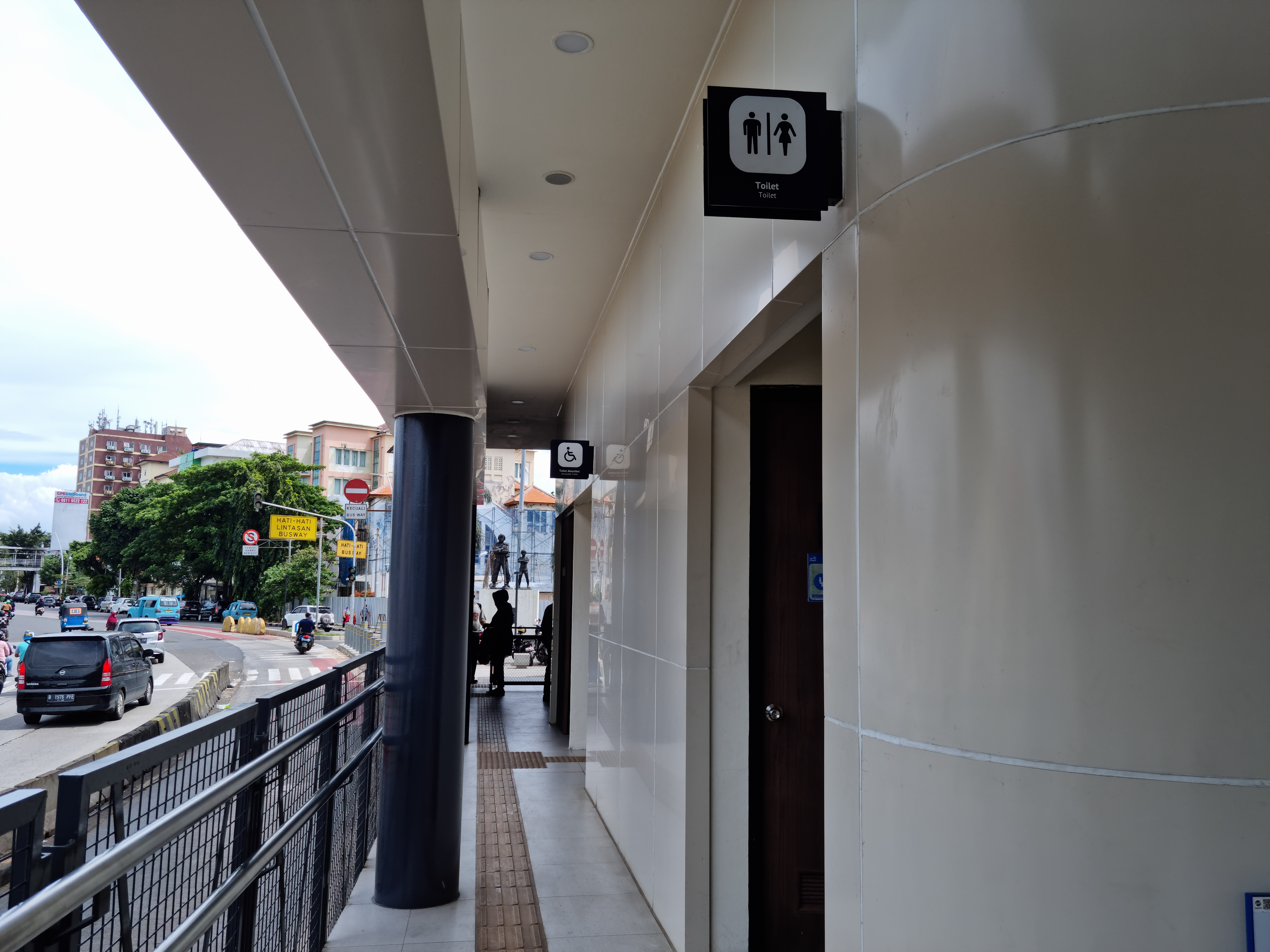
The regular and accessible toilets are located near the south entrance

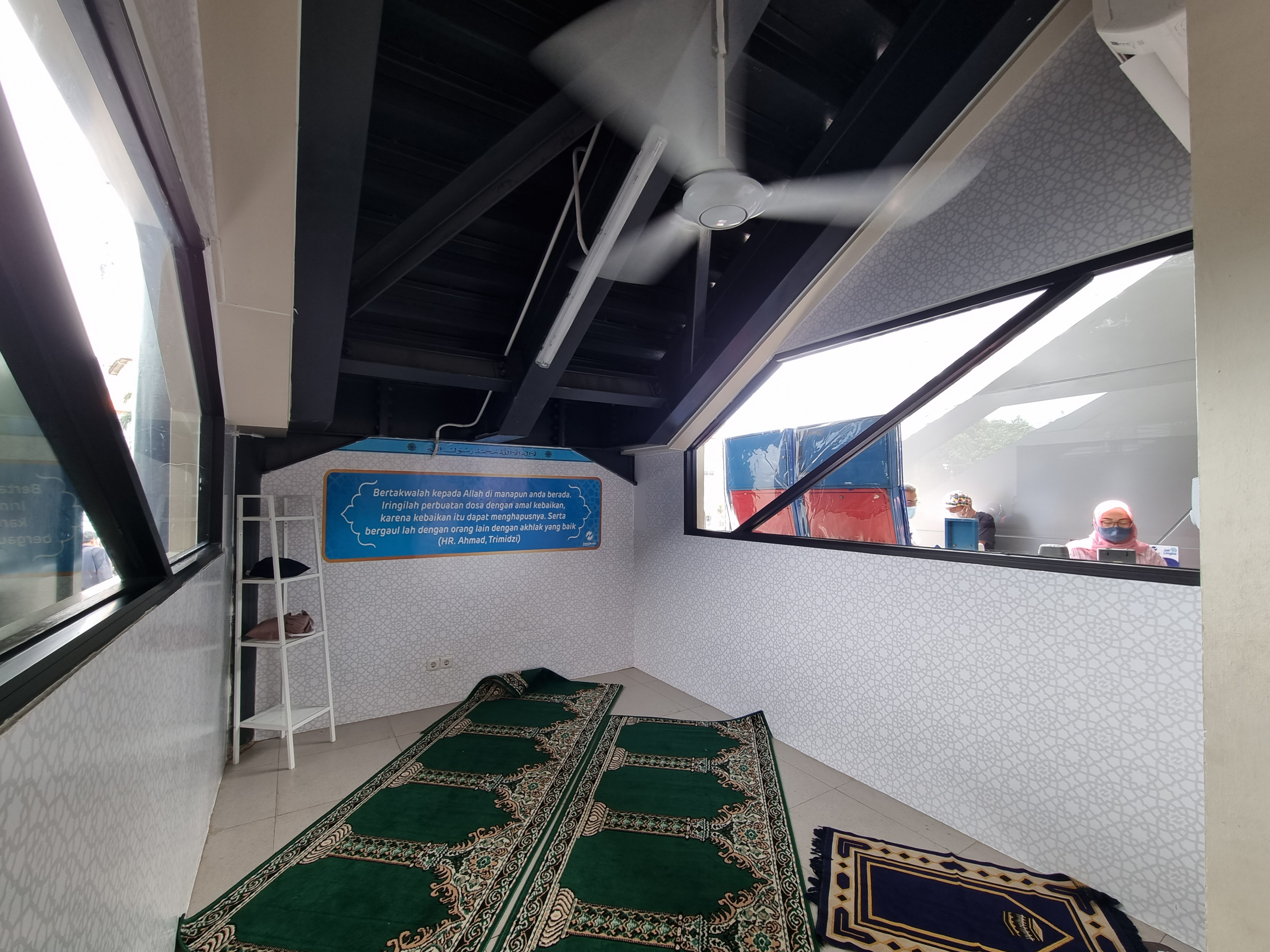
A prayer room (musala) below the staircase at the south entrance

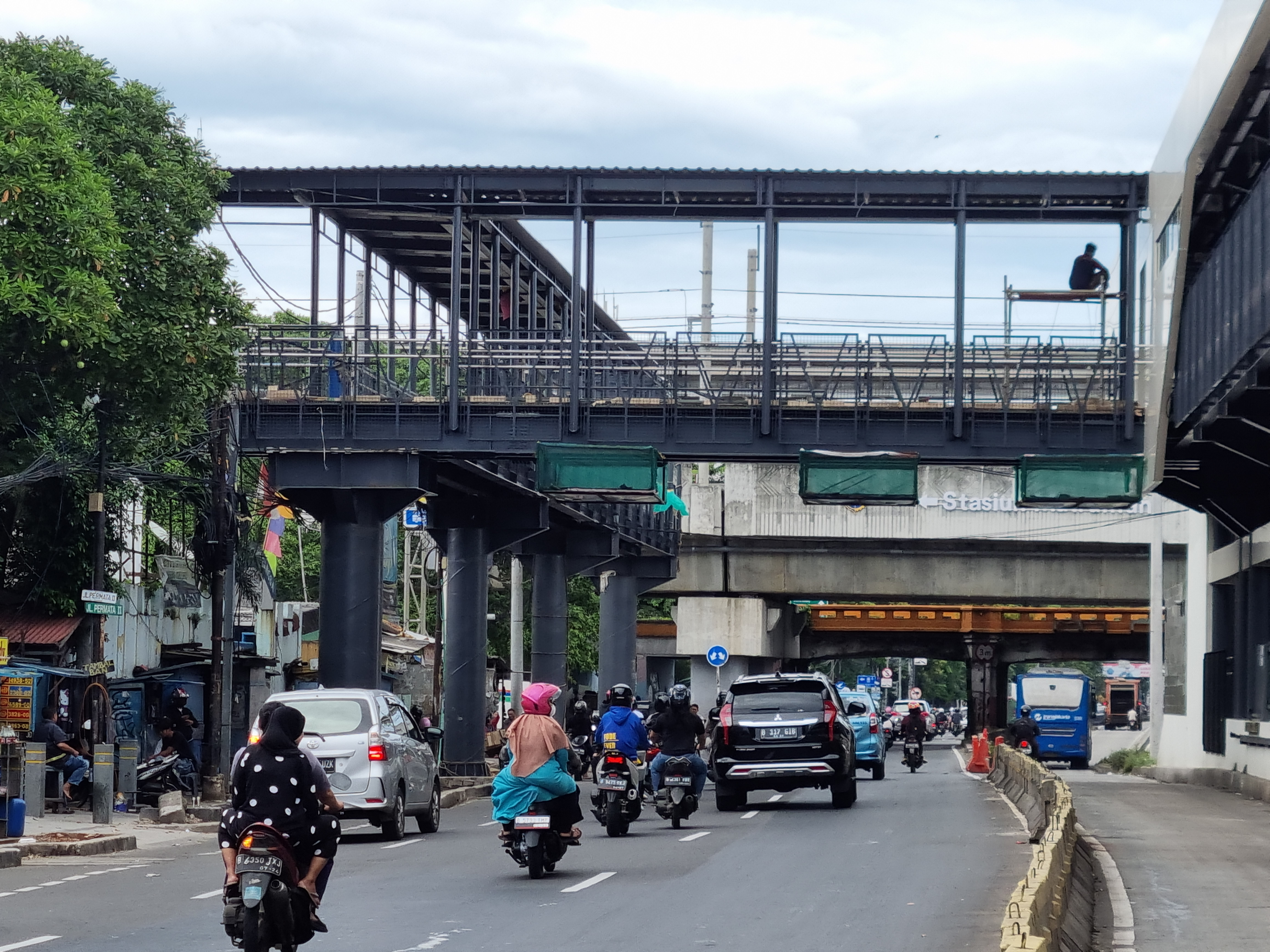
Footbridge access to the Matraman railway station
