= Kampung Melayu (Transjakarta) =

Bus rapid transit station in Jakarta, Indonesia

5 18 7 14 11 16 Kampung Melayu
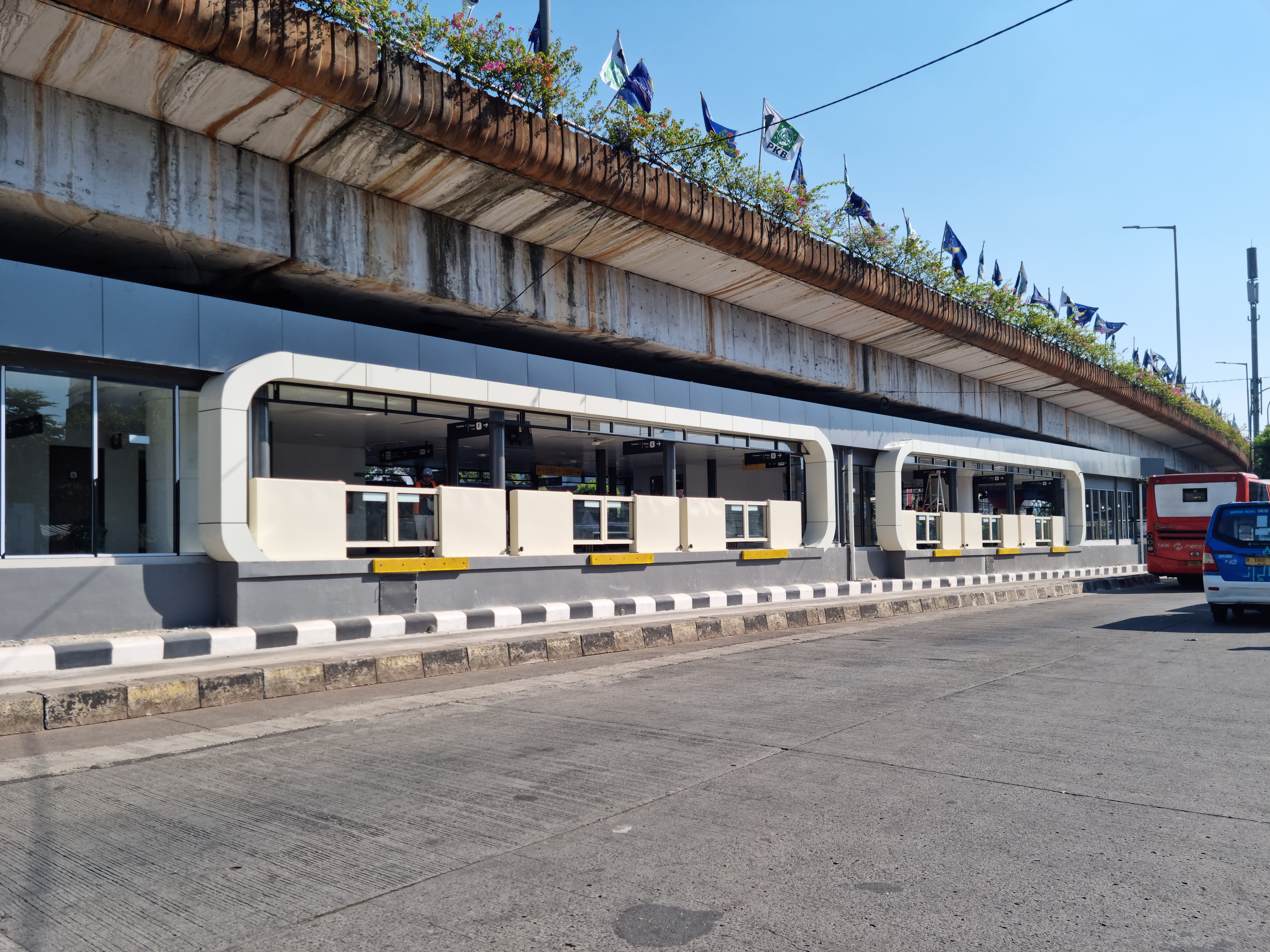
- The north facade of the station

General information
- Location: Oto Iskandar di Nata Street, Bali Mester, Jatinegara, East Jakarta 13310, Indonesia
- Coordinates: 6°13′28″S 106°52′00″E
- System: Transjakarta bus rapid transit station
- Owner: Transjakarta
- Operator: Transjakarta
- Lines: List of Transjakarta corridors#Corridor 5 List of Transjakarta corridors#Cross-corridor routes List of TransJakarta corridors#Corridor 7 List of TransJakarta corridors#Corridor 11
- Platforms: 1 island platform (north and south); 2 side platforms (west and east)

Construction
- Structure type: At-grade
- Cycle facilities: No

Other information
- Status: In service

History
- Opened: 27 January 2007
- Rebuilt: 19 July 2023; 3 years ago

Services
Preceding		Following
Matraman Baru towards Ancol	Corridor 5 Terminus	Jatinegara One-way operation
Matraman Baru towards Juanda	Corridor 5 Route 5C	Bidara Cina One-way operation
Jatinegara One-way operation	Corridor 5 Route 5C	Bidara Cina towards Cililitan
Bidara Cina towards Kampung Rambutan	Corridor 7 Terminus	Terminus
Stasiun Jatinegara towards Pulo Gebang	Corridor 11 Terminus	Jatinegara One-way operation
Location

Kampung Melayu is a Transjakarta bus rapid transit station located below the K.H. Abdullah Syafei overpass, at the middle of the interchange between Abdullah Syafei, Oto Iskandar di Nata, and Jatinegara Barat/Timur streets in Kampung Melayu, Jatinegara, East Jakarta, Indonesia. This is the terminus and transit point between corridors 5, 7, and 11.

It stands on the former site of an open-air bus terminal for Kopaja, Metromini, and angkot/mikrolet routes. Since all those modes (except some angkot/mikrolet) ceased operating and converted into Transjakarta routes, the terminal currently serves Transjakarta's BRT and feeder services, as well as remaining mikrolet routes.

== History ==
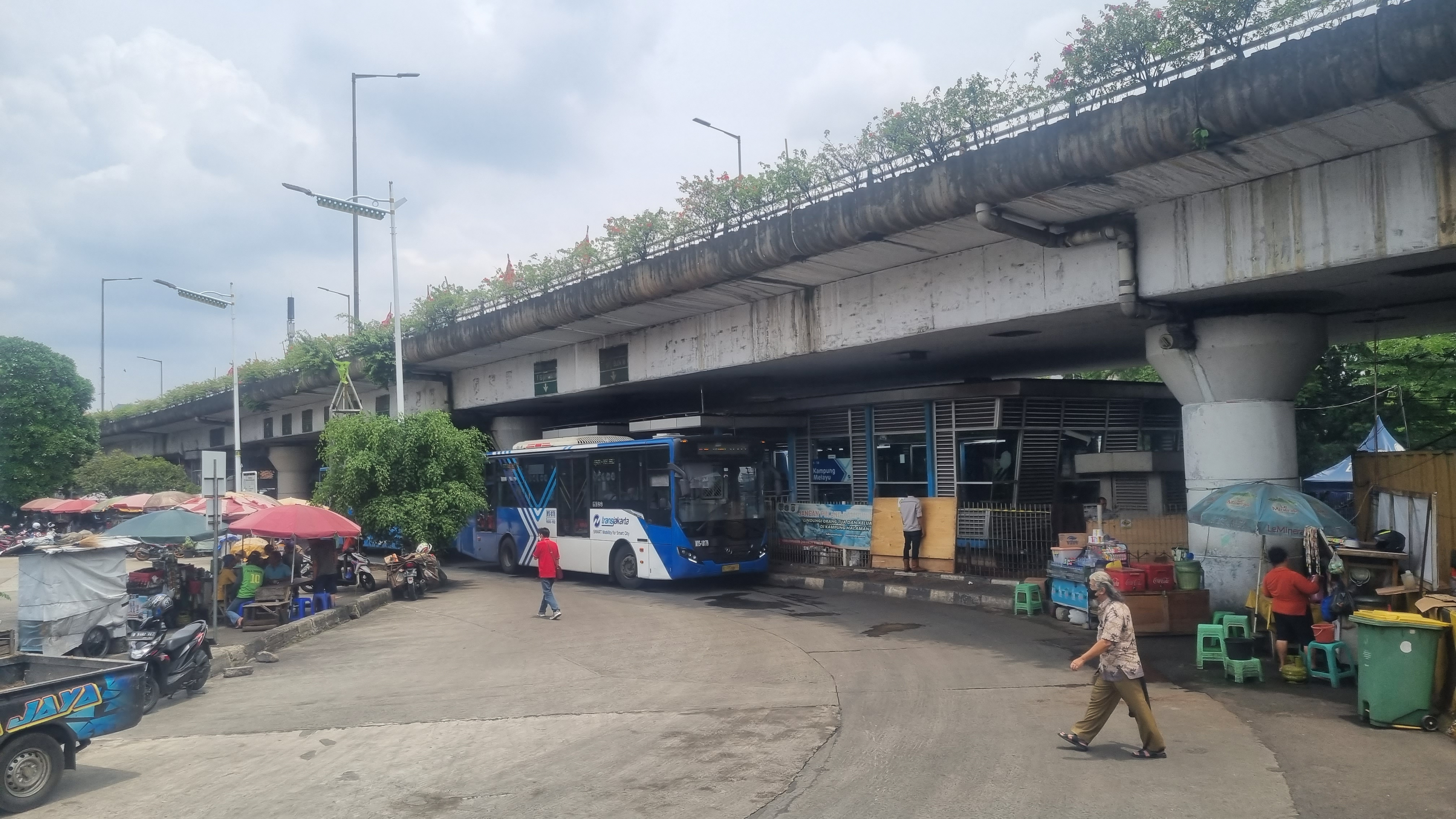
The station prior to revitalization, 2022

The Kampung Melayu BRT station was built below the Abdullah Syafei overpass, which used to be the platform bay area of the original terminal (as seen on the remainings of signages placed on the south side of the overpass girder). It began operational on 27 January 2007, simultaneously with the opening of corridors 5 and 7. The original building was built with aluminium and steel structure, but it had an uneven steel slab floors.

On 23 December 2022, Transjakarta announced that the Kampung Melayu BRT station would be closed for revitalization on 7 January 2023, to enlarge the station's capacity. As the impact, the three main corridors have to be temporarily readjusted: corridor 5 shortened to Matraman Baru, corridor 7 shortened to Bidara Cina, and corridor 11 extended to Matraman 1 (later shortened to Matraman Baru). Apart from that, Transjakarta provides the 7ST (Kampung Melayu–Matraman 1, later Bidara Cina–Matraman Baru) temporary shuttle route for affected passengers. On the first day of revitalization, there were numbers of passengers that didn't know about the revitalization.

On 19 July 2023, Kampung Melayu BRT station was reopened to the public and all the three affected main corridors returned to terminate at this station. The result of the revitalization was praised by passengers.

== Building and layout ==
Kampung Melayu BRT station now consist of north, south, west, and east platforms, with a total of 21 platform bays/gates. The east platform was newly built during the revitalization. North platform is used for corridors 5 and 11, south platform for corridor 7, and west and east platforms for corridor 5C. For the architectural design, the new building is dominated with glass walls to provide more natural lighting from the sunlight. It has a futuristic design, where the platform bays resemble squicles and the building is painted in beige and grey. New amenities such as toilets and a prayer room (musala) are also available.

West
↑ (Matraman Baru)

to Juanda

North
to Cililitan

(Bidara Cina) ↓

East
Non-BRT bus terminus
← (Matraman Baru/Stasiun Jatinegara) to Ancol and to Pulo Gebang
Side platform, the doors are opened on the right side of the direction of travel
Island platform, north and south platform doors are opened on the left side of the direction of travel
Side platform, the doors are opened on the right side of the direction of travel
to Kampung Rambutan (Bidara Cina) →
Mikrotrans terminus and pool
South

== Non-BRT bus services ==
The north side of the BRT station is used as the terminus of Transjakarta's non-BRT bus routes, while the south side is used as the terminus and pool of Mikrotrans routes. Some non-BRT bus routes are the successors of Kopaja and MetroMini, as well as Mikrotrans (using microbus fleets) that replaced some angkot/mikrolet routes.

Type	Route	Destination	Notes
Inner city feeder		Tebet Station–Bidara Cina (regular)	Inside the station
Inner city feeder		Kampung Melayu–Tanah Abang (Metrotrans)	Outside the station
Inner city feeder		Kampung Melayu–Tanah Abang (via Cikini) (Metrotrans)	Outside the station
Inner city feeder		Kampung Melayu–Ragunan (Minitrans)	Outside the station for passenger alighting, but inside the station for passenger boarding
Inner city feeder		Cibubur–Ancol (regular)	Inside the station
Inner city feeder		Pulo Gebang–Kampung Melayu (via East Flood Canal (BKT)) (Minitrans)	Inside the station
Cross-border feeder (Transjabodetabek)	(towards Dukuh Atas only)	Bekasi → Dukuh Atas via Becakayu Toll Road	Inside the station
Jakarta Fair feeder	List of Transjakarta corridors#Jakarta Fair feeder	Kampung Melayu–JIEXPO Kemayoran	Only operates during the Jakarta Fair and/or other events in JIExpo Kemayoran Inside the station
Mikrotrans Jak Lingko	JAK-41	Kampung Melayu–Pulo Gadung	Outside the station
Mikrotrans Jak Lingko	JAK-42	Kampung Melayu–Pondok Kelapa	Outside the station
Mikrotrans Jak Lingko	JAK-84	Kampung Melayu–Pangkalan Jati	Outside the station
Mikrotrans Jak Lingko	JAK-106	Kampung Melayu–Klender	Outside the station

== Places nearby ==
- Avalokitesvara Vihāra
- Azzahra University
- Jatinegara Rental Vertical Housing (Rusunawa)
- Jatinegara market
- Jatinegara Premiere Hospital

== Incidents ==
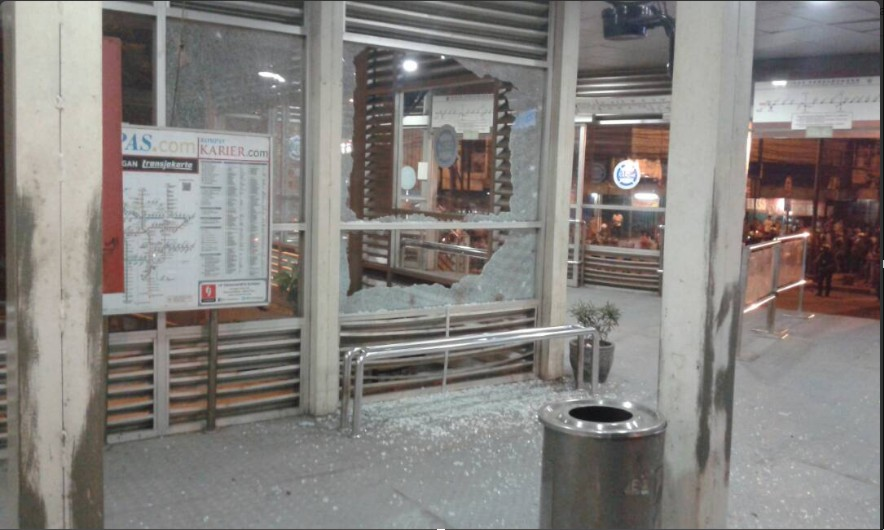
The station after the bombing

On 24 May 2017, the Kampung Melayu BRT station was damaged by two bomb explosions, breaking the glass walls. Two bombing preparator and three police officers were killed, with 11 people injured. Because of the bombing, corridors 5 and 11 temporarily terminates at Jatinegara RS Premier (now Jatinegara) and corridor 7 terminates at Bidara Cina. On 29 May, five days after the bombing, Kampung Melayu station resumed its operational normally.

== Gallery ==
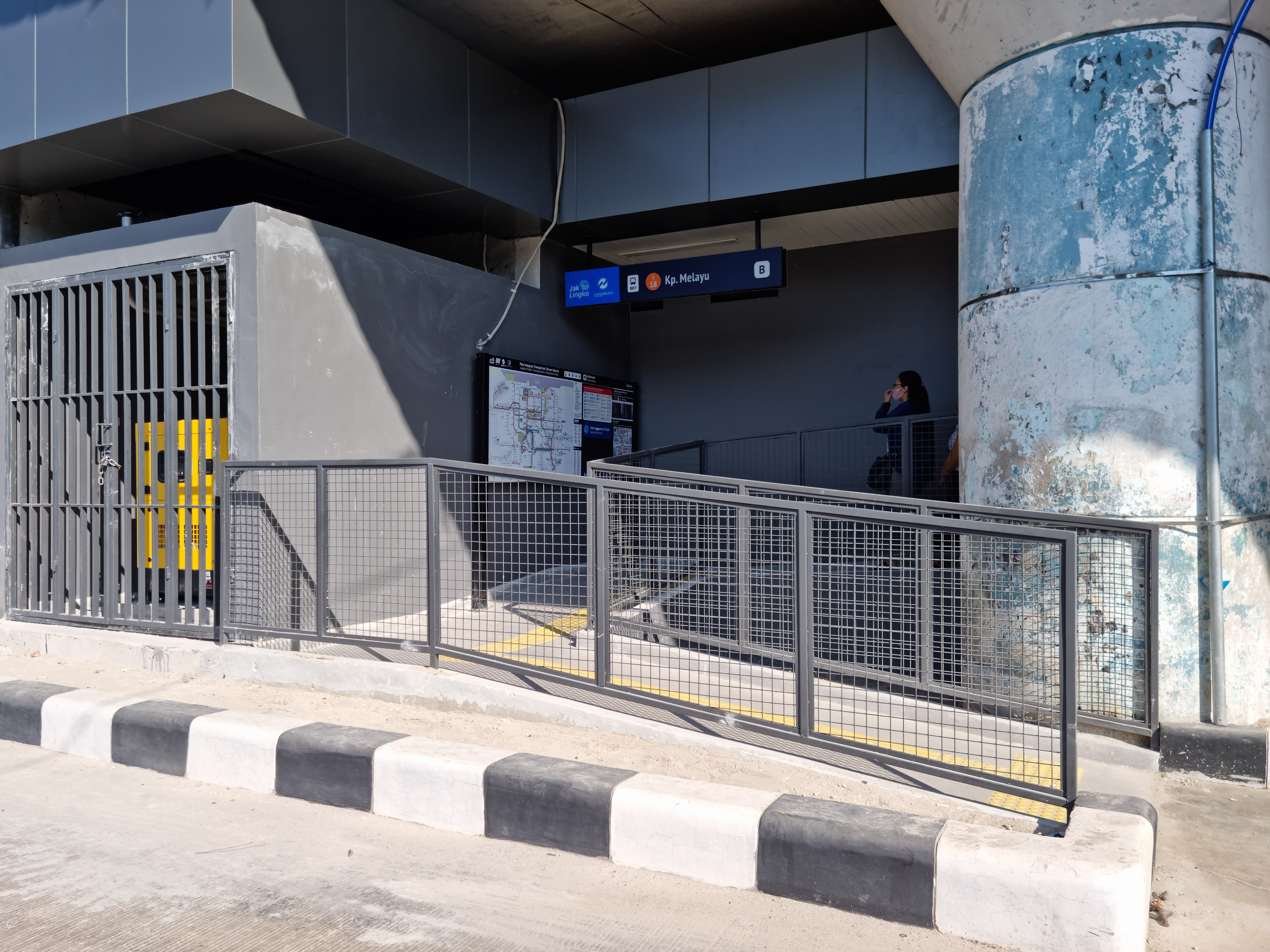
Entrance gate B

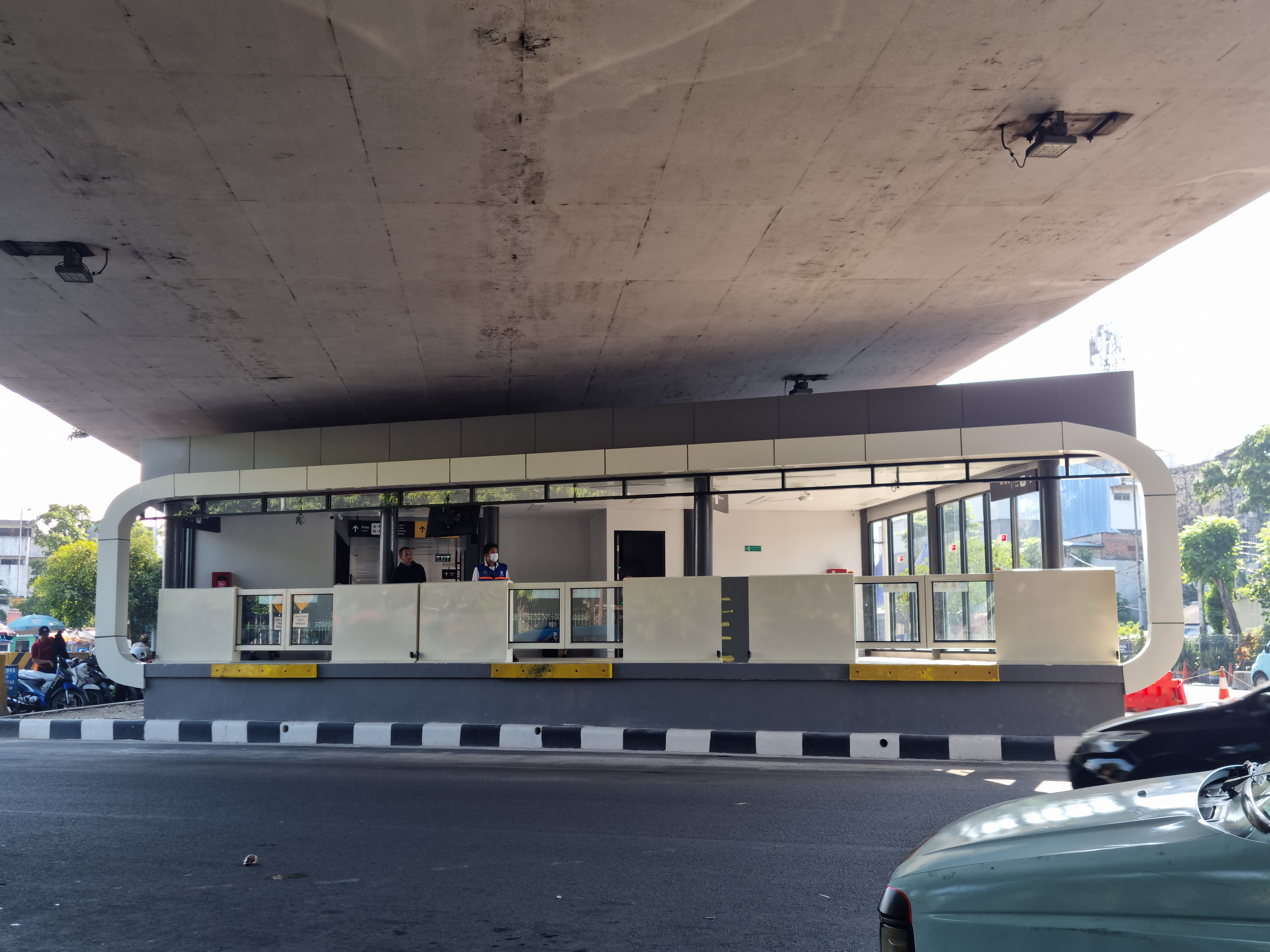
The east facade of the station, serving corridor 5C

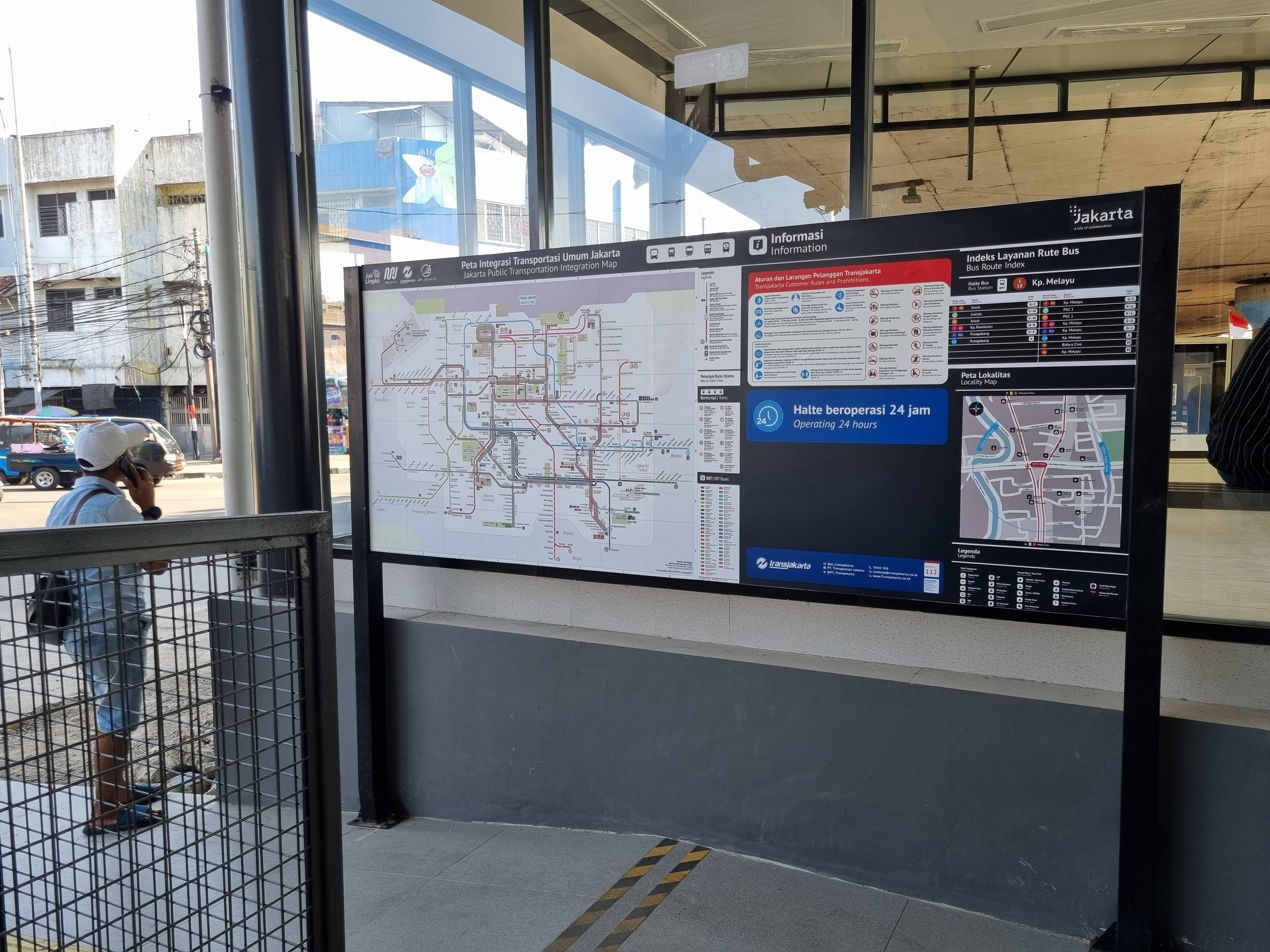
A map and information board on entrance gate A

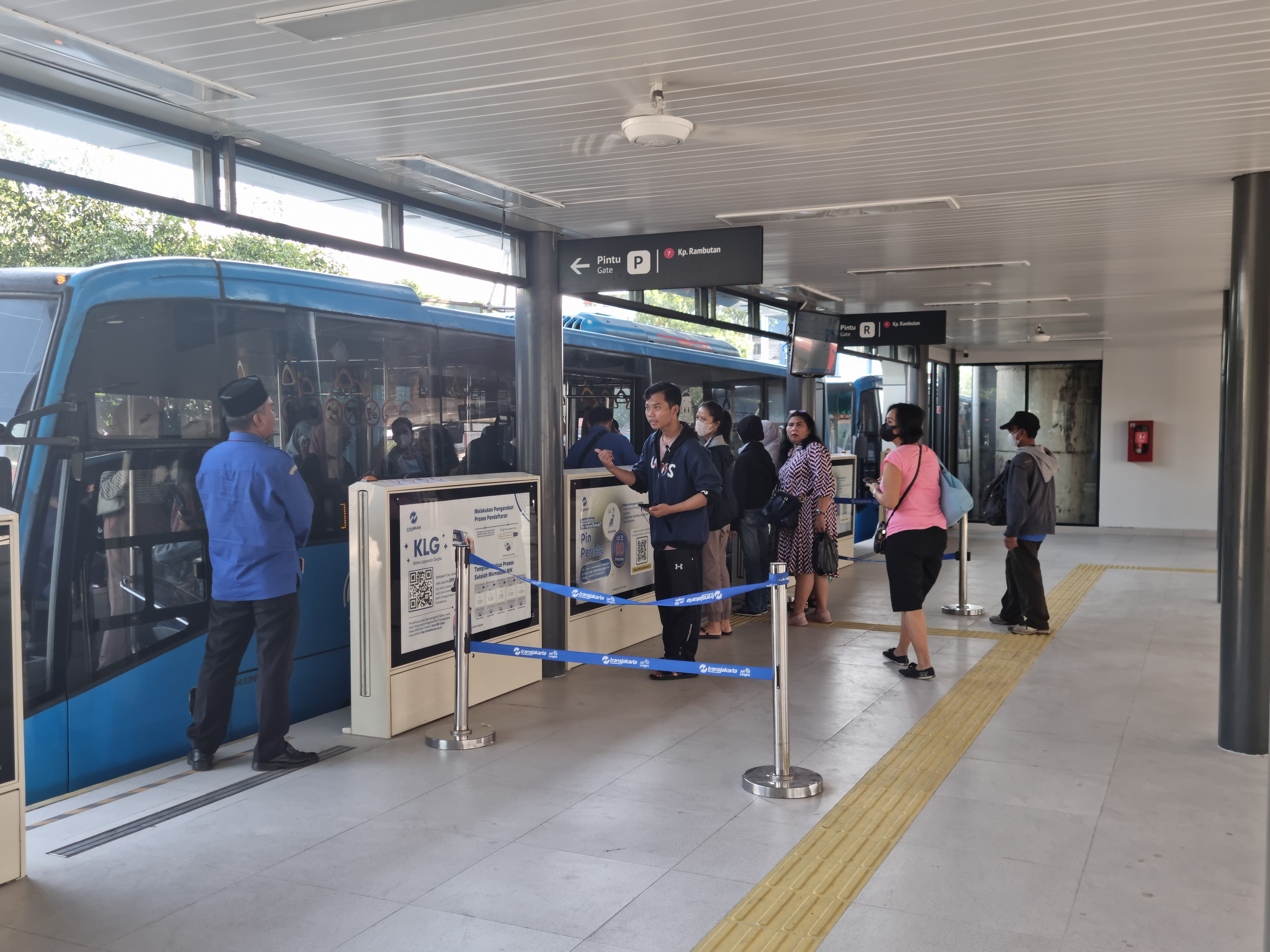
Passengers boarding the corridor 7 bus towards Kampung Rambutan

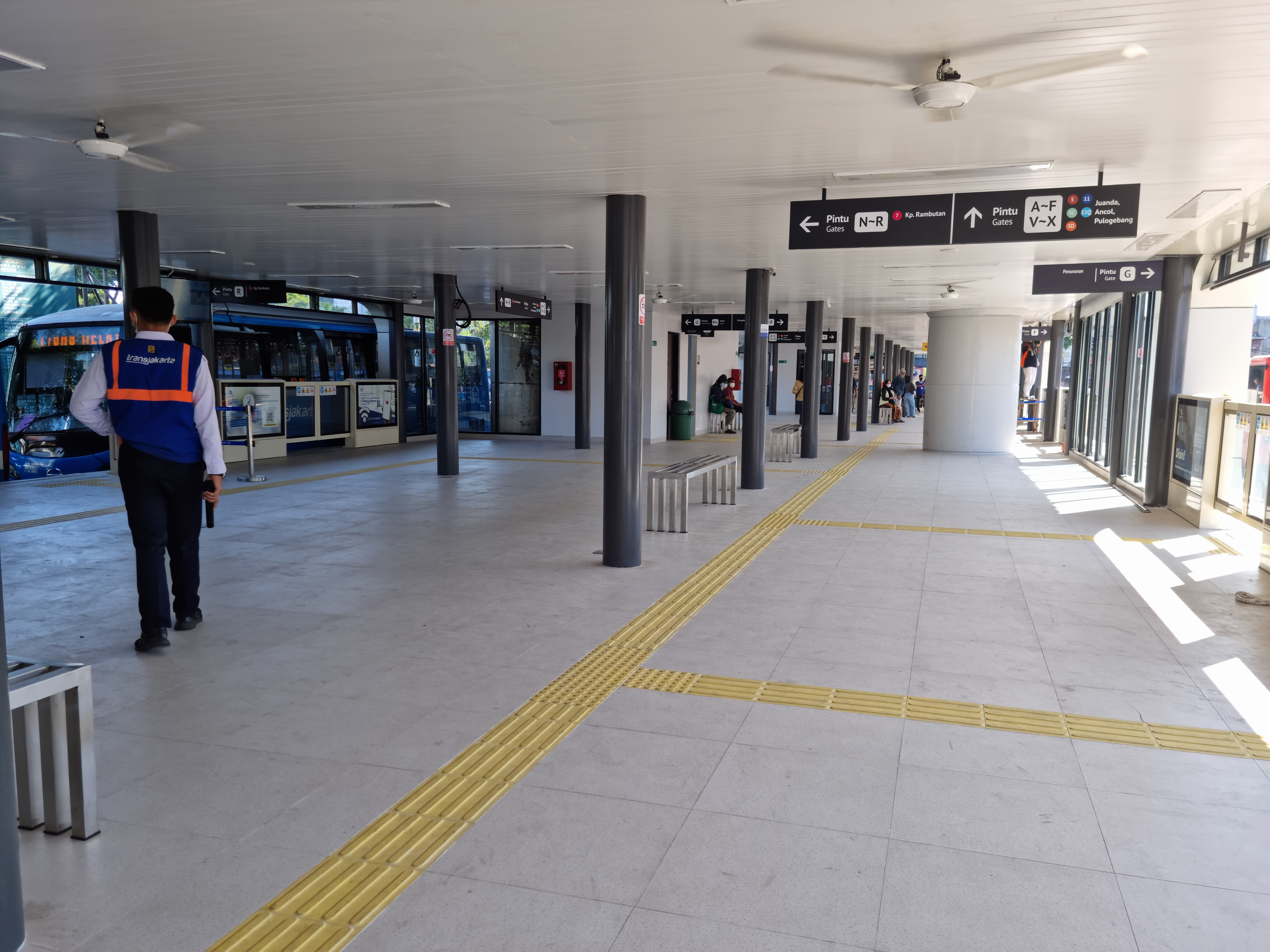
The station platform area

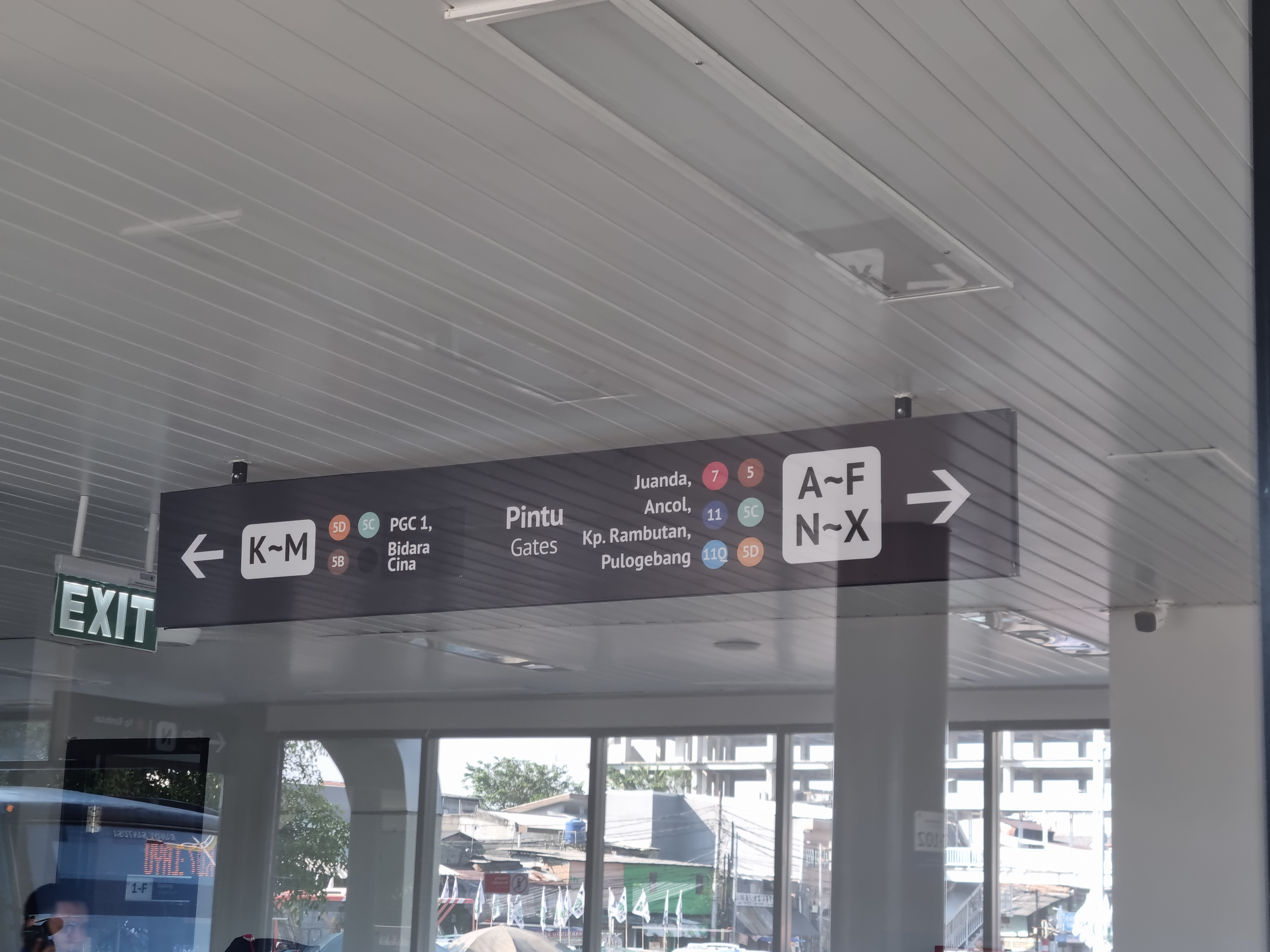
The platform gates/bays signage
