= Transjakarta Corridor 11 =

Bus rapid transit route in Indonesia

- Pulo Gebang – Kampung Melayu
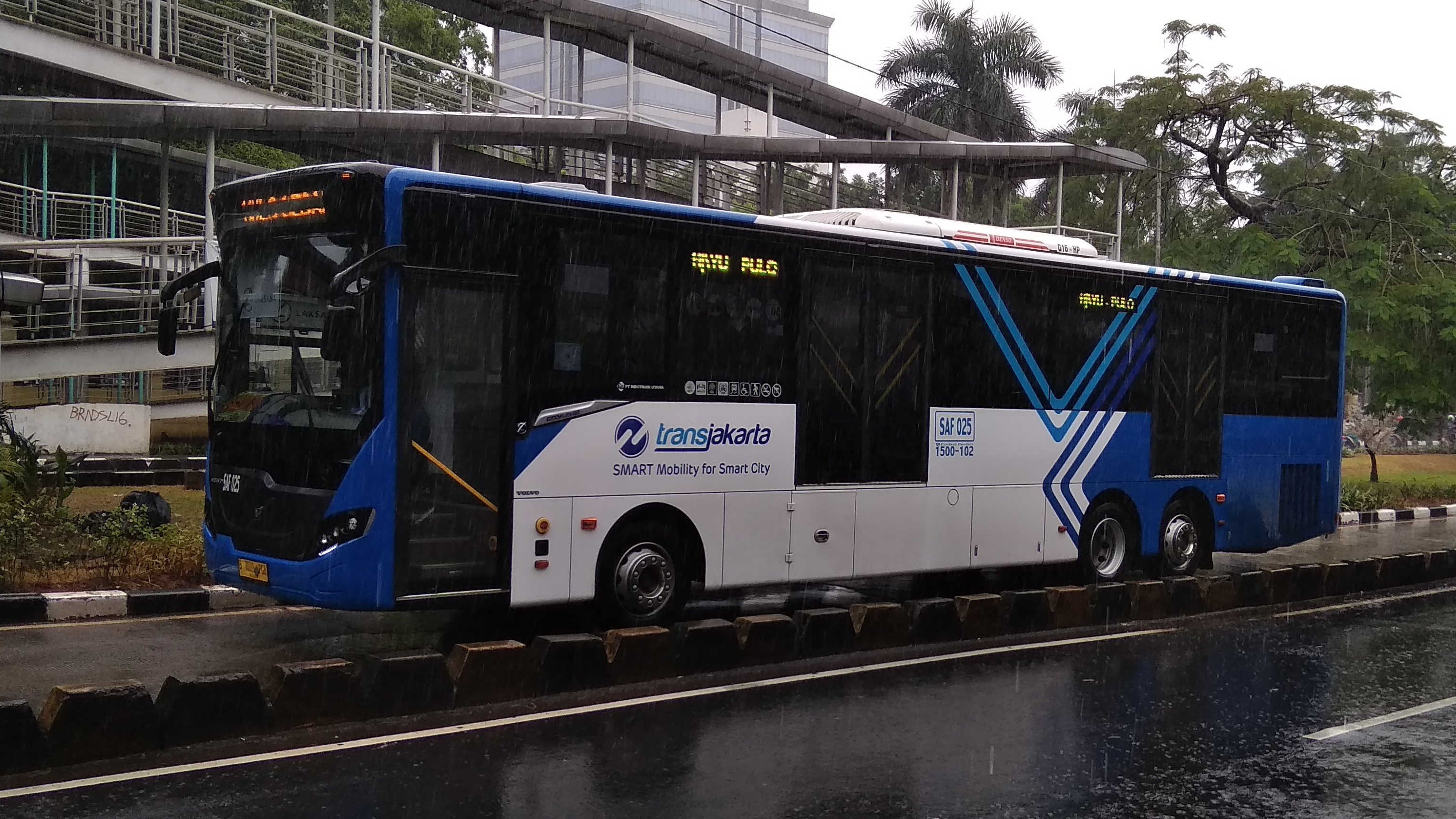
- The Volvo bus that serves Corridor 11 entering Walikota Jakarta Timur BRT station

Overview
- System: Transjakarta
- Operator: PT. Transportasi Jakarta (TJ, infrastructure and staffs); Steady Safe (SAF, fleets and drivers); Perum DAMRI (DMR, fleets and drivers)
- Began service: December 28, 2011

Route
- Route type: Street-level bus rapid transit
- Locale: East Jakarta
- Length: 15 km
- Stations: 16

Transjakarta Corridor 11 is a bus rapid transit corridor in East Jakarta, Jakarta, Indonesia, operated by Transjakarta. It connects the Pulo Gebang Bus Terminal in Cakung, with the Kampung Melayu Bus Terminal in Jatinegara. The streets that passed by Corridor 11 are Sentra Primer Timur, Dr. Sumarno, Penggilingan, I Gusti Ngurah Rai, Bekasi Barat/Timur, and Jatinegara Barat/Timur streets. Starting from the Stasiun Jatinegara BRT station to the Penggilingan overpass, this corridor is adjacent and integrated with KRL Commuterline on the Cikarang Loop Line route via Jatinegara, Klender, Buaran, and Cakung stations.

== History ==
Corridor 11 began its service on December 28, 2011, where it was inaugurated by the Governor of Jakarta at the time, Fauzi Bowo. At the time, Walikota Jakarta Timur BRT station was the terminus of the corridor, due to the Pulo Gebang Bus Terminal was not finished yet. When the terminal construction completed in 2012, only a few numbers of buses that terminates at the terminal. On December 28, 2016, Pulo Gebang Terminal was inaugurated and Corridor 11 was extended to the terminal.

On April 15, 2022, to create a seamless integration between Corridor 11 with other public transportation services (such as the KRL Commuterline), the Stasiun Jatinegara BRT Station as one of the stations on this corridor was closed for renovation to be directly connected with the Jatinegara railway station, along with 10 other BRT stations on Corridor 1, 2, 5, and 9. The renovated Stasiun Jatinegara BRT station was inaugurated on January 4, 2023.

Later on January 7, 2023, the Kampung Melayu BRT station as the terminus of Corridor 5, 7, and 11 was also closed for revitalization in order to enlarge the station's capacity. During the revitalization, Corridor 11 was temporarily extended to Matraman Baru on Corridor 5. The Kampung Melayu BRT station was reopened on July 19, 2023, and Corridor 11 returned to terminate there.

== List of BRT stations ==
- Currently, all stations are served by buses 24 hours a day.
- Station indicated by a → sign has a one way service towards Kampung Melayu only.

Corridor 11 (Pulo Gebang – Kampung Melayu)
| Code | Station name | Transfer/Notes | Bus terminal or train station nearby |
|---|---|---|---|
Stations in order: From top to bottom (downwards) towards Kampung Melayu (→); from bottom to top (upwards) towards Pulo Gebang (←)
| 11 01 | Pulo Gebang | Two separate buildings for opposing directions require exiting paid area to transfer: Part 1: Arrivals only; Part 2: Towards Kampung Melayu (→) | Pulo Gebang Bus Terminal |
| 11 02 | Walikota Jakarta Timur | | |
| 11 03 | Penggilingan | | |
| 11 04 | Flyover Pondok Kopi | | |
| 11 05 | Simpang Buaran | | Buaran |
| 11 06 | Buaran | | |
| 11 07 | Kampung Sumur | | |
| 11 08 | Klender | | Klender (Planned) |
| 11 09 | Stasiun Klender | | Klender |
| 11 10 | Cipinang | | |
| 11 11 | Flyover Cipinang | | |
| 11 12 | Pasar Enjo | | |
| 11 13 10 15 | Flyover Jatinegara | Flyover Jatinegara (via skybridge) | Jatinegara |
| 11 14 | Stasiun Jatinegara | Bali Mester (via skybridge) | Jatinegara |
| 11 15 5 17 | Jatinegara → | Jatinegara | |
Towards Pulo Gebang (←) heads straight to Stasiun Jatinegara
| 11 16 5 18 7 14 | Kampung Melayu | Kampung Melayu | Kampung Melayu Bus Terminal |

== Fleets ==
Information correct as of January 2025

- Steady Safe (SAF):
  - Volvo B11R 6x2 A/T, white-blue (SAF)
- Perum DAMRI (DMR):
  - Zhongtong LCK6126EVGRA1 e-bus, white-blue (night bus (22:00-05:00))

== Depots ==
- Steady Safe (SAF):
  - Klender
- Perum DAMRI (DMR):
  - Cakung (night bus)

== Incidents ==
- On October 9, 2013, the Buaran BRT station was burned by demonstrators who were fighting against a land execution in Buaran, East Jakarta. As the impact, Corridor 11 service was temporarily closed until the burned and damaged BRT station restored to its normal condition. Passengers were diverted to other transportation services.
- The Kampung Melayu BRT station as the terminus of Corridor 11 was destructed by two explosions on May 24, 2017. 5 people were killed and 11 people were injured.

== See also ==
- Transjakarta
  - List of Transjakarta corridors
