= Bekasi–Cawang–Kampung Melayu Toll Road =

Toll road in Indonesia

- Becakayu
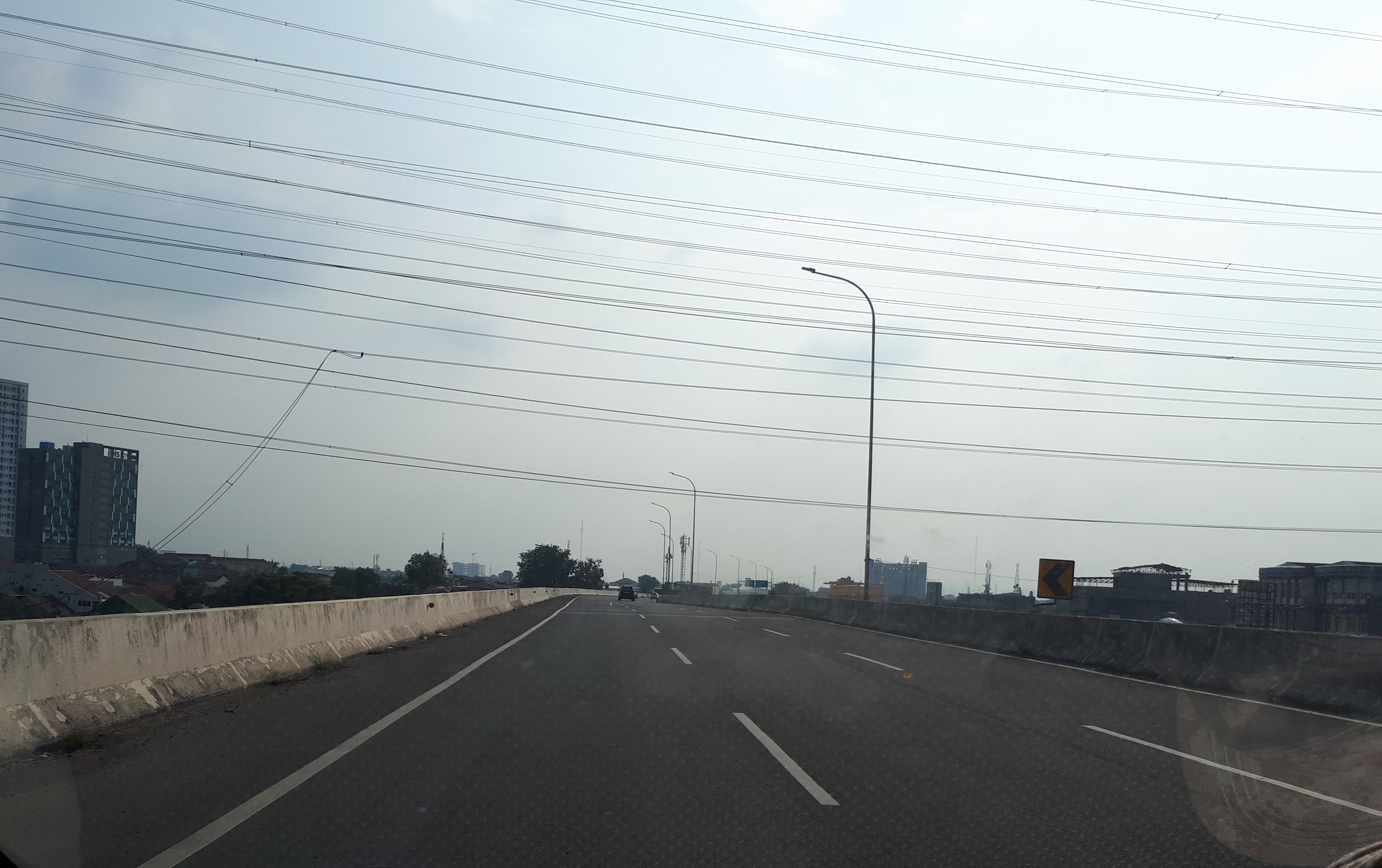

Route information
- Maintained by PT Kresna Kusuma Dyandra Marga (KKDM) (PT Waskita Toll Road) (Waskita Karya)
- Length: 21.04 km (13.07 mi)
- Existed: 1996–present

Major junctions
- From: Kampung Melayu
- Jakarta Outer Ring Road; Ir. Wiyoto Wiyono Toll Road
- To: Bekasi

Location
- Country: Indonesia
- Major cities: East Jakarta, Bekasi

Highway system
- Transport in Indonesia

Bekasi–Cawang–Kampung Melayu Toll Road or Becakayu is a controlled-access toll road constructed over the Kalimalang River in East Jakarta and Bekasi, Indonesia to decrease traffic congestion around Kalimalang.

The toll road began construction in 1996 by PT Kresna Kusuma Dyandra Marga, founded by Tommy Suharto, but was halted two years later due to the Asian financial crisis. The construction of the 21.04 kilometer toll road had been idle for about 20 years before a consortium of construction companies took over and restarted the project in late 2014. The Becakayu toll road costs Rp7.2 trillion, construction costs Rp4.785 trillion, land acquisition costs Rp449 billion and concession period of 45 years (since SPMK). Investor and manager of Becakayu Toll Road is PT Waskita Toll Road, a subsidiary of PT Waskita Karya (Persero) Tbk, which holds 98.97 percent of PT Kresna Kusuma Dyandra Marga shares.

On 3 November 2017, President Joko Widodo inaugurated the Section of IB and Becakayu Toll Road along Cipinang Melayu - Jakasampurna. After the inauguration, the toll is opened for free, and after two weeks, the entry fee is Rp14.000,00 for Group 1 The toll road was expected to be fully operational by 2024 but is still under construction . The toll road plan will be extended along 2 km and will extended to Tambun.

== Sections ==
- Section IA: Casablanca-Cipinang Melayu - 3,19 km
- Section IB and IC: Cipinang Melayu-Pangkalan Jati-Jakasampurna - 8,26 km
- Section IIA: Jakasampurna-Duren Jaya - 10,04 km
- Section IIB: Duren Jaya-Tambun, approximately 6.9 km long - plan (Not confirmed)
- Section III: Tambun-Telaga Asih, approximately 5.5 km long - plan

== See also ==
- Trans-Java toll road
