= NGC 13 =

Galaxy in the constellation Andromeda

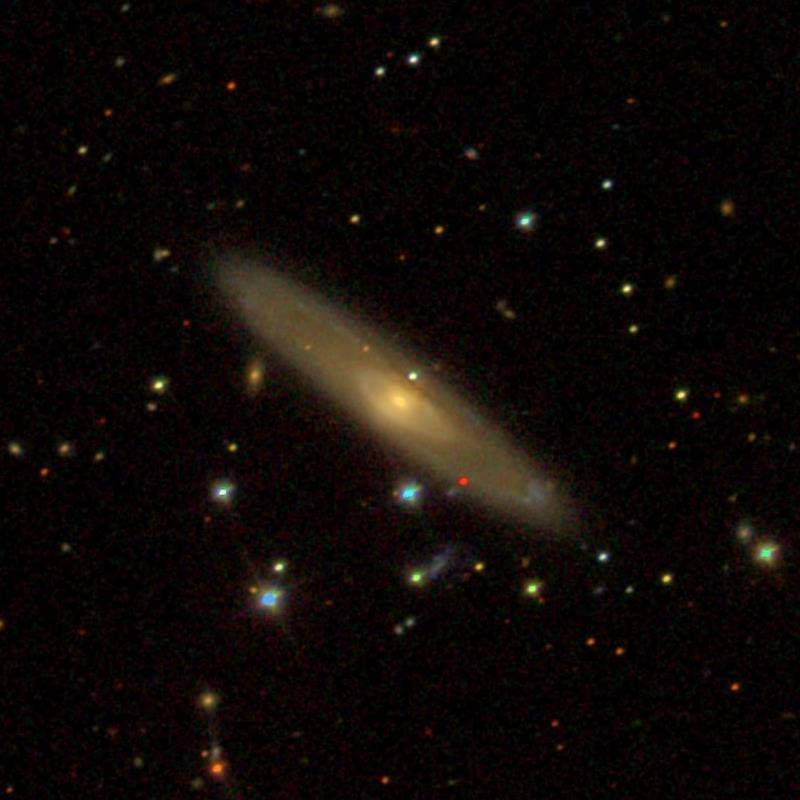
- SDSS image of NGC 13

Observation data (J2000 epoch)
- Constellation: Andromeda
- Right ascension: 00^{h} 08^{m} 47.72^{s}
- Declination: +33° 26′ 00.0″
- Redshift: 0.01604
- Heliocentric radial velocity: 4808 ± 9 km/s
- Distance: 215.8 ± 15.1 Mly (66.15 ± 4.64 Mpc)
- Apparent magnitude (B): 14.20
- Absolute magnitude (V): −19.76

Characteristics
- Type: (R)Sab:
- Apparent size (V): 2.2′ × 0.4′

Other designations
- UGC 77, MCG +05-01-034, PGC 650, CGCG 498-081

NGC 13 is a spiral galaxy in the constellation Andromeda. It is estimated to be about 220 million light-years (66 Megaparsecs) away from the Sun. It was discovered on November 26, 1790, by William Herschel.

== NGC 7831 Group ==
According to A.M. Garcia, NGC 13 is a member of the NGC 7831 group (also known as LGG 1), which contains at least 18 galaxies, including NGC 19, NGC 20, NGC 21, NGC 39, NGC 43, NGC 7805, NGC 7806, NGC 7819, and NGC 7836.

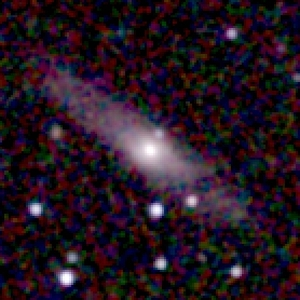
NGC 13 (near-infrared)

== See also ==
- NGC 12
- NGC 14
- NGC
- UGC
- PGC
- List of NGC objects
- List of NGC objects (1–1000)
