= NGC 12 =

Galaxy in the constellation Pisces

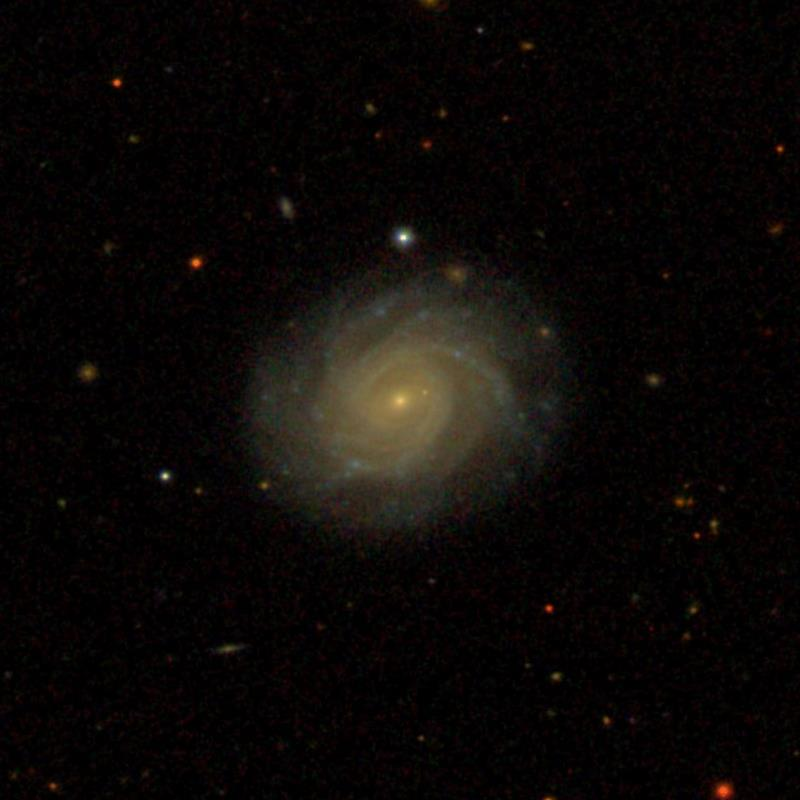
- NGC 12 Sloan Digital Sky Survey

Observation data (J2000 epoch)
- Constellation: Pisces
- Right ascension: 00^{h} 08^{m} 44.752^{s}
- Declination: +04° 36′ 45.12″
- Redshift: 0.013049
- Heliocentric radial velocity: 3886 ± 42 km/s
- Distance: 183 Mly
- Apparent magnitude (V): 13.18
- Apparent magnitude (B): 13.84

Characteristics
- Type: SAB(rs)c:
- Apparent size (V): 1.7′ × 1.35′

Other designations
- UGC 74, MCG +01-01-040, PGC 645

NGC 12 is an intermediate spiral galaxy in the constellation Pisces. It was discovered by William Herschel on December 6, 1790. The galaxy's magnitude is around 14.5, but have a very low surface brightness.

== See also ==
- UGC
- NGC
- NGC 11
- NGC 13
- List of NGC objects
- List of NGC objects (1–1000)
