= NGC 10 =

Spiral galaxy in the constellation Sculptor

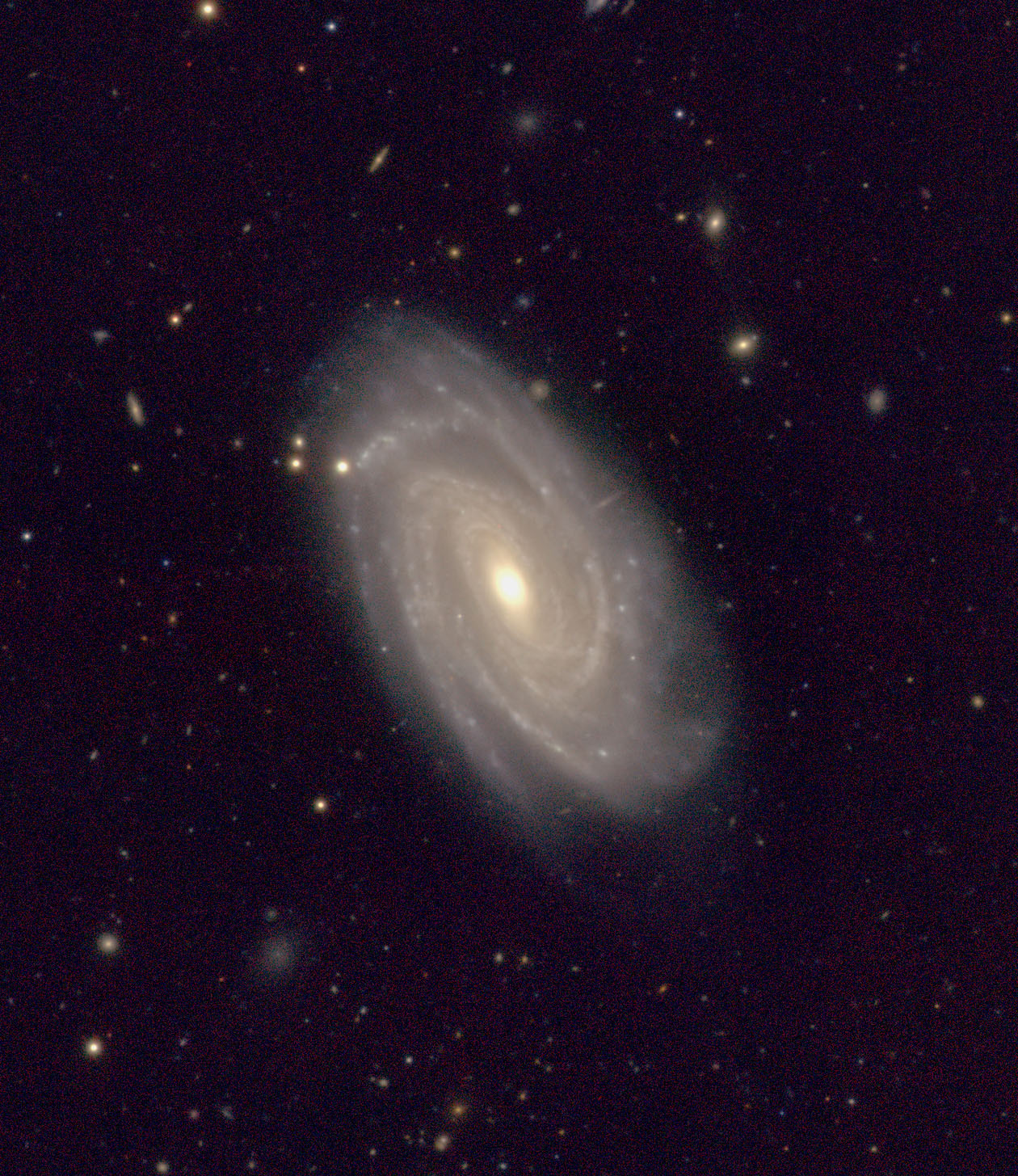
- NGC 10 ESO KIDS

Observation data (J2000 epoch)
- Constellation: Sculptor
- Right ascension: 00^{h} 08^{m} 34.53660^{s}
- Declination: −33° 51′ 30.1884″
- Redshift: 0.022719±0.000033
- Heliocentric radial velocity: 6,811±10 km/s
- Distance: 346.3 Mly (106.17 Mpc)
- Apparent magnitude (V): 13.3
- Absolute magnitude (V): −21.55

Characteristics
- Type: SAB(rs)bc or SBbc
- Size: ~260,000 ly (79.49 kpc) (estimated)
- Apparent size (V): 1.373′ × 0.879′

Other designations
- PGC 634, ESO 349-32, MCG-06-01-024

NGC 10 is a spiral galaxy located in the southern constellation of Sculptor. It was discovered by John Herschel on 25 September 1834.

== Properties ==
The galaxy is estimated to be around 111 thousand light years across with a high degree of uncertainty. The galaxy is located at a distance of 346 Mly from the Sun. Its morphological classification in the De Vaucouleurs system is SAB(rs)bc, where the 'SAB' denotes a weak-barred spiral, '(rs)' indicates a slight ring-like structure, and 'bc' means the spiral arms are moderately to loosely wound. Paturel et al. (2003) assigned this galaxy a classification of SBbc, indicating a barred spiral galaxy.

== Supernova ==
On 22 December 2011, a Type II supernova designated SN 2011jo was discovered in NGC 10 by Stuart Parker of New Zealand. It was located 2″ east and 16″ north of the galactic nucleus.

== See also ==
- NGC
- UGC
- NGC 9
- NGC 11
- List of NGC objects
- List of NGC objects (1–1000)
