= UCG =

UCG may refer to:

== Universities ==
- Universidade Católica de Goiás, a Catholic university in Brazil
- University College, Galway, a National University of Ireland
- University of Montenegro (Montenegrin: Univerzitet Crne Gore, Универзитет Црнe Горe)

== Other uses ==
- Serine, a proteinogenic amino acid, specified by redundant codons in the genetic code that include UCG
- UCG or United Communications Group, a privately held company, owner of GasBuddy
- Underground coal gasification, a process carried on in non-mined coal seams
- United Church of God, a Christian denomination
- Urban contemporary gospel, a modern subgenre of gospel music.

== See also ==
- UGC (disambiguation)
