= NGC 7806 =

Galaxy in the constellation Pegasus

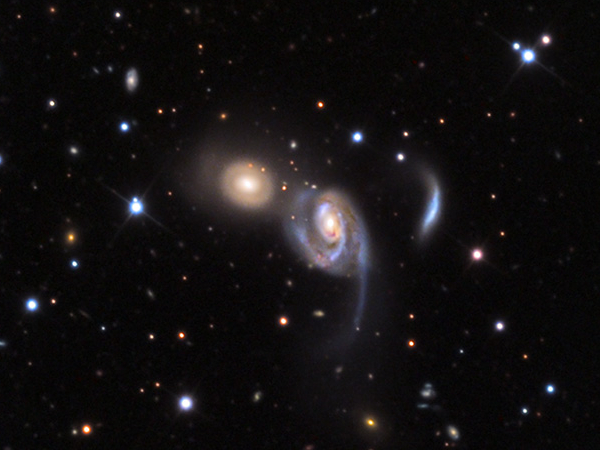
- NGC 7806 (center) by the 32-inch Schulman Telescope at Mount Lemmon Observatory

Observation data (J2000 epoch)
- Constellation: Pegasus
- Right ascension: 00^{h} 01^{m} 30.0539^{s}
- Declination: +31° 26′ 30.923″
- Redshift: 0.015954 ± 0.000017
- Heliocentric radial velocity: 4,783 ± 5 km/s
- Distance: 225 ± 5 Mly (68.9 ± 1.7 Mpc)
- Apparent magnitude (V): 13.5

Characteristics
- Type: SA(rs)bc? pec
- Apparent size (V): 1.1′ × 0.8′
- Notable features: Interacting galaxy

Other designations
- UGC 12911, Arp 112, VV 226a, CGCG 498-065, CGCG 499-037, MCG +05-01-025, KPG 602B, HOLM 826B, PGC 112

NGC 7806 is an unbarred spiral galaxy located in the constellation Pegasus. It is located at a distance of about 225 million light years from Earth, which, given its apparent dimensions, means that NGC 7806 is about 80,000 light years across. It was discovered by William Herschel on October 9, 1790. It forms a pair with NGC 7805 and is included in the Atlas of Peculiar Galaxies in the elliptical and elliptical-like galaxies repelling spiral arms section.

NGC 7806 formes a triplet with the elliptical galaxy NGC 7805 to the southwest and faint arc-shaped galaxy KUG 2359-311 towards the west. A faint tail seems to connect NGC 7806 with KUG 2359–311 to the south and maybe to the north. NGC 7806 also has a tidal tail which extends towards the north and contains two ultraviolet clumps. The hydrogen in the galaxy is off-center and towards the north of the galaxy. This asymmetry is the result of strong interaction. The total HI mass is estimated to be 1.4×10^{9} M_{☉}. At the northern half of the disk features star forming regions which emit H-alpha, matching both the ultraviolet and hydrogen line emissions, and star formation was likely triggered by the interaction with NGC 7805. The total star formation rate of the galaxy is estimated to be 0.06 M_{☉} per year.

According to A.M. Garcia, NGC 7806 is a member of the NGC 7831 group (also known as LGG 1), which contains at least 18 galaxies, including NGC 13, NGC 19, NGC 20, NGC 21, NGC 39, NGC 43, NGC 7819, and NGC 7836.

== Gallery ==
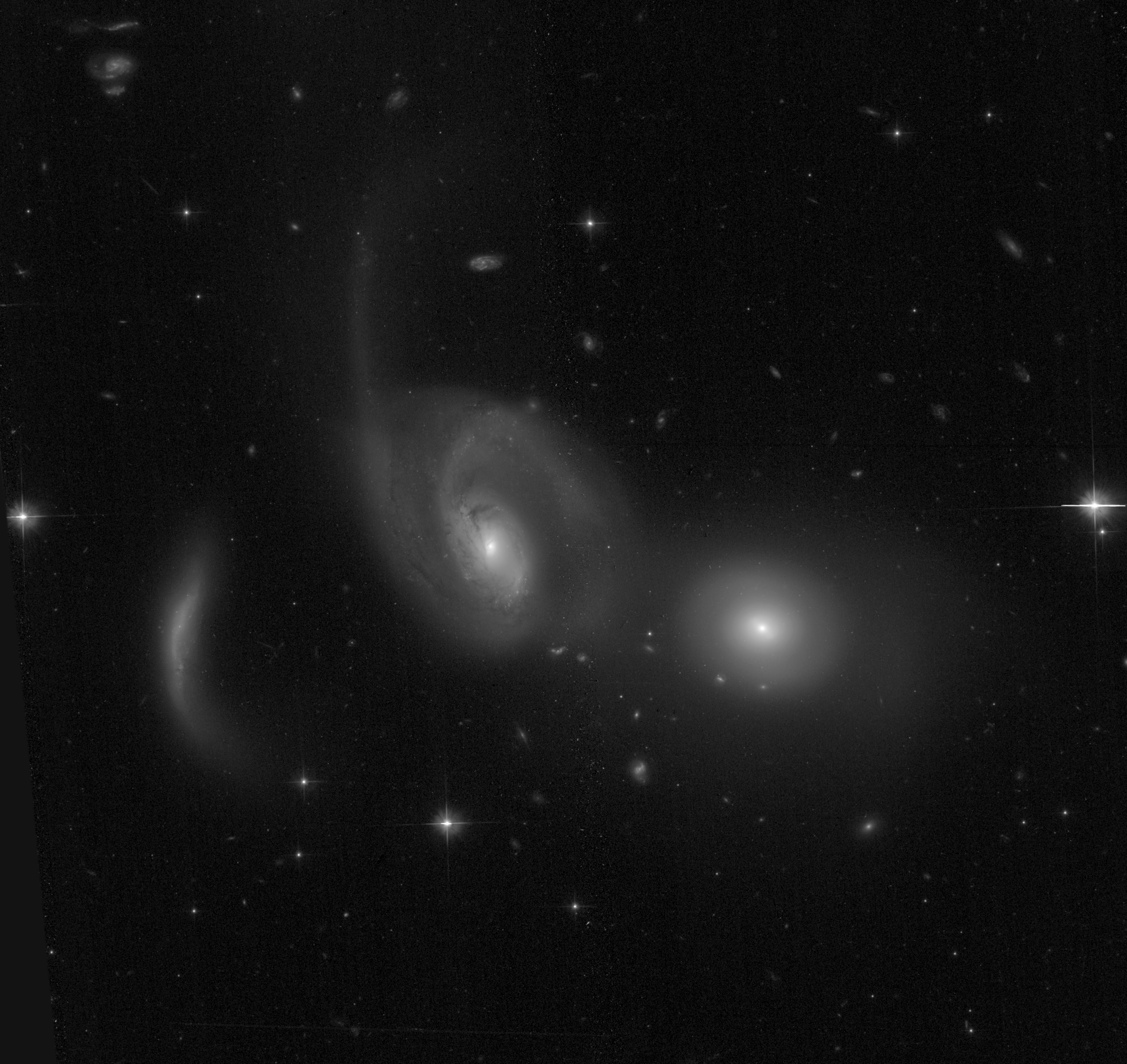
Arp 112 by the Hubble Space Telescope
