= NGC 21 =

Galaxy in the constellation Andromeda

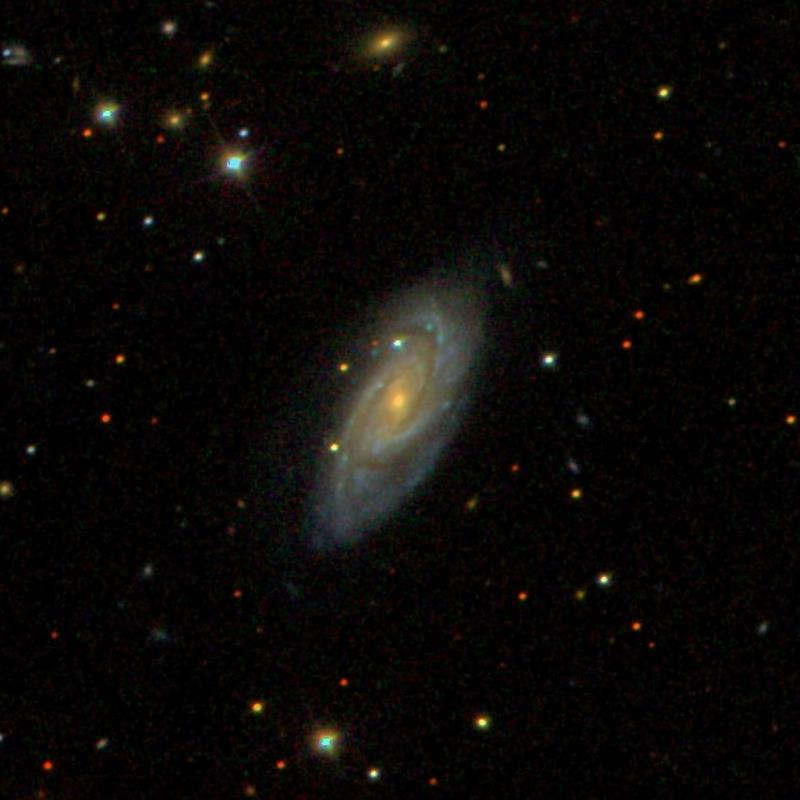
- NGC 21/NGC 29 (Sloan Digital Sky Survey)

Observation data (J 2000.0 epoch)
- Constellation: Andromeda
- Right ascension: 00^{h} 10^{m} 46.9^{s}
- Declination: +33° 21′ 10″
- Redshift: 0.015911
- Heliocentric radial velocity: 4,770 ± 4 km/s
- Distance: 234 ± 29 Mly (71.7 ± 8.9 Mpc)
- Apparent magnitude (V): +12.8
- Absolute magnitude (V): -20.75

Characteristics
- Type: SAB(s)bc
- Apparent size (V): 1.2′ × 0.59′

Other designations
- IRAS 00082+3304, NGC 29, UGC 100, MCG +05-01-048, PGC 767, CGCG 499-066

NGC 21 (also known as NGC 29) is a spiral galaxy in the constellation Andromeda. It was discovered by German-British astronomer William Herschel on 26 November 1790. Lewis Swift observed it again in 1885, leading to its double listing in the New General Catalogue.

== NGC 7831 Group ==
According to A.M. Garcia, NGC 21 is a member of the NGC 7831 group (also known as LGG 1), which contains at least 18 galaxies, including NGC 13, NGC 19, NGC 20, NGC 39, NGC 43, NGC 7805, NGC 7806, NGC 7819, and NGC 7836.

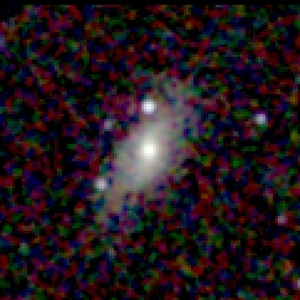
NGC 21 in Infrared

== See also ==
- NGC
- List of NGC objects (1–1000)
- List of NGC objects
- Galaxy
