= NGC 43 =

Galaxy in the constellation Andromeda

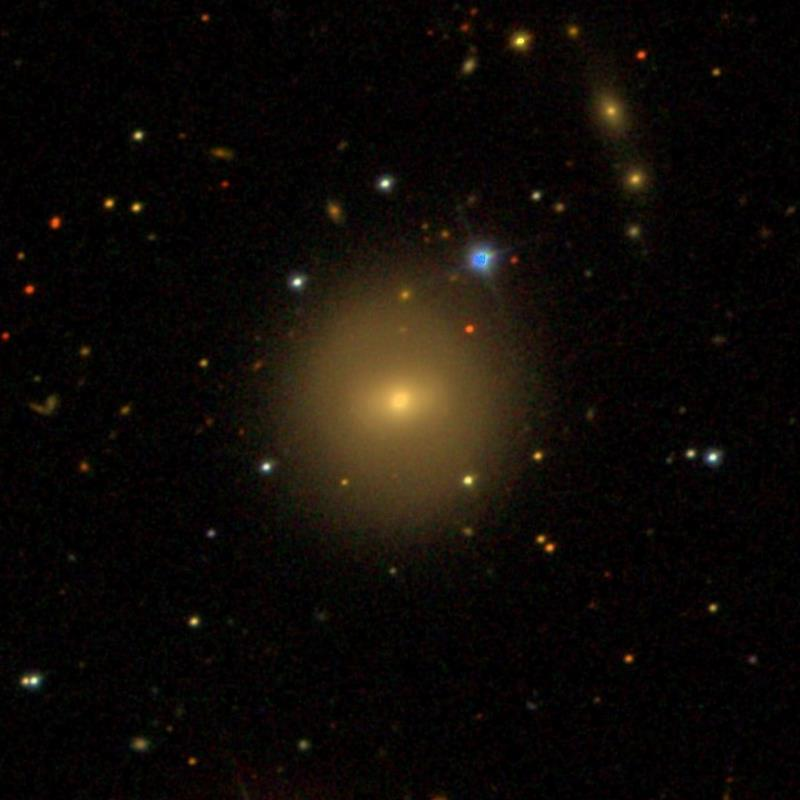
- SDSS image of NGC 43

Observation data (J2000 epoch)
- Constellation: Andromeda
- Right ascension: 00^{h} 13^{m} 00.7647^{s}
- Declination: +30° 54′ 54.901″
- Redshift: 0.015961±0.000033
- Heliocentric radial velocity: 4,785±10 km/s
- Distance: 65.0 ± 4.6 Mpc (212 ± 15.1 million ly)
- Apparent magnitude (V): 13.6

Characteristics
- Type: SB0
- Size: ~122,300 ly (37.50 kpc) (estimated)
- Apparent size (V): 1.6′ × 1.5′

Other designations
- UGC 120, MCG +05-01-054, PGC 875, CGCG 499-079

NGC 43 is a lenticular galaxy in the constellation Andromeda. It has a diameter of approximately 37 kiloparsecs (122,000 light-years). It was discovered by British astronomer John Herschel on 11 November 1827.

== NGC 7831 Group ==
According to A.M. Garcia, NGC 43 is a member of the NGC 7831 group (also known as LGG 1), which contains at least 18 galaxies, including NGC 13, NGC 19, NGC 20, NGC 21, NGC 39, NGC 7805, NGC 7806, NGC 7819, and NGC 7836.

== See also ==
- NGC
- List of NGC objects (1–1000)
- List of NGC objects
- Galaxy
