= NGC 39 =

Spiral galaxy in the constellation Andromeda

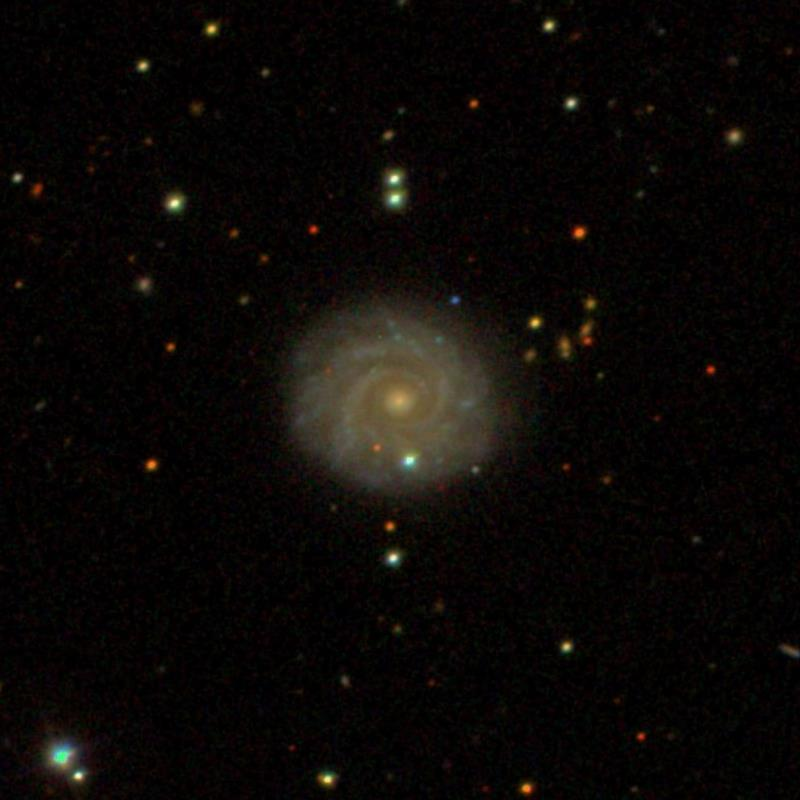
- SDSS image of NGC 39

Observation data (J2000 epoch)
- Constellation: Andromeda
- Right ascension: 00^{h} 12^{m} 18.8525^{s}
- Declination: +31° 03′ 39.946″
- Redshift: 0.016201
- Heliocentric radial velocity: 4857 ± 11 km/s
- Distance: 217.9 ± 15.3 Mly (66.80 ± 4.69 Mpc)
- Group or cluster: NGC 7831 Group (LGG 1)
- Apparent magnitude (V): 13.92

Characteristics
- Type: SA(rs)c
- Apparent size (V): 1.2′ × 1.0′

Other designations
- IRAS F00097+3047, UGC 114, MCG +05-01-052, PGC 852, CGCG 499-076

NGC 39 is an unbarred spiral galaxy in the constellation Andromeda. Its velocity with respect to the cosmic microwave background is 4529 ± 25 km/s, which corresponds to a Hubble distance of 217.9 ± 15.3 Mly (66.80 ± 4.69 Mpc). It was discovered by German-British astronomer William Herschel on 2 November 1790.

== NGC 7831 Group ==
According to A.M. Garcia, NGC 39 is a member of the NGC 7831 group (also known as LGG 1), which contains at least 18 galaxies, including NGC 13, NGC 19, NGC 20, NGC 21, NGC 43, NGC 7805, NGC 7806, NGC 7819, and NGC 7836.

== Supernova ==
One supernova has been observed in NGC 39: SN 2024rbc (Type Ib, mag. 20.5443) was discovered by the Zwicky Transient Facility on 3 August 2024.

== See also ==
- List of NGC objects (1–1000)
