= NGC 20 =

Lenticular galaxy in the Andromeda constellation

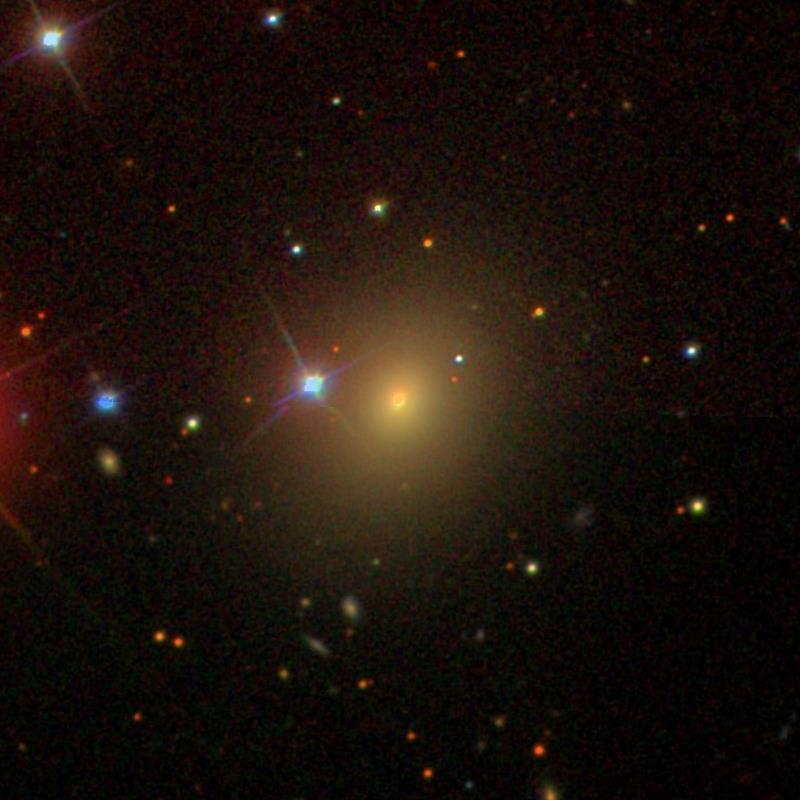
- NGC 20 imaged by SDSS

Observation data
- Constellation: Andromeda
- Right ascension: 00^{h} 09^{m} 32.8^{s}
- Declination: +33° 18′ 31″
- Redshift: 0.016581
- Heliocentric radial velocity: 4971 ± 49 km/s
- Apparent magnitude (V): 14.04

Characteristics
- Type: Lenticular

Other designations
- NGC 6, NGC 20, UGC 00084, CGCG 498-082, CGCG 499-054, CGCG 0006.9+3303, MCG +05-01-036, 2MASX J00093270+3318310, 2MASXi J0009327+331831, USGC U008 NED04, MAPS-PP O_1257_0037278, PGC 000679, UZC J000932.7+331831, LGG 001:G93 008

NGC 20 (also known as NGC 6) is a lenticular galaxy in the constellation of Andromeda.

The double name of the galaxy is due to the history of its discoveries: for the first time it was discovered on September 18, 1857, by Irish astronomer R. J. Mitchell, an assistant to William Parsons, Lord Rosse; however, the information was not published until Lawrence Parsons, the son of W. Parsons, did so in 1880. The galaxy was independently rediscovered by Herman Schultz on October 16, 1866, and by Lewis Swift in 1885. As a result, J. L. E. Dreyer cataloged it twice in the New General Catalogue, as NGC 6 (from Swift's observation) and NGC 20 (from Lord Rosse's).

== NGC 7831 Group ==
According to A.M. Garcia, NGC 20 is a member of the NGC 7831 group (also known as LGG 1), which contains at least 18 galaxies, including NGC 13, NGC 19, NGC 21, NGC 39, NGC 43, NGC 7805, NGC 7806, NGC 7819, and NGC 7836.

== See also ==
- NGC 19
- NGC 21
- NGC
- List of NGC objects (1–1000)
- List of NGC objects
- Galaxy
