= NGC 19 =

Galaxy in the constellation Andromeda

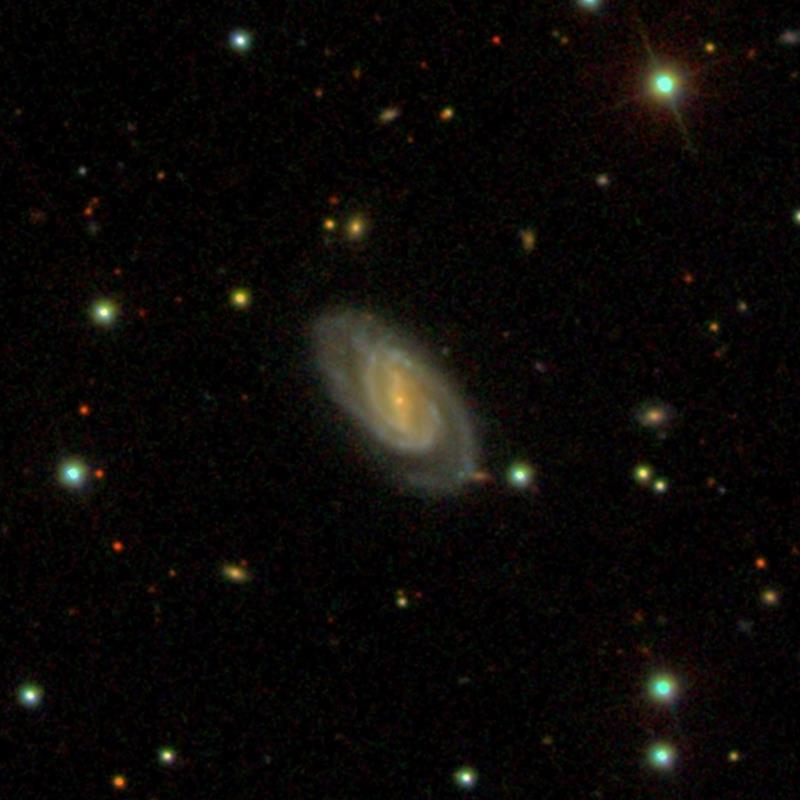
- NGC 19 imaged by SDSS

Observation data (J2000 epoch)
- Constellation: Andromeda
- Right ascension: 00^{h} 10^{m} 40.8673^{s}
- Declination: +32° 58′ 58.633″
- Redshift: 0.015971
- Heliocentric radial velocity: 4788 ± 2 km/s
- Distance: 202.16 ± 9.32 Mly (61.983 ± 2.857 Mpc)
- Group or cluster: NGC 7831 Group (LGG 1)
- Apparent magnitude (V): 13.99

Characteristics
- Type: SB(r)bc
- Size: ~73,300 ly (22.48 kpc) (estimated)
- Apparent size (V): 1.2′ × 0.6′

Other designations
- IRAS 00080+3242, UGC 98, MCG +05-01-046, PGC 759, CGCG 499-065

NGC 19 is a spiral galaxy in the constellation Andromeda. Its velocity with respect to the cosmic microwave background is 4,465±23 km/s, which corresponds to a Hubble distance of 214.8 ± 15.1 Mly (65.85 ± 4.62 Mpc). However, 12 non-redshift measurements give a closer distance of 202.16 ± 9.32 Mly (61.983 ± 2.857 Mpc). It was discovered by American astronomer Lewis Swift on 20 September 1885. It is often incorrectly listed as a duplicate of NGC 21.

== NGC 7831 Group ==
According to A.M. Garcia, NGC 19 is a member of the NGC 7831 group (also known as LGG 1), which contains at least 18 galaxies, including NGC 13, NGC 20, NGC 21, NGC 39 NGC 43, NGC 7805, NGC 7806, NGC 7819, and NGC 7836.

== See also ==
- List of NGC objects (1–1000)
