= PGC =

PGC may refer to:

- Pennsylvania Game Commission
- Persian Gulf Cup, Iran's highest association football league
- PGC (gene)
- PGC 1000714, a ring galaxy
- PGC-1α, a protein which is the master regulator of mitochondrial biogenesis
- Philippine Genome Center, a research facility in Quezon City, Philippines
- Playwrights Guild of Canada
- Postgraduate Certificate, usually written as PgC
- Presbyterian Girls' College in Warwick, Australia, now part of Scots PGC College
- Primordial germ cell
- Prince George's County, Maryland
- Principal Galaxies Catalogue
- Principle of Generic Consistency, see Alan Gewirth
- Professional Graphics Controller
- Psychiatric Genomics Consortium, founded 2007 as the Psychiatric Genome Wide Association Consortium
- Punggol Coast MRT station, Singapore; by station abbreviation
- Pusat Grosir Cililitan, a shopping mall in Jakarta, Indonesia
  - PGC (Transjakarta), a bus station located inside the mall
- The University of Pennsylvania Glee Club
