= NGC 11 =

Spiral galaxy in the constellation Andromeda

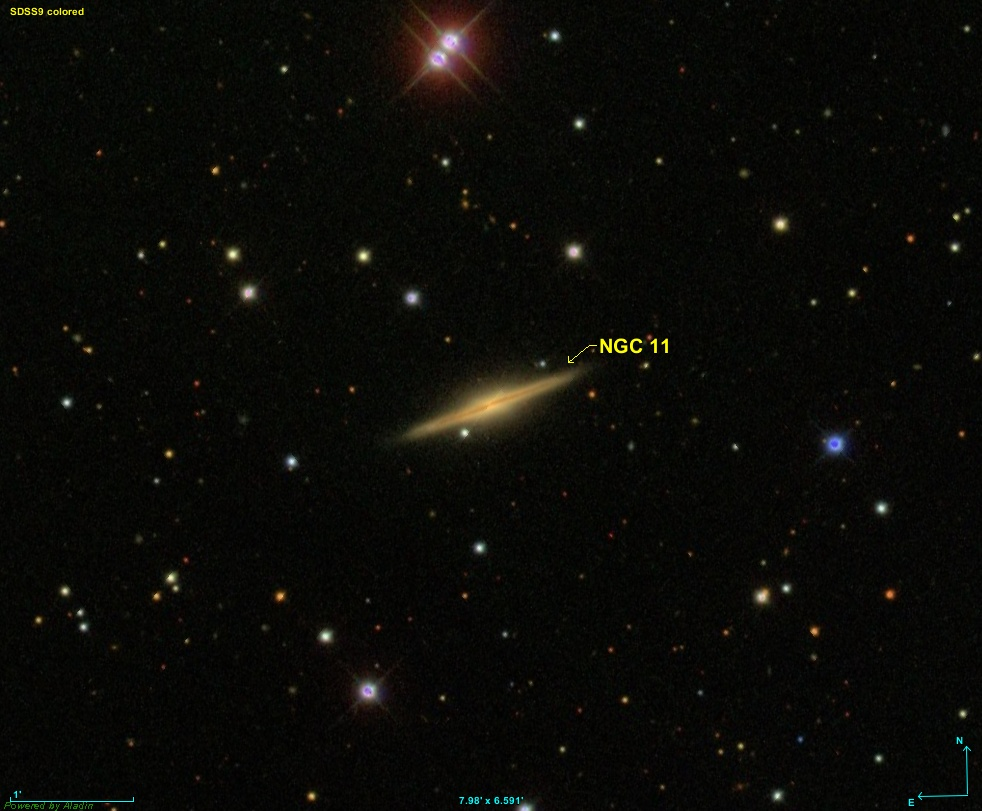
- NGC 11 Sloan Digital Sky Survey

Observation data (J2000 epoch)
- Constellation: Andromeda
- Right ascension: 00^{h} 08^{m} 42.5^{s}
- Declination: +37° 26′ 52″
- Redshift: 0.014640
- Heliocentric radial velocity: 4389 ± 20 km/s
- Apparent magnitude (B): 14.5
- Absolute magnitude (V): -19.19

Characteristics
- Type: Sa

Other designations
- UGC 73, PGC 642, MCG+06-01-015

NGC 11 is a spiral galaxy located in the constellation Andromeda. It is located at right ascension 00^{h} 08^{m} 42.5^{s}; declination +37° 26′ 53″; under J2000.0 coordinates and was discovered by Édouard Stephan on October 24, 1881.

== See also ==
- NGC 10
- NGC 12
- List of NGC objects (1–1000)
