= Transjakarta Corridor 5 =

Bus rapid transit route in Indonesia

- Ancol – Kampung Melayu
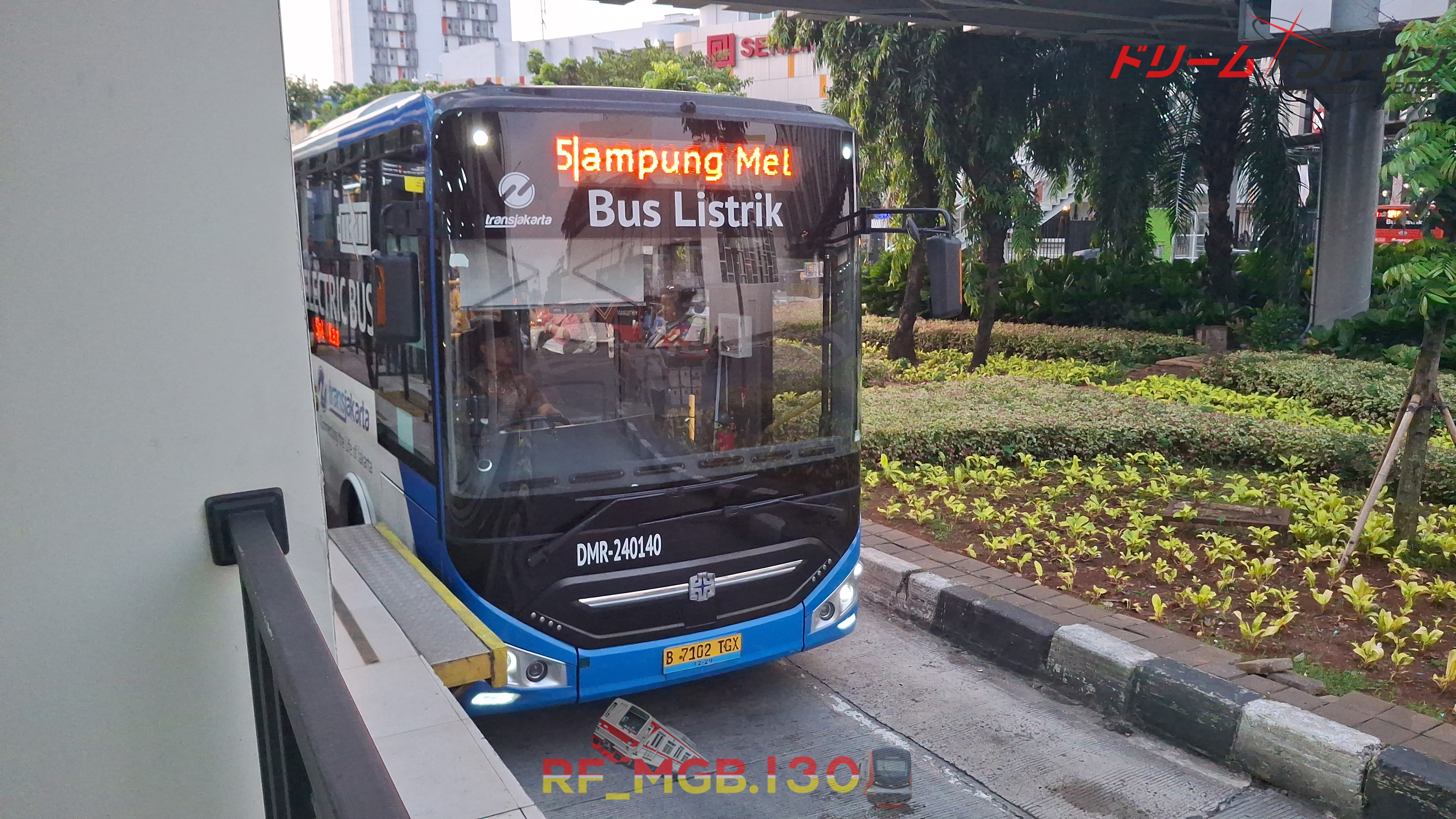
- The Zhongtong electric bus fleet that serves Corridor 5 at Jaga Jakarta BRT station

Overview
- System: Transjakarta
- Operator: PT. Transportasi Jakarta (TJ, infrastructures and staffs); Perum DAMRI (DMR, fleets and drivers); Mayasari Bakti (MB/MYS, fleets and drivers); Steady Safe (SAF, fleets and drivers)
- Began service: 27 January 2007

Route
- Route type: Street-level Bus rapid transit
- Locale: North Jakarta; Central Jakarta; East Jakarta
- Length: 13.53 km
- Stations: 18

Transjakarta Corridor 5 is a bus rapid transit corridor in Jakarta, Indonesia, operated by Transjakarta. The corridor connects Ancol Dreamland in North Jakarta with the Kampung Melayu Bus Terminal in Jatinegara, East Jakarta.

The route goes through Gunung Sahari, Pasar Senen, Kramat Raya, Salemba Raya, Matraman Raya, Jatinegara Barat, and Jatinegara Timur Streets. The stretch between Pademangan and Jatinegara BRT stations runs parallel to the Cikarang Loop Line of the KRL Commuterline; with two BRT stations, Matraman Baru and Bali Mester, being directly linked to the Matraman and Jatinegara railway stations.

== History ==
Trial runs for Corridors 4, 5, 6, and 7 were conducted in December 2006. All four corridors were inaugurated by then Governor of Jakarta, Sutiyoso, on 27 January 2007; the inauguration ceremony took place at the Ancol BRT station as the north termini of Corridor 5.

== List of BRT stations ==
- All stations are served by buses 24 hours a day.
- Stations indicated by a ← sign have a one-way service towards Ancol only. Stations indicated by a → sign have a one-way service towards Kampung Melayu only.

Corridor 5 (Ancol – Kampung Melayu)
Code	Station name	Transfer/Notes	Bus terminal or train station nearby
Stations in order: From top to bottom (downwards) towards Kampung Melayu (→); from bottom to top (upwards) towards Ancol (←)
5 01	Ancol	Two separate buildings for opposing directions require exiting paid area to transfer: Part 1: Arrivals only; Part 2: Towards Kampung Melayu (→)	Ancol Marina (Planned) Marina Ancol Wharf
5 02	Pademangan	Pademangan	
5 03 12 09	Gunung Sahari	Gunung Sahari	
5 04 12 10	Jembatan Merah	Jembatan Merah	Rajawali (Planned)
5 05	Pasar Baru Timur	Pasar Baru Timur	
5 06	Lapangan Banteng	Lapangan Banteng	
5 07	Jaga Jakarta	Senen Toyota Rangga (via skybridge)	Senen (Planned) Pasar Senen Senen Bus Terminal
5 08	Pal Putih	Pal Putih	
5 09	Kramat Sentiong	Kramat Sentiong	
5 10	Salemba	Salemba	
5 11	Paseban	Paseban	
5 12	Matraman	Matraman Flyover Pramuka (via skybridge)	
5 13	Tegalan	Tegalan	
5 14	Kesatrian	Kesatrian	
5 15	Matraman Baru	Matraman Baru	Matraman
5 16	Bali Mester →	Bali Mester Stasiun Jatinegara (via skybridge)	Jatinegara
5 17 11 15	Jatinegara →	Jatinegara	
Towards Ancol (←) heads straight to Matraman Baru
5 18 7 14 11 16	Kampung Melayu	Kampung Melayu	Kampung Melayu Bus Terminal

== Cross-corridor route ==
=== Route 5C (Cililitan – Juanda) ===
- Route 5C originally connects Cililitan and Harmoni BRT stations. However, with the construction of Phase 2A of the Jakarta MRT, it no longer serves Harmoni BRT station and instead goes through Monumen Nasional BRT station, terminating at Juanda BRT station since 4 March 2023. This temporary route change will continue until the MRT construction is completed, which is expected in either 2027 or 2029.
- Station indicated by a ← sign have a one-way service towards Cililitan only. Stations indicated by a → sign have a one-way service towards Juanda only.

Route 5C (Cililitan – Juanda)
Code	Station name	Transfer/Notes	Bus terminal or train station nearby
Stations in order: From top to bottom (downwards) towards Juanda (→); from bottom to top (upwards) towards Cililitan (←)
7 07	Cililitan	Cililitan	Cililitan Bus Terminal PGC (transfer outside paid area)
7 08 10 21	Cawang Cililitan	Cawang Cililitan	
7 09 9 03 10 20	Cawang Sentral	Cawang Sentral	
7 10 9 04	Cawang	Cawang	Cawang
7 11	Cawang Baru	Cawang Baru	
7 12	Gelanggang Remaja	Gelanggang Remaja	
7 13	Bidara Cina	Bidara Cina	
5 18 7 14 11 16	Kampung Melayu	Kampung Melayu	Kampung Melayu Bus Terminal
Towards Juanda (→) heads straight to Matraman Baru
5 17 11 15	Jatinegara ←	Jatinegara	
5 16	Bali Mester ←	Bali Mester Stasiun Jatinegara (via skybridge)	Jatinegara
5 15	Matraman Baru	Matraman Baru	Matraman
5 14	Kesatrian	Kesatrian	
5 13	Tegalan	Tegalan	
5 12	Matraman	Matraman Flyover Pramuka (via skybridge)	
5 11	Paseban	Paseban	
5 10	Salemba	Salemba	
5 09	Kramat Sentiong	Kramat Sentiong	
5 08	Pal Putih	Pal Putih	
2 24	Kwitang →	Kwitang	Kwitang (Planned)
2 22	Balai Kota →	Balai Kota	
1 14 2 21	Monumen Nasional →	Monumen Nasional	Monas (U/C)
2 19 3 14	Pecenongan →	Pecenongan	
Towards Juanda (→) heads straight to Juanda
Towards Cililitan (←) heads straight to Pal Putih
5 06	Lapangan Banteng ←	Lapangan Banteng	
2 18 3 15	Juanda	Juanda	Juanda

== Special route ==
=== Route 5H (Pecenongan – Ancol) ===
- Only operates during holiday seasons, such as Eid al-Fitr and Christmas holidays. The route is currently inactive.
- Stations indicated by a → sign have a one way service towards Ancol only.

Route 5H (Pecenongan – Ancol)
Code	Station name	Transfer/Notes	Bus terminal or train station nearby
Stations in order: From top to bottom (downwards) towards Ancol (→); from bottom to top (upwards) towards Pecenongan (←)
2 19 3 14	Pecenongan	Pecenongan	
2 18 3 15	Juanda	Some buses terminate here and require all passengers to alight	Juanda
2 18 3 15	Juanda	Juanda	Juanda
3 16	Pasar Baru →	Pasar Baru	
Towards Pecenongan (←) heads straight to Juanda
5 05	Pasar Baru Timur	Pasar Baru Timur	
5 04 12 10	Jembatan Merah	Jembatan Merah	Rajawali (Planned)
5 03 12 09	Gunung Sahari	Gunung Sahari	
5 02	Pademangan	Pademangan	
5 01	Ancol	Two separate buildings for opposing directions require exiting paid area to transfer: Part 1: Arrivals only; Part 2: Towards Pecenongan (←)	Ancol Marina (Planned) Marina Ancol Wharf
5 01	Ancol	Ancol	Ancol Marina (Planned) Marina Ancol Wharf

== Fleets ==
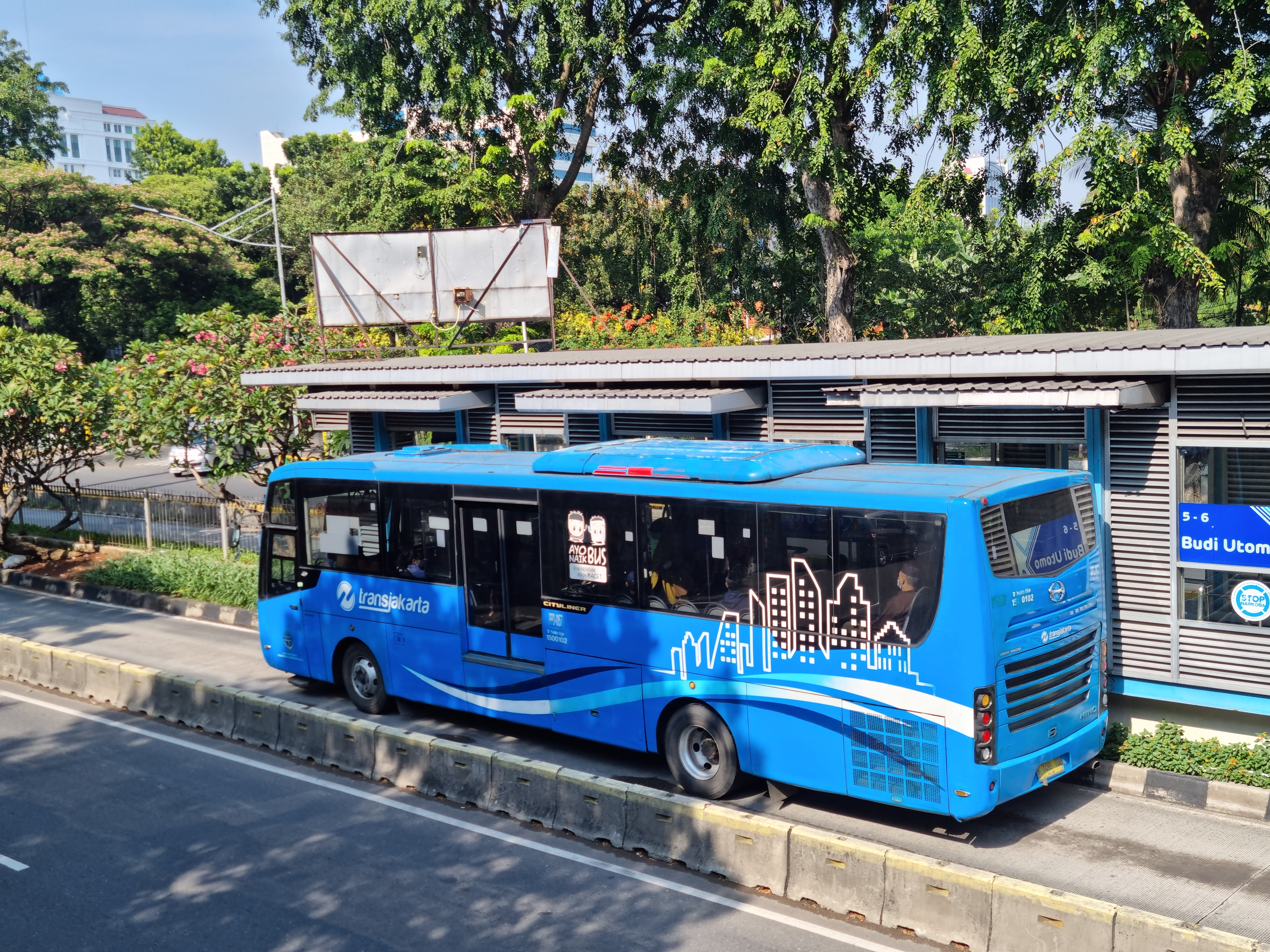
The Hino bus fleet that serves Corridor 5 at Lapangan Banteng (then-named Budi Utomo) BRT station

Information correct as of January 2025

- Perum DAMRI (DMR):
  - Zhongtong LCK6180GC Euro 5, white-blue
  - Zhongtong LCK6126EVGRA1 e-bus, white-blue (also serving as the night bus (22:00-05:00))
- Mayasari Bakti (MB/MYS):
  - Mercedes-Benz OH 1626 NG A/T, white-blue (MYS)
- Steady Safe:
  - Volvo B11R 6×2 A/T, white-blue

== Depots ==
- Mayasari Bakti (MB/MYS):
  - Cijantung
- Perum DAMRI (DMR):
  - Klender
  - Pulo Gadung
- Steady Safe (SAF):
  - Klender

== Incidents ==
- On 3 July 2015, one bus that was serving Corridor 5 caught fire when the bus stopped at Salemba UI (now known as Salemba) BRT station. There were no casualties.
- On 24 May 2017, two explosions occurred at the Kampung Melayu BRT Station. The police confirmed the blasts were caused by multiple explosive devices found in the toilet and another part of the terminal. The bombings resulted in five deaths, including three policemen and two attackers. Eleven injured individuals were taken to various hospitals in East Jakarta.
- On 16 July 2022, a middle-aged woman died after being struck and run over by a bus near the Kramat Sentiong NU (now known as Kramat Sentiong) BRT station. She sustained severe head and hand injuries, and the driver involved was identified as the suspect.

== See also ==
- Transjakarta
  - List of Transjakarta corridors
