= Higher Education Commission =

Higher Education Commission or Commission on Higher Education may refer to:

== Asia ==
- Higher Education Commission (Pakistan)
- Commission on Higher Education, Philippines
- Office of the Higher Education Commission, Thailand
- Punjab Higher Education Commission, Pakistan

== North America ==
- Higher Learning Commission, United States
- Middle States Commission on Higher Education, United States

== See also ==
- University Grants Commission (disambiguation)
- University Grants Committee (disambiguation)
