= Cililitan (Transjakarta) =

Bus rapid transit station in Jakarta, Indonesia

7 07 Cililitan
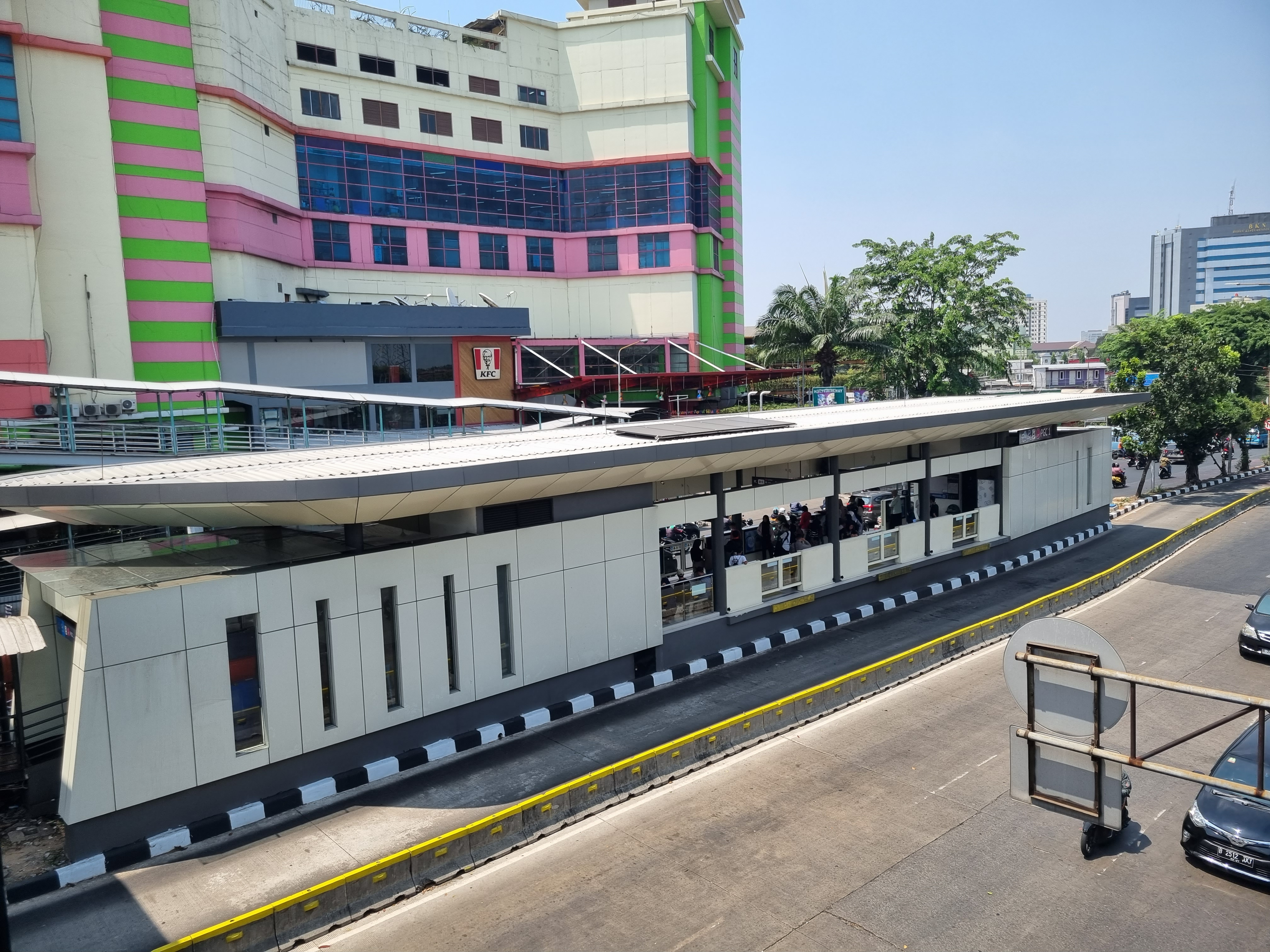
- The station viewed from the access bridge

General information
- Other names: PGC Luar
- Location: Mayjen Sutoyo Street, Cililitan, Kramat Jati, East Jakarta 13640, Indonesia
- Coordinates: 6.262482°S 106.866361°E
- System: Transjakarta bus rapid transit station
- Owner: Transjakarta
- Operator: Transjakarta
- Lines: List of Transjakarta corridors#Cross-corridor routes List of TransJakarta corridors#Corridor 7 List of TransJakarta corridors#Cross-corridor routes
- Platforms: Single island platform

Construction
- Structure type: At-grade
- Cycle facilities: No

Other information
- Status: In service

History
- Opened: 27 January 2007
- Rebuilt: 15 February 2023; 3 years ago
- Former names: PGC 1

Services
Preceding		Following
Cawang Cililitan towards Juanda	Corridor 5 Route 5C Terminus	Terminus
Kramat Jati towards Kampung Rambutan	Corridor 7	Cawang Cililitan towards Kampung Melayu
Terminus	Corridor 9 Route 9A Terminus	Cawang Cililitan towards Grogol Reformasi
Cawang Cililitan towards Tanjung Priok	Corridor 10 Transfer outside paid area transfer at PGC	Terminus
Location

Cililitan is a Transjakarta bus rapid transit station located on Mayjen Sutoyo Street, Cililitan, Kramat Jati, East Jakarta, Indonesia, serving Corridor 7. The station is named after the subdistrict it is located in.

This station was originally named PGC 1, named after the adjacent Pusat Grosir Cililitan (lit. 'Cililitan Wholesales Center') shopping mall. The station is located near, but is not connected to, the PGC BRT station that serves Corridor 10 and was formerly named PGC 2. Passengers are required to exit this station, cross the street, enter the mall, and take the lift to access that station.

== History ==
The station opened on 27 January 2007 alongside the entire Corridor 7, where then Jakarta Governor Sutiyoso conducted the ceremonial ribbon cutting at the linkway between the BRT station and PGC mall. As it was launched together with Corridor 5, Transjakarta also operated its supplementary service routes: Cililitan–Harmoni (now route 5C, modified to make a loop around Monumen Nasional) and Cililitan–Ancol (later rebranded route 5D, discontinued since 2025). Later, route 9A (Cililitan–Grogol) was started upon the launch of Corridor 9.

On 5 September 2022, the station was closed for revitalisation works, alongside Jembatan Gantung, Manggarai, and Pasar Kebayoran Lama (now Kebayoran) stations. The revitalised station reopened on 15 February 2023.

Up until 2023, this station was named PGC 1. In late December 2023, Transjakarta renamed this station Cililitan, while the Corridor 10's station inside the mall was renamed PGC.

== Building and layout ==
After revitalisation works, the new station features three bus bays on each side. In addition, there are new amenities, such as priority toilets and prayer room. The metal plate floor of the skybridge was replaced with wooden boards.

The layout of the platform as of 19 July 2025 is the following:

Northwest	towards Juanda, towards Kampung Melayu and towards Grogol Reformasi	(Cawang Cililitan) →
Island platform, doors open on the right
Southeast	← (Kramat Jati) towards Kampung Rambutan

== Non-BRT bus services ==
Type	Route	Destination	Notes
Inner city feeder		Kampung Rambutan—Blok M	Outside the station
Inner city feeder		Cililitan—Blok M	Outside the station
Mikrotrans Jak Lingko	JAK 16	Cililitan—Condet	Outside the station
Mikrotrans Jak Lingko	JAK 21	Cililitan—Dwikora	Outside the station
Mikrotrans Jak Lingko	JAK 36	Cilangkap—Cililitan	Outside the station
Mikrotrans Jak Lingko	JAK 37	Cililitan—Condet via Kayu Manis	Outside the station
Mikrotrans Jak Lingko	JAK 43B	Tongtek—Cililitan	Outside the station
Mikrotrans Jak Lingko	JAK 75	Kampung Pulo—Halim via Cililitan	Outside the station

== Places nearby ==
- Pusat Grosir Cililitan
- Indonesian Army Medical Centre
- Sasana Wira Sakti Building
- Lokbin Cililitan

== Incident ==
On 2 December 2021, a Transjakarta bus crashed into a police station southwest of the station. There were no casualties, but a staff was injured and taken to the hospital. Jakarta's Regional House of Representatives demanded Transjakarta to investigate the incident. The police station was rebuilt a few weeks later.

== Gallery ==
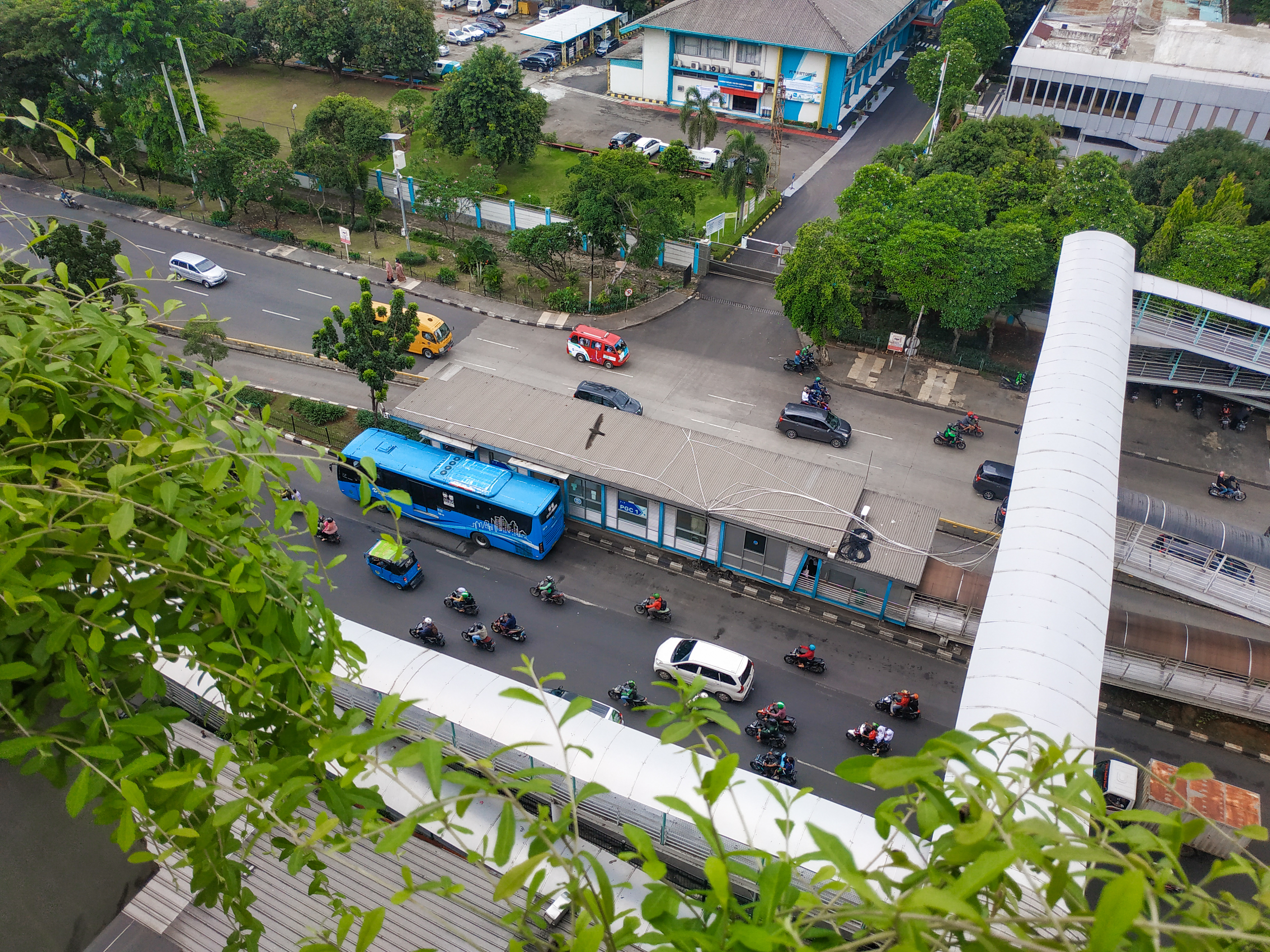
The station viewed from above the Pusat Grosir Cililitan mall

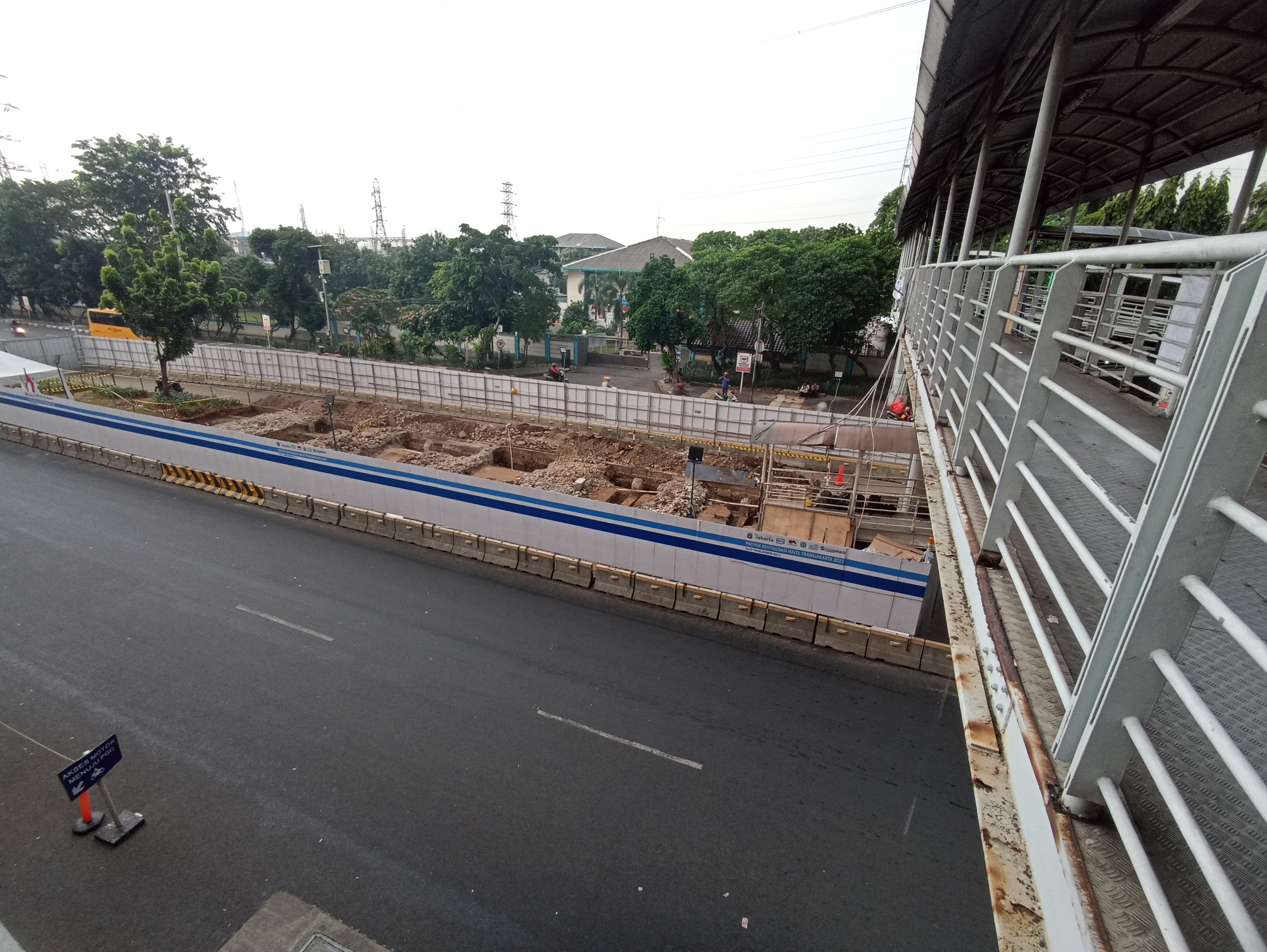
The station under revitalisation works

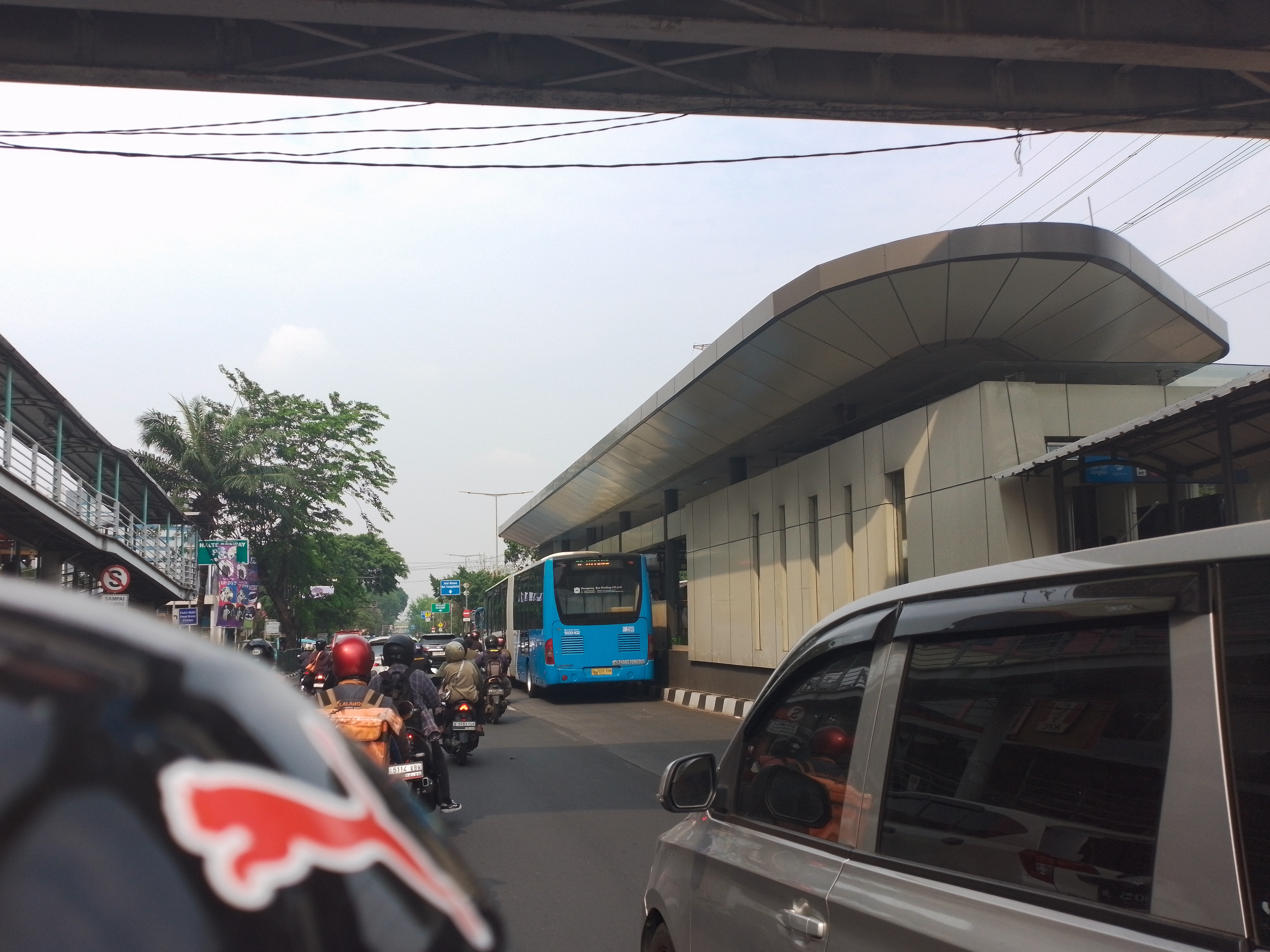
The station viewed from the street

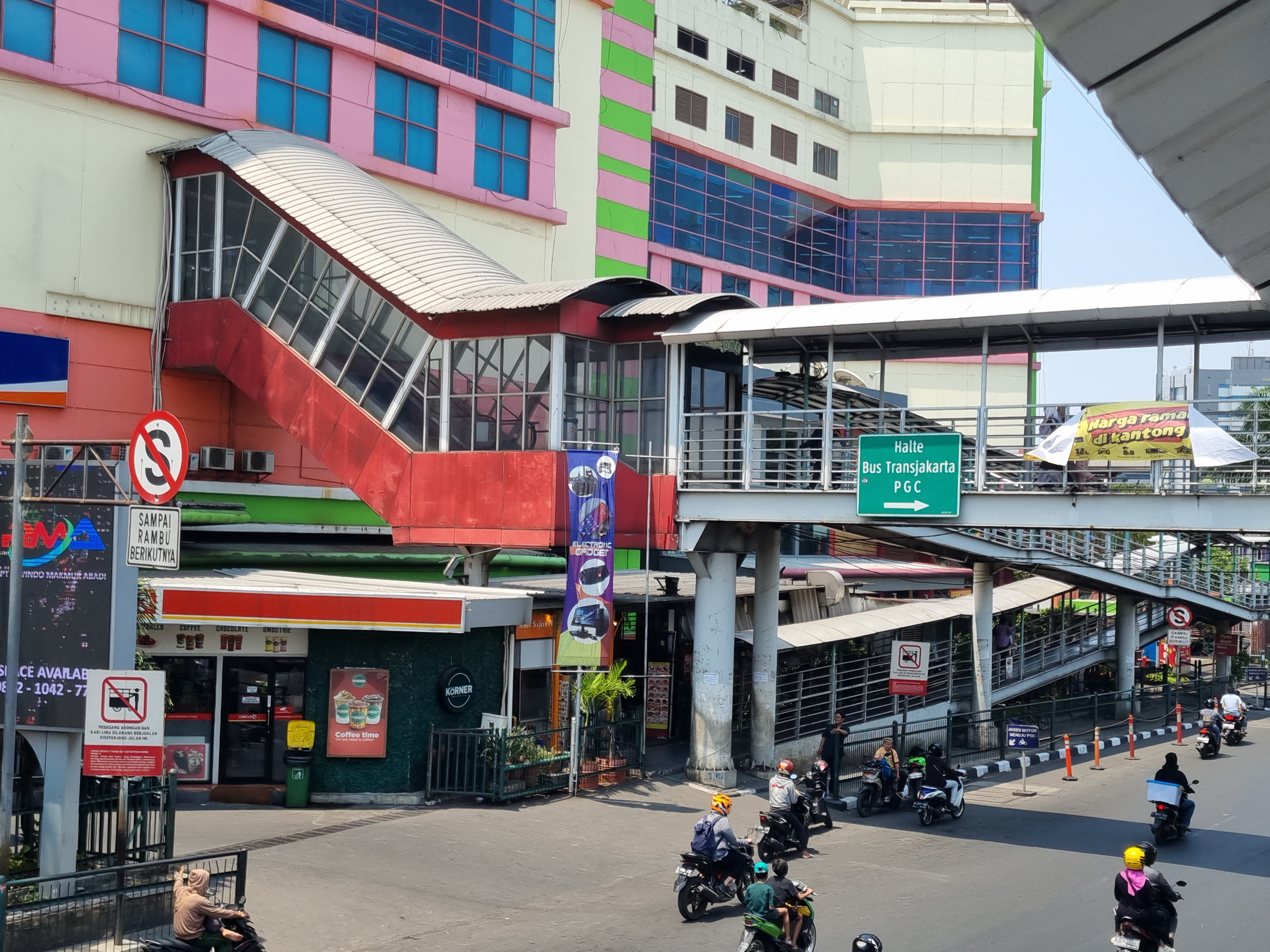
The station's skybridge access to the PGC mall

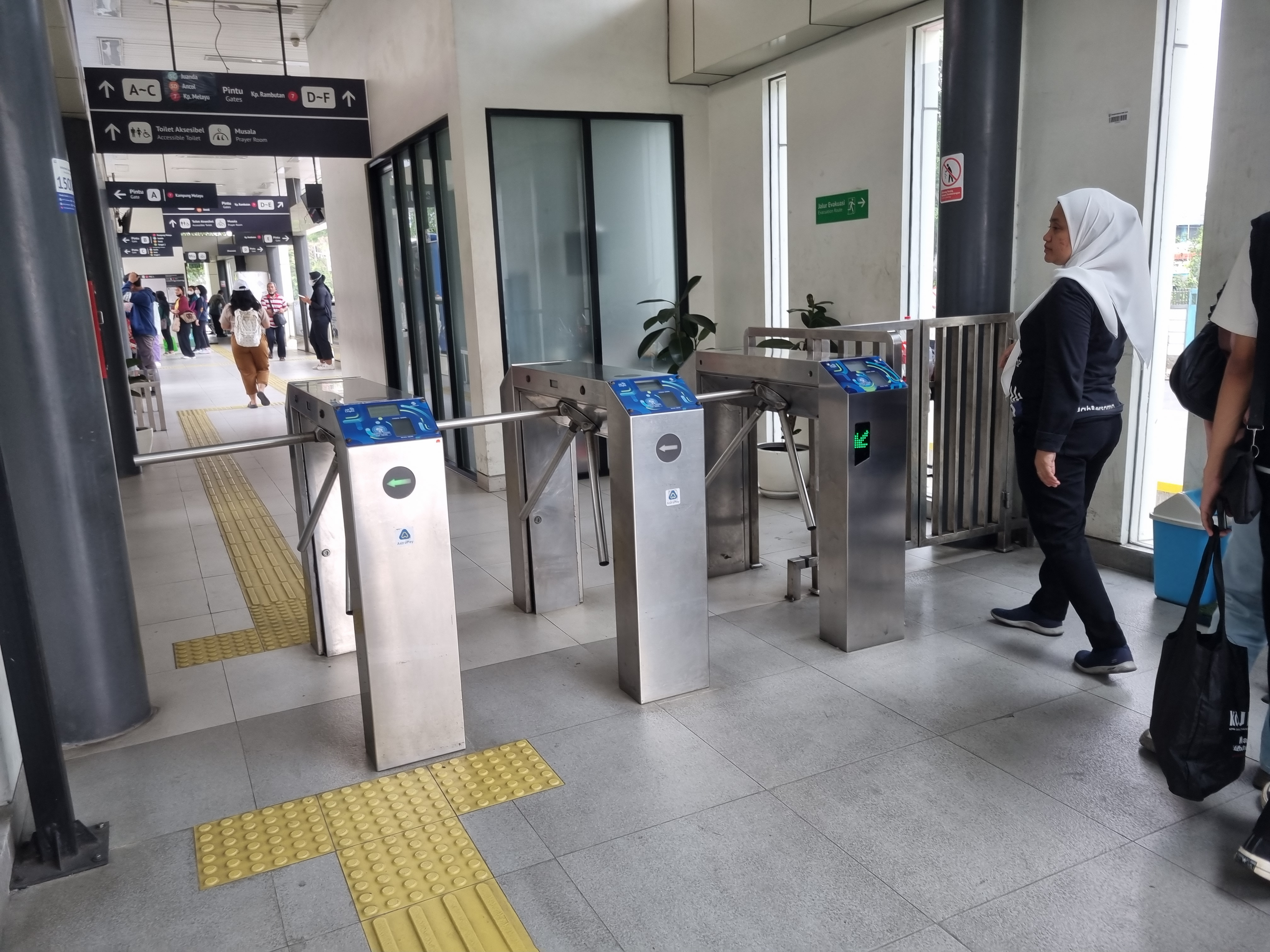
Fare gates at the entrance

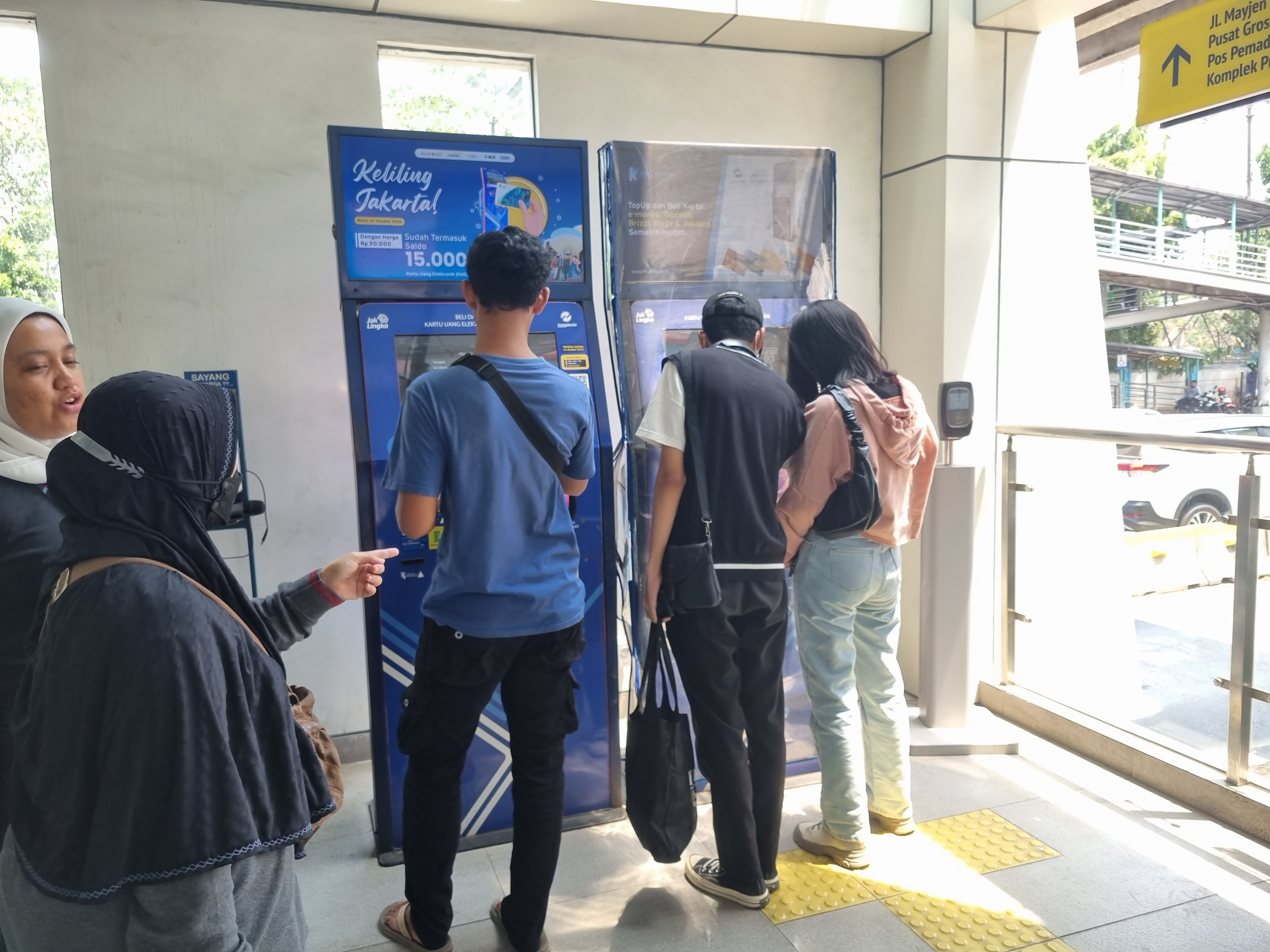
Passengers using ticket vending machines

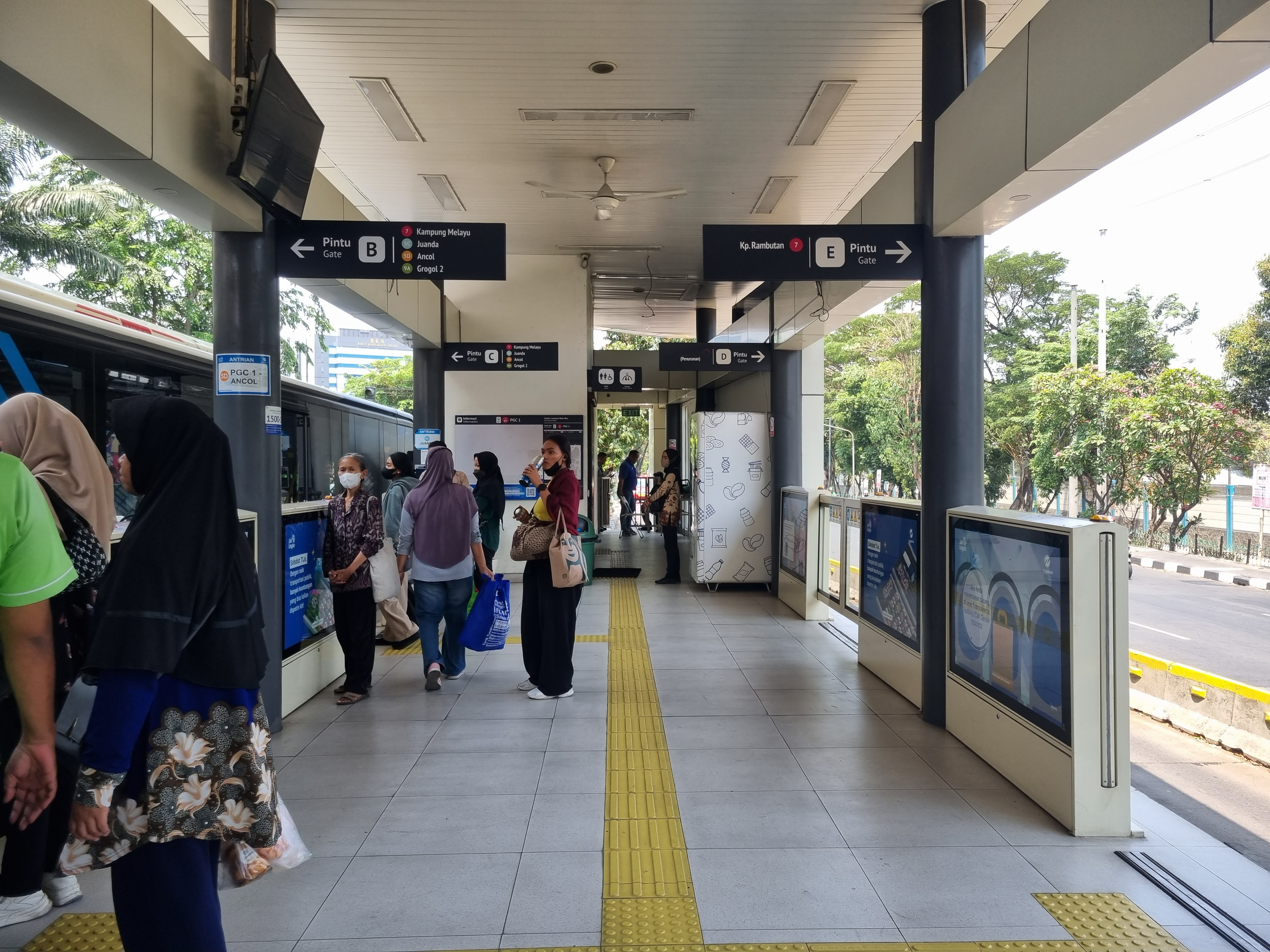
Interior of the station after revitalisation works

== See also ==
- PGC (Transjakarta)
