= University Grants Committee =

University Grants Committee may refer to:

- University Grants Committee (Hong Kong)
- University Grants Committee (United Kingdom)
- Universities New Zealand

== See also ==
- University Grants Commission (disambiguation)
- Higher Education Commission (disambiguation)
