= PGC (Transjakarta) =

Bus rapid transit station in Jakarta, Indonesia

10 22 PGC
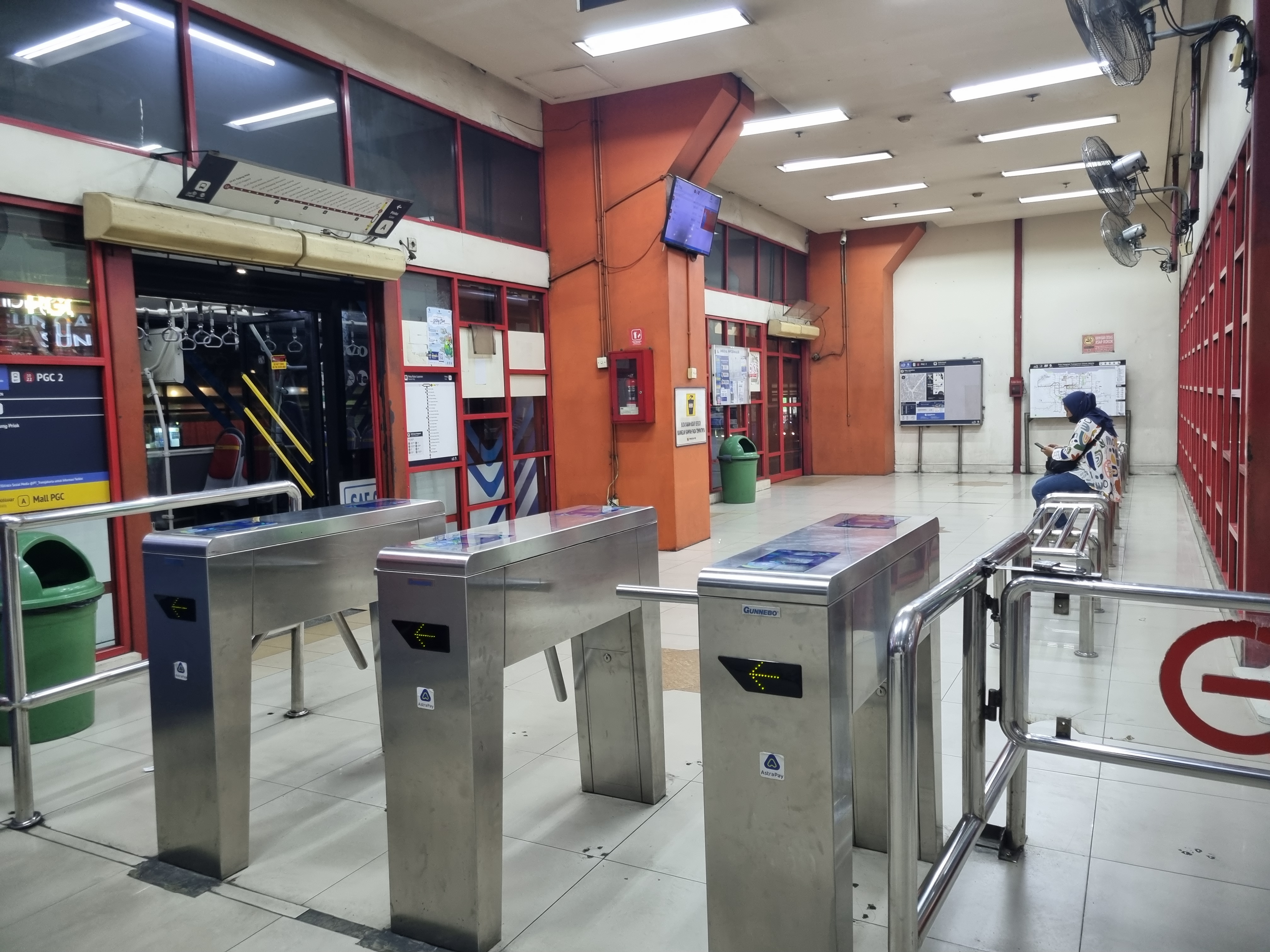
- The platform area seen from the entrance gate

General information
- Other names: PGC Dalam
- Location: Pusat Grosir Cililitan (PGC); 76 Mayjen Sutoyo Street, Cililitan, Kramat Jati, East Jakarta 13640, Indonesia
- Coordinates: 6.2625°S 106.8663°E
- System: Transjakarta bus rapid transit station
- Owner: Transjakarta
- Operator: Transjakarta
- Lines: List of TransJakarta corridors#Corridor 10
- Platforms: Two side platforms and two island platforms (reserved for non-BRT services) with separate paid area for each platform

Construction
- Structure type: At-grade
- Cycle facilities: No

Other information
- Status: In service

History
- Opened: 16 June 2010
- Former names: PGC 2

Services
Preceding		Following
Cawang Cililitan towards Tanjung Priok	Corridor 10 Terminus	Terminus
Cawang Cililitan towards Juanda	Corridor 5 Route 5C Transfer outside paid area transfer at Cililitan	Terminus
Kramat Jati towards Kampung Rambutan	Corridor 7 Transfer outside paid area transfer at Cililitan	Cawang towards Kampung Melayu
Terminus	Corridor 9 Route 9A Transfer outside paid area transfer at Cililitan	Cawang Cililitan towards Grogol Reformasi
Location

PGC is a Transjakarta bus rapid transit station located in the Pusat Grosir Cililitan (PGC, lit. 'Cililitan Wholesales Center') shopping mall in Cililitan, Kramat Jati, East Jakarta, Indonesia. It is the southern terminus of Corridor 10, and is named after the mall it is located in.

The station is not directly connected to Cililitan station outside the mall, which serves Corridor 7. Passengers are required to exit the paid area, take the lift to Level 2, exit through the eastern exit of the mall and cross a skybridge to access the Cililitan station.

== History ==
The station opened on 16 June 2010, six years after the opening of Pusat Grosir Cililitan. The shopping mall itself stands on the former site of the Cililitan bus terminal, which had already been replaced by those in Kampung Rambutan. Before Corridor 10 commenced service, the station opened to serve passengers alighting from routes 5C (Cililitan–Juanda) and 5D (Cililitan–Ancol) buses who were visiting the mall. Route 5D ceased its operations on 1 March 2025. The station originally was named PGC 2, while the station outside was named PGC 1. However, in 2023, the station outside was renamed Cililitan, while this station was renamed simply PGC.

The non-BRT bus stop "PGC Dalam", which is reserved for Mikrotrans buses, was closed on 20 June 2025 for renovation works. Route 5C was also temporarily shortened and terminated at Cawang Cililitan from 17 July 2025. All services returned to normalcy on 30 August 2025.

In September 2025, Transjakarta amended routes 5C and 9A, which no longer terminate at this station and instead require passengers to alight at Cililitan station outside the trade centre.

== Building and layout ==
The station consists of multiple side and island platforms. However, the station name "PGC" generally only refers to Corridor 10's platform located near the "Halte Walk" food court and culinary area, with two bus bays, labelled A and B.

There are three lanes served by two island platforms and two side platforms. Lane 1's front platform (Bus Bays A-B) is reserved for Corridor 10 departure towards Tanjung Priok, while the back platform is for arrivals only. Lane 2's back platform is temporarily out of service at the moment, but it is usually used for arrivals of 5C and 9A buses, while the front platform is unused. Lane 3 is reserved for Mikrotrans buses, with a back platform for alighting and a front platform for boarding. Lane 1 and Lane 2 have two paid areas each: one for the departure (front) platform and another for the arrival (back) platform, requiring passengers transferring or changing direction to pay again. Lane 3's platforms are outside the paid area.

Lane 3	← Mikrotrans departures		← Mikrotrans arrivals
Island platform, boarding is on the right side of the platform		Crossing linkway	Island platform, doors open on the left or right
Lane 2	← (Cililitan)	Crossing linkway	Out of service
Lane 1	← (Cawang Cililitan) towards Tanjung Priok	Crossing linkway	← Arrivals
Side platform, doors open on the left		Crossing linkway	Side platform, doors open on the left

== Non-BRT bus services ==
Type	Route	Destination	Notes
Inner city feeder		Kampung Rambutan—Blok M	Outside the station
Inner city feeder		Cililitan—Blok M	Outside the station
Mikrotrans Jak Lingko	JAK 16	Cililitan—Condet	Inside the station (Lane 3)
Mikrotrans Jak Lingko	JAK 21	Cililitan—Dwikora	Inside the station (Lane 3)
Mikrotrans Jak Lingko	JAK 36	Cilangkap—Cililitan	Inside the station (Lane 3)
Mikrotrans Jak Lingko	JAK 37	Cililitan—Condet via Kayu Manis	Inside the station (Lane 3)
Mikrotrans Jak Lingko	JAK 43B	Tongtek—Cililitan	Inside the station (Lane 3)
Mikrotrans Jak Lingko	JAK 75	Kampung Pulo—Halim via Cililitan	Inside the station (Lane 3)

== Places nearby ==
- Indonesian Army Medical Centre
- Sasana Wira Sakti Building

== Gallery ==
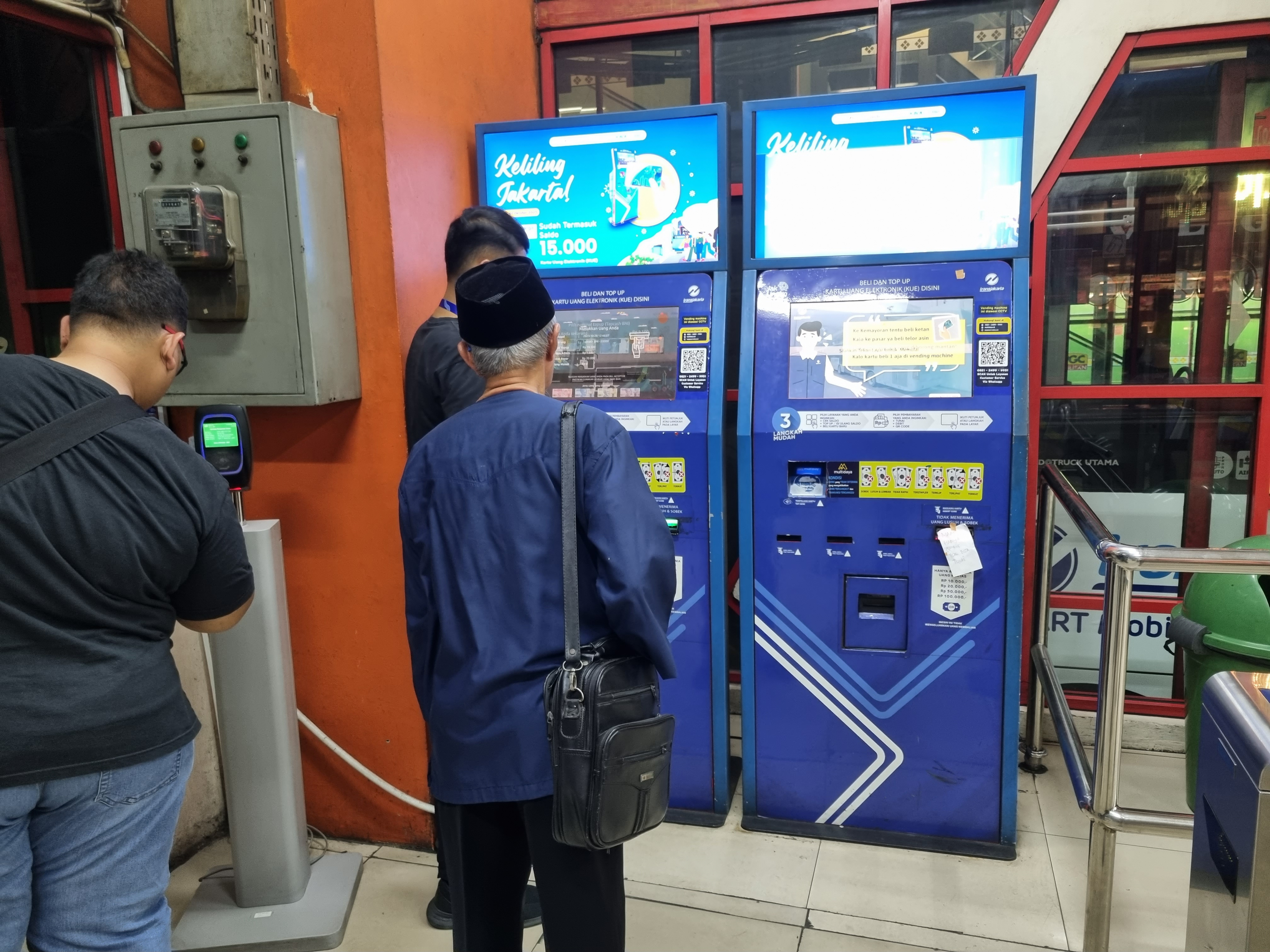
Ticket vending machines

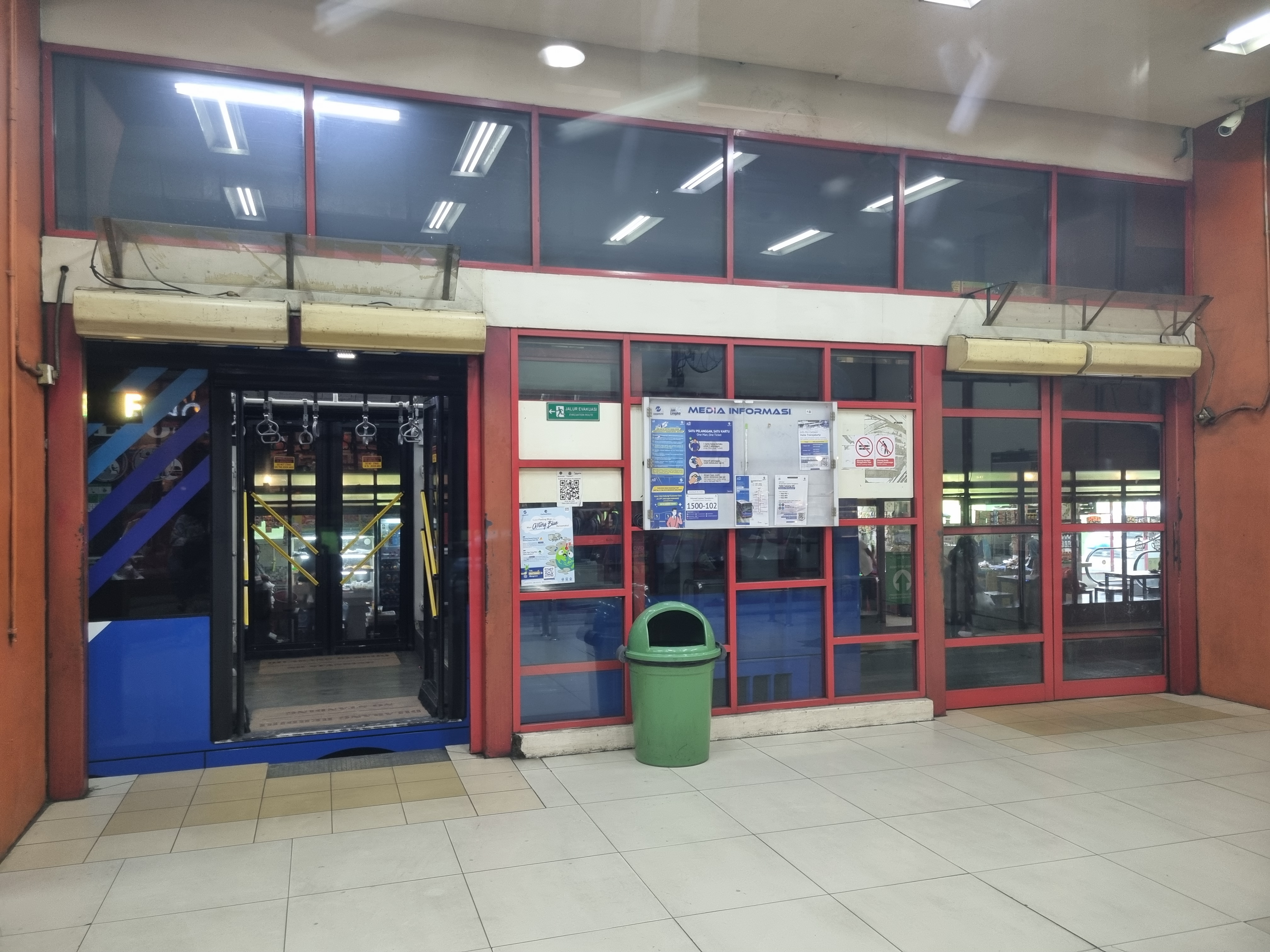
Bus bays B and C deactivated and repurposed for photo booths

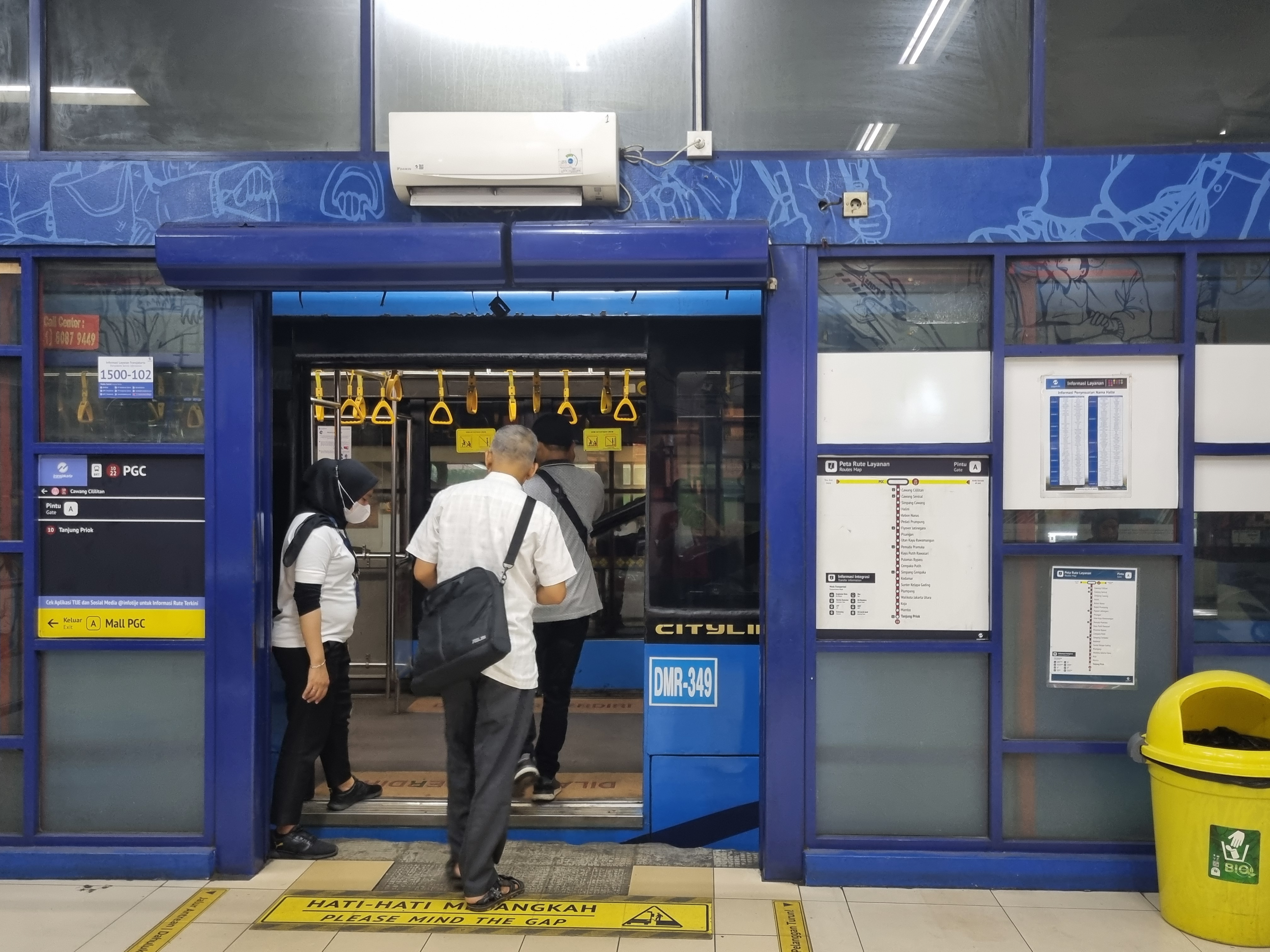
Bus bay A used for boarding

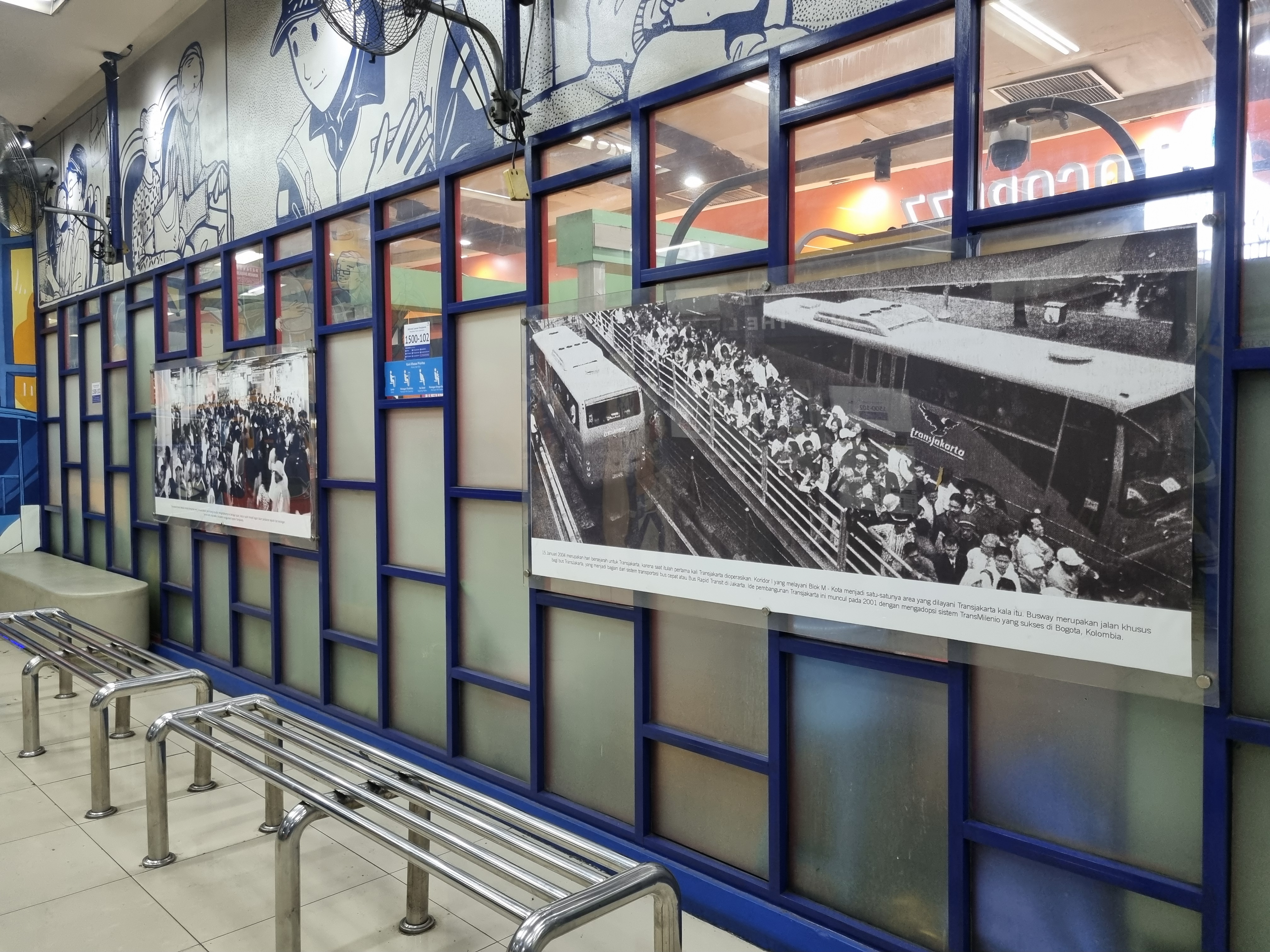
Transjakarta history gallery, featuring a photograph of the inauguration of the system at Gelora Bung Karno (now Senayan Bank Jakarta) station on 15 January 2004

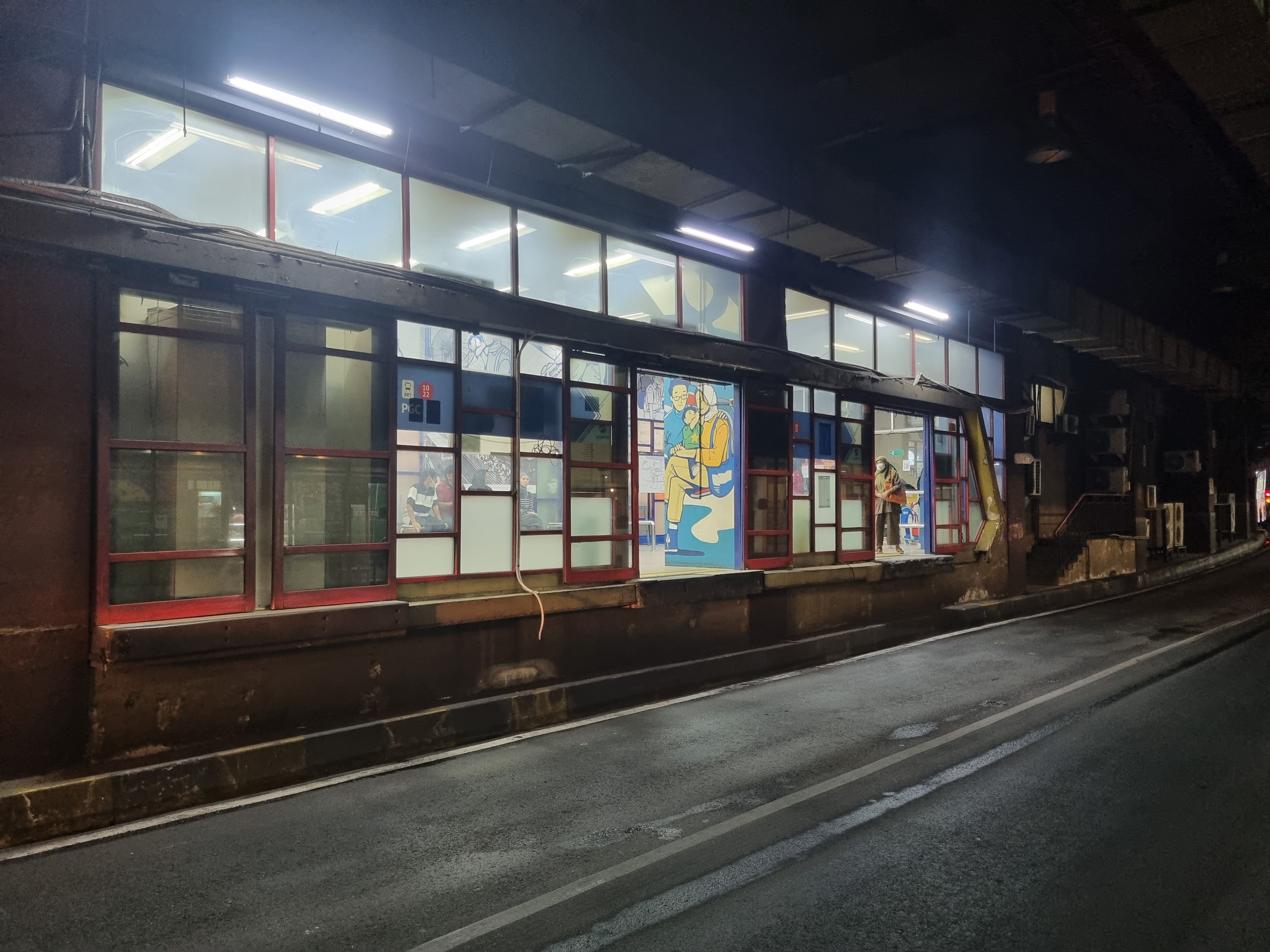
Corridor 10's departure platform

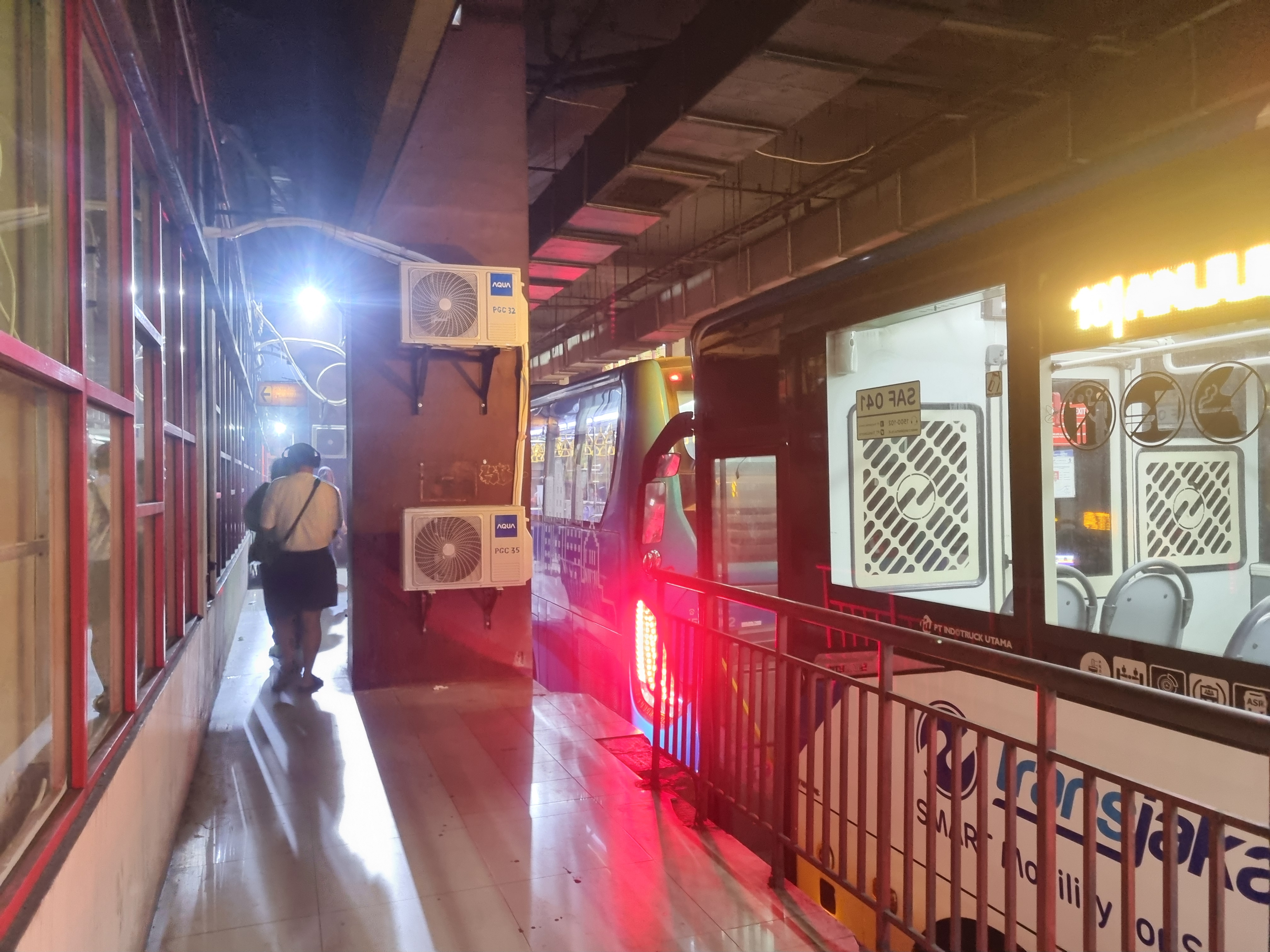
Corridor 10's arrival platform

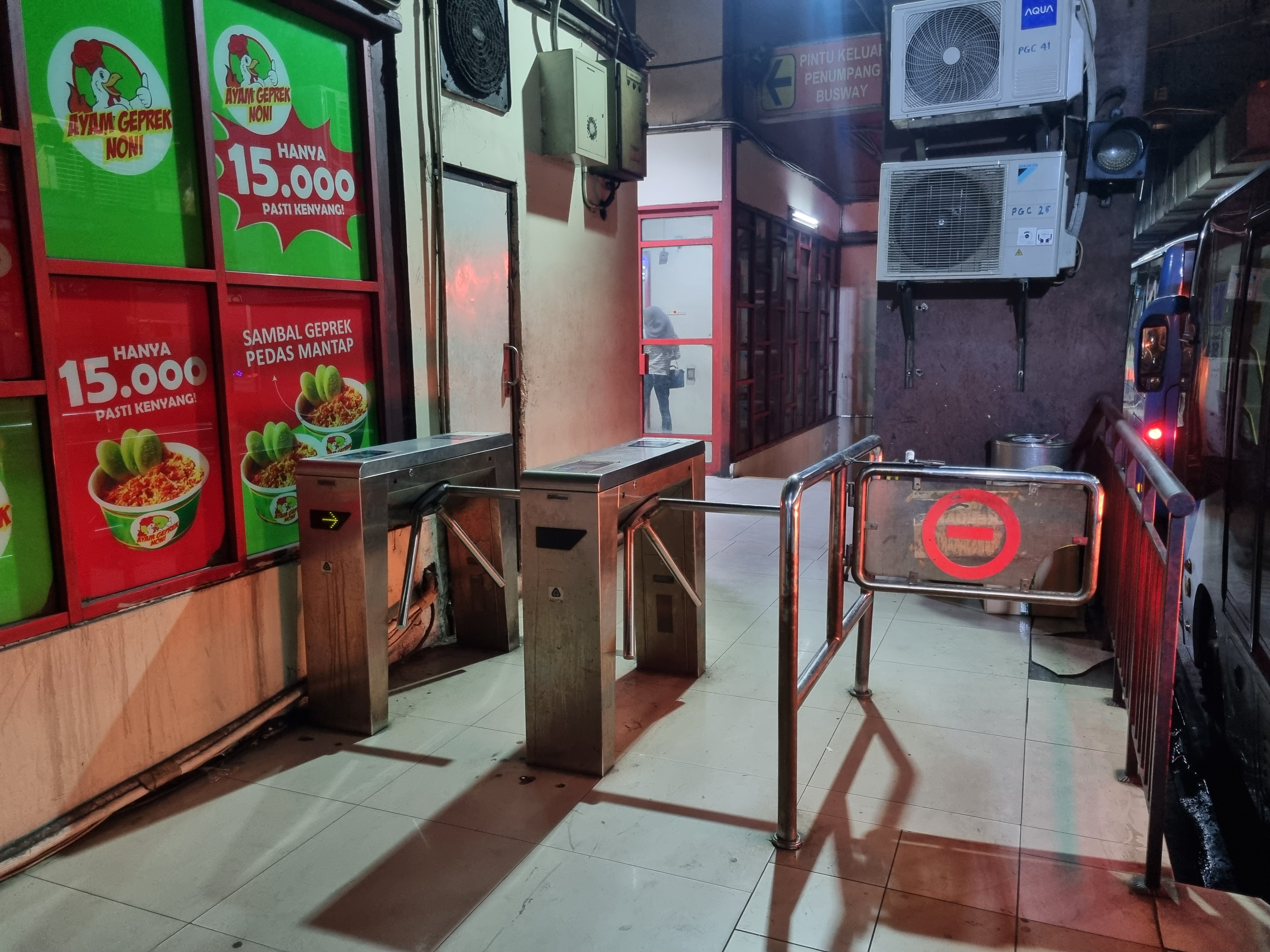
Corridor 10's arrival platform faregates

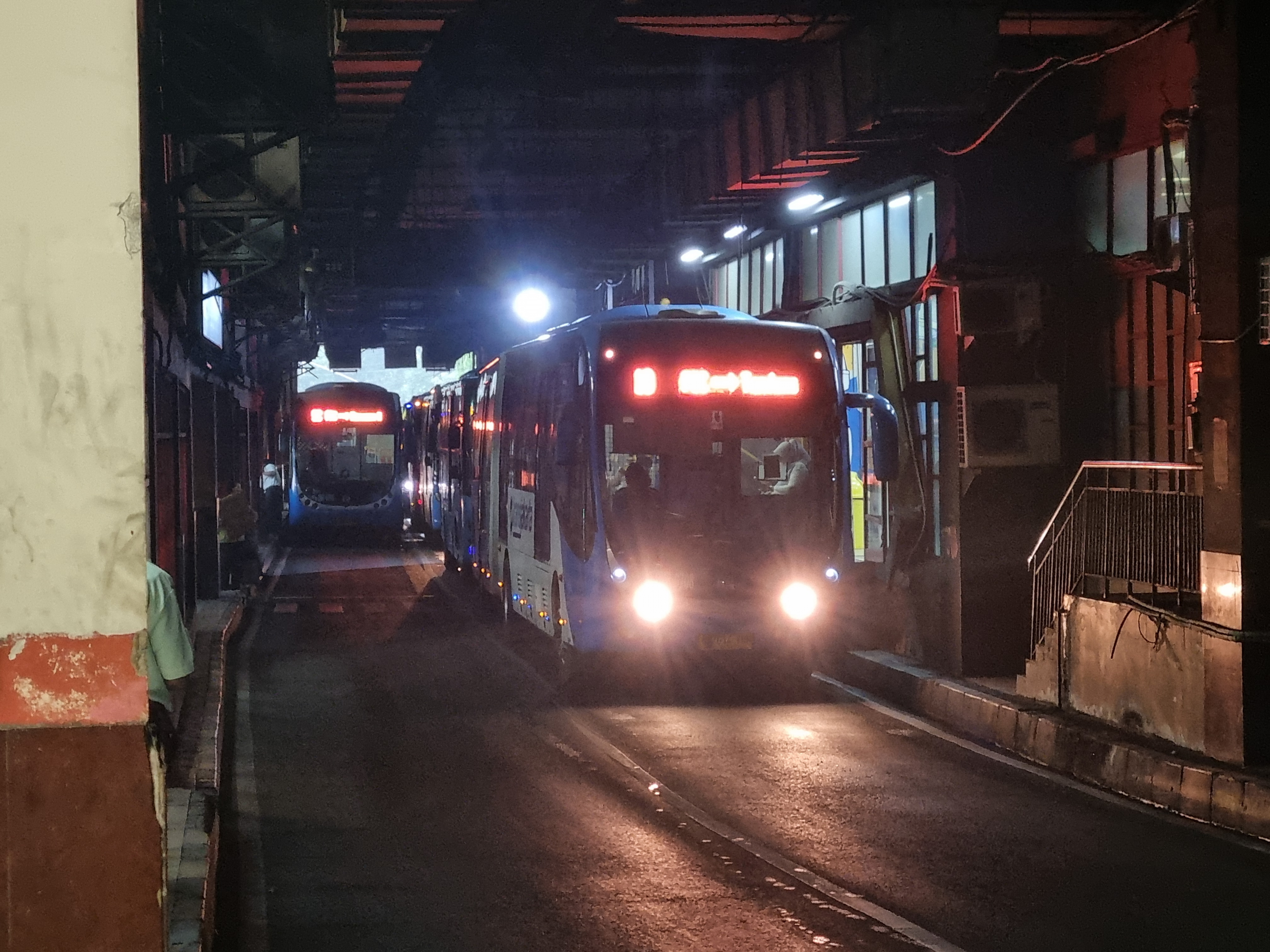
Corridor 10 buses bound for Tanjung Priok waiting to depart

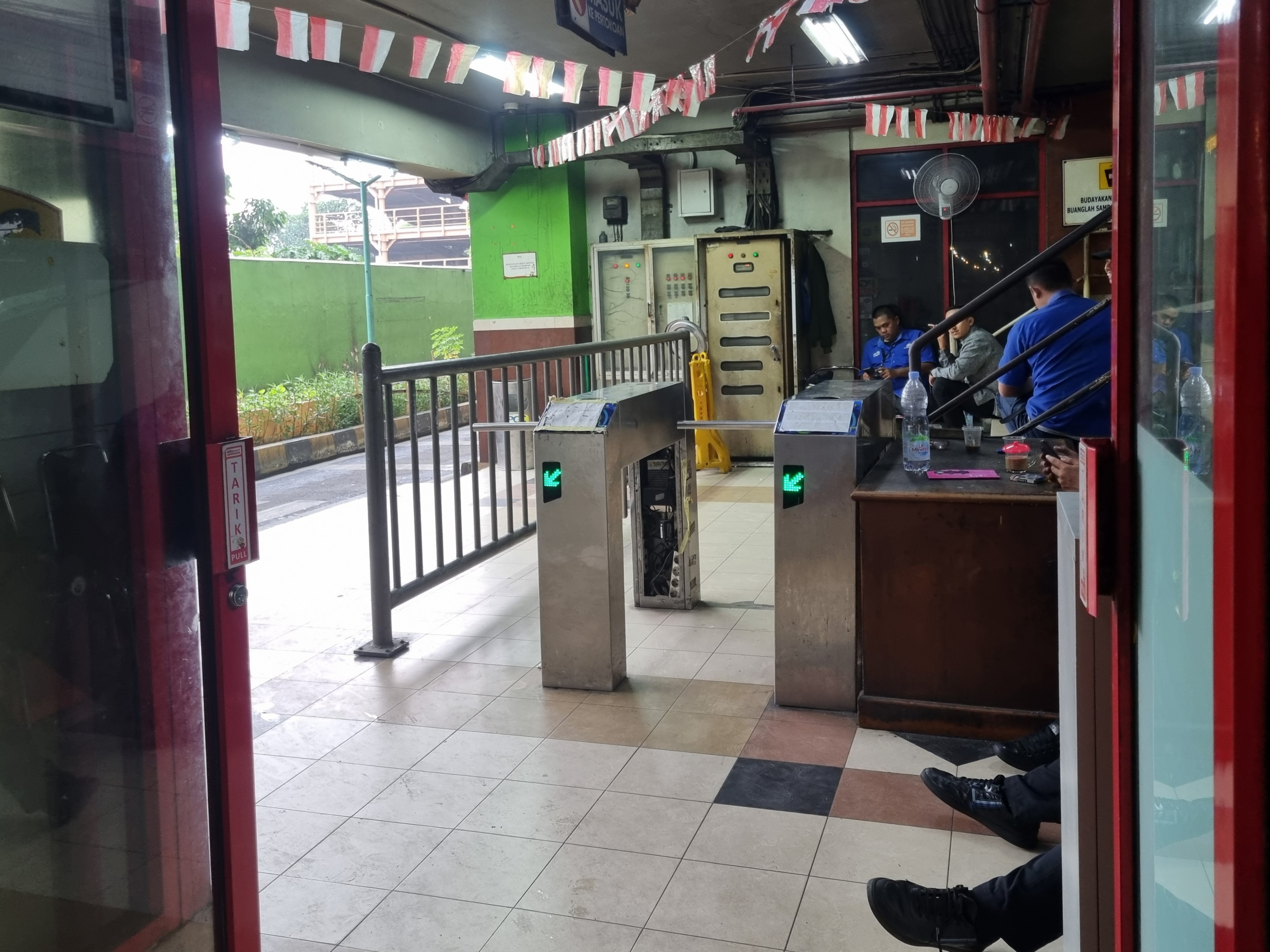
Lane 2's arrival platform faregates

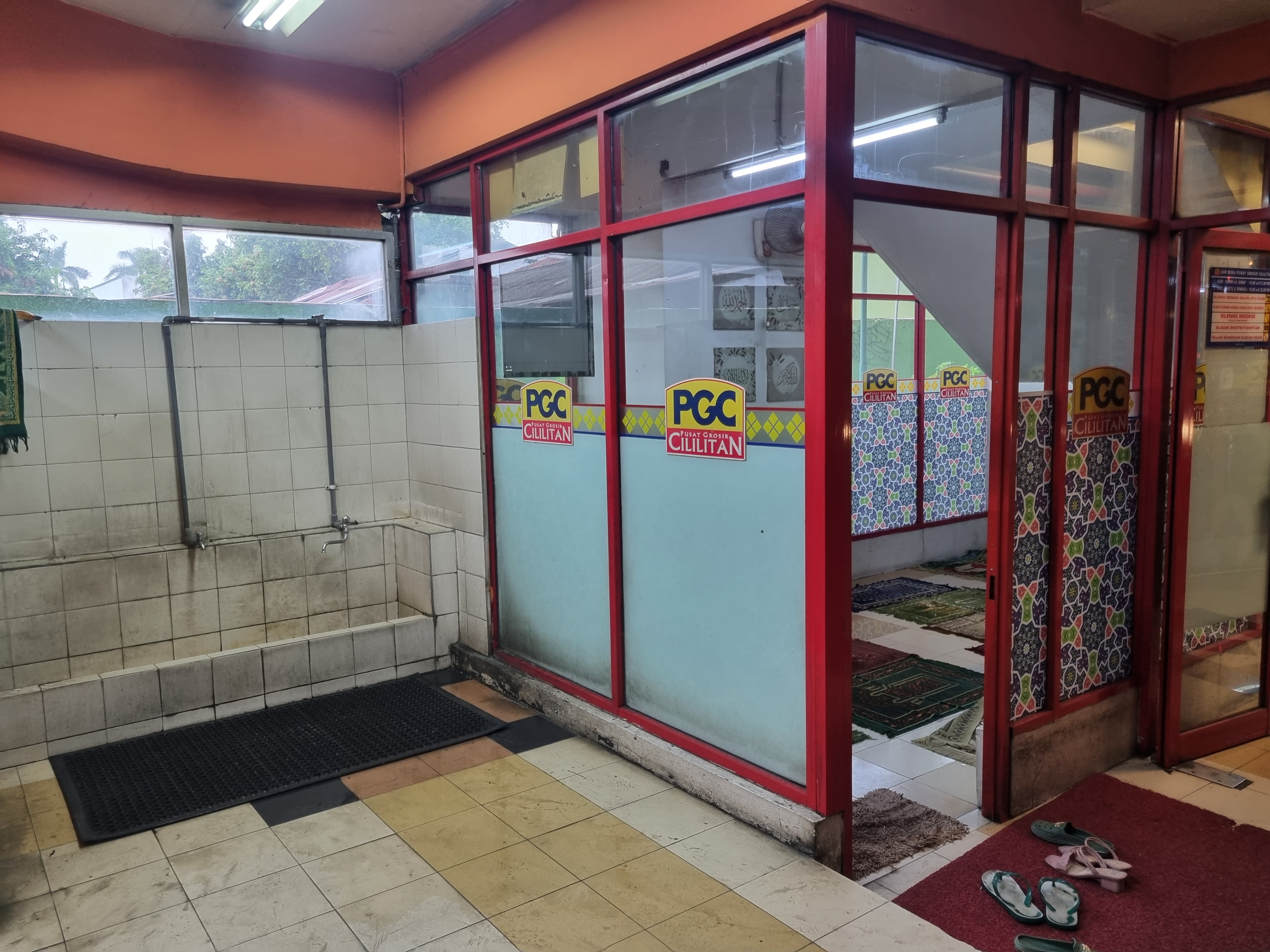
Praying room

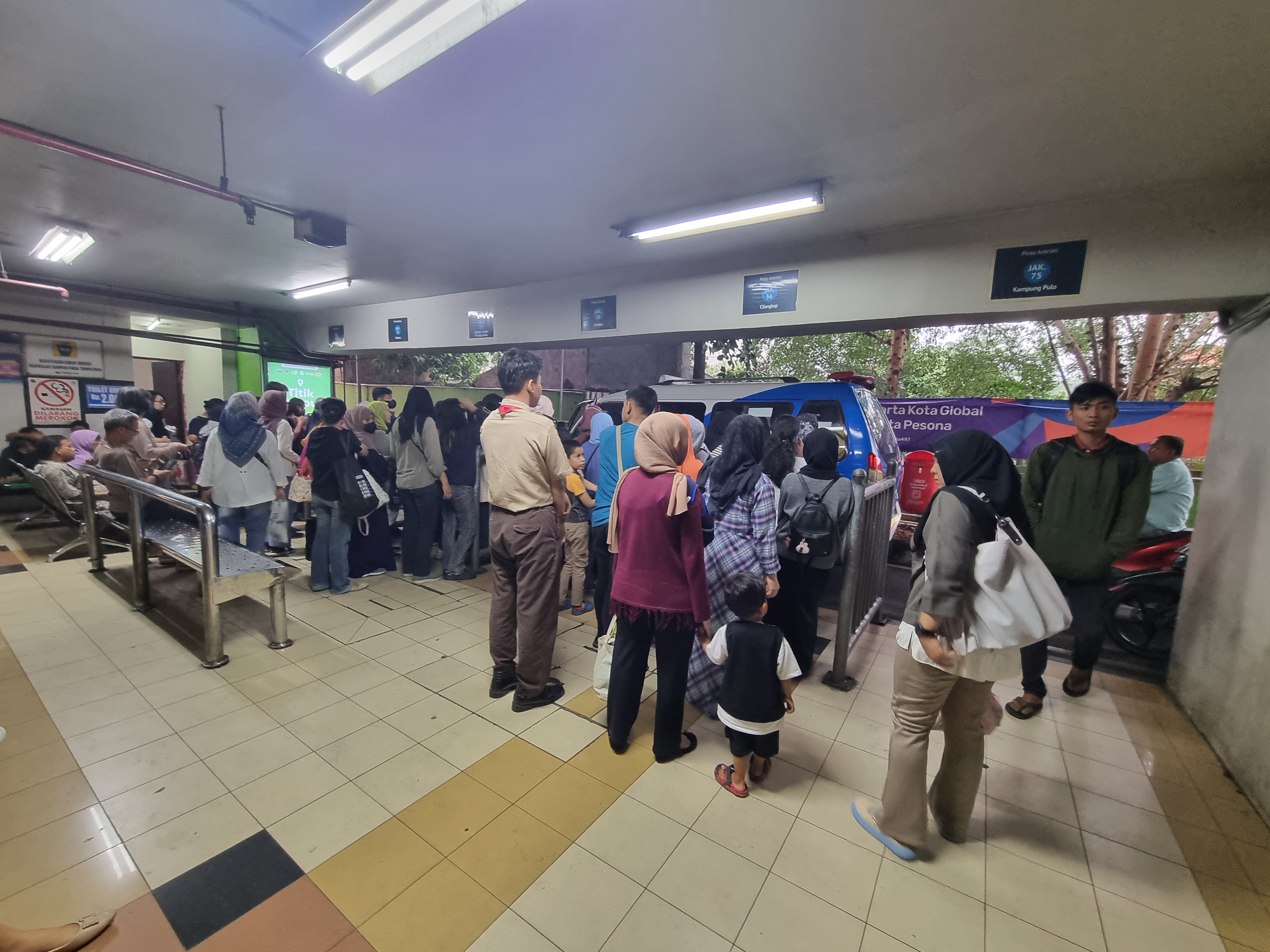
A dedicated platform for microbus-based Mikrotrans feeder routes

== See also ==
- Cililitan (Transjakarta)
