= University Grants Commission =

University Grants Commission may refer to:

- University Grants Commission of Bangladesh
- University Grants Commission (India)
- University Grants Commission (Nepal)
- University Grants Commission (Sri Lanka)

== See also ==
- University Grants Committee (disambiguation)
- Higher Education Commission (disambiguation)
