= UGC =

UGC may refer to:

== Organisations ==
- Canadian Geophysical Union, official abbreviation in French (Union géophysique canadienne)
- UGC (cinema operator), a European cinema chain, formerly Union Générale Cinématographique
- UGC Fox Distribution, a former French-American film production company formed in 1995
- Union Graduate College, Schenectady, New York
- United Grain Company, a Russian grain trading company based in Moscow
- University Grants Commission (disambiguation)
- University Grants Committee (disambiguation)
- UnitedGlobalCom, former name of the cable TV operator Liberty Global
- UnderGround Crips, an African American street gang mainly from Los Angeles, California

== Science and technology ==
- Universal gravitational constant G, in physics
- Uppsala General Catalogue, an astronomical catalogue of galaxies
- UGC, a codon for cysteine
- Unique games conjecture, a conjecture in computational complexity

== Other ==
- User-generated content, media content made by the general public
- Urine Good Company, a fictional corporation in the musical Urinetown
- Urgench International Airport, by IATA code
