= NGC =

NGC may refer to:

== Companies ==
- NGC Corporation, the name of US electric company Dynegy, Inc. from 1995 to 1998
- National Gas Company of Trinidad and Tobago, a state-owned natural gas company in Trinidad and Tobago
- National Grid plc, a former name of National Grid Electricity Transmission plc, the operator of the British electricity transmission system
- Northrop Grumman Corporation, an aerospace and defense conglomerate formed from the merger of Northrop Corporation and Grumman Corporation in 1994
- Numismatic Guaranty Company, a coin certification company in the United States
- National Garden Clubs, headquartered in St. Louis, Missouri
- Network General Corporation, a defunct networking hardware company

== Other uses ==
- National Gallery of Canada, an art gallery founded in 1880 in Ottawa, Canada
- National Games of China, the national multi-sport event of China
- National Geographic (American TV channel), a documentary and reality television channel established in the United States in 2001 formerly called National Geographic Channel
- National Government of Cambodia, the name of the Coalition Government of Democratic Kampuchea from 1990
- National Grand Coalition, political party in Sierra Leone
- Native Girls Code, a US non-profit organisation that teaches computer programming and indigenous knowledge to Native American girls
- Nevada Gaming Commission, a regulator of gaming in the U.S. state of Nevada
- New General Catalogue of Nebulae and Clusters of Stars, a catalogue of deep sky objects in astronomy
- New Graduate College, graduate college at Princeton University
- Nintendo GameCube, a 2001 video game console
- NGC Magazine, a Nintendo enthusiast magazine in the United Kingdom
- North German Confederation, a German federal state that succeeded the German Confederation in 1867
- Carmiooro NGC, a professional cycling team first registered in 2008
- National Glass Centre, a glass-making workshop in North East England, since converted into a visitor attraction at the University of Sunderland
- NVIDIA GPU Cloud, see Yandex Cloud § Structure
- National Green Corps, a programme of the Ministry of Environment and Forests, India
- Next Generation Core, of 5G technology

== See also ==
- Non-celiac gluten sensitivity (NGCS)
- Natural gas compressor station (NGCS)
