= NGC 7836 =

Galaxy in the constellation Andromeda

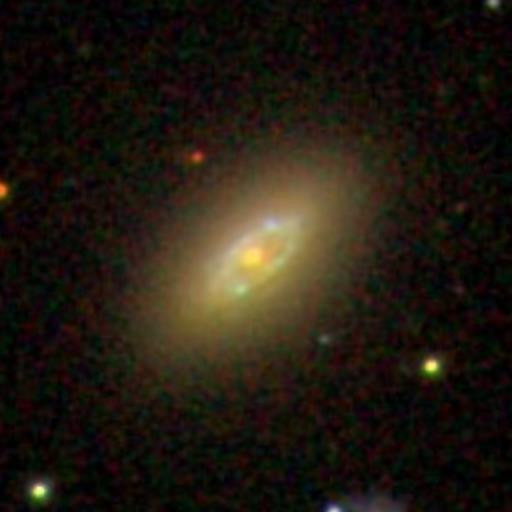
- SDSS image of NGC 7836

Observation data (J2000 epoch)
- Constellation: Andromeda
- Right ascension: 00^{h} 08^{m} 01.6^{s}
- Declination: 33° 04′ 15″
- Redshift: 0.016358
- Heliocentric radial velocity: 4,904 km/s
- Distance: 260 Mly (80 Mpc)
- Apparent magnitude (V): 14.4

Characteristics
- Type: Irr?, Sb
- Size: ~83,000 ly (25.5 kpc) (estimated)
- Apparent size (V): 0.9′ × 0.5′

Other designations
- CGCG 498-79, 499-51, KUG 0005+327, Mrk 336, NPM1G +32.0005, IRAS 00054+3247, NGC 7836, UGC 65, PGC 608

NGC 7836 is an irregular spiral galaxy located about 260 million light-years away in the constellation Andromeda. It is part of the Perseus–Pisces Supercluster. This galaxy was discovered by American astronomer Lewis Swift on September 20, 1885. It has an apparent visual magnitude of 14.4 and spans an angular size of 0.9′ × 0.5′.

NGC 7836 is a member of the NGC 7831 Group (also known as LGG 1), which contains at least 18 galaxies.

== See also ==
- List of NGC objects (7001–7840)
