= Cawang Sentral (Transjakarta) =

Bus rapid transit station in Jakarta, Indonesia

7 09 9 03 10 20 Cawang Sentral
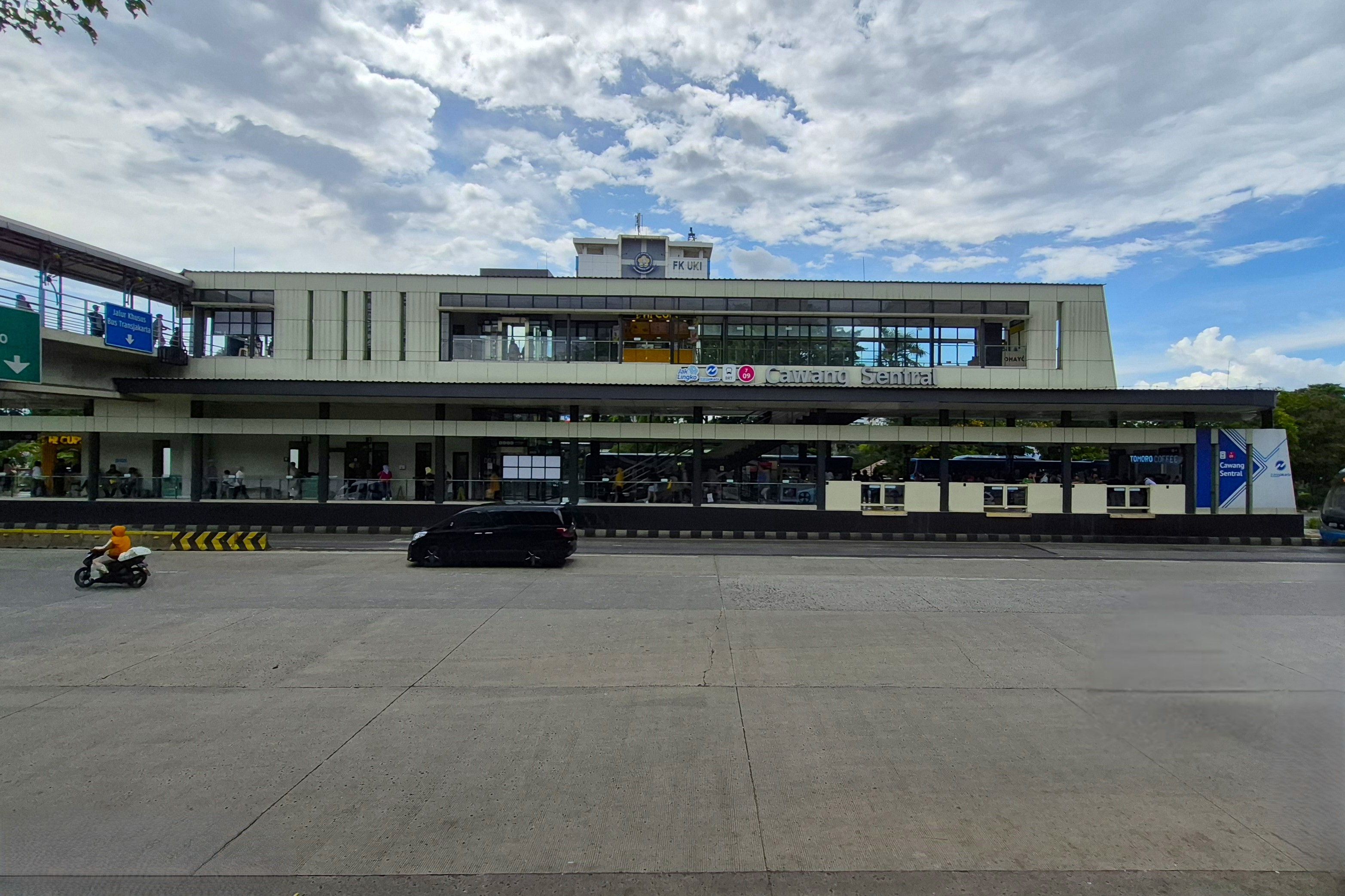

General information
- Location: Mayor Jenderal Sutoyo Street, Cawang, Kramat Jati, East Jakarta, Jakarta, Indonesia
- Coordinates: 6.25035°S 106.87359°E
- System: Transjakarta bus rapid transit station
- Owner: Transjakarta
- Operator: Transjakarta
- Lines: List of Transjakarta corridors#Cross-corridor routes List of TransJakarta corridors#Corridor 7 List of TransJakarta corridors#Corridor 9 List of TransJakarta corridors#Cross-corridor routes List of TransJakarta corridors#Corridor 10

Construction
- Structure type: At-grade
- Cycle facilities: No

Other information
- Status: In service

History
- Opened: 27 January 2007
- Rebuilt: 2023
- Former names: Cawang UKI

Services
Preceding		Following
Cawang towards Juanda	Corridor 5 Route 5C	Cawang Cililitan towards Cililitan
Cawang Cililitan towards Kampung Rambutan	Corridor 7	Cawang towards Kampung Melayu
Makasar towards Pinang Ranti	Corridor 9	Cawang towards Pluit
Makasar towards Pinang Ranti	Corridor 9 Route 9C	Cawang towards Bundaran Senayan
Makasar towards Pinang Ranti	Corridor 9 Route 9N Only available on weekends	Simpang Cawang Terminus
Simpang Cawang towards Tanjung Priok	Corridor 10	Cawang Cililitan towards PGC
Location

Cawang Sentral (formerly Cawang UKI) is a Transjakarta bus rapid transit station located at Mayjen Sutoyo Street in East Jakarta, Indonesia. It is an interchange station between corridors 7, 9, and 10, and has been designated as one of the central stations of the BRT system. The station is located adjacent with the Christian University of Indonesia (UKI) on the east, hence its former name.

Because of the large mobility of passengers and its designation as a central station, this station was closed for a major revitalization on 1 June 2023. Transjakarta provided the 9N (Pinang Ranti–Cawang Sutoyo, still operating) and 10ST (PGC–BNN, closed in September 2023) shuttle routes for passengers who wanted to transit between corridor 9 and 10. On 17 November, during the revitalization progress, Transjakarta announced that the then-named Cawang UKI BRT station would be renamed to Cawang Sentral, as the station served 12 different routes BRT and non-BRT feeder routes. At the same day, the revitalization progress had reached about 50%.

On 24 December 2023, the station was reopened to the public with its new name Cawang Sentral.

== Building and layout ==
As a central station that serves three main corridors, Cawang Sentral BRT station now has two floors: the lower floor as the platform area, and the upper floor as a concourse. The station is also equipped with elevators for priority passengers (disabled, elderlies, etc.) and escalators to ease the passenger flow. The second floor area is built at the north of the station's bridge access.

The building is designed in a semi open-air concept, in order to maximize the usage of natural lighting from the sunlight.

Upper floor	Entrance/exit (via bridge), concourse, and commercial area
Platform floor	West	to Juanda, to Kampung Melayu, to Pluit, to Bundaran Senayan, to Simpang Cawang, and to Tanjung Priok (Cawang/Simpang Cawang) →
Platform floor	Island platform, the platform doors are opened on right side of the direction of travel
Platform floor	East	← (Cawang Cililitan/Makasar) to Cililitan, to PGC, to Kampung Rambutan, and to Pinang Ranti

== Non-BRT bus services ==
Service type	Route	Destination	Notes
Inner city feeder		Cibubur–Cawang Cililitan	Inside the station
Inner city feeder		TMII–Tegal Parang	Inside the station
Inner city feeder		Pondok Kelapa–Cawang Sentral	Inside the station
Inner city feeder		Cawang–Halim HSR Station	Outside the station
Cross-border feeder (Transjabodetabek)		Vida Bekasi–Cawang Sentral via Jatiasih	Inside the station
Cross-border feeder (Transjabodetabek)		Cikarang Jababeka–Cawang Sentral via Grand Wisata Bekasi	Outside the station
Cross-border feeder (Transjabodetabek)		Depok–Cawang Sentral	Outside the station
Mikrotrans Jak Lingko	JAK-20	Cawang Sentral–Lubang Buaya	Outside the station
Mikrotrans Jak Lingko	JAK-75	Kampung Pulo–Halim via Cililitan	Outside the station

== Places nearby ==
- Christian University of Indonesia Campus
  - Christian University of Indonesia Medical Faculty Hospital

== Gallery ==
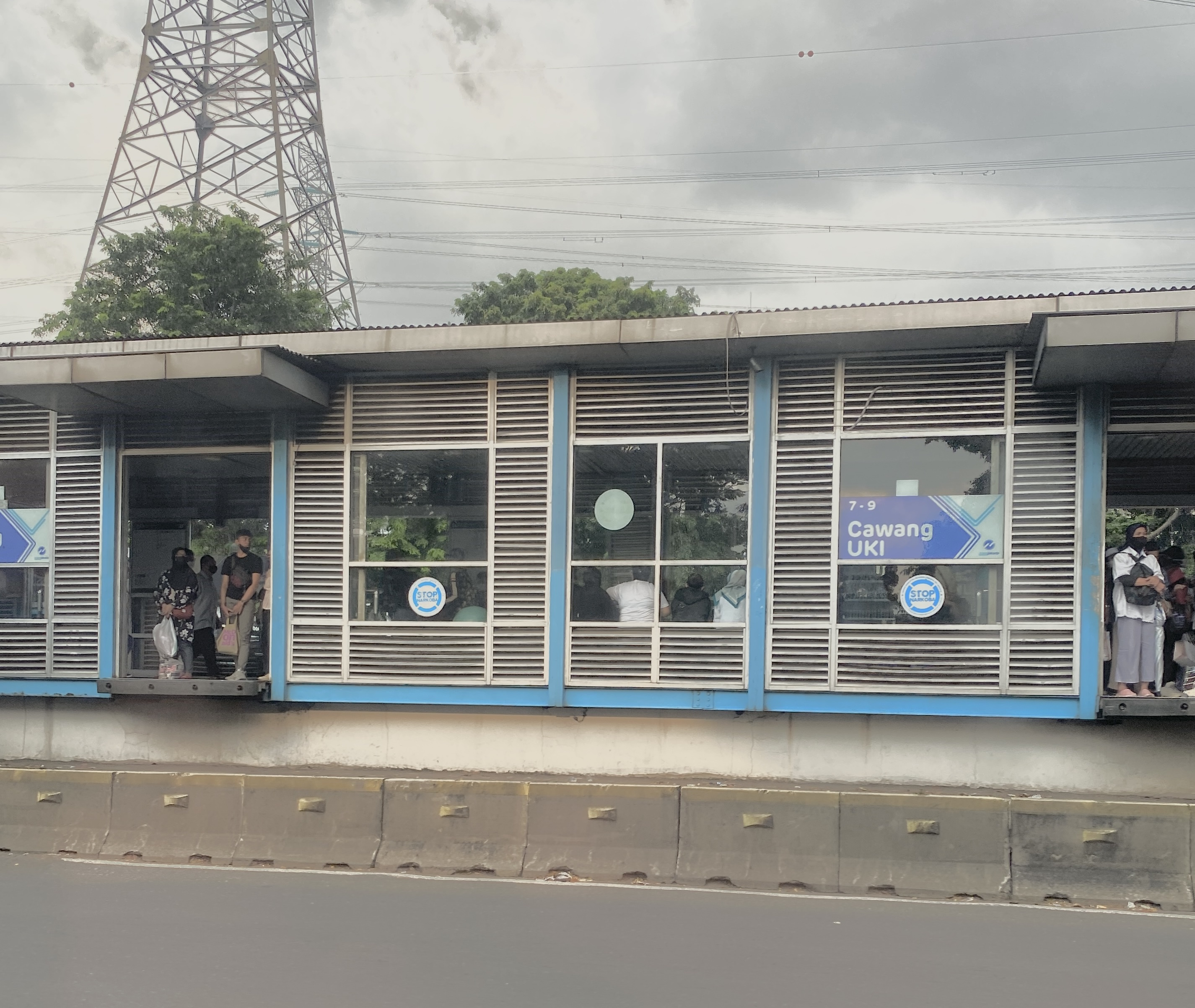
The pre-revitalization building of the station, seen in May 2023

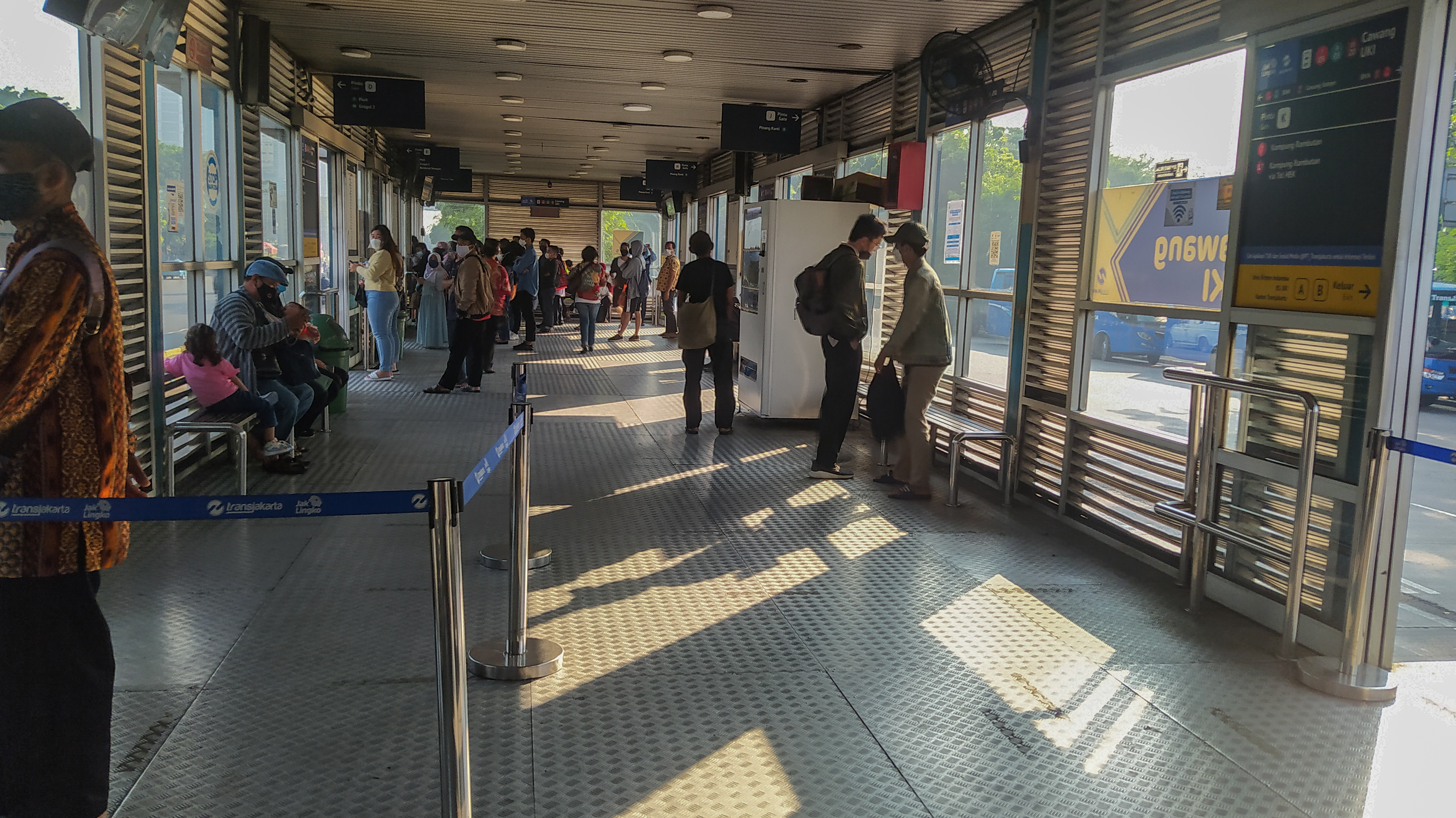
Interior of the old station building, 2022

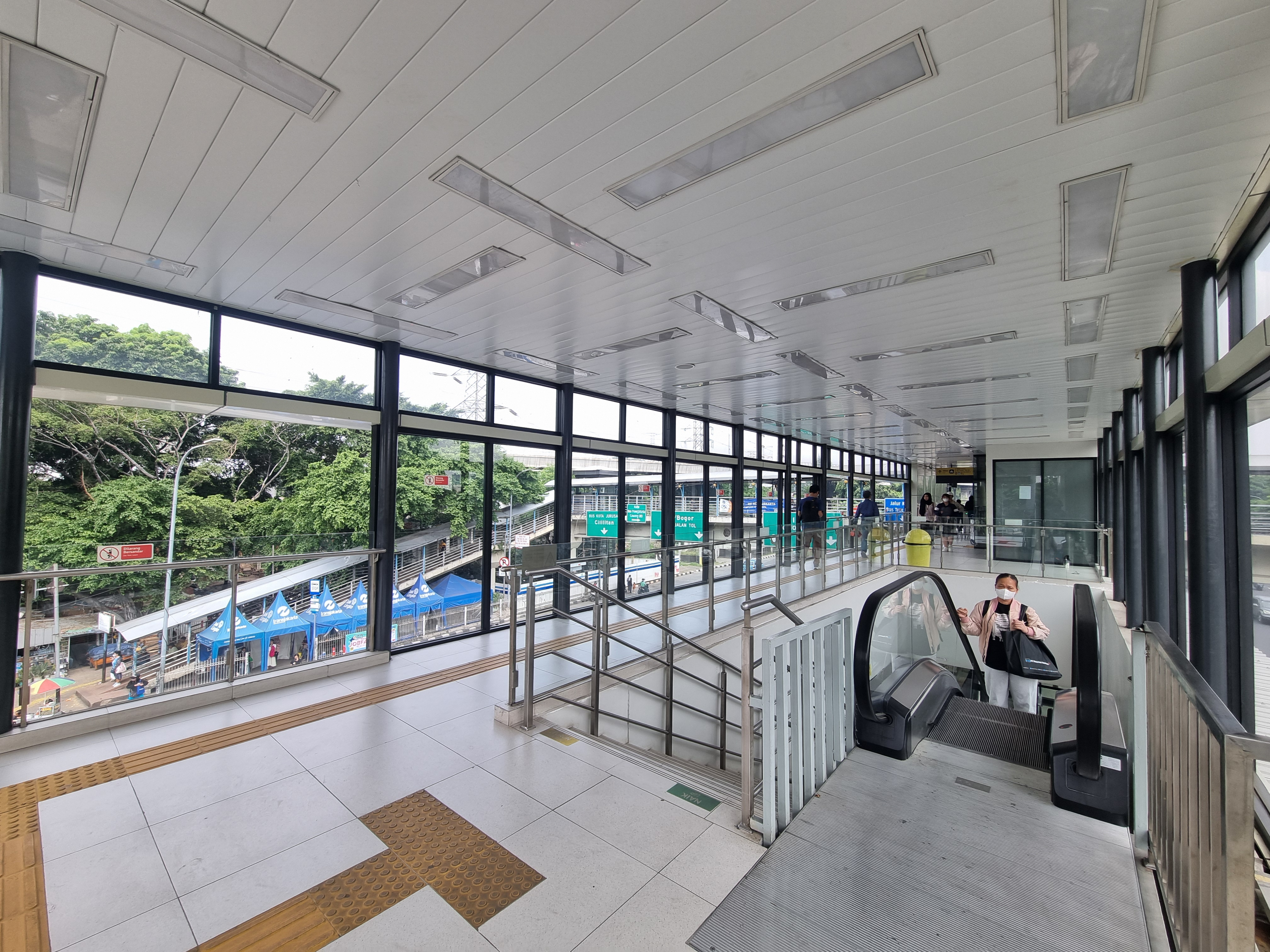
Entrance and concourse area upstairs, 2024

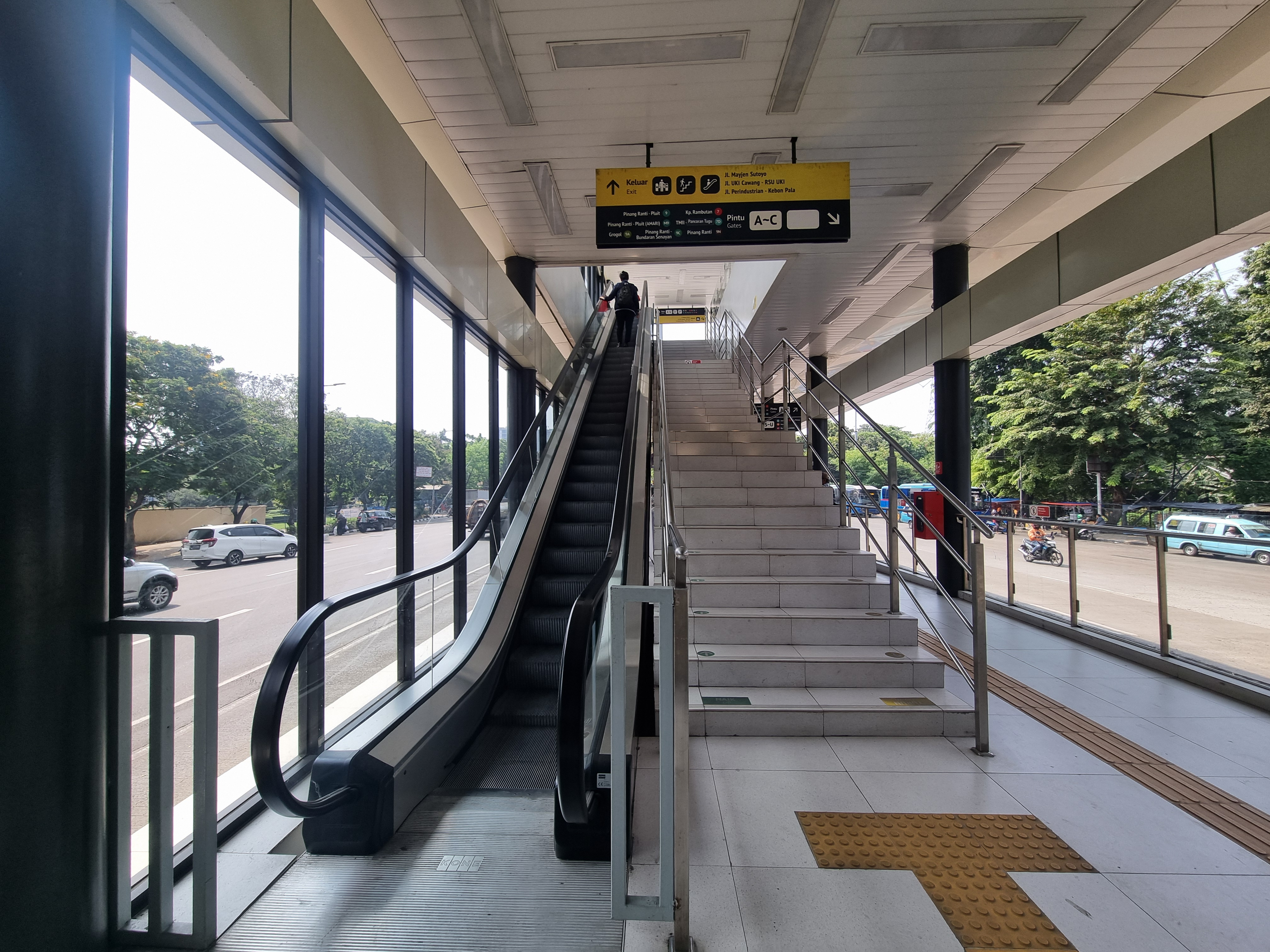
The escalator to access the access the second floor, 2024

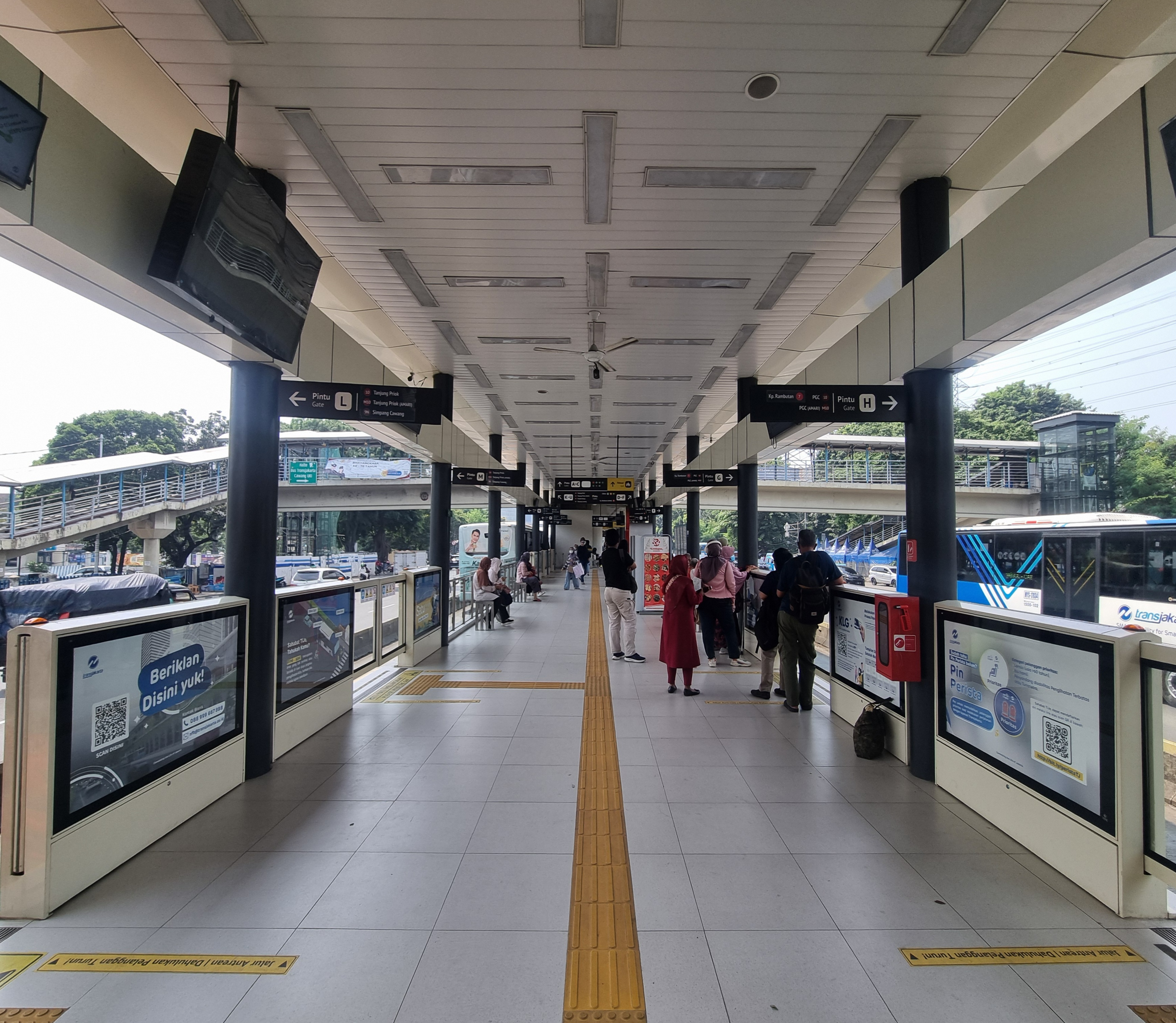
The new platform area, 2024
