= Cawang (Transjakarta) =

Bus rapid transit station in Jakarta, Indonesia

7 09 9 03 Cawang
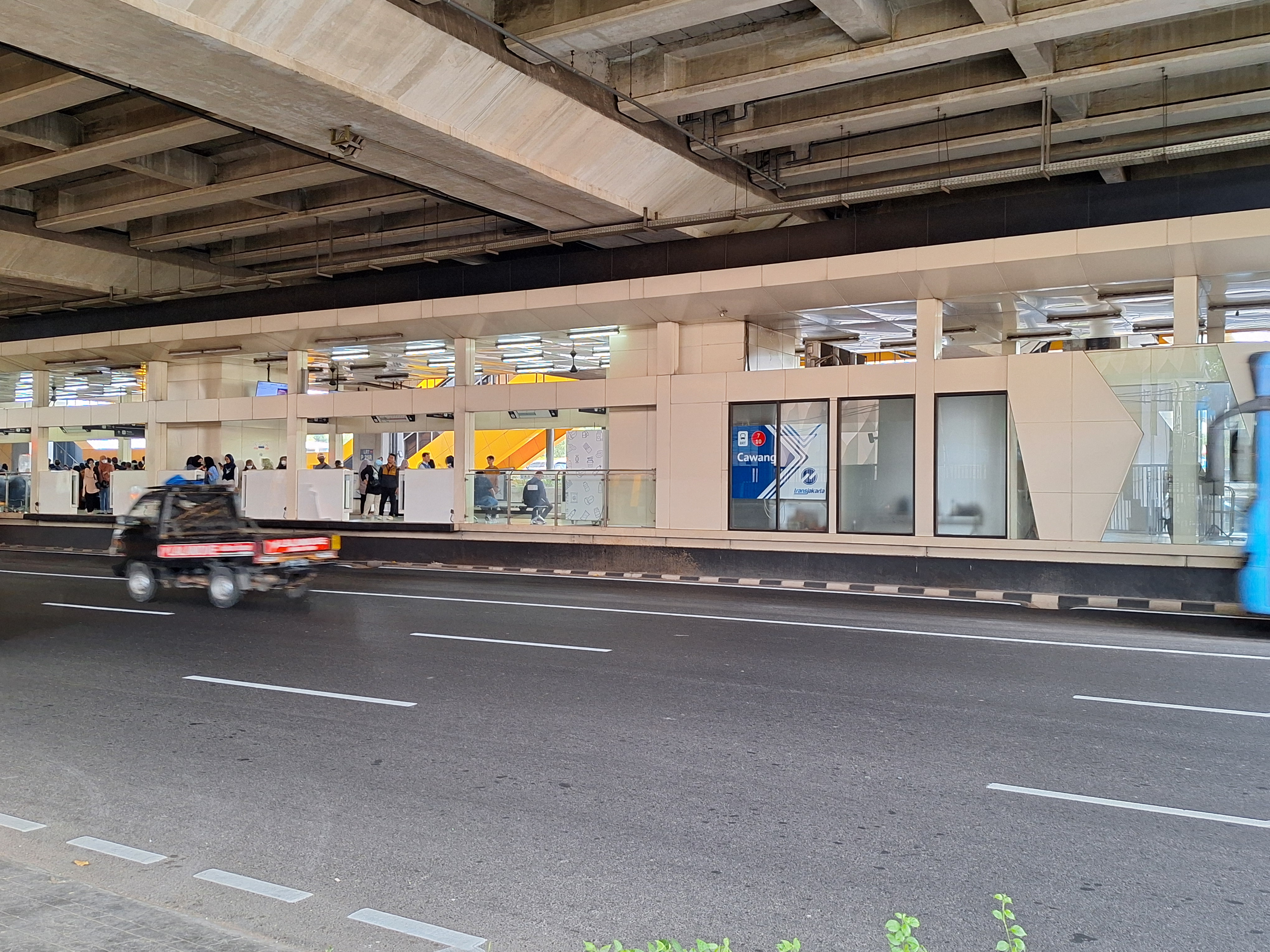
- The new building below the Cawang LRT station

General information
- Other names: Cawang BNN, BNN LRT
- Location: MT Haryono Street, Cawang, Kramat Jati, East Jakarta 13630, Indonesia
- Coordinates: 6.24615°S 106.8721°E
- System: Transjakarta bus rapid transit station
- Owner: Transjakarta
- Operator: Transjakarta
- Lines: List of Transjakarta corridors#Cross-corridor routes List of TransJakarta corridors#Corridor 7 List of TransJakarta corridors#Corridor 9 List of TransJakarta corridors#Cross-corridor routes
- Platforms: Single island platform
- Connections: Cawang

Construction
- Structure type: At-grade

Other information
- Status: In service

History
- Opened: 27 January 2007
- Rebuilt: 2023
- Former names: BNN

Services
Preceding		Following
Cawang Baru towards Juanda	Corridor 5 Route 5C	Cawang Sentral towards Cililitan
Cawang Sentral towards Kampung Rambutan	Corridor 7	Cawang Baru towards Kampung Melayu
Cawang Sentral towards Pinang Ranti	Corridor 9	Ciliwung towards Pluit
Cawang Cililitan towards Cililitan	Corridor 9 Route 9A	Ciliwung towards Grogol Reformasi
Cawang Sentral towards Pinang Ranti	Corridor 9 Route 9C	Ciliwung towards Bundaran Senayan
Location

Cawang (formerly BNN) is a Transjakarta bus rapid transit station located at the eastern end of MT Haryono street in Cawang, Kramat Jati, East Jakarta, Indonesia, which serves as an interchange between corridor 7 and 9. It is located nearby the National Narcotics Board (BNN) headquarters to the southwest (hence its former name) and built below the Cawang LRT station.

== History ==
The station began operational as BNN together with the opening of corridor 7 on 27 January 2007. It originally had two separated side platforms each placed on north and south roadsides. Both were connected by a transfer bridge within paid area, which allowed passengers to change direction without paying again. The buildings each had two platform bays, which were later extended to five.

In May 2018, the original station buildings were demolished to make way for the construction of the Cawang LRT station; they were replaced by temporary buildings located 200 m east of the original site, built in same format of two side platforms situated on the northeast and south. The northeast building was only accessible via a separated bridge, as it stood in the middle of a road fork. The south building was accessible from a street-level entrance on the east and also connected to north side.

The design of the LRT station has already included the new integrated building of BNN BRT station below it. Once the LRT station building was finished, the new BRT station (sometimes referred as BNN LRT) was opened to the public on 24 March 2023. However, the temporary buildings on the east remained operating until 2025, and route 9A (Cililitan–Grogol Reformasi) did not stop at these buildings since the opening of the new west building.

In December 2023, Transjakarta renamed BNN BRT station as Cawang as a part of name neutralization from any government institutions like the nearby BNN, as well as other third-party names, to allow the station to grant a naming right. The northeast and southeast buildings, however, retained the original name to distinguish themself with the new one on the west, though were no longer mentioned in any Transjakarta route maps sometime later.

On 1 March 2025, the temporary northeast and southeast building of the station ceased operating, concentrating all services at the west building. They were abandoned for eight months, and were demolished in early November 2025.

== Building and layout ==
The current building of Cawang BRT station has already designed to be integrated with the Cawang LRT station. It is now placed on the road median in a form of island platform and has 6 platform bays for each direction. New facilities are included such as toilets, nursery rooms and a small praying room (musala). The station is also indirectly connected to Cawang Baru Tengah street across the Jakarta Inner Ring Road to the north, as the LRT station has a connection bridge to the aforementioned street. Elevators are also provided to access both BRT and LRT stations.

North	to Cililitan		to Kampung Rambutan and to Pinang Ranti	(Cawang Sentral) ↴
Island platform, the platform doors are opened on right side of the direction of travel
South	← (Cawang Baru/Ciliwung)	to Juanda and to Kampung Melayu	to Pluit, to Grogol Reformasi, and to Bundaran Senayan

== Non-BRT bus services ==
Type	Route	Destination	Notes
Inner city feeder		Pulo Gadung–Kejaksaan Agung	Inside the station
Inner city feeder		TMII–Tegal Parang	Inside the station
Inner city feeder		Cibubur–Pluit	Inside the station
Inner city feeder		Cibubur–Ancol	Inside the station
Inner city feeder		Cawang–Halim railway station	Outside the station
Cross-border feeder (Transjabodetabek)		Summarecon Bekasi–Cawang	Outside the station
Cross-border feeder (Transjabodetabek)		Bekasi Timur–Cawang	Outside the station

== Places nearby ==
- Dr. Mahar Mardjono National Brain Center Hospital
- National Narcotics Board headquarters
- Sentral Cawang Hotel
- Harper Hotel MT Haryono

== Incident ==
On 23 December 2012, the glass wall of the then-named BNN BRT station was damaged by unidentified culprits around 19:35 local time.

== Gallery ==
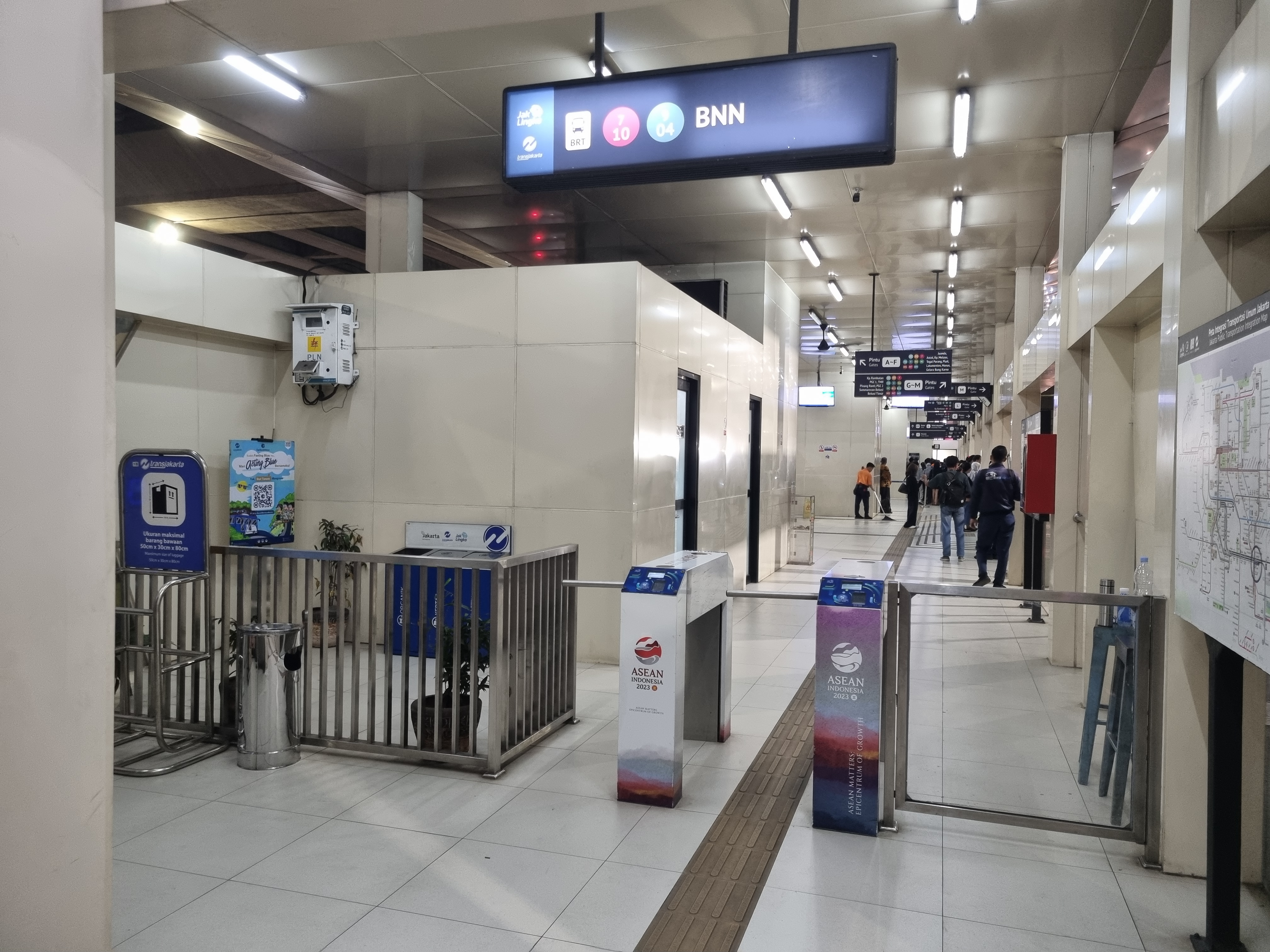
The entrance gate, with the turnstiles wrapped with the 43rd ASEAN Summit of 2023 livery

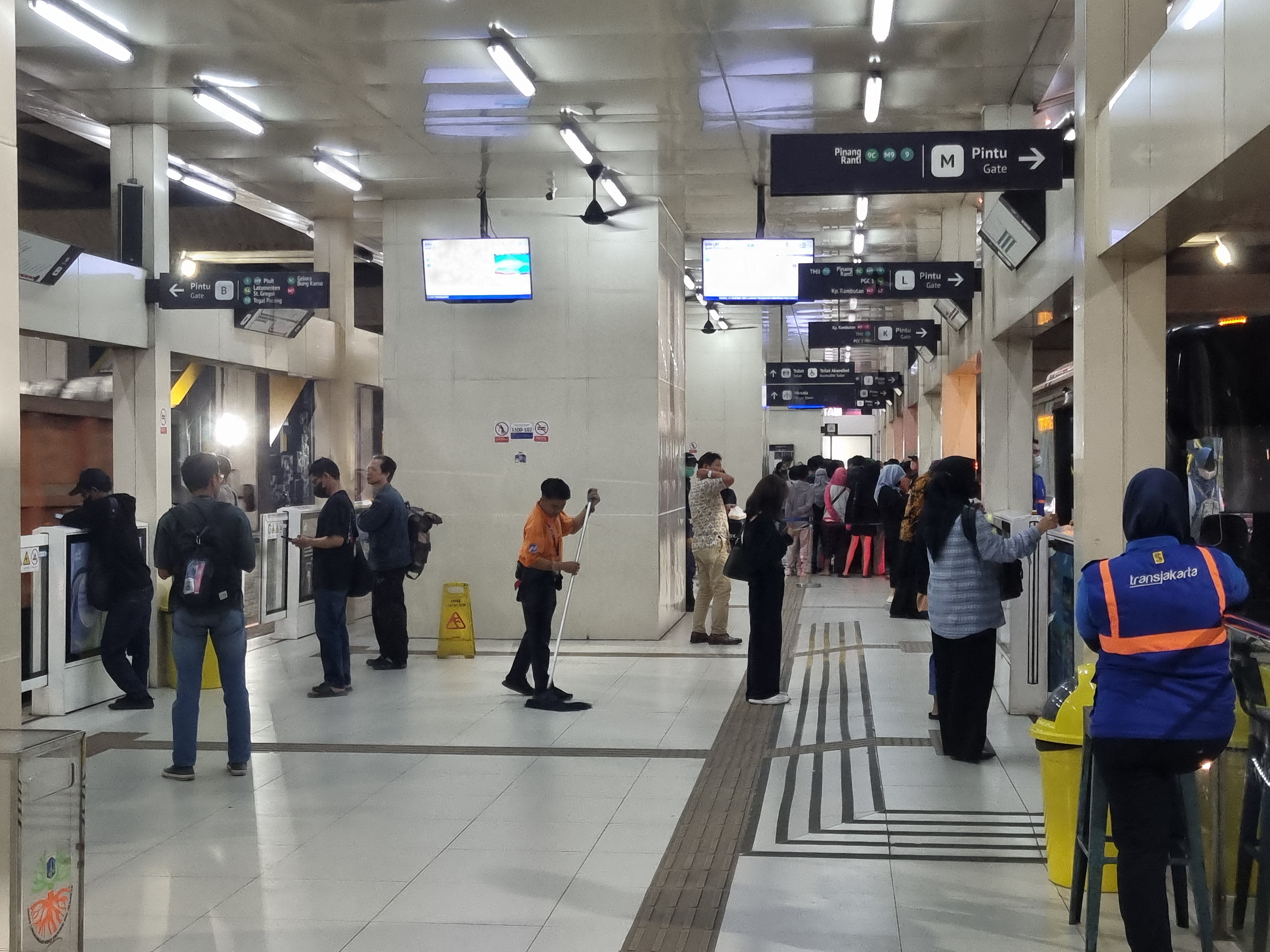
View of the platform area

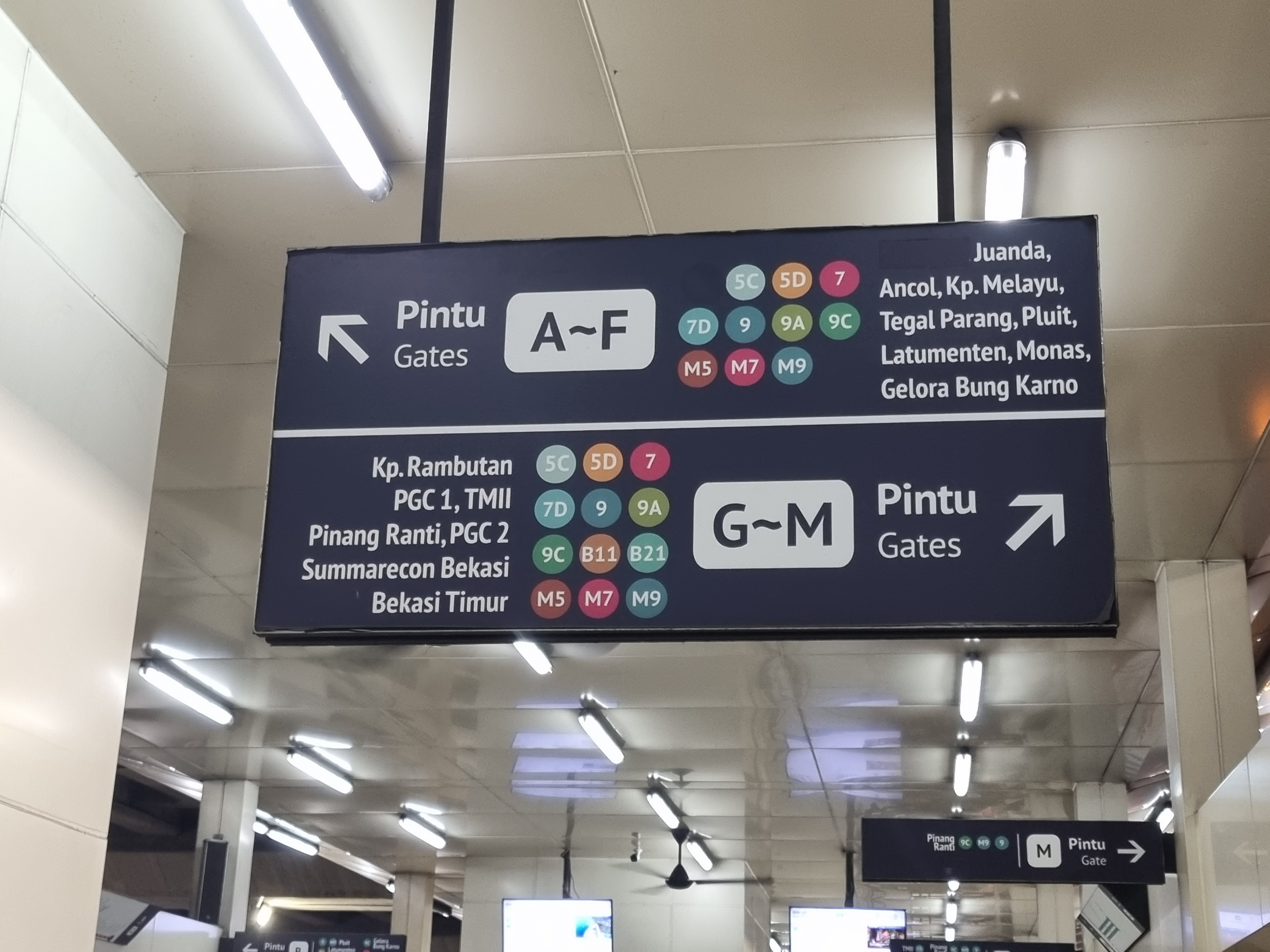
Signage of bus routes inside the building, 2023

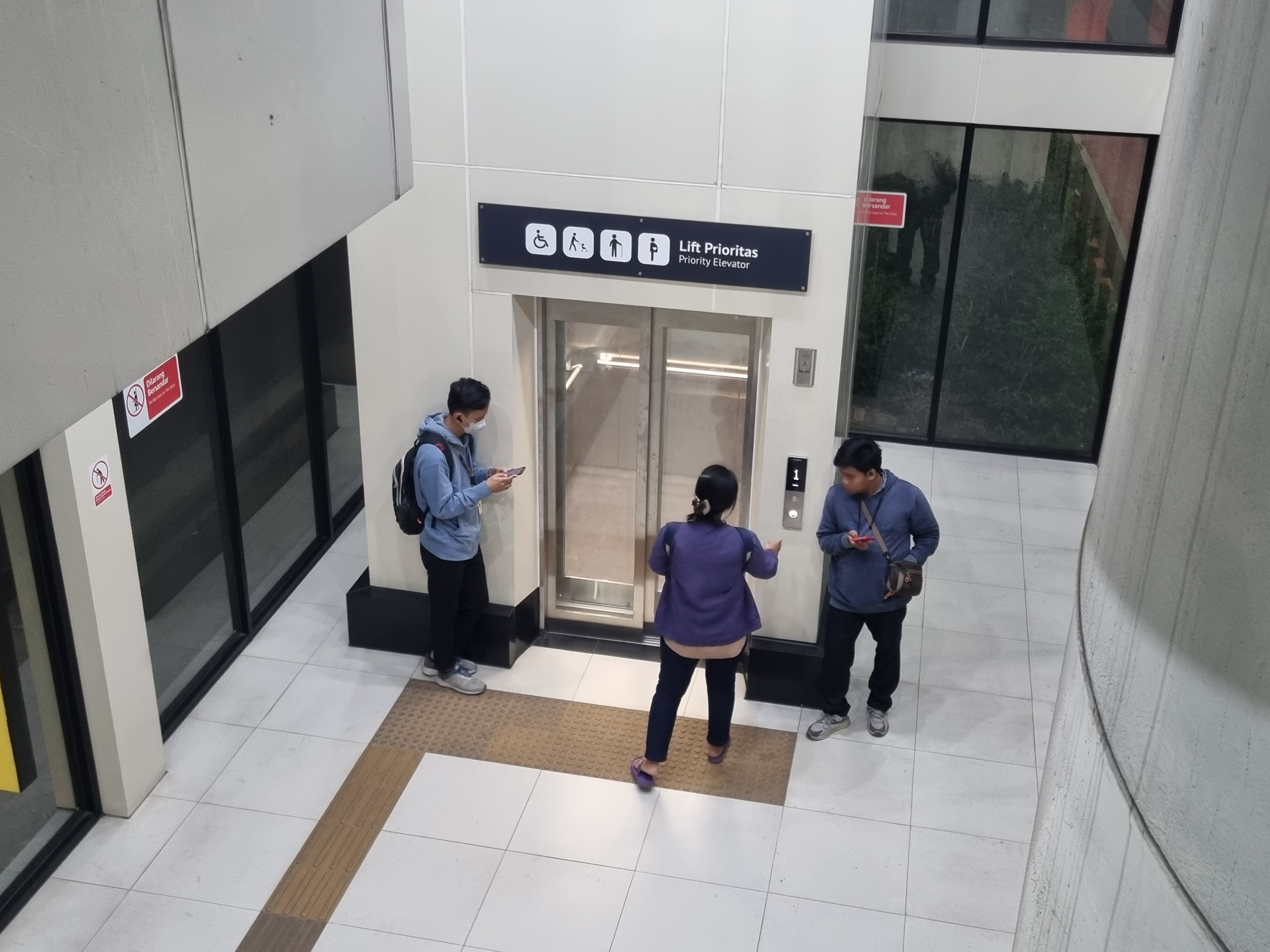
An elevator to access both Cawang BRT station and the LRT station with the same name above it

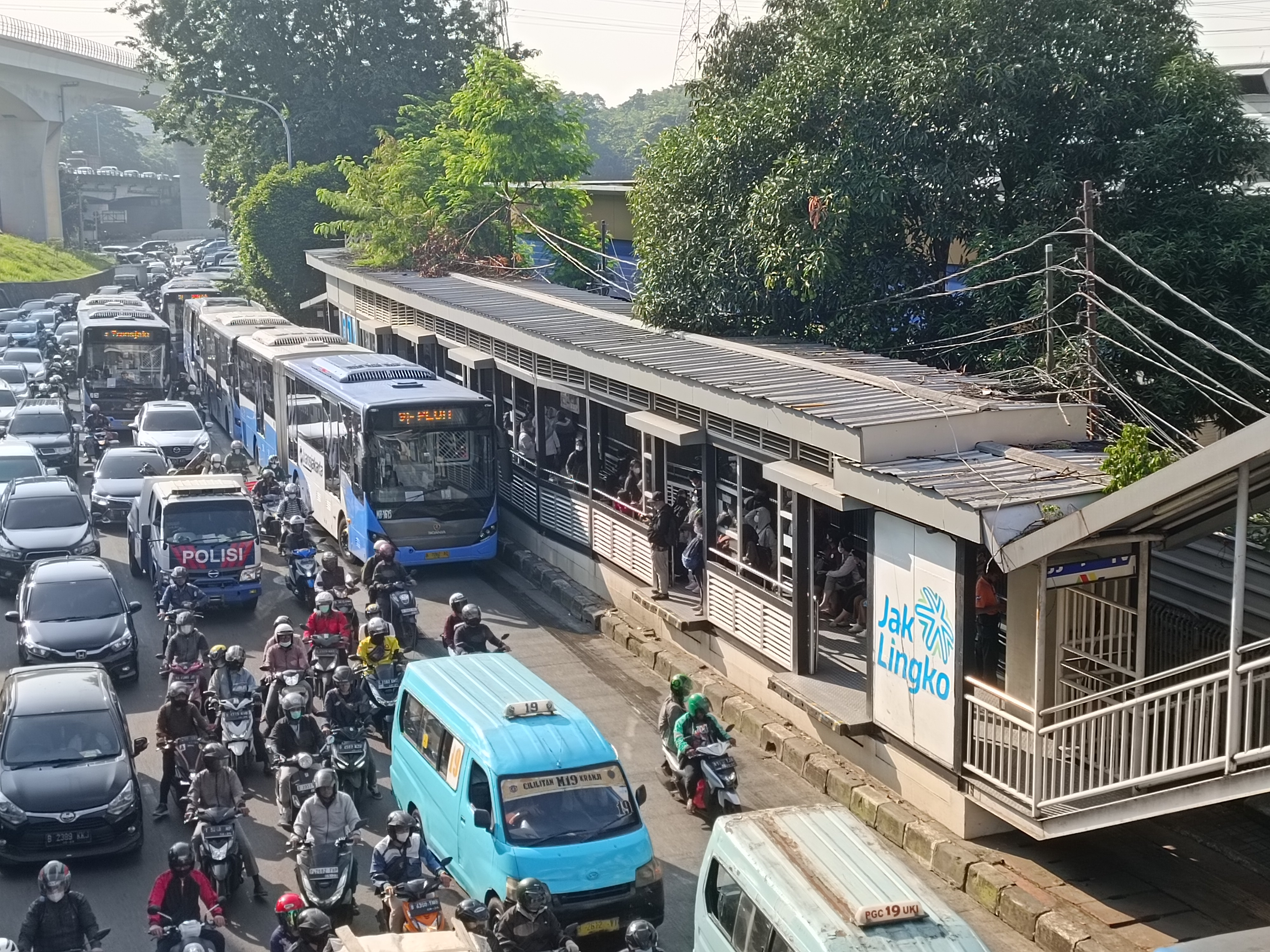
The now-demolished southeast building of the station during rush hour, 2023

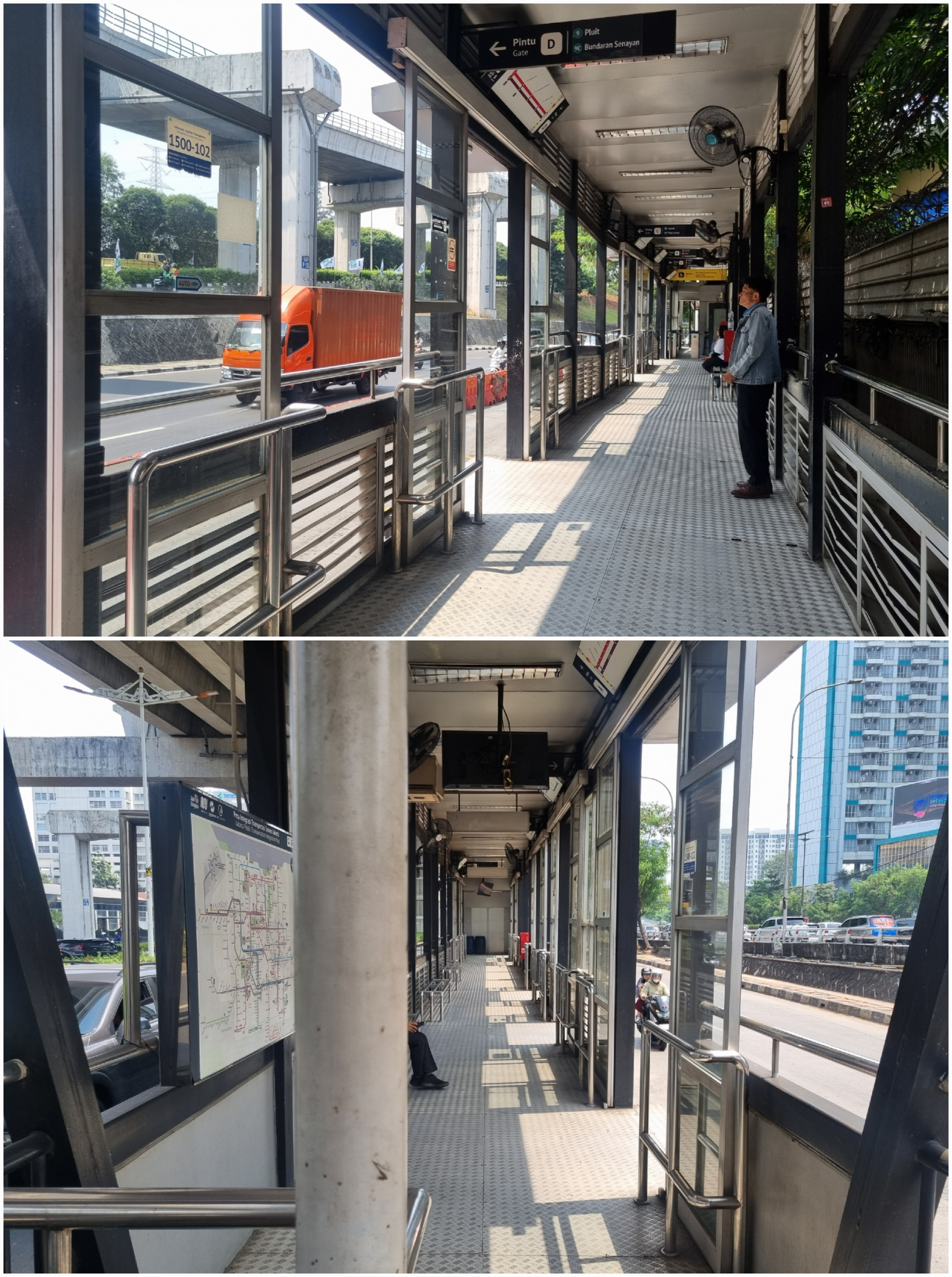
Interior of the southeast (above) and northeast (below) buildings, both demolished in 2025
