= Transjakarta Corridor 7 =

Bus rapid transit route in Indonesia

- Kampung Rambutan – Kampung Melayu
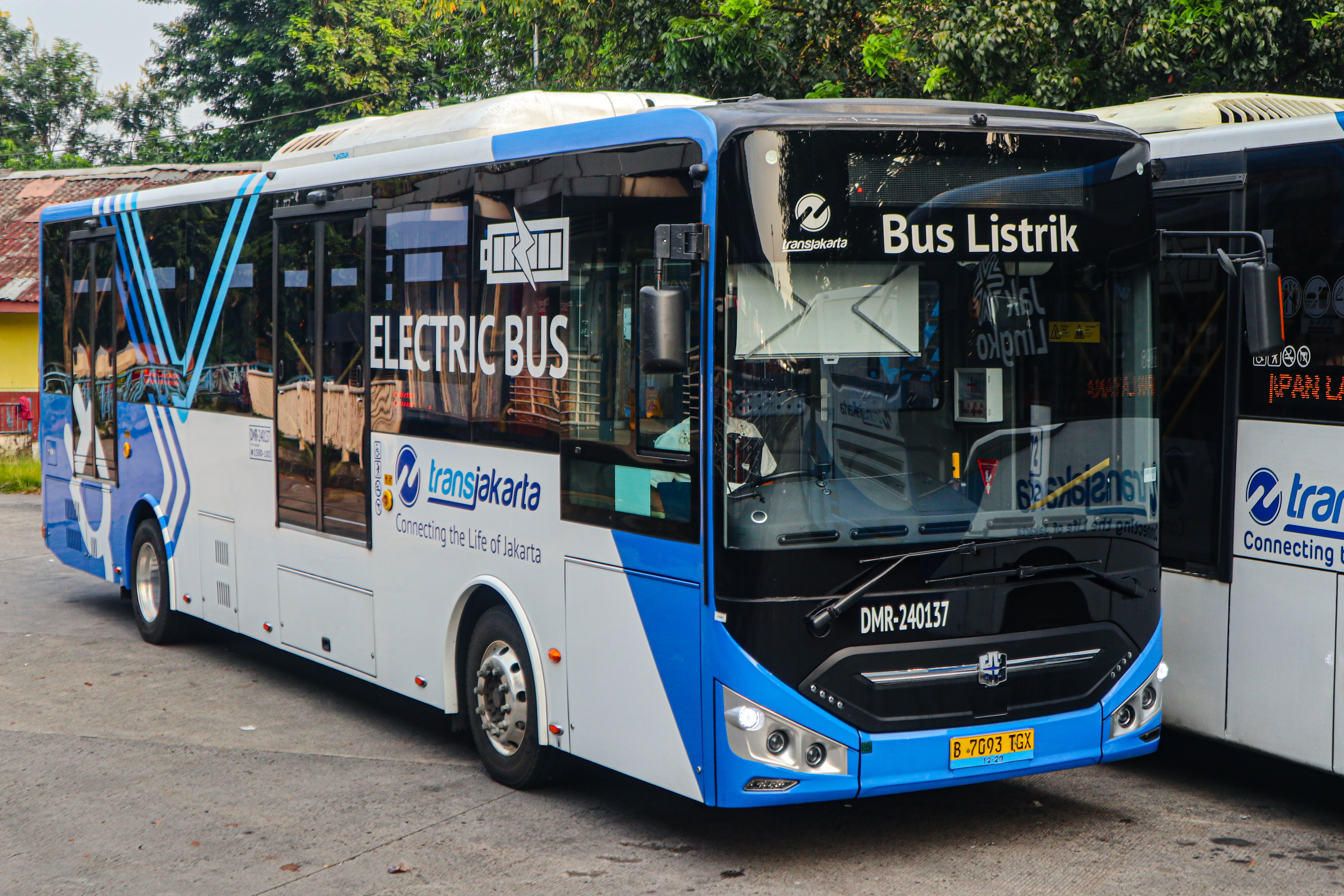
- The Zhongtong electric bus fleet that serves Corridor 7 in service preparation at Kampung Rambutan bus terminal

Overview
- System: Transjakarta
- Operator: PT. Transportasi Jakarta (TJ, infrastructure and staff); Mayasari Bakti (MB/MYS, fleets and drivers); Bianglala Metropolitan (BMP, fleets and drivers)
- Began service: January 27, 2007

Route
- Route type: Street-level bus rapid transit
- Locale: East Jakarta
- Length: 12.57 km
- Stations: 14

Transjakarta Corridor 7 is a bus rapid transit corridor in East Jakarta, Jakarta, Indonesia, operated by Transjakarta. It connects the Kampung Rambutan Bus Terminal in Ciracas to the Kampung Melayu Bus Terminal in Jatinegara. The streets that passed by Corridor 7 are Gedong Timur/Barat, Raya Bogor, Mayjen Sutoyo, MT Haryono, and Otto Iskandardinata streets. This corridor is the only Transjakarta corridor that is not integrated with the KRL Commuterline system, because the distance between the Kampung Melayu station and the nearest Commuterline station, Tebet, is quite far.

Corridor 7 was inaugurated on January 27, 2007, along with corridors 4, 5, and 6, after having a trial run since December 2006.

== List of BRT stations ==
- Currently, all stations are served by buses 24 hours a day.

Corridor 7 (Kampung Rambutan – Kampung Melayu)
Code	Station name	Transfer/Notes	Bus terminal or train station nearby
Stations in order: From top to bottom (downwards) towards Kampung Melayu (→); from bottom to top (upwards) towards Kampung Rambutan (←)
7 01	Kampung Rambutan	Two separate buildings for opposing directions require exiting paid area to transfer: Part 1: Arrivals only; Part 2: Towards Kampung Melayu (→)	Kampung Rambutan Bus Terminal Kampung Rambutan Kampung Rambutan (planned)
7 01	Kampung Rambutan	Kampung Rambutan	Kampung Rambutan Bus Terminal Kampung Rambutan Kampung Rambutan (planned)
7 02	Tanah Merdeka	Two separate buildings for opposing directions require exiting paid area to transfer: Eastbound: Towards Kampung Rambutan (←); Westbound: Towards Kampung Melayu (→)	Tanah Merdeka (planned)
7 02	Tanah Merdeka	Tanah Merdeka	Tanah Merdeka (planned)
7 03	Flyover Raya Bogor	Flyover Raya Bogor	Pasar Rebo Shadow Bus Terminal Raya Bogor (planned)
7 04	Trikora	Trikora	
7 05	Pasar Induk	Pasar Induk	
7 06	Kramat Jati		
7 07	Cililitan	Cililitan	Cililitan Bus Terminal PGC (transfer outside paid area)
7 08 10 21	Cawang Cililitan	Cawang Cililitan	
7 09 9 03 10 20	Cawang Sentral	Cawang Sentral	
7 10 9 04	Cawang	Cawang	Cawang
7 11	Cawang Baru	Cawang Baru	
7 12	Gelanggang Remaja	Gelanggang Remaja	
7 13	Bidara Cina	Bidara Cina	
7 14 5 18 11 16	Kampung Melayu	Kampung Melayu	Kampung Melayu Bus Terminal

== Cross-corridor route ==
=== Route 7F (Kampung Rambutan – Juanda via Cempaka Putih) ===
- This service runs every day, but only during peak periods, at 05:00–09:00 in the morning and 15:00–21:00 in the evening.
- Until March 3, 2023, route 7F serves from Kampung Rambutan to Harmoni Central BRT station. Starting from March 4, 2023, route 7F began to move its terminus to the Juanda BRT station temporarily, due to the construction of the Jakarta MRT Phase 2A.
- Stations indicated by a ← sign have a one-way service towards Kampung Rambutan only. Stations indicated by a → sign have a one-way service towards Juanda only.
- Italic text indicates that the BRT station is temporarily closed for revitalisation works or the bus does not stop at the station.

Route 7F (Kampung Rambutan – Juanda via Cempaka Putih)
Code	Station name	Transfer/Notes	Bus terminal or train station nearby
Stations in order: From top to bottom (downwards) towards Juanda (→); from bottom to top (upwards) towards Kampung Rambutan (←)
7 01	Kampung Rambutan	Two separate buildings for opposing directions require exiting paid area to transfer: Part 1: Arrivals only; Part 2: Towards Juanda (→)	Kampung Rambutan Bus Terminal Kampung Rambutan Kampung Rambutan (planned)
7 01	Kampung Rambutan	Kampung Rambutan	Kampung Rambutan Bus Terminal Kampung Rambutan Kampung Rambutan (planned)
7 02	Tanah Merdeka	Two separate buildings for opposing directions require exiting paid area to transfer: Eastbound: Towards Kampung Rambutan (←); Westbound: Towards Juanda (→)	Tanah Merdeka (planned)
7 02	Tanah Merdeka	Tanah Merdeka	Tanah Merdeka (planned)
7 03	Flyover Raya Bogor	Flyover Raya Bogor	Pasar Rebo Shadow Bus Terminal Raya Bogor (planned)
7 04	Trikora	Trikora	
7 05	Pasar Induk	Pasar Induk	
10 13	Utan Kayu Rawamangun	Utan Kayu Rawamangun	
10 12	Pemuda Pramuka	Pemuda Pramuka Simpang Pramuka (via skybridge, temporarily westbound only)	Pramuka (U/C)
10 11	Kayu Putih Rawasari	Kayu Putih Rawasari	
10 10	Pulo Mas Bypass	Pulo Mas Bypass	
10 09	Cempaka Putih →	Cempaka Putih	
2 06	Cempaka Mas →	Cempaka Mas; Simpang Cempaka (via skybridge)	Sumur Batu (Planned)
Towards Kampung Rambutan (←) heads straight to Pulo Mas Bypass
2 07	Sumur Batu	Sumur Batu	
2 08	Cempaka Baru	Cempaka Baru	Cempaka Baru (Planned)
2 09	Pasar Cempaka Putih	Pasar Cempaka Putih	
2 10	Rawa Selatan	Rawa Selatan	Galur (Planned)
2 11	Galur	Galur	
2 12 14 01	Senen Toyota Rangga	Senen Toyota Rangga; Jaga Jakarta (temporarily via shuttle service 21ST)	Senen (Planned) Pasar Senen Senen Bus Terminal
2 24	Kwitang	Kwitang	Kwitang (Planned)
2 22	Balai Kota →	Balai Kota	
2 21 1 14	Monumen Nasional →	Monumen Nasional	Monas (U/C)
2 20 1 15	Harmoni →	Harmoni	Harmoni (U/C)
2 19 3 14	Pecenongan →	Pecenongan	
Towards Juanda (→) heads straight to Juanda
Towards Kampung Rambutan (←) heads straight to Kwitang
3 16	Pasar Baru ←	Pasar Baru	
2 18 3 15	Juanda	Juanda	Juanda

== Fleets ==
Information correct as of January 2026

=== (Kampung Rambutan - Kampung Melayu) ===
Operator	Type	Caption	Image	Depots
Main BRT Fleet
Perum DAMRI	BYD D9 HF-12 Tidar	Operates every day (05:00-22:00)		Ciputat (South Tangerang City, Banten)
Perum DAMRI	Skywell NJL6126BEV	Operates every day (05:00-22:00)		Cawang
Mayasari Bakti	Mercedes-Benz OH 1626	Operates every day (05:00-22:00)		Cijantung
Bianglala Metropolitan	Mercedes-Benz OH 1626	Operates of night bus		Ciputat (South Tangerang City, Banten)
Reserve BRT Fleet
Swakelola Transjakarta	Mercedes-Benz OH 1526	Operates of weekdays (05:00-22:00)		Cawang
Swakelola Transjakarta	Mercedes-Benz OH 1626	Operates of weekdays (05:00-22:00)		Cawang
Mayasari Bakti	Scania K310IB	Operates of weekend (05:00-22:00)		Cijantung

=== (Kampung Rambutan - Juanda via Cempaka Putih) ===
Operator	Type	Caption	Image	Depots
Main BRT Fleet
Mayasari Bakti	Scania K310IB	Operates every day (05:00-22:00)		Cijantung
Reserve BRT Fleet
Perum DAMRI	Skywell NJL6126BEV	Operates on weekdays (05:00-22:00)		Cawang
Perum DAMRI	Zhongtong Bus N12	Operates on weekdays (05:00-22:00)		Pulo Gadung

== Incidents ==
- Two bomb explosions hit the Kampung Melayu BRT station on May 24, 2017. Three policemen and two attackers were killed. The 11 injured people were taken to several hospitals.

== See also ==
- Transjakarta
  - List of Transjakarta corridors
