= Transjakarta Corridor 9 =

Bus rapid transit route in Indonesia

- Pinang Ranti – Pluit
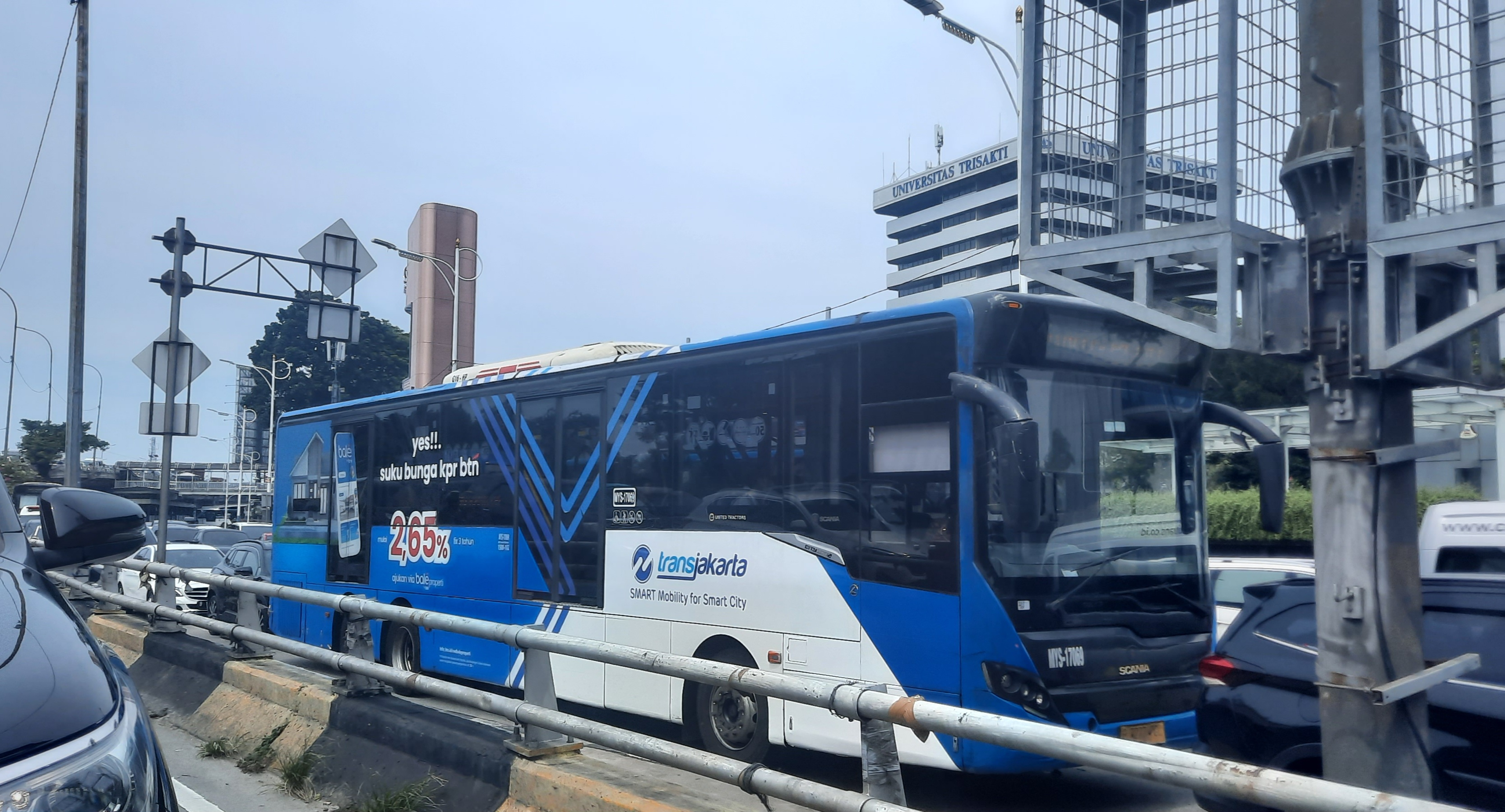
- The Scania K310iB fleet that serves Corridor 9 at Grogol Petamburan, West Jakarta, 2025

Overview
- System: Transjakarta
- Operator: PT. Transportasi Jakarta (TJ, infrastructure, fleets, drivers, and staffs); Mayasari Bakti (MB/MYS, fleets and drivers); Perum DAMRI (DMR, fleets and drivers)
- Began service: 31 December 2010

Route
- Route type: Street-level bus rapid transit
- Locale: East Jakarta; South Jakarta; Central Jakarta; West Jakarta; North Jakarta
- Length: 28.8 km
- Stations: 26

Transjakarta Corridor 9 is a bus rapid transit corridor in Jakarta, Indonesia, operated by Transjakarta. The corridor connects the Pinang Ranti bus terminal in East Jakarta with the Pluit BRT station in North Jakarta. The roads traversed by Corridor 9 are: Jalan Pondok Gede Raya, Jagorawi Toll Road, Jalan Mayjen Sutoyo, Jalan Letjen M.T. Haryono, Jalan Jend. Gatot Subroto, Jalan Letjen S. Parman, Jalan Satria/Prof. Dr. Makaliwe, Jalan Prof. Dr. Latumeten, Jalan Jembatan Tiga, and Jalan Pluit Putri/Putra. Corridor 9 is integrated with the KAI Commuter Bogor Line service at the Cikoko BRT station that connects to the Cawang railway station and the Tangerang Line at Kali Grogol BRT station that connects to the Grogol railway station. Corridor 9 is also integrated with Jabodebek LRT from Cawang to Pancoran BRT stations.

Starting from the Kali Grogol to Cawang station, Corridor 9 runs parallel to the adjacent Cawang–Tomang–Pluit segment of the Jakarta Inner Ring Road. This section of the expressway is mostly built at-grade, being positioned in the middle and sandwiched between the arterial road and pair of dedicated bus lanes. As such, most BRT stations from Ciliwung to Kali Grogol are made of two buildings (one towards Pluit, and another towards Pinang Ranti) separated in between by the expressway and connected by a skybridge. Due to the skybridge being located outside paid area in most stations (with no paid area connecting the two buildings), changing direction or transferring to a different corridor or route that stops at the building of the opposite direction requires tapping to pay again.

This corridor is also the longest route among other Transjakarta corridors. Its total length is 28.8 km, and it crosses 5 administrative cities of the Special Capital Region of Jakarta province, namely North Jakarta, West Jakarta, Central Jakarta, South Jakarta and East Jakarta. Corridor 9 is the second busiest Transjakarta BRT corridor, ranked behind Corridor 1 and after Corridor 8.

There is a 35-minute express service which only operates from 06:00-09:00 between Grogol Reformasi and Semanggi. Transjakarta launched the service on 8 May 2023.

== History ==
Corridor 9, along with Corridor 10, commenced service on 31 December 2010 to support the upcoming 2011 Southeast Asian Games. The inauguration ceremony took place at the S. Parman Podomoro City BRT station (now Tanjung Duren), with then Jakarta Governor Fauzi Bowo officially inaugurated both corridors.

Starting on 1 June 2014, Corridor 9, along with Corridor 1 and 3 began to operate 24 hours a day, with buses only stopping at certain BRT stations. Starting from February 2016, AMARI service stops at all BRT stations without exception, so the bus stops at all stations round-the-clock.

As Transjakarta's innovation to improve its services, the Grogol Reformasi–Semanggi express service was launched on 8 May 2023. It was launched to accelerate time travel during rush hours up to 35 minutes, so it only operates from 06:00 to 09:00.

== List of BRT stations ==
- Currently, all stations are served by buses 24 hours a day.
- Italic text indicates that the BRT station is temporarily closed for revitalisation works or the bus does not stop at the station.

Corridor 9 (Pinang Ranti – Pluit)
Code	Station name	Transfer/Notes	Bus terminal and train station nearby
Stations in order: From top to bottom (downwards) towards Pluit (→); from bottom to top (upwards) towards Pinang Ranti (←)
9 01	Pinang Ranti	Two separate buildings for opposing directions require exiting paid area to transfer: Part 1: Arrivals only; Part 2: Towards Pluit (→)	Pinang Ranti Bus Terminal
9 01	Pinang Ranti	Pinang Ranti	Pinang Ranti Bus Terminal
9 02	Makasar	Makasar	TMII
9 03 7 09 10 20	Cawang Sentral	Cawang Sentral	
9 04 7 10	Cawang	Cawang	Cawang
9 05	Ciliwung	Two separate buildings for opposing directions require exiting paid area to transfer: Eastbound: Towards Pinang Ranti (←); Westbound: Towards Pluit (→)	Ciliwung
9 05	Ciliwung	Ciliwung	Ciliwung
9 06	Cikoko	Two separate buildings for opposing directions require exiting paid area to transfer: Eastbound: Towards Pinang Ranti (←); Westbound: Towards Pluit (→)	Cawang Cikoko
9 06	Cikoko	Cikoko	Cawang Cikoko
9 07	Tebet Eco Park	Two separate buildings for opposing directions require exiting paid area to transfer: Eastbound: Towards Pinang Ranti (←); Westbound: Towards Pluit (→)	
9 07	Tebet Eco Park	Tebet Eco Park	
9 08	Pancoran Tugu	Pancoran Tugu	
9 09	Pancoran	Two separate buildings for opposing directions require exiting paid area to transfer: Eastbound: Towards Pinang Ranti (←); Westbound: Towards Pluit (→)	Pancoran Bank BJB
9 09	Pancoran	Pancoran	Pancoran Bank BJB
9 10	Tegal Parang	Two separate buildings for opposing directions require exiting paid area to transfer: Eastbound: Towards Pinang Ranti (←); Westbound: Towards Pluit (→)	Tegal Mampang (transfer outside paid area)
9 10	Tegal Parang	Tegal Parang	Tegal Mampang (transfer outside paid area)
9 11	Simpang Kuningan	Simpang Kuningan Underpass Kuningan (via skybridge)	
9 12	Denpasar	Two separate buildings for opposing directions require exiting paid area to transfer: Eastbound: Towards Pinang Ranti (←); Westbound: Towards Pluit (→)	
9 12	Denpasar	Denpasar	
9 13	Widya Chandra Telkomsel	Two separate buildings for opposing directions require exiting paid area to transfer: Eastbound: Towards Pinang Ranti (←); Westbound: Towards Pluit (→)	
9 13	Widya Chandra Telkomsel	Widya Chandra Telkomsel	
9 14	Semanggi	Semanggi Bendungan Hilir (via skybridge)*)	
9 15	Gerbang Pemuda	Two separate buildings for opposing directions require exiting paid area to transfer: Eastbound: Towards Pinang Ranti (←); Westbound: Towards Pluit (→)	
9 15	Gerbang Pemuda	Gerbang Pemuda	
9 16	Petamburan	Petamburan	
9 17	Kemanggisan	Two separate buildings for opposing directions require exiting paid area to transfer: Northbound: Towards Pluit (→); Southbound: Towards Pinang Ranti (←)	
9 17	Kemanggisan	Kemanggisan	
9 18	Kota Bambu	Two separate buildings for opposing directions require exiting paid area to transfer: Northbound: Towards Pluit (→); Southbound: Towards Pinang Ranti (←)	
9 18	Kota Bambu	Kota Bambu	
9 19 8 20	Tanjung Duren	Two separate buildings for opposing directions require exiting paid area to transfer: Eastbound: Towards Pinang Ranti (←); Westbound: Towards Pluit (→)	Taman Anggrek (planned)
9 19 8 20	Tanjung Duren	Tanjung Duren	Taman Anggrek (planned)
9 20 8 19	Grogol Reformasi	Grogol Reformasi; Grogol (via skybridge)	Grogol (planned) Grogol Bus Terminal
9 21	Kali Grogol		Grogol
9 22	Jembatan Besi		
9 23	Jembatan Dua		
9 24	Jembatan Tiga		
9 25 12 25	Penjaringan	Penjaringan	
9 26 12 01	Pluit	Two separate buildings for opposing directions require exiting paid area to transfer: Part 1: Arrivals only; Part 2: Towards Pinang Ranti (←)	
9 26 12 01	Pluit	Pluit	

* Bendungan Hilir to Semanggi BRT station via skywalk bridge which may be too steep for disabled people and takes at least a 10 minute walk.

== Cross-corridor routes ==
=== Route 9A (Cililitan – Grogol Reformasi) ===
- Stations indicated by a ← sign has a one way service towards Cililitan only.

Route 9A (Cililitan – Grogol Reformasi)
Code	Station name	Transfer/Notes	Bus terminal and train station nearby
Stations in order: From top to bottom (downwards) towards Grogol Reformasi (→); from bottom to top (upwards) towards Cililitan (←)
7 07	Cililitan	Cililitan	Cililitan Bus Terminal PGC (transfer outside paid area)
7 08 10 21	Cawang Cililitan	Cawang Cililitan	
9 04 7 10	Cawang	Cawang	Cawang
9 05	Ciliwung	Two separate buildings for opposing directions require exiting paid area to transfer: Eastbound: Towards Cililitan (←); Westbound: Towards Grogol Reformasi (→)	Ciliwung
9 05	Ciliwung	Ciliwung	Ciliwung
9 06	Cikoko	Two separate buildings for opposing directions require exiting paid area to transfer: Eastbound: Towards Cililitan (←); Westbound: Towards Grogol Reformasi (→)	Cawang Cikoko
9 06	Cikoko	Cikoko	Cawang Cikoko
9 07	Tebet Eco Park	Two separate buildings for opposing directions require exiting paid area to transfer: Eastbound: Towards Cililitan (←); Westbound: Towards Grogol Reformasi (→)	
9 07	Tebet Eco Park	Tebet Eco Park	
9 08	Pancoran Tugu	Pancoran Tugu	
9 09	Pancoran	Two separate buildings for opposing directions require exiting paid area to transfer: Eastbound: Towards Cililitan (←); Westbound: Towards Grogol Reformasi (→)	Pancoran Bank BJB
9 09	Pancoran	Pancoran	Pancoran Bank BJB
9 10	Tegal Parang	Two separate buildings for opposing directions require exiting paid area to transfer: Eastbound: Towards Cililitan (←); Westbound: Towards Grogol Reformasi (→)	Tegal Mampang (transfer outside paid area)
9 10	Tegal Parang	Tegal Parang	Tegal Mampang (transfer outside paid area)
9 11	Simpang Kuningan	Simpang Kuningan Underpass Kuningan (via skybridge)	
9 12	Denpasar	Two separate buildings for opposing directions require exiting paid area to transfer: Eastbound: Towards Cililitan (←); Westbound: Towards Grogol Reformasi (→)	
9 12	Denpasar	Denpasar	
9 13	Widya Chandra Telkomsel	Two separate buildings for opposing directions require exiting paid area to transfer: Eastbound: Towards Cililitan (←); Westbound: Towards Grogol Reformasi (→)	
9 13	Widya Chandra Telkomsel	Widya Chandra Telkomsel	
9 14	Semanggi	Semanggi; Bendungan Hilir (via skybridge)*)	
9 15	Gerbang Pemuda	Two separate buildings for opposing directions require exiting paid area to transfer: Eastbound: Towards Cililitan (←); Westbound: Towards Grogol Reformasi (→)	
9 15	Gerbang Pemuda	Gerbang Pemuda	
9 16	Petamburan	Petamburan	
9 17	Kemanggisan	Two separate buildings for opposing directions require exiting paid area to transfer: Northbound: Towards Grogol Reformasi (→); Southbound: Towards Cililitan (←)	
9 17	Kemanggisan	Kemanggisan	
9 18	Kota Bambu	Two separate buildings for opposing directions require exiting paid area to transfer: Northbound: Towards Grogol Reformasi (→); Southbound: Towards Cililitan (←)	
9 18	Kota Bambu	Kota Bambu	
9 19 8 20	Tanjung Duren	Two separate buildings for opposing directions require exiting paid area to transfer: Eastbound: Towards Cililitan (←); Westbound: Towards Grogol Reformasi (→)	Taman Anggrek (planned)
9 19 8 20	Tanjung Duren	Tanjung Duren	Taman Anggrek (planned)
9 20 8 19	Grogol Reformasi	Grogol Reformasi; Grogol (via skybridge)	Grogol (planned) Grogol Bus Terminal

* Bendungan Hilir to Semanggi BRT station via skywalk bridge which may be too steep for disabled people and takes at least a 10 minute walk.

=== Route 9C (Pinang Ranti – Bundaran Senayan) ===
- Stations indicated by a ← sign have a one way service towards Pinang Ranti only.
- Italic text indicates that the BRT station is temporarily closed for revitalisation works or the bus does not stop at the station.

Route 9C (Pinang Ranti – Bundaran Senayan)
Code	Station name	Transfer/Notes	Bus terminal and train station nearby
Stations in order: From top to bottom (downwards) towards Bundaran Senayan (→); from bottom to top (upwards) towards Pinang Ranti (←)
9 01	Pinang Ranti	Two separate buildings for opposing directions require exiting paid area to transfer: Part 1: Arrivals only; Part 2: Towards Bundaran Senayan (→)	Pinang Ranti Bus Terminal
9 01	Pinang Ranti	Pinang Ranti	Pinang Ranti Bus Terminal
9 02	Makasar	Makasar	TMII
9 03 7 09 10 20	Cawang Sentral	Cawang Sentral	
9 04 7 10	Cawang	Cawang	Cawang
9 05	Ciliwung	Two separate buildings for opposing directions require exiting paid area to transfer: Eastbound: Towards Pinang Ranti (←); Westbound: Towards Bundaran Senayan (→)	Ciliwung
9 05	Ciliwung	Ciliwung	Ciliwung
9 06	Cikoko	Two separate buildings for opposing directions require exiting paid area to transfer: Eastbound: Towards Pinang Ranti (←); Westbound: Towards Bundaran Senayan (→)	Cawang Cikoko
9 06	Cikoko	Cikoko	Cawang Cikoko
9 07	Tebet Eco Park	Two separate buildings for opposing directions require exiting paid area to transfer: Eastbound: Towards Pinang Ranti (←); Westbound: Towards Bundaran Senayan (→)	
9 07	Tebet Eco Park	Tebet Eco Park	
9 08	Pancoran Tugu	Pancoran Tugu	
9 09	Pancoran	Two separate buildings for opposing directions require exiting paid area to transfer: Eastbound: Towards Pinang Ranti (←); Westbound: Towards Bundaran Senayan (→)	Pancoran Bank BJB
9 09	Pancoran	Pancoran	Pancoran Bank BJB
9 10	Tegal Parang	Two separate buildings for opposing directions require exiting paid area to transfer: Eastbound: Towards Pinang Ranti (←); Westbound: Towards Bundaran Senayan (→)	Tegal Mampang (transfer outside paid area)
9 10	Tegal Parang	Tegal Parang	Tegal Mampang (transfer outside paid area)
9 11	Simpang Kuningan	Simpang Kuningan Underpass Kuningan (via skybridge)	
9 12	Denpasar	Two separate buildings for opposing directions require exiting paid area to transfer: Eastbound: Towards Pinang Ranti (←); Westbound: Towards Bundaran Senayan (→)	
9 12	Denpasar	Denpasar	
9 13	Widya Chandra Telkomsel	Two separate buildings for opposing directions require exiting paid area to transfer: Eastbound: Towards Pinang Ranti (←); Westbound: Towards Bundaran Senayan (→)	
9 13	Widya Chandra Telkomsel	Widya Chandra Telkomsel	
Towards Bundaran Senayan (→) heads straight to Senayan Bank Jakarta
9 14	Semanggi ←	Semanggi; Bendungan Hilir (via skybridge)*)	
1 05	Senayan Bank Jakarta	Senayan Bank Jakarta	
1 04	Bundaran Senayan	Bundaran Senayan	Senayan Mastercard

* Bendungan Hilir to Semanggi BRT station via skywalk bridge which may be too steep for disabled people and takes at least a 10 minute walk.

=== Route 9N (Pinang Ranti – Simpang Cawang) ===
- Only operates on weekends (Saturday and Sunday) and public holidays.

Route 9N (Pinang Ranti – Simpang Cawang)
Code	Station name	Transfer/Notes	Bus terminal and train station nearby
Stations in order: From top to bottom (downwards) towards Simpang Cawang (→); from bottom to top (upwards) towards Pinang Ranti (←)
9 01	Pinang Ranti	Two separate buildings for opposing directions require exiting paid area to transfer: Part 1: Arrivals only; Part 2: Towards Simpang Cawang (→)	Pinang Ranti Bus Terminal
9 01	Pinang Ranti	Pinang Ranti	Pinang Ranti Bus Terminal
9 02	Makasar	Makasar	TMII
9 03 7 09 10 20	Cawang Sentral	Cawang Sentral	
10 19	Simpang Cawang	Simpang Cawang	

== Fleets ==
Information correct as of December 2025

=== (Pinang Ranti - Pluit) ===
Operator	Type	Caption	Image	Depots
Main BRT Fleet
Mayasari Bakti	Mercedes-Benz OH 1626	operates every day (05:00–22:00 WIB)		Cijantung
Mayasari Bakti	Scania K310IB	operates every day (05:00–22:00 WIB)		Cijantung
Mayasari Bakti	Scania K310IB	operates every day (05:00–22:00 WIB)		Pulo Gadung
Mayasari Bakti	Scania K320IA	operates every day (05:00–22:00 WIB)		Pulo Gadung
Perum DAMRI	Skywell NJL6126BEV	Operates of night bus		Cakung
Perum DAMRI	Zhongtong N12	Operates of night bus		Pulo Gadung
Perum DAMRI	Zhongtong LCK6180GC	Operates every day		Pulo Gadung
Reserve BRT Fleet
Swakelola Transjakarta	Hino RK1 JSNL	operates on weekdays (05:00–22:00 WIB)		Kedaung Kali Angke
Swakelola Transjakarta	Mercedes-Benz OH 1526	operates on weekdays (05:00–22:00 WIB)		Cawang
Swakelola Transjakarta	Mercedes-Benz OC500	operates on weekdays (05:00–22:00 WIB)		Cawang
Swakelola Transjakarta	Scania K320IA	operates on weekdays (05:00–22:00 WIB)		Pulo Gadung

=== (Cililitan - Grogol Reformasi) ===
Operator	Type	Caption	Image	Depots
Main BRT Fleet
Mayasari Bakti	Scania K310IB	operates every day (05:00–22:00 WIB)		Pulo Gadung
Mayasari Bakti	Scania K320IA	operates every day (05:00–22:00 WIB)		Pulo Gadung
Steady Safe	Volvo B11R	operates every day (05:00–22:00 WIB)		Kedaung Kali Angke
Reserve BRT Fleet
Swakelola Transjakarta	Hino RK1 JSNL	operates on weekdays (05:00–22:00 WIB)		Kedaung Kali Angke
Swakelola Transjakarta	Mercedes-Benz OC500	operates on weekdays (05:00–22:00 WIB)		Cawang

=== (Pinang Ranti - Bundaran Senayan) ===
Operator	Type	Caption	Image	Depots
Main BRT Fleet
Mayasari Bakti	Scania K310IB	operates every day (05:00–22:00 WIB)		Pulo Gadung
Mayasari Bakti	Scania K320IA	operates every day (05:00–22:00 WIB)		Pulo Gadung
Mayasari Bakti	Mercedes-Benz OH 1626	operates every day (05:00–22:00 WIB)		Cijantung
Perum DAMRI	Zhongtong Bus LCK6180GC	operates every day (05:00–22:00 WIB)		Pulo Gadung
Reserve BRT Fleet
Swakelola Transjakarta	Scania K320IA	operates on weekdays (05:00–22:00 WIB)		Pulo Gadung
Swakelola Transjakarta	Mercedes-Benz OC500	operates on weekdays (05:00–22:00 WIB)		Cawang
Perum DAMRI	Skywell NJL6126BEV	operates on weekdays (05:00–22:00 WIB)		Cakung

== See also ==
- Transjakarta
  - List of Transjakarta corridors
