= Petamburan (Transjakarta) =

Bus rapid transit station in Jakarta, Indonesia

9 19 Petamburan
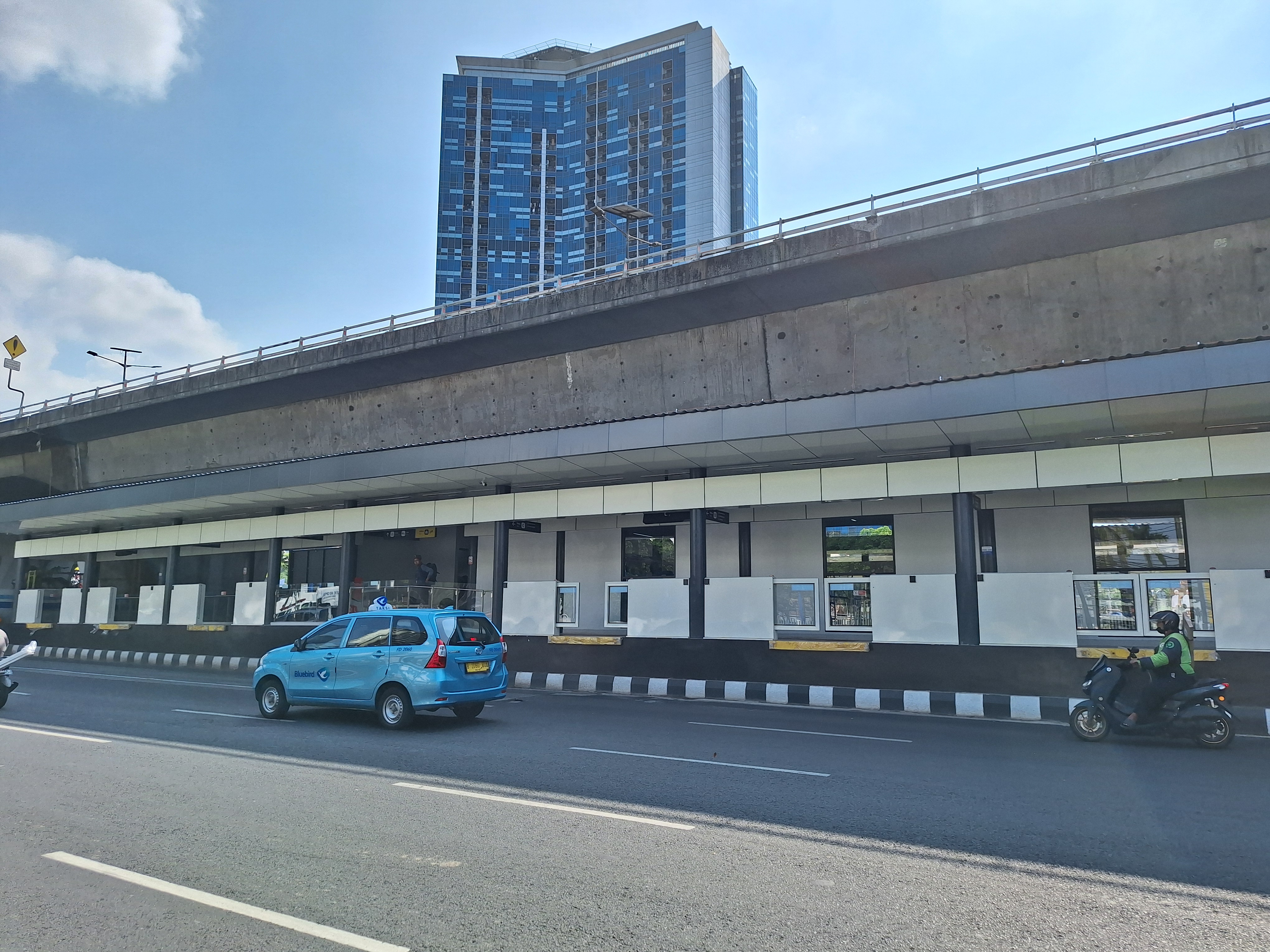
- East side of the building for eastbound buses

General information
- Location: Jenderal Gatot Subroto St., Petamburan, Tanah Abang, Central Jakarta, Jakarta, Indonesia
- Coordinates: 6.2019°S 106.8000°E
- System: Transjakarta
- Owner: Transjakarta
- Operator: Transjakarta
- Lines: List of Transjakarta corridors#Cross-corridor routes List of TransJakarta corridors#Corridor 9 List of TransJakarta corridors#Cross-corridor routes
- Platforms: Two side platforms

Construction
- Structure type: At-grade
- Cycle facilities: Bicycle parking
- Accessible: Yes

History
- Opened: 31 December 2010
- Rebuilt: 2023
- Former names: Slipi Petamburan

Services
Preceding		Following
Kemanggisan towards Kalideres	Corridor 3 Route 3F	Gerbang Pemuda towards Senayan Bank Jakarta
Gerbang Pemuda towards Pinang Ranti	Corridor 9	Kemanggisan towards Pluit
Gerbang Pemuda towards Cililitan	Corridor 9 Route 9A	Kemanggisan towards Grogol Reformasi
Kemanggisan towards Tanjung Priok	Corridor 10 Route 10H	Gerbang Pemuda towards Bundaran Senayan
Location

Petamburan is a Transjakarta bus rapid transit station located at the northwestern end of Jenderal Gatot Subroto Street in Petamburan (hence the name), Tanah Abang, Central Jakarta, Indonesia, serving Corridor 9. It is located beside the road junction between Gatot Subroto, Palmerah Utara, Letjen S. Parman and K.S. Tubun Streets, and built below the Jakarta Inner Ring Road viaduct.

== History ==
Petamburan BRT station was originally named Slipi Petamburan, which commenced operations alongside the opening of Corridor 9 on 31 December 2010. On 31 May 2023, the BRT station was temporarily closed for revitalisation, during which Transjakarta provided the shuttle service 8ST (Senayan JCC–Slipi Kemanggisan) as an alternative for affected passengers. After seven months of revitalisation, the BRT station was reopened on 30 December 2023 with a new name Petamburan.

== Building and layout ==
Petamburan is one of the five BRT stations of Corridor 9 located below the Jakarta Inner Ring Road viaduct, the other being Pancoran Tugu, Simpang Kuningan, Grogol Reformasi and Kali Grogol. The current 2023 design is more spacious than the previous one, with six platform bays on each side, and now features toilets and a prayer room (musala). Both platform buildings are connected by a linkway within the paid area.

East	to Senayan Bank Jakarta and to Bundaran Senayan	to Pinang Ranti and to Cililitan (Gerbang Pemuda) →
	Side platform, the doors are opened on the right side of the bus travel direction
	Jakarta Inner Ring Road →	Linkway	(to Bekasi/Bogor) →
← (to Tangerang)	← Jakarta Inner Ring Road	Linkway
	Side platform, the doors are opened on the right side of the bus travel direction
West	← (Kemanggisan) to Pluit and to Grogol Reformasi	to Kalideres and to Tanjung Priok

== Non-BRT bus services ==
Service type	Route	Destination	Notes
Inner city feeder		Blok M–Ancol	Inside the station
Inner city feeder		Petamburan–Kebayoran via Asia-Afrika	Inside the station
Inner city feeder		Jelambar–Kebayoran	Inside the station for buses towards Kebayoran Outside the station for buses towards Jelambar
Cross-border feeder (Transjabodetabek)		Alam Sutera–Blok M	Inside the station
Cross-border feeder (Transjabodetabek)		Blok M – Soekarno–Hatta International Airport	Outside the station
Cross-border feeder (Transjabodetabek)		Poris Plawad–Petamburan	Outside the station
Cross-border feeder (Transjabodetabek)		Pantai Indah Kapuk (PIK) 2–Blok M	Inside the station
Mikrotrans Jak Lingko	JAK-11	Tanah Abang–Kebayoran	Outside the station
Mikrotrans Jak Lingko	JAK-12	Tanah Abang–Kebayoran via Pos Pengumben	Outside the station
Mikrotrans Jak Lingko	JAK-14	Tanah Abang–Pasar Meruya Ilir	Outside the station
Mikrotrans Jak Lingko	JAK-54	Grogol–Pasar Bendungan Hilir	Outside the station

== Nearby places ==
- GP Plaza
- Grand Slipi Tower
- Jakarta Design Center

== Incidents ==
- On 21 July 2020, a man fainted and collapsed inside a bus and was taken out by another passenger when the bus arrived at the then-named Slipi Petamburan BRT station. He later died allegedly due to illness, and was rushed to a hospital nearby for autopsy process. Because the incident occurred during the COVID-19 pandemic, Slipi Petamburan BRT station was temporarily closed for sterilisation and disinfection until it was reopened at 19:00 later that night.
- On 30 September 2024, a bus owned by Presidential Security Force crashed into the western platform building after it trespassed the restricted BRT lane. The station building sustained light damage. There were no casualties reported.

== Gallery ==
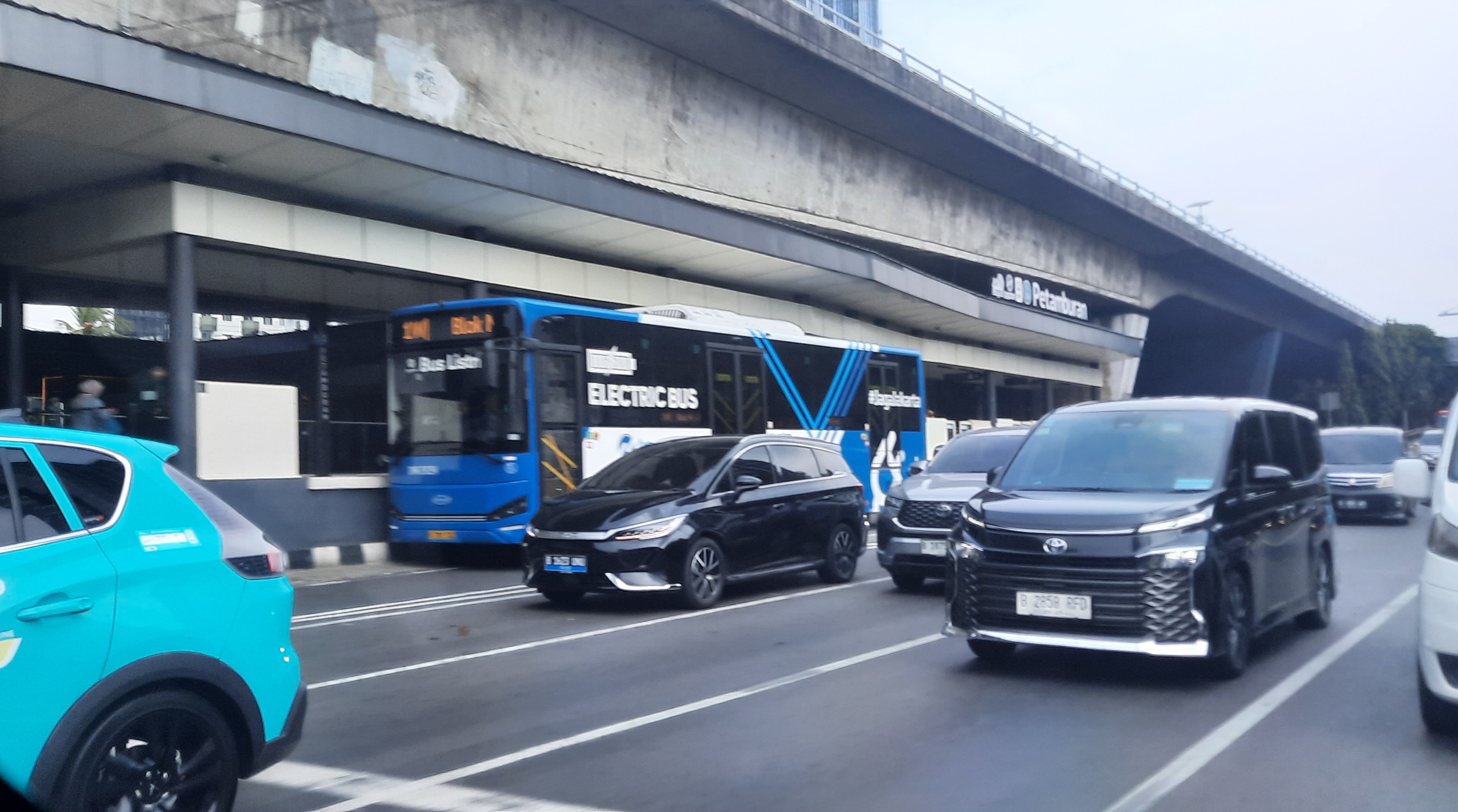
A northbound Transjakarta electric bus stopping at Petamburan station

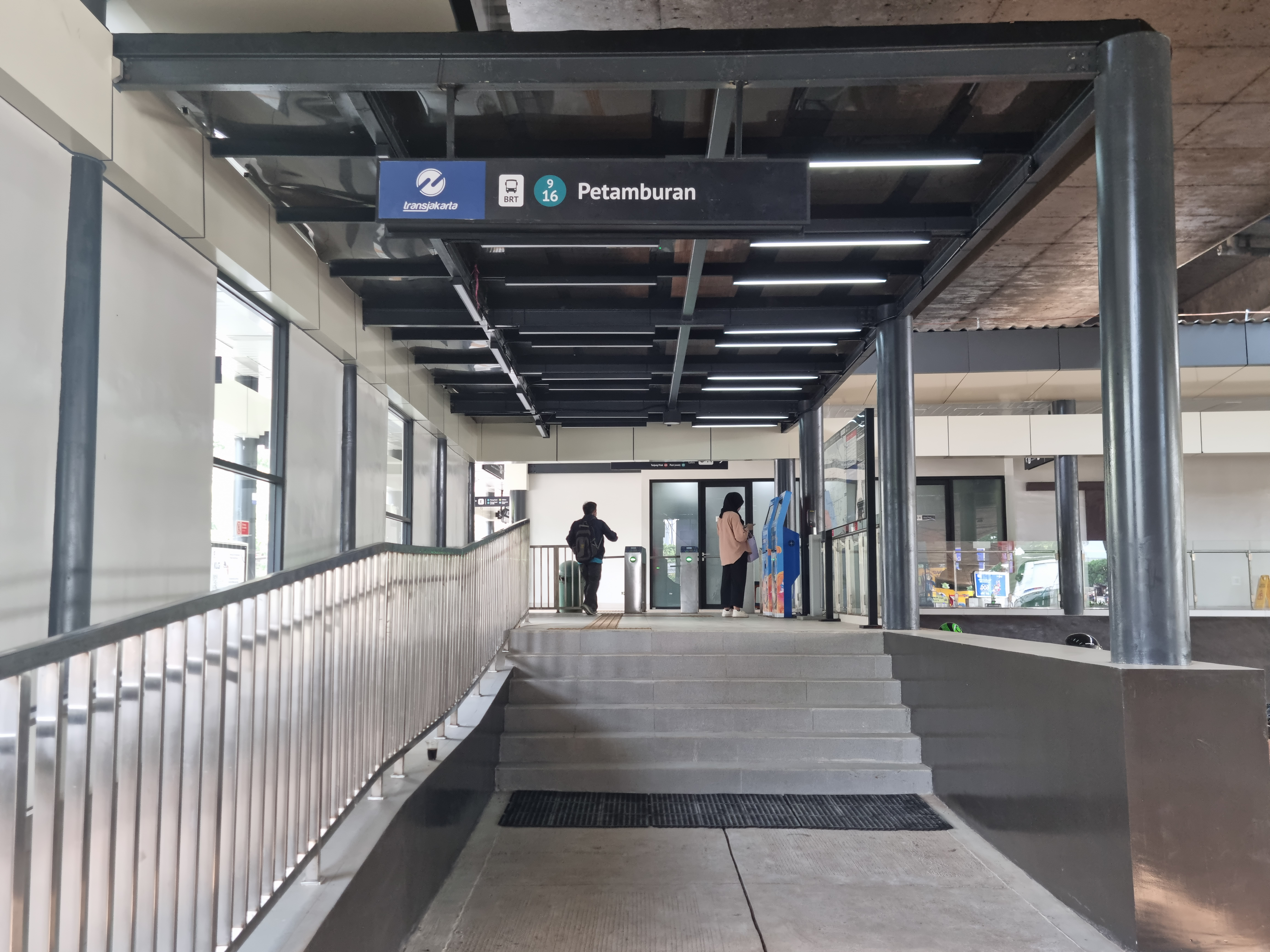
Entrance of the station

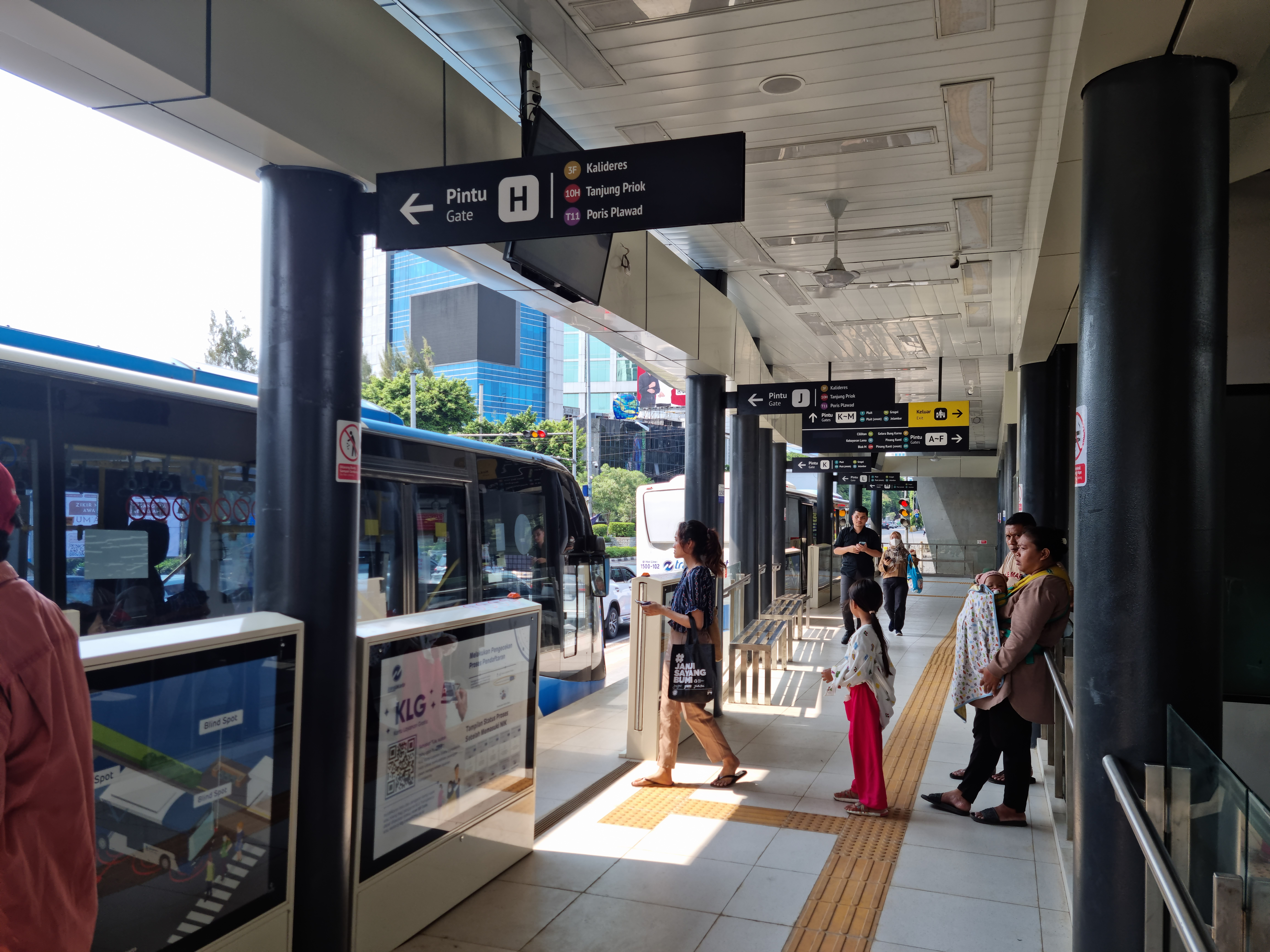
Interior of the west platform for westbound buses

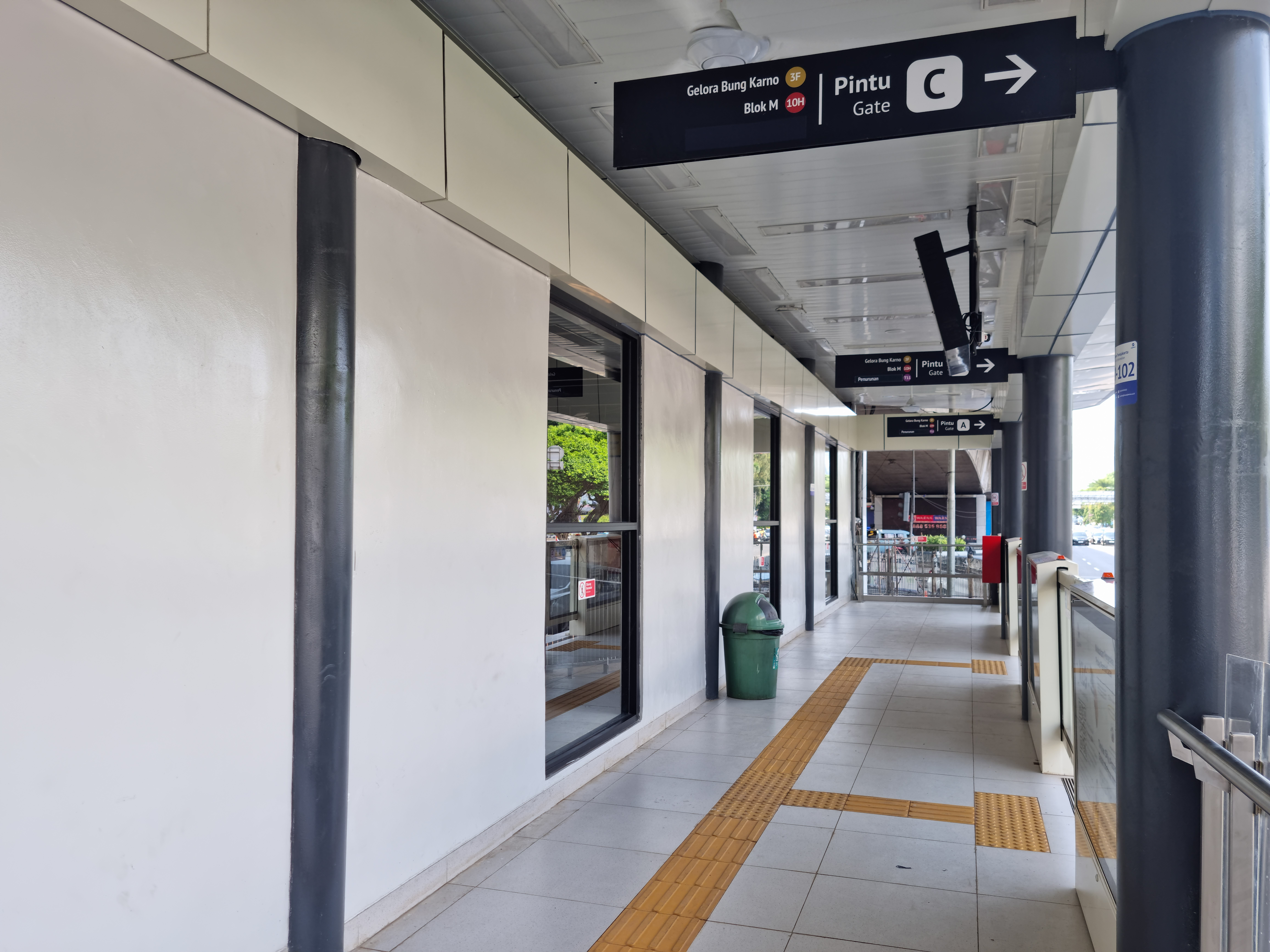
Interior of the east platform

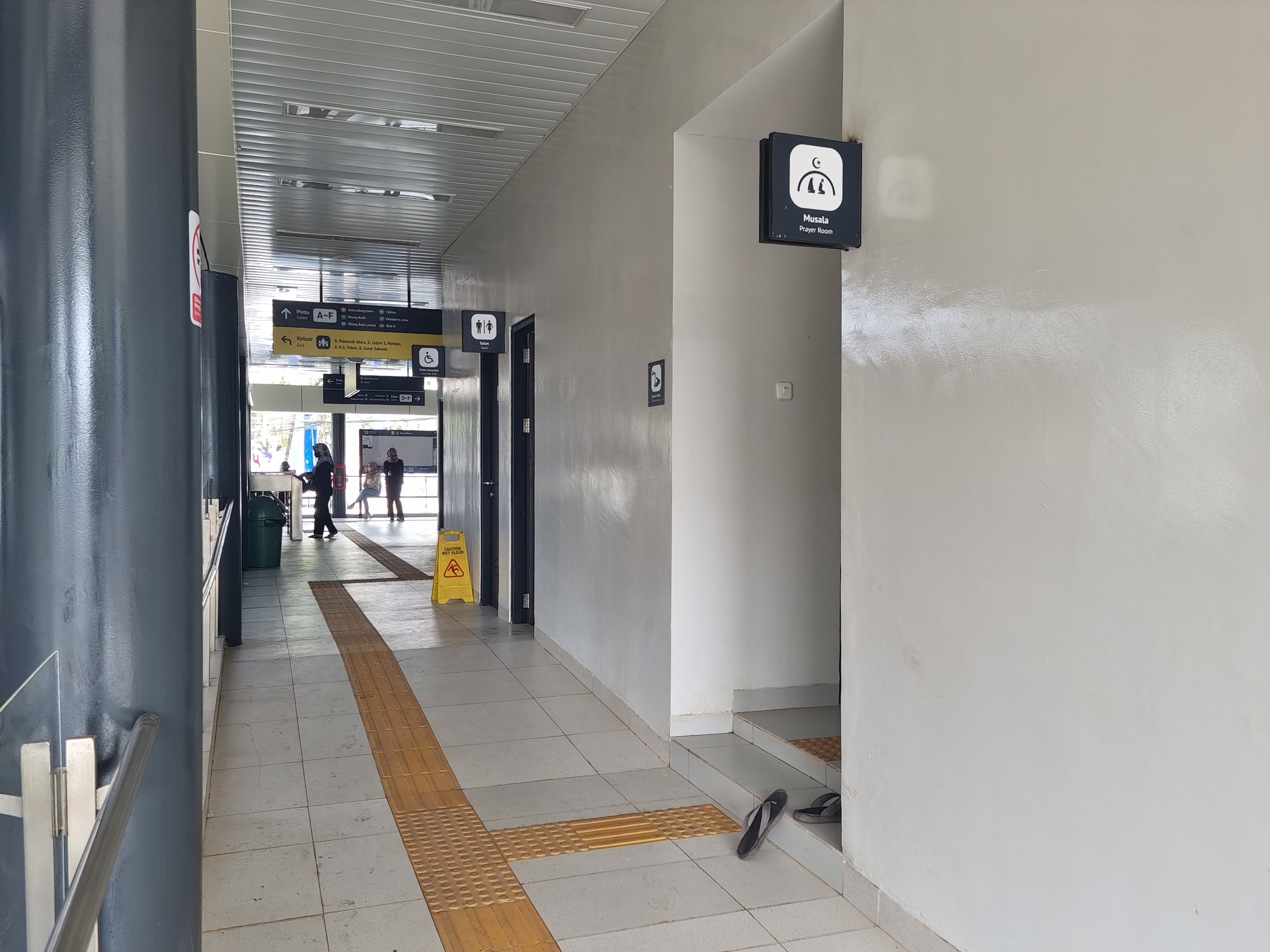
A prayer room (musala) and toilets within the east platform building
