= Jalan Letnan Jenderal MT Haryono =

Road in Jakarta, Indonesia

Jalan MT Haryono
- Owner: Pemprov DKI Jakarta
- Maintained by: Dinas Pekerjaan Umum DKI Jakarta
- Length: 3.5 km (2.2 mi)
- Location: Jakarta, Indonesia
- From: Cawang, Kramat Jati, East Jakarta
- To: Pancoran Statue, Pancoran, Pancoran, South Jakarta

Jalan Lieutenant General MT Haryono or Jalan MT Haryono is one of the main roads of Jakarta, Indonesia. The road is named after an Indonesian National Hero Lieutenant General Anumerta Mas Tirtodarmo Haryono . This road stretches 3.5 KM from Cawang, Kramat Jati, East Jakarta to Pancoran Statue, Pancoran, Pancoran, South Jakarta. This road is traversed by Jakarta Inner Ring Road and TransJakarta corridor 9 and 7. This road was built in 1970s as Gatot Subroto Road had continued past Tebet and becoming M.T. Haryono Road to Cawang and meet the junction with Major Jendral Panjaitan Road. This road crosses 9 urban villages of Jakarta, namely:

- Cawang, Kramat Jati, East Jakarta
- Cipinang Cempedak, Jatinegara, East Jakarta
- Bali Mester, Jatinegara, East Jakarta
- Bidaracina, Jatinegara, East Jakarta
- Kebon Baru, Tebet, South Jakarta
- Cikoko, Pancoran, South Jakarta
- Tebet Timur, Tebet, South Jakarta
- Tebet Barat, Tebet, South Jakarta
- Pancoran, Pancoran, South Jakarta

== Intersection ==
This road has five intersections:

- Intersection of Cawang (towards Scouting, Cililitan Wholesale Center and Halim Perdanakusuma Airport)
- Intersection of Otista (towards Jatinegara and Kalibata Hero Cemetery)
- Intersection of North South Tower Green (towards Tebet and Pengadegan)
- North Intersection (towards Tebet)
- Junction of Pancoran Statue (towards Casablanca and Kalibata Hero Cemetery)

== Transportation ==
This road is passed by TransJakarta corridor 9 and 7. It is also served by APTB, Mayasari Bakti and Kopaja buses. Cawang station of Jakarta Commjuter Rail located on this road.

== See also ==
- History of Jakarta
