= Jakarta Bypass =

Bypass road in Jakarta, Indonesia

Cililitan-Tanjung Priok Road
- Jalan Raya Cililitan-Tanjung Priok
- Jakarta Bypass
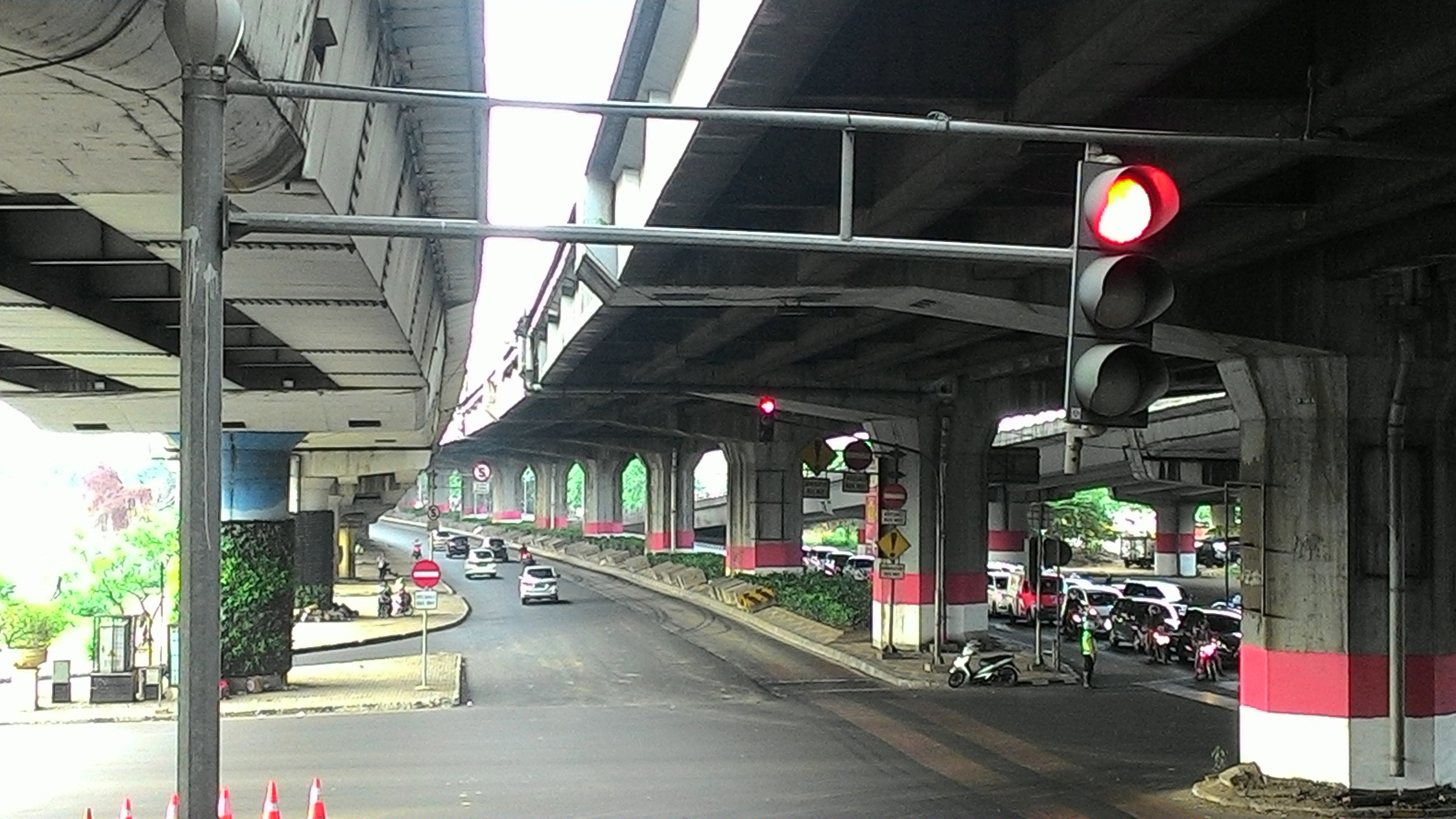
- The Pemuda Road and Pramuka Road intersection, one of the intersections of the Jakarta Bypass

Route information
- Length: 17 mi (27 km)
- Existed: October 21, 1963–present

Major junctions
- Cililitan; Cawang; Kalimalang; Kampung Melayu/Basuki Rahmat; Jatinegara Overpass; Utan Kayu; Pemuda/ Pramuka; Kayu Putih; Cempaka Putih; Kelapa Gading

Location
- Country: Indonesia
- Major cities: East Jakarta, Central Jakarta, North Jakarta

Highway system
- Transport in Indonesia

The Cililitan-Tanjung Priok Road (Indonesian: Jalan Raya Cililitan-Tanjung Priok), also known as the Jakarta Bypass (old spelling: Djakarta Bypass) or simply Bypass, is a 27 km (17 mile) long bypass road in Jakarta, Indonesia that connects the Dewi Sartika Road and the Bogor Main Road (Jalan Raya Bogor, which is one of the sections of the Great Post Road/Jalan Raya Pos) in Cililitan, East Jakarta to the Port of Tanjung Priok in North Jakarta. The road is divided into four parts: Jalan Mayjen Sutoyo Road, Jalan D.I. Panjaitan, Jalan Jend. Ahmad Yani Road, and Jalan Laksamana Yos Sudarso. The bypass was inaugurated by the first President of Indonesia, Sukarno on October 21, 1963. One of the Jakarta Inner Ring Road sections is built over the road.

The road purpose is to expedite travel from Tanjung Priok to the centre of Jakarta. It was the benchmark of the city's development in the east. It had an important role for creating the west–east axis roads of the city that had been dominated by north–south axis roads.

== History ==
=== Background ===
The construction of the Jakarta Bypass was one of the plans created by Sukarno, the first president of Indonesia, to redevelop Jakarta as a "beacon" of a powerful new nation of Indonesia. These plans were part of Jakarta's preparations for the 1962 Asian Games.

The 1962 Asian Games preparation also involved diplomatic relationships with the Soviet Union and Japan, where the Soviets helped with the construction of the Gelora Bung Karno Main Stadium and the Japanese helped with the construction of Hotel Indonesia as the accommodation for invited guests during the games. After the Soviet Union and Japan, the Indonesian government asked the United States for assistance with the construction of the Asian Games infrastructure.

At that time, the diplomatic relationship between Indonesia and the U.S. was less harmonious, due to the accusations that the US had provided assistance to the Revolutionary Government of the Republic of Indonesia (PRRI), which opposed the central government. The accusations were based on the capture of Allen Pope, the American pilot of a B-26 aircraft that had carried out an attack in Maluku in 1958.

Eventually, the Indonesian government agreed to release Allen Pope after negotiating with the U.S. During the negotiations, the U.S. government offered aid to build a 27 km length highway connecting the port of Tanjung Priok, Halim Perdanakusuma International Airport, and the regions of Cililitan and Cawang. This proposed highway became the first stage of the Jakarta Bypass.

=== Construction ===
The Construction was started in the early 1960s and finished in late 1963. During the construction, the Jakarta Bypass was used as the route for vehicles carrying materialsfor the construction of the Gelora Bung Karno Main Stadium from the port of Tanjung Priok. In 1962, the bypass was used as the track for the marathon and cycling races during the 1962 Asian Games.

=== Inauguration ===
The inauguration ceremony of the Jakarta Bypass was held on October 21, 1963. The inauguration was attended by Sukarno, the U.S. ambassador to Indonesia Howard P. Jones, the Governor of Jakarta Soemarno Sosroatmodjo, and the representatives of several countries, as well as the Jakartan people. At that time, Sukarno gave a speech, cut the ribbon to inaugurate Jakarta Bypass, and inspected the new highway.

== Parts ==
The Jakarta Bypass is divided into four parts. Three of them are named after the people killed by the presidential guard in the 1965 coup attempt. These are:

- Jalan Mayjen Sutoyo, from Cililitan junction to Cawang.
- Jalan D.I. Panjaitan, from Cawang junction to the Jatinegara overpass.
- Jalan Jenderal Ahmad Yani, from Jatinegara overpass to the Kelapa Gading junction.
- Jalan Yos Sudarso Road, from Kelapa Gading junction to the port of Tanjung Priok.

Administratively, this road passes the regions of:

- East Jakarta Administrative City
  - Kramat Jati district
    - Cililitan Sub-district
    - Cawang Sub-district
  - Jatinegara district
    - Bidara Cina Sub- district
    - Cipinang Cependak Sub- district
    - Rawa Bunga Sub-district
    - Bali Mester Sub-district
  - Matraman district
    - Pisangan Baru Sub-district
    - Kayu Manis Sub-district
    - Utan Kayu Selatan Sub- district
    - Utan Kayu Utara Sub-district
  - Pulo Gadung district
    - Pisangan Timur Sub-district
    - RawamangunSub- district
    - Kayu Putih Sub-district
- Central Jakarta Administrative City
  - Cempaka Putih District
    - Rawasari Sub- district
    - Cempaka Putih Sub- district
  - Kemayoran District
    - Sumur Batu Sub-district
- North Jakarta Administrative City
  - Kelapa Gading district
    - Kelapa Gading Barat Sub-district
  - Koja District
    - Rawa Badak Selatan Sub-district
    - Rawa Badak Utara Sub-district
  - Tanjung Priok District
    - Sunter Jaya Sub-district
    - Sungai Bambu Sub-district
    - Kebon Bawang Sub-district

== Transportation ==
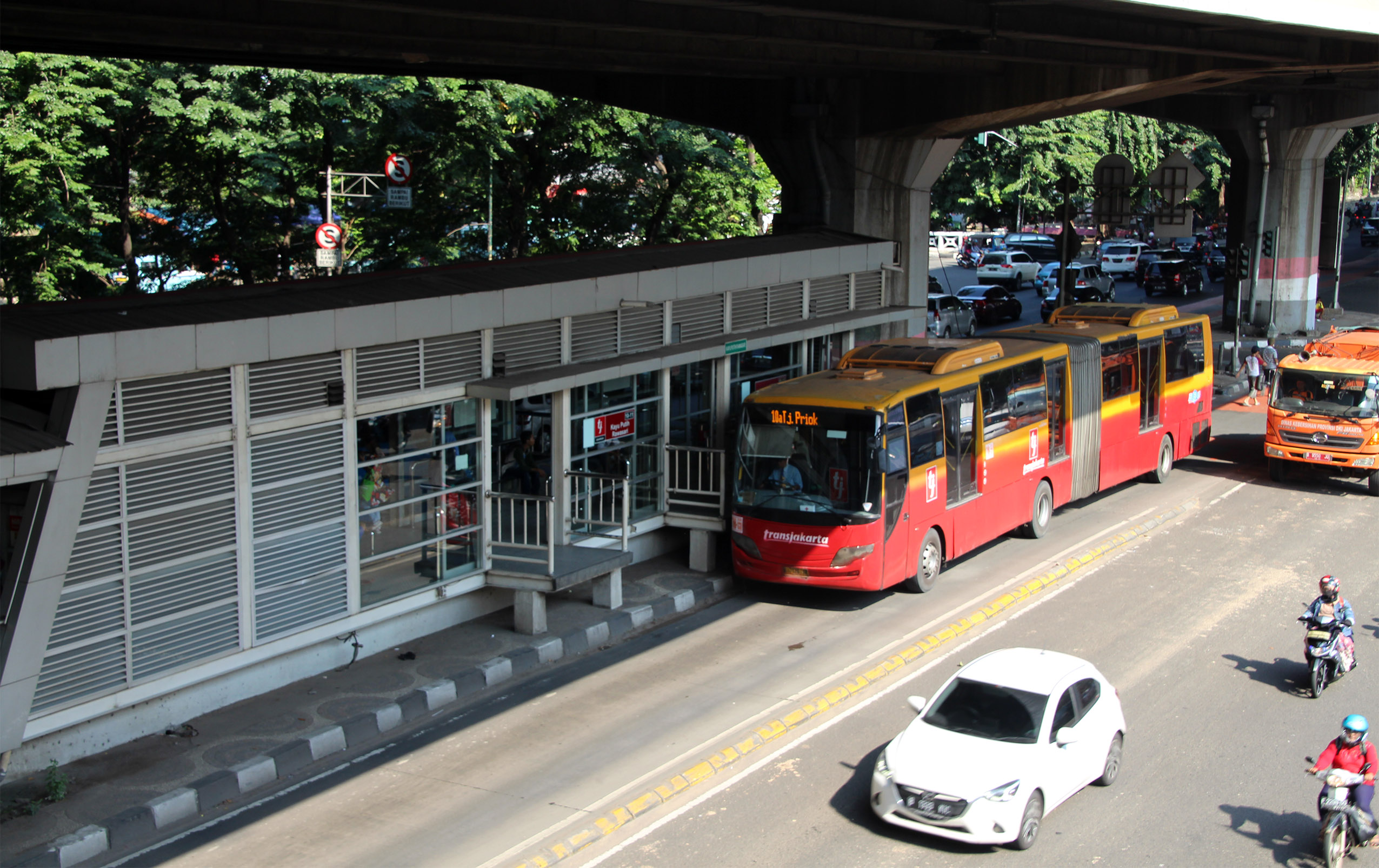
One of the bus routes that passes along h the Jakarta Bypass is the TransJakarta Corridor 10 (PGC 2-Tanjung Priok)

=== Bus routes ===
The Jakarta Bypass is part of Transjakarta Corridor 10. Other bus services like the APTB, Mayasari Bakti, MetroMini, and PPD are also use the Jakarta Bypass.

=== Toll roads ===
The Wiyoto Wiyono Elevated Toll Road is built above the bypass. The toll road has a length of 15 km from the Jagorawi Toll Road to the port of Tanjung Priok. The Ir. Wiyoto Wiyono Toll Road is one of the parts of the Jakarta Inner Ring Road network.

The Bekasi–Cawang–Kampung Melayu Toll Road from the Kampung Melayu/Basuki Rahmat junction towards west to the city of Bekasi, West Java is also part of the Bypass
