= Pinang Ranti (Transjakarta) =

Bus rapid transit station in Jakarta, Indonesia

9 01 Pinang Ranti
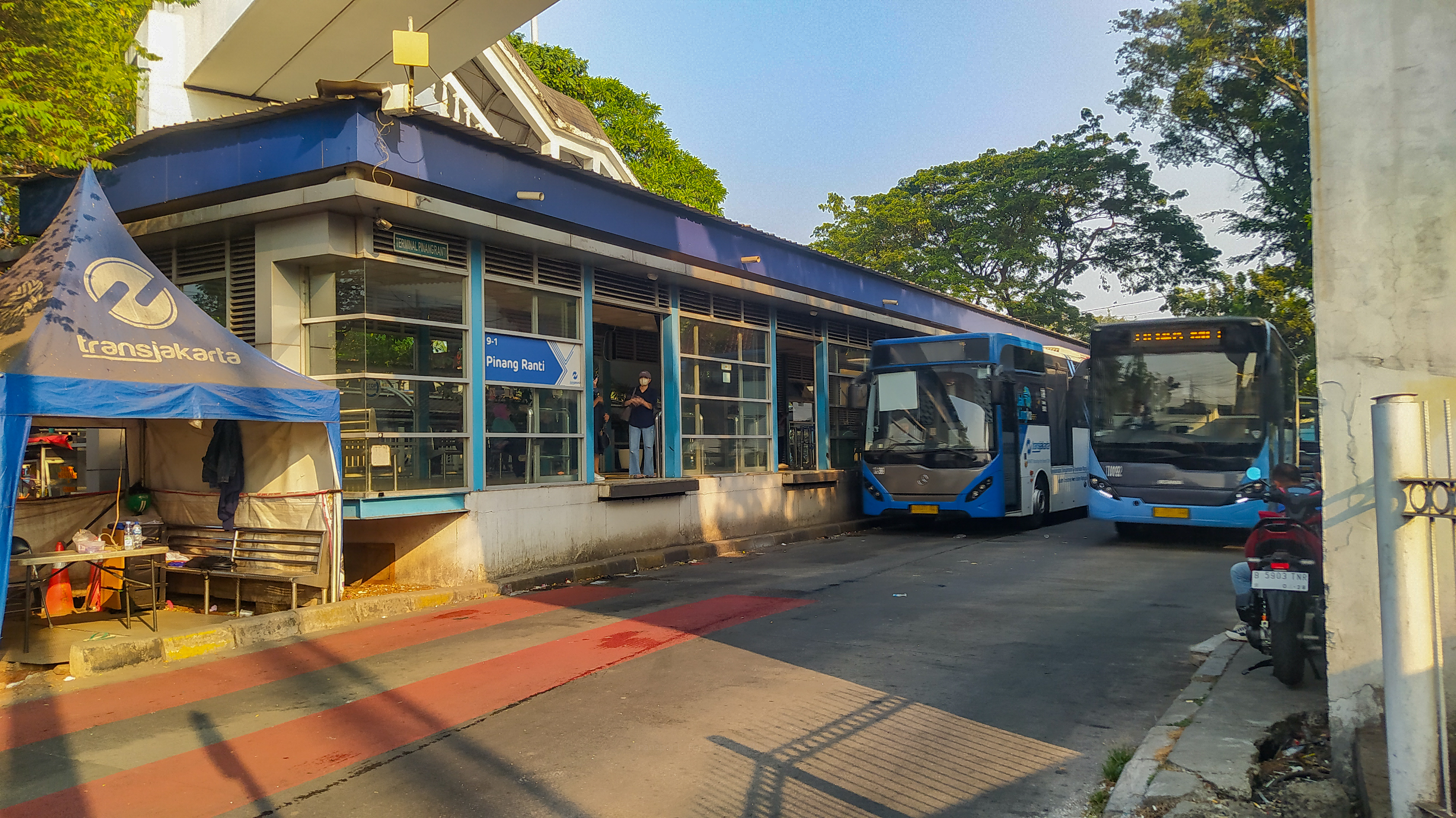

General information
- Location: Pondok Gede Street, Pinang Ranti, Makasar, East Jakarta 13560, Indonesia
- Coordinates: 6.291208°S 106.886471°E
- System: Transjakarta bus rapid transit station
- Owner: Transjakarta
- Operator: Transjakarta
- Lines: List of TransJakarta corridors#Corridor 9 List of TransJakarta corridors#Cross-corridor routes
- Platforms: Two side platforms with separate paid area per platform

Construction
- Structure type: At-grade

Other information
- Status: In service

History
- Opened: 31 December 2010

Services
Preceding		Following
Terminus	Corridor 9 Terminus	Makasar towards Pluit
Terminus	Corridor 9 Route 9C Terminus	Makasar towards Bundaran Senayan
Terminus	Corridor 9 Route 9N Terminus	Makasar towards Simpang Cawang
Location

Pinang Ranti is a Transjakarta bus rapid transit station located inside Pinang Ranti Bus Terminal, Makasar, East Jakarta, Indonesia. The station is the southeastern terminus of Corridor 9 and is one of the five on the line that has never had a name change since opening.

== History ==
Prior to 1998, the Pinang Ranti bus terminal had a direct 5 km-long road access to Taman Mini Indonesia Indah, which was closed since May 1998 Indonesia riots.

The BRT station alone opened on 31 December 2010 as the southeastern terminus of Corridor 9, which was built to support the 2011 SEA Games in Jakarta and Palembang. Corridor 9 itself is the longest main BRT line on the network.

On 28 May 2015, the bus terminal was reopened after a revitalization.

== Building and layout ==
Pinang Ranti BRT station comprises a single structure with departure and arrival platforms being separate, each with a separate paid area that requires transferring passengers to tap out and pay again.

North
	Side platform, doors open on the right	Unpaid link	Side platform, doors open on the right
South	towards Pluit, towards Bundaran Senayan, and towards Simpang Cawang		Arrivals

== Non-BRT bus services ==
Service type	Route	Destination	Notes
Inner city feeder		Pinang Ranti–Pulo Gadung	Outside the station
Mikrotrans Jak Lingko	JAK-19	Pinang Ranti–Kampung Rambutan	Outside the station
Mikrotrans Jak Lingko	JAK-71	Pinang Ranti–Kampung Rambutan via Setu	Outside the station

== Places nearby ==
- Taman Mini Indonesia Indah
- Pondok Gede Hajj Hostel
