= Kramat Jati, East Jakarta =

District in East Jakarta, Indonesia

Kramat Jati is a district (kecamatan) of East Jakarta, Indonesia. The boundaries of Kramat Jati are Jagorawi Toll Road to the east, Ciliwung to the west, and Jakarta-Cikampek Tollway to the north.

The Condet Area, known for its Betawi culture and agriculture, is located in Kramat Jati.

== Condet ==
Condet is an area in Kramat Jati which is roughly located in three kelurahan: Batu Ampar, Bale Kambang, and Kampung Tengah. The area is known for its fruit production and a small enclave for Betawi people, the indigenous people of Jakarta. Before 1965 most of the land in this area was used for agriculture and fruit orchards. As Jakarta started to grow, Condet became affected by the modern development, threatening the preservation of Betawi culture within the area.

The oldest written source about Condet is found in National Archives of the Republic of Indonesia. On April 25, 1716, Prince Aria Pourobaya made his will and bestowed upon his wife Ratoe Pourobaya "...ten big buffaloes walking on the land called Tsondet". In 1753, the area is known to be inhabited by Javanese and Makassarese. The owners of the land were Dain Matara, Prince Aria Pourobaya, Ratoe Pourobaya, and their families.

The Regeeringsalmanak (Annual Report of the Dutch East Indies) of 1927 mentions Condet as one of the private lands located in Meester Cornelis.

Condet currently is also the most populated place with the Arab Indonesians community, who many of them have moved from different places in Jakarta, replacing Pekojan or Tanah Abang.

It also known for its perfume stores throughout the street, mostly are concentrated around Al-Hawi mosque and owned mostly by Arabs.

== Kelurahan (administrative villages) ==
The district of Kramat Jati is divided into seven Kelurahan or Administrative Village:

- Kramat Jati - area code - 13510
- Batuampar - area code - 13520
- Balekambang - area code - 13530
- Kampung Tengah - area code - 13540
- Dukuh - area code - 13550
- Cawang - area code - 13630
- Cililitan - area code - 13640

== List of important places ==
- PTQ Al-Utsmani Condet
- Christian University of Indonesia
- Gardu Induk PLN Cawang
