= Cawang, Kramat Jati, East Jakarta =

Administrative Village in East Jakarta

Cawang
- Administrative Village
- Interactive map of Cawang
- Country: Indonesia
- Province: Special Capital Region of Jakarta
- Administrative city: East Jakarta
- District: Kramat Jati
- Time zone: +7
- Postal code: 13630

Cawang is an administrative village (kelurahan in Indonesian) at Kramat Jati subdistrict, East Jakarta. The borders of Cawang are:

- MT Haryono Road in the north
- Ciliwung River in the west
- General Sutoyo Road in the east
- Kalibata Road and 14th Public High School (SMA 14) Street in the south

The postal code of this administrative village is 13630.

== Toponym ==
The name Cawang derived from the name of a Malay lieutenant who served the Dutch, called Encik Awang. The name of Enci Awang eventually turned into Cawang. Awang was subordinate of Lieutenant Captain Encik Wan Abdul Bagus, who along with his team lived in the area now known as Kampung Melayu, south of Jatinegara. According another sources, Cawang name originated from Cai Wang Hui (蔡汪惠), a Chinese merchant who escaped from the Batavia massacre which that time took place in Batavia city centre and built his residence there which would become known as Cawang like today.
