= Klender Baru railway station =

Railway station in Indonesia

C18 Klender Baru Station Stasiun Klender Baru
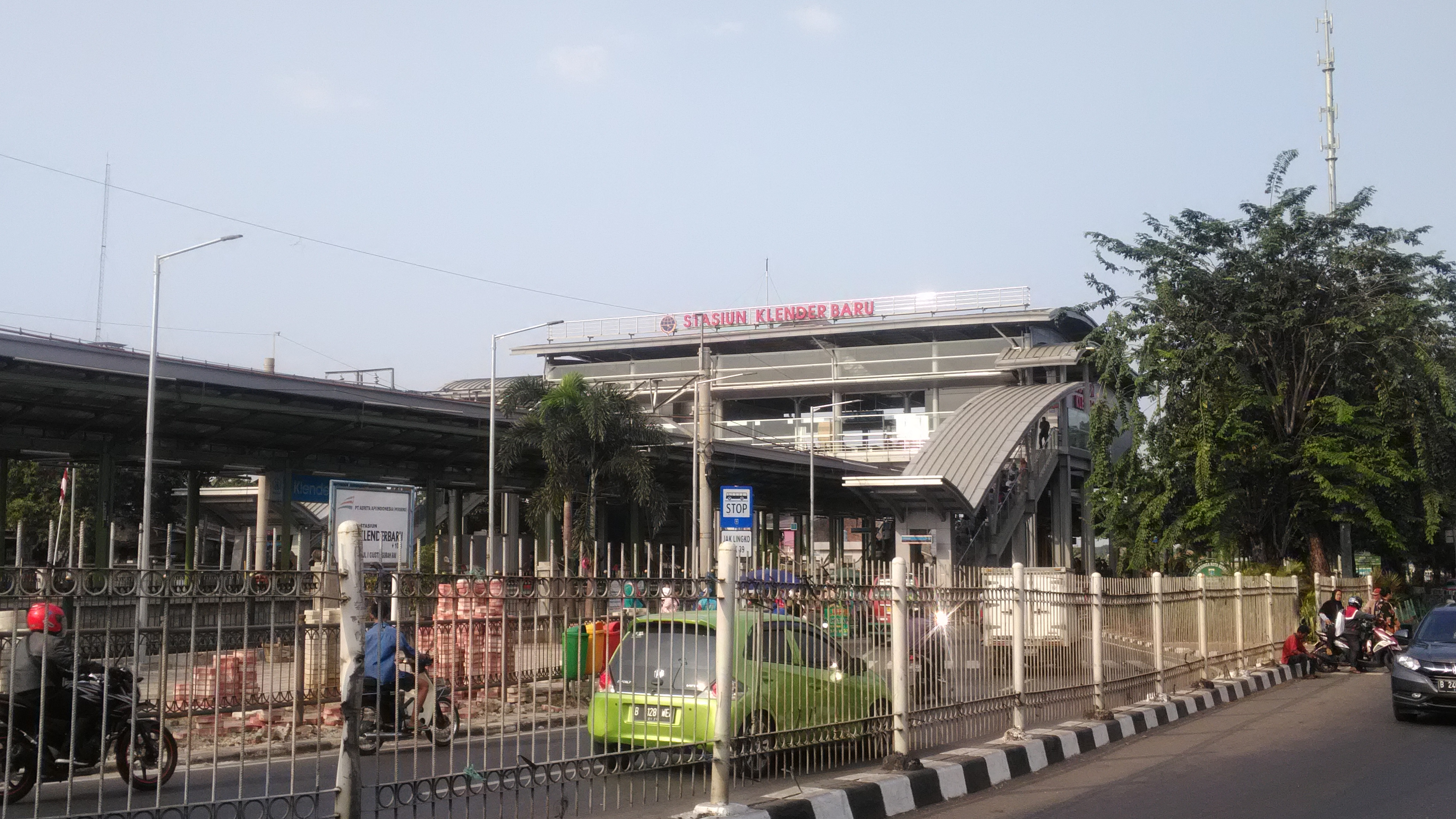
- New building of Klender Baru station, as of 2019

General information
- Location: Jl. Pondok Kopi Timur, Penggilingan, Cakung, East Jakarta; Jakarta; Indonesia
- Coordinates: 6.2176471°S 106.9401219°E
- Elevation: +11 m (36 ft)
- Owner: Kereta Api Indonesia
- Operator: KAI Commuter
- Lines: Rajawali–Cikampek railway; Cikarang Loop Line
- Platforms: 1 island platform
- Tracks: 2
- Connections: Penggilingan

Construction
- Structure type: Ground
- Parking: Available
- Accessible: Available

Other information
- Station code: KLDB
- Classification: Class III

History
- Rebuilt: 2017

Services
Preceding station		Following station
Buaran towards Angke, Kampung Bandan or Jakarta Kota	Commuter Line Cikarang	Cakung towards Bekasi or Cikarang
Location
- Location within Jakarta

Klender Baru Station (KLDB) is a class III railway station located in Penggilingan, Cakung, East Jakarta. The station, which is located at an altitude of +11 meters, is included in the Operation Area I Jakarta and only serves the KRL Commuterline route. This station now has four railway tracks.

This station is also called Pondok Kopi Station because of its location at the north of Pondok Kopi urban village (Kelurahan), although this station is not located at the Pondok Kopi kelurahan administratively.

== Building and layout ==
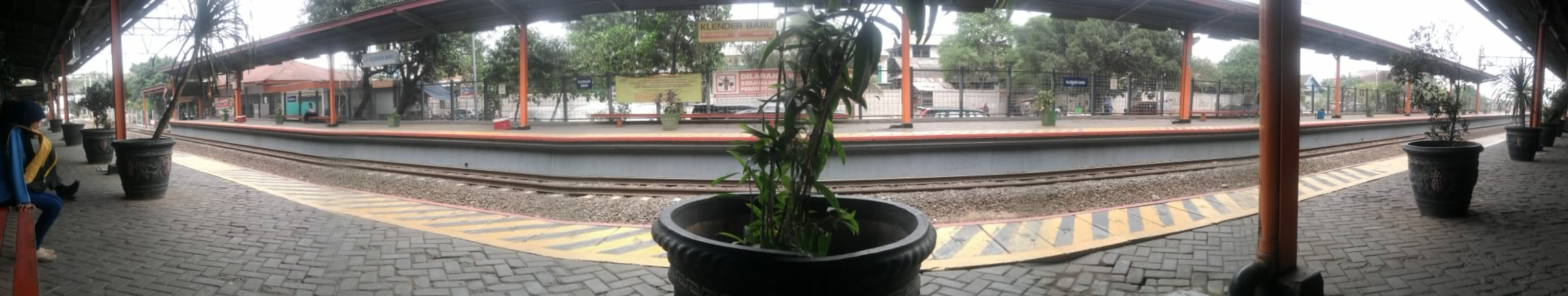
The old building of Klender Baru Station.

The station now has four railway lines.

Since 13 December 2018, this station, along with four other railway stations on the Jakarta–Cikarang (Klender, Cakung, Kranji, and Buaran), have used a new building with a futuristic modern minimalist architecture which is located slightly to the east of the old building. This relocation changed the layout of the railway track, which was originally flanked by two side platforms into one island platform between the two tracks.

C18
1st floor	Concourse, ticket counter, ticket gates
Platform floor	Straight tracks for long-distance train to Jatinegara
Platform floor	Straight tracks for long-distance train to Cikarang
Platform floor	Line 2	← (Buaran) Cikarang Loop Line towards Jatinegara loop
Platform floor	Island platform
Platform floor	Line 1	Cikarang Loop Line to Cikarang (Cakung) →

== Services ==
The following is a list of train services at the Klender Baru Station.

=== Passenger services ===
- KAI Commuter
  - Cikarang Loop Line (Full Racket)
    - to Cikarang (direct service)
    - to Cikarang (looping through Manggarai-Kampung Bandan-Pasar Senen and vice versa)
  - Cikarang Loop Line (Half Racket), to Angke/Kampung Bandan (via Tanah Abang and Duri) and Cikarang

== Supporting transportation ==
Public transport type	Line	Line	Destination
TransJakarta	Penggilingan	List of TransJakarta corridors#Corridor 11	Kampung Melayu–Pulo Gebang
TransJakarta	N/A	2E (MiniTrans)	Rusun Rawa Bebek-Pakin
TransJakarta	N/A	11A (MetroTrans)	Layur-Pulo Gebang
TransJakarta	N/A	11B (MiniTrans)	Rusun Rawa Bebek-Penggilingan
TransJakarta	N/A	11C (MiniTrans)	Rusun Pinus Elok-Rusun Pulo Gebang
TransJakarta	N/A	11D (MiniTrans)	Pulo Gadung 1-Pulo Gebang (via Penggilingan)
TransJakarta	N/A	11K (MiniTrans)	Rusun Komarudin-Penggilingan
TransJakarta	N/A	11M (MiniTrans)	Rusun Rawa Bebek-Bukit Duri
TransJakarta	N/A	11P (MiniTrans)	Rusun Pondok Bambu-Walikota Jakarta Timur
TransJakarta	N/A	11Q (MetroTrans)	Kampung Melayu-Pulo Gebang (via Kolonel Soegiono, Basuki Rachmat)
TransJakarta	N/A	11R (MiniTrans)	Rusun Cakung-Bukit Duri
TransJakarta	N/A	11T (MiniTrans)	Cakung Station-Pulo Gebang Terminal (via Dr. Sunarmo)
TransJakarta	N/A	11U (MiniTrans)	Cakung Station-Pulo Gebang Terminal (via Cakung Cilincing)
TransJakarta	N/A	JAK 39 (Mikrotrans Jak Lingko)	Duren Sawit-Pondok Kelapa
MetroMini	N/A	506	Kampung Melayu Terminal-Pulo Gebang Terminal
MetroMini	N/A	47	Pulo Gebang Terminal–Senen
Koperasi Wahana Kalpika (KWK)	N/A	T25	Pulo Gebang Terminal-Rawamangun Terminal
Koperasi Angkutan Bekasi (Koasi)	N/A	K20	Klender Terminal-Bintara Jaya
Koperasi Angkutan Bekasi (Koasi)	N/A	K22A	Pulo Gebang Terminal–Pondok Gede

== Gallery ==
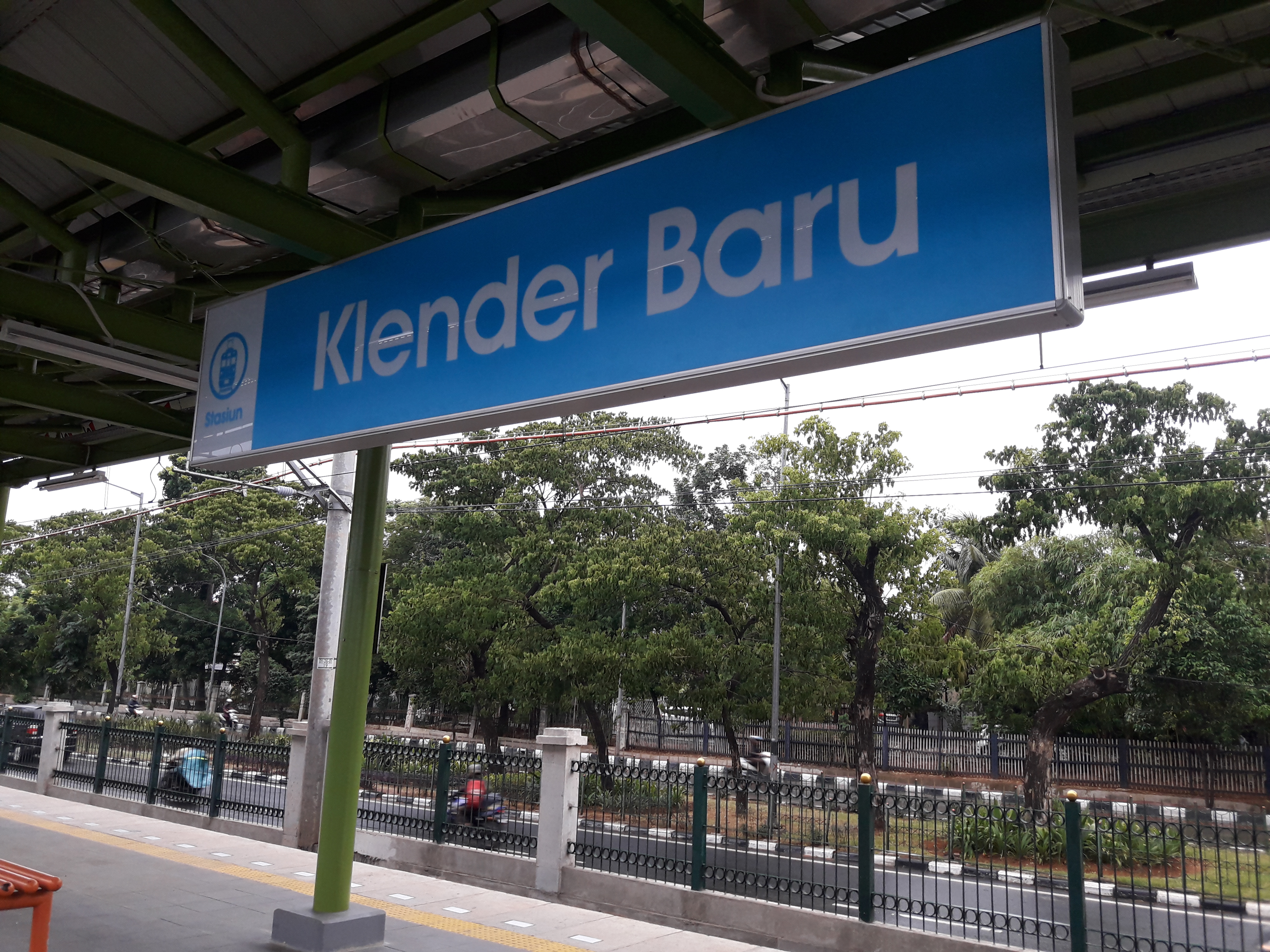
The station signage as of 2019

Preceding station	Kereta Api Indonesia	Following station
Buaran towards Rajawali	Rajawali–Cikampek	Cakung towards Cikampek
