= Cakung railway station =

Railway station in Indonesia

C19 Cakung Station Stasiun Cakung
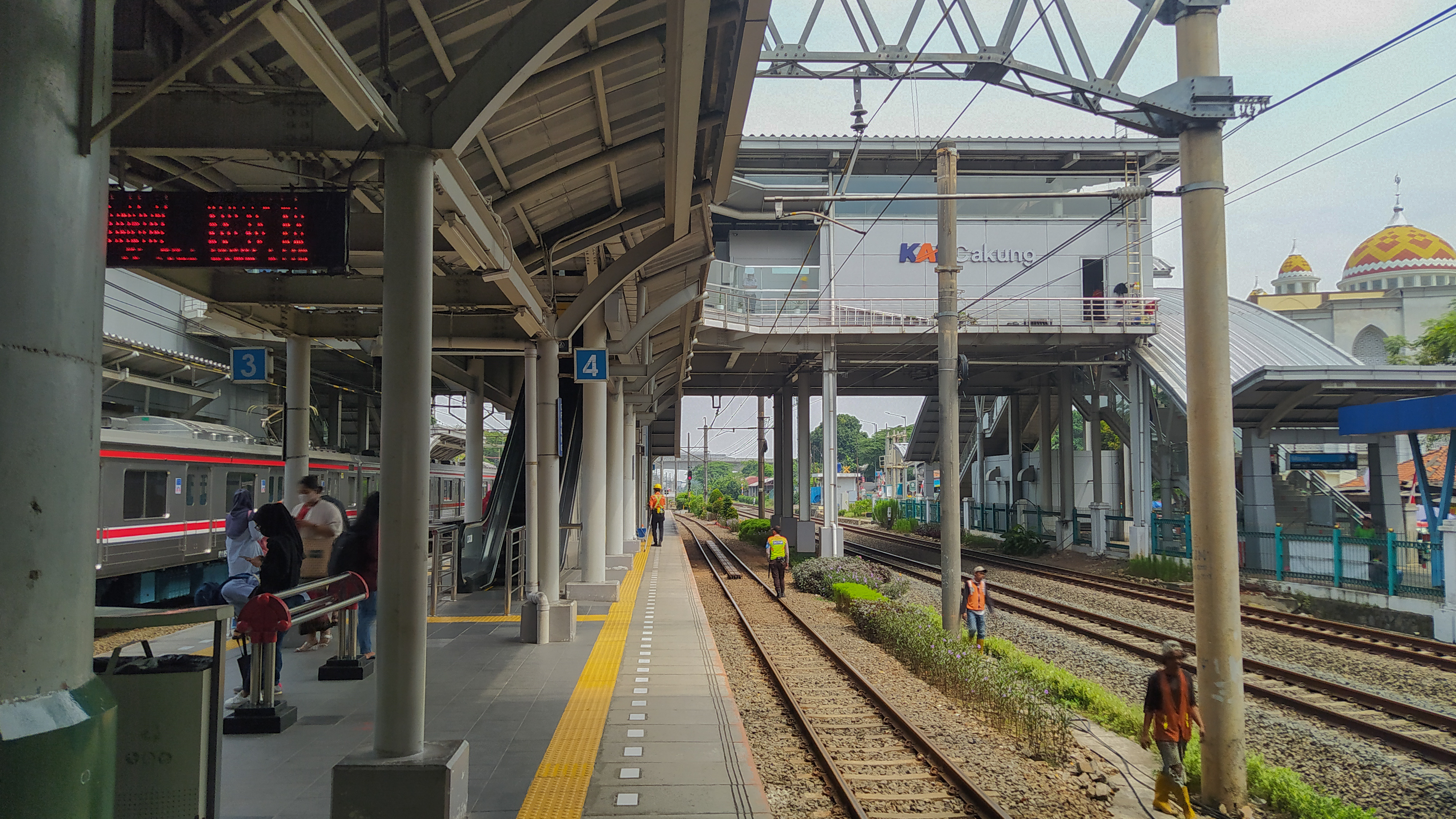
- The new building and platform of Cakung Station, as of 2022

General information
- Location: Jl. Stasiun Cakung, Pulogebang, Cakung, East Jakarta; Jakarta; Indonesia
- Coordinates: 6.2191224°S 106.9523612°E
- Elevation: +11 m (36 ft)
- Owner: Kereta Api Indonesia
- Operator: KAI Commuter
- Lines: Rajawali–Cikampek railway; Cikarang Loop Line
- Platforms: 2 island platforms
- Tracks: 6

Construction
- Structure type: Ground
- Parking: Available
- Accessible: Available

Other information
- Station code: CUK • 0502
- Classification: Class I

History
- Rebuilt: 2017

Services
Preceding station		Following station
Klender Baru towards Angke, Kampung Bandan or Jakarta Kota	Cikarang Commuter Line	Kranji towards Bekasi or Cikarang
Location
- Location within Jakarta

Cakung Station (CUK) is a class I railway station in Pulogebang, Cakung, East Jakarta. The station, which is located at an altitude of +18 m, is included in the Jakarta Operational Area I and only serves the KRL Commuterline route. The station has a total of six railway tracks.

The station straddles the border of Jakarta and West Java, even the south and east sides after being extended are administratively located in Bintara, West Bekasi, Bekasi, West Java. Despite this, the station's entrance still lies within the borders of Jakarta, and therefore is stated as part of Jakarta. Cakung is the easternmost station in Jakarta. This station is also a busy station with a very large number of passengers in the morning and evening during rush hour.

To the east of this station, before Kranji Station, there is the former Rawabebek Station location which is no longer active due to minimal occupancy.

== Building and layout ==
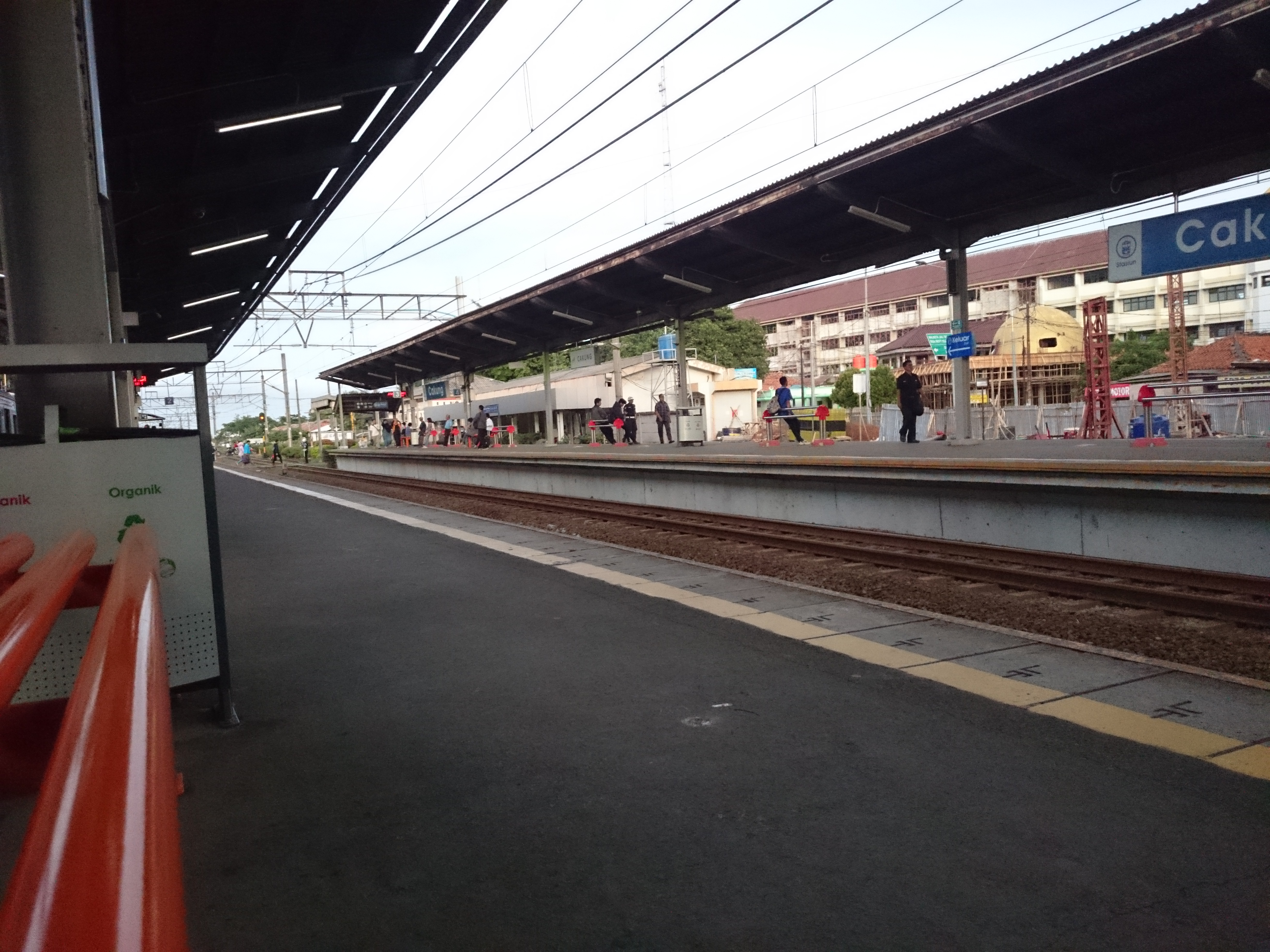
The old building and platform of Cakung Station (2016)

Initially, the station had four railway lines with lines 2 and 3 being straight tracks. After the Jatinegara–Cakung quadruple-track railway section was officially operated in 2019, the number of lines has increased to six with lines 5 and 6 being new straight tracks specifically for non-KRL trains. Lines 5 and 6 are equipped with a quadruple-track railway end switch on the east side of the station embankment. Then, after the Cakung–Bekasi quadruple-track railway section was officially operated on mid-December 2022, the railroad switch was completely dismantled so that now the two lines are straight lines without being connected with railroad switch at all.

Since 9 October 2018, this station has used a new building with a futuristic minimalist modern architecture which is located a little to the east of the old building. The relocation did not change the layout of the railway track at all.

In 2021, an overpass was built next to 6 railway tracks near Cakung Station to replace a level crossing which has been permanently closed. The currently closed level crossing was a connector between the I Gusti Ngurah Rai street at the south of the Cakung Station and the Pulo Gebang Raya street, that connects the station to Penggilingan which already exist since 1902.

C19
1
Main building
G
North departure gate
UG

Inter-platform crossing

Line 6
Straight tracks for long-distance train to Jatinegara
Line 5
Straight tracks for long-distance train to Cikarang
Line 4
← (Klender Baru) Cikarang Loop Line towards Jatinegara loop
Island platform
Line 3
← (Klender Baru) Cikarang Loop Line towards Jatinegara loop
Line 2
Cikarang Loop Line to Cikarang (Kranji) →
Island platform
Line 1
Cikarang Loop Line to Cikarang (Kranji) →
G
South departure gate

== Services ==
The following is a list of train services at the Cakung Station.

=== Passenger services ===
- KAI Commuter
  - Cikarang Loop Line (Full Racket)
    - to Cikarang (direct service)
    - to Cikarang (looping through Manggarai-Kampung Bandan-Pasar Senen and vice versa)
  - Cikarang Loop Line (Half Racket), to Angke/Kampung Bandan (via Tanah Abang and Duri) and Cikarang

== Supporting transportation ==
Public transport type	Line	Destination
TransJakarta	11T	Cakung Station–Pulo Gebang Bus Terminal (via Penggilingan)
TransJakarta	11U	Cakung Station–Pulo Gebang Bus Terminal (via Cakung Cilincing)
MetroMini	52	Pulo Gebang Terminal-Kampung Melayu Terminal
Koperasi Wahana Kalpika (KWK)	T25	Pulo Gebang Terminal-Rawamangun Terminal
Koperasi Angkutan Bekasi (Koasi)	K03	Klender Terminal-Kranji Station

== Gallery ==
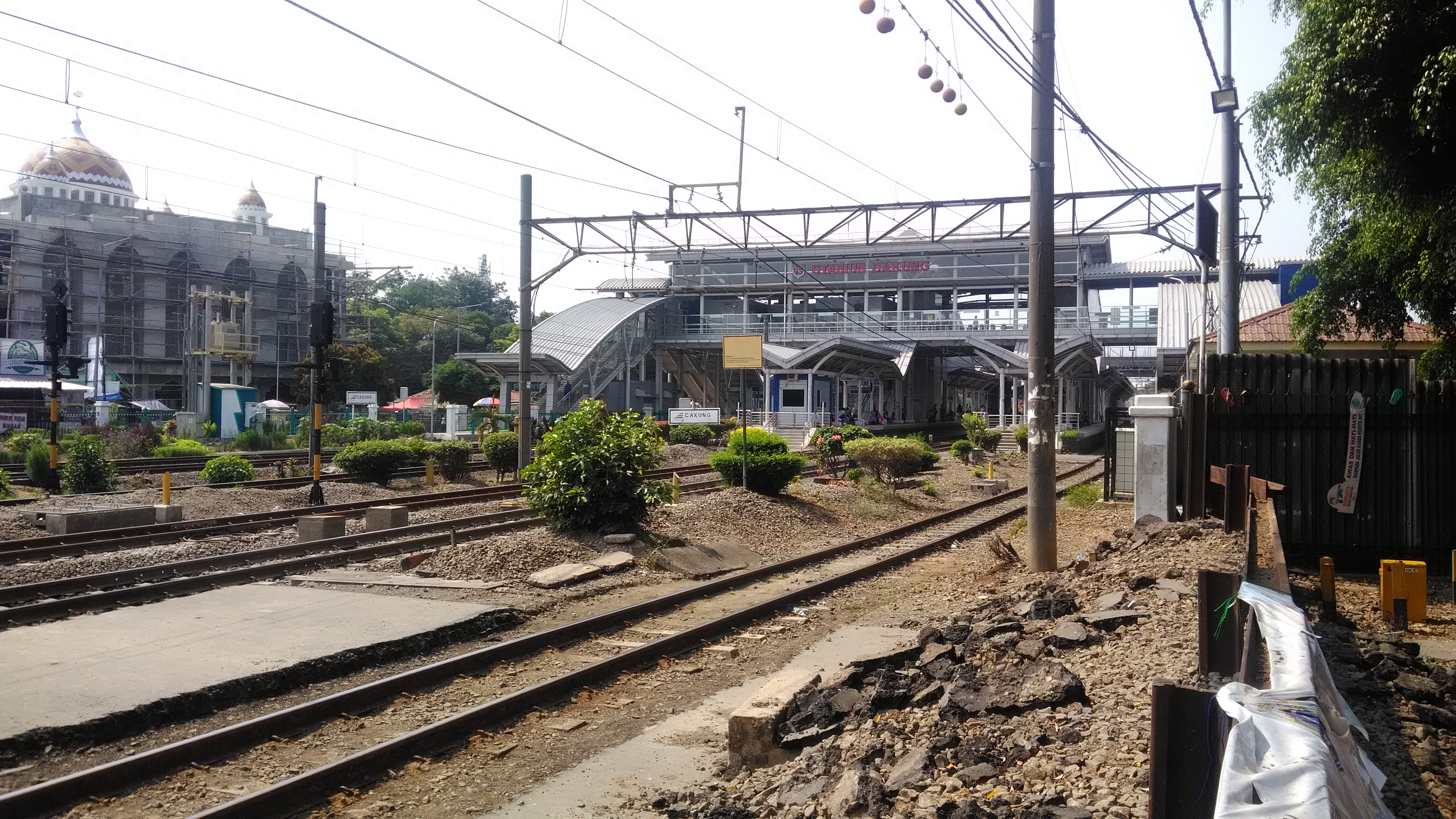
The emplacement and new building of Cakung Station (2019)

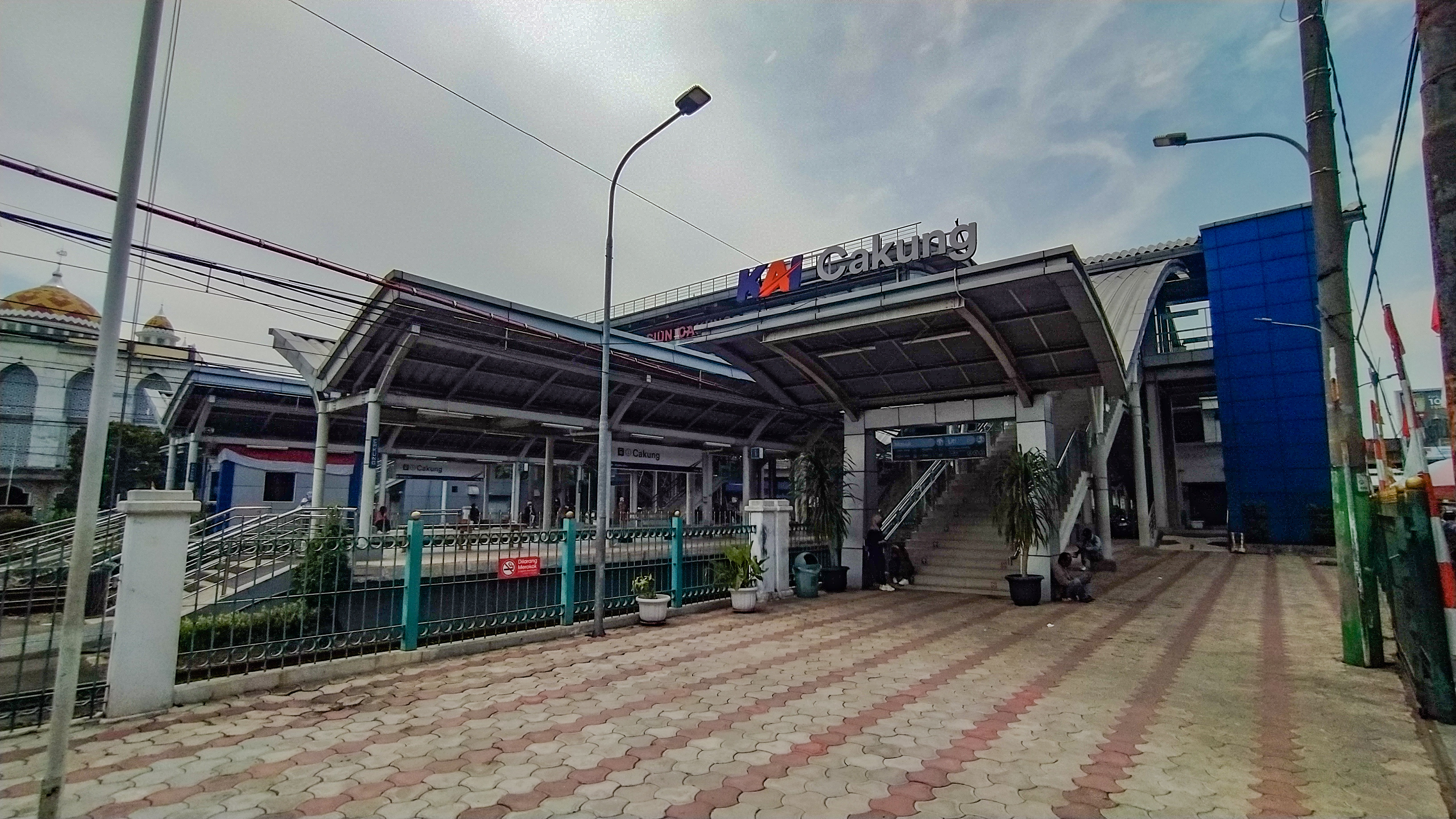
The south entrance of Cakung Station (2022)

Preceding station	Kereta Api Indonesia	Following station
Klender Baru towards Rajawali	Rajawali–Cikampek	Kranji towards Cikampek
