= Buaran railway station =

Railway station in Indonesia

C17 Buaran Station Stasiun Buaran
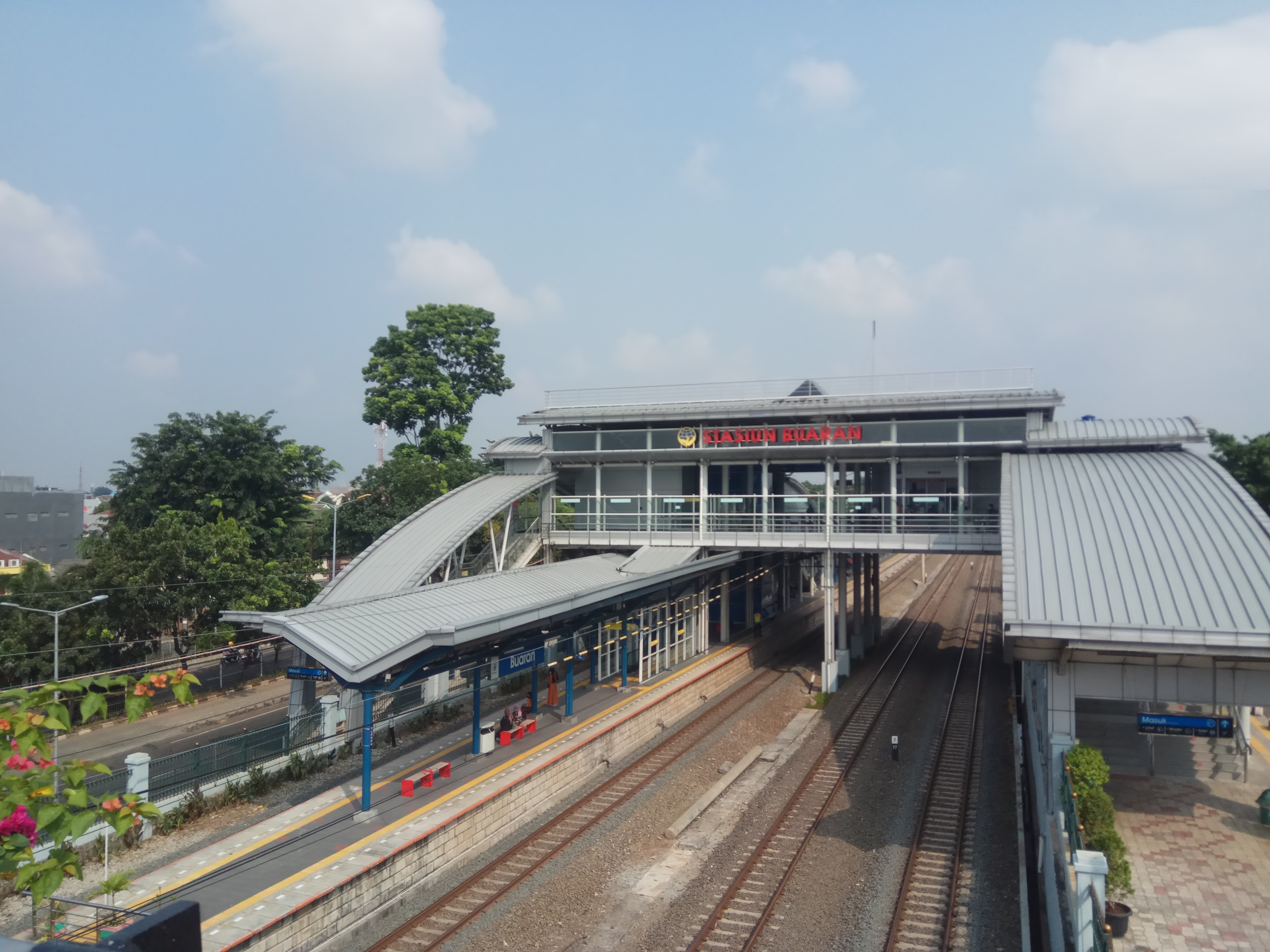
- Buaran Station

General information
- Location: Jl. I Gusti Ngurah Rai, Jatinegara, Cakung, East Jakarta; Jakarta; Indonesia
- Coordinates: 6.215583°S 106.923215°E
- Elevation: +11 m (36 ft)
- Owner: Kereta Api Indonesia
- Operator: KAI Commuter
- Lines: Rajawali–Cikampek railway; Cikarang Loop Line
- Platforms: 1 island platform
- Tracks: 4
- Connections: Simpang Buaran

Construction
- Structure type: Ground
- Parking: Available
- Accessible: Available

Other information
- Station code: BUA
- Classification: Class III

History
- Rebuilt: 2017–9 November 2018

Services
Preceding station		Following station
Klender towards Angke, Kampung Bandan or Jakarta Kota	Commuter Line Cikarang	Klender Baru towards Bekasi or Cikarang
Location
- Location within Jakarta

Buaran Station (BUA) is a class III railway station located in Jatinegara, Cakung, East Jakarta. The station, which is located at an altitude of +11 m, is included in the Jakarta Operational Area I and only serves the KRL Commuterline route.

== Building and layout ==
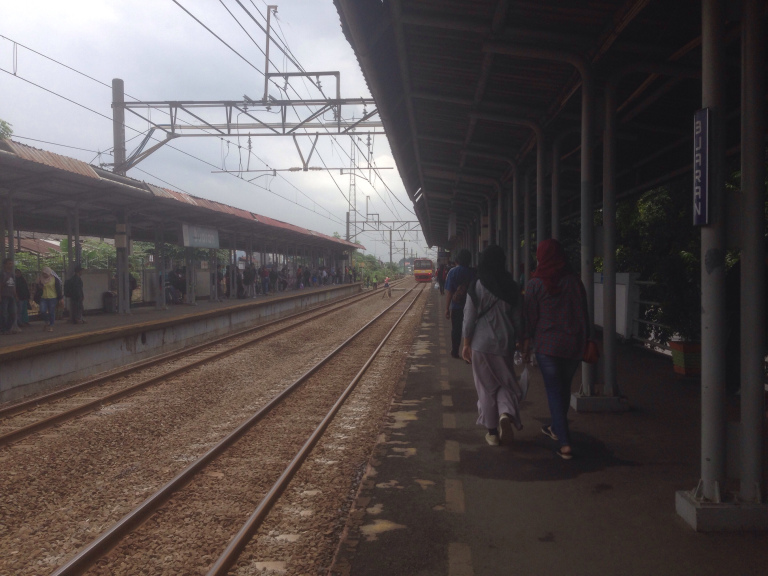
The old building of Buaran Station.

This station has 4 railway tracks.

Since 9 November 2018, this station has used a new building with a futuristic minimalist modern architecture which is located some distance to the west of the old building, to be precise to the west of the Jl. dr. Radjiman Wedyodiningrat. This new station is integrated with the Flyover Raden Inten TransJakarta bus station which serves corridor 11. This relocation changed the layout of the railway track, which was originally flanked by two side platforms into one island platform between the two tracks.

C17
1st floor	Concourse, ticket counter, ticket gates
Platform floor	Straight tracks for long-distance train to Jatinegara
Platform floor	Straight tracks for long-distance train to Cikarang
Platform floor	Line 2	← (Klender) Cikarang Loop Line towards Jatinegara loop
Platform floor	Island platform
Platform floor	Line 1	Cikarang Loop Line to Cikarang (Klender Baru) →

== Services ==
The following is a list of train services at the Buaran Station.

=== Passenger services ===
- KAI Commuter
  - Cikarang Loop Line (Full Racket)
    - to Cikarang (direct service)
    - to Cikarang (looping through Manggarai-Kampung Bandan-Pasar Senen and vice versa)
  - Cikarang Loop Line (Half Racket), to Angke/Kampung Bandan (via Tanah Abang and Duri) and Cikarang

== Supporting transportation ==
Type	Station	Route	Destination
TransJakarta	Simpang Buaran	List of TransJakarta corridors#Corridor 11	Pulogebang–Kampung Melayu
TransJakarta	N/A	2F (non-BRT)	Pulogadung–Rusun Cakung Barat (Albo)
TransJakarta	Simpang Buaran	11A (non-BRT)	Layur–Pulogebang
TransJakarta	Simpang Buaran	11M (non-BRT)	Rusun Rawa Bebek–Bukit Duri
TransJakarta	Simpang Buaran	11P (non-BRT)	Rusun Pondok Bambu–Walikota Jakarta Timur (East Jakarta City Hall)
TransJakarta	Simpang Buaran	11Q (non-BRT)	Kampung Melayu–Pulogebang (via East Flood Canal)
TransJakarta	Simpang Buaran	11R (non-BRT)	Rusun Cakung–Bukit Duri
TransJakarta	N/A	JAK-33 (MikroTrans Jak Lingko)	Duren Sawit–Rusun Klapa Village
Angkot (share taxis)	N/A	T25	Rawamangun Bus Terminal–Pulogebang Bus Terminal
Angkot (share taxis)	N/A	T26	Rawamangun Bus Terminal–Pondok Kelapa
Angkot (share taxis)	N/A	K22A	Pulogebang Bus Terminal–Pondok Gede, Bekasi

== Gallery ==
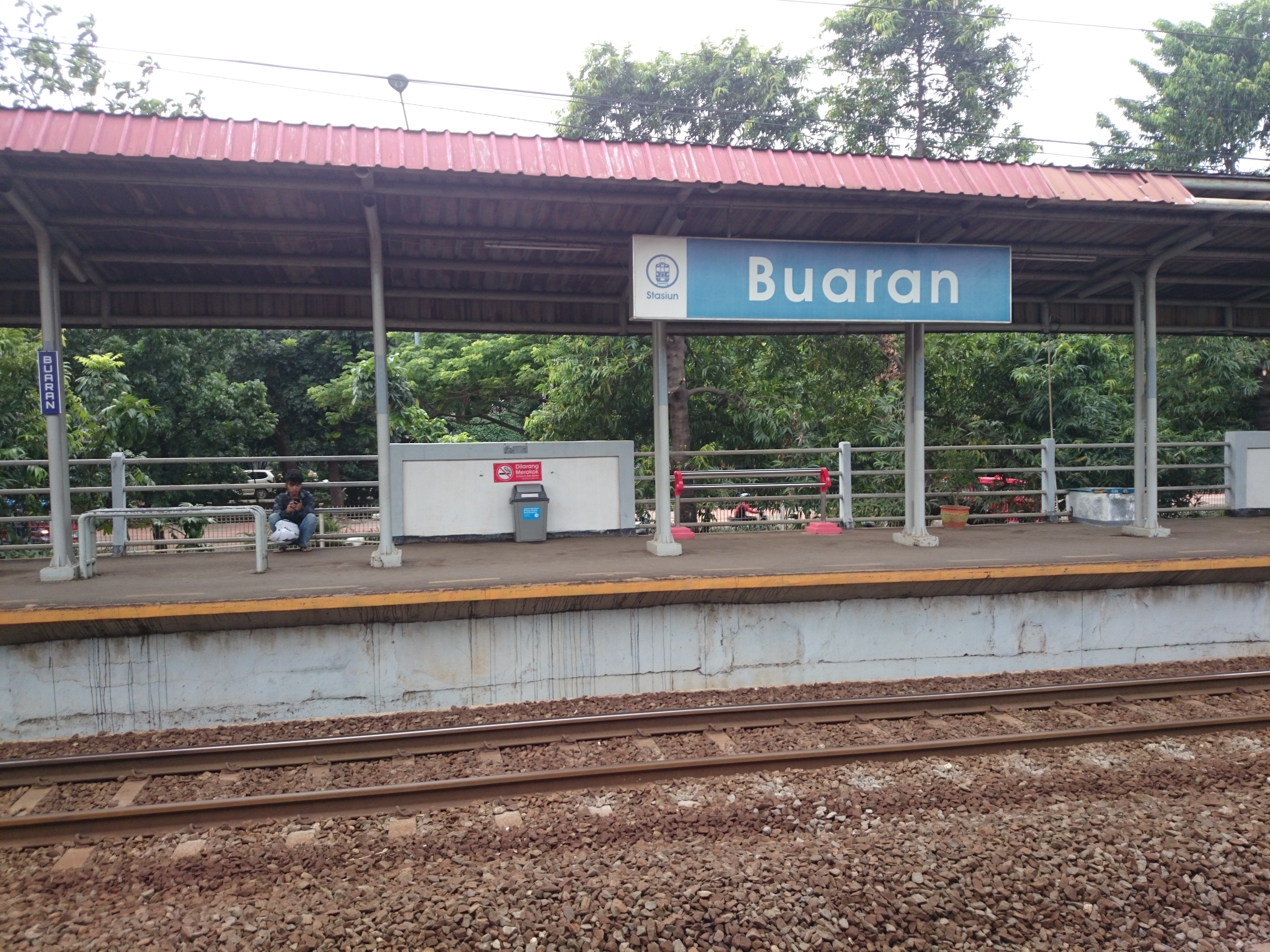
The signage at the old station platform prior to renovation

Preceding station	Kereta Api Indonesia	Following station
Klender towards Rajawali	Rajawali–Cikampek	Klender Baru towards Cikampek
