= J-Sky =

Coordinates: 6.143313°S 106.947265°E

- Interactive map of the J-Sky area

General information
- Type: Ferris wheel
- Location: Jakarta

Height
- Height: 69 m (226 ft)

Other information
- Seating capacity: 32 capsules, each able to carry 6 passengers

J-Sky is a Ferris wheel at Jakarta Garden City in Cakung, Jakarta, Indonesia. It has an overall height of 69 metres (226 ft) and is the tallest wheel in Indonesia. It is located on AEON Mall, Cakung, East Jakarta.

J-Sky has 32 air-conditioned passenger capsules, each able to carry up to 6 people.
