= Klender railway station =

Railway station in Indonesia

C16 Klender Station Stasiun Klender
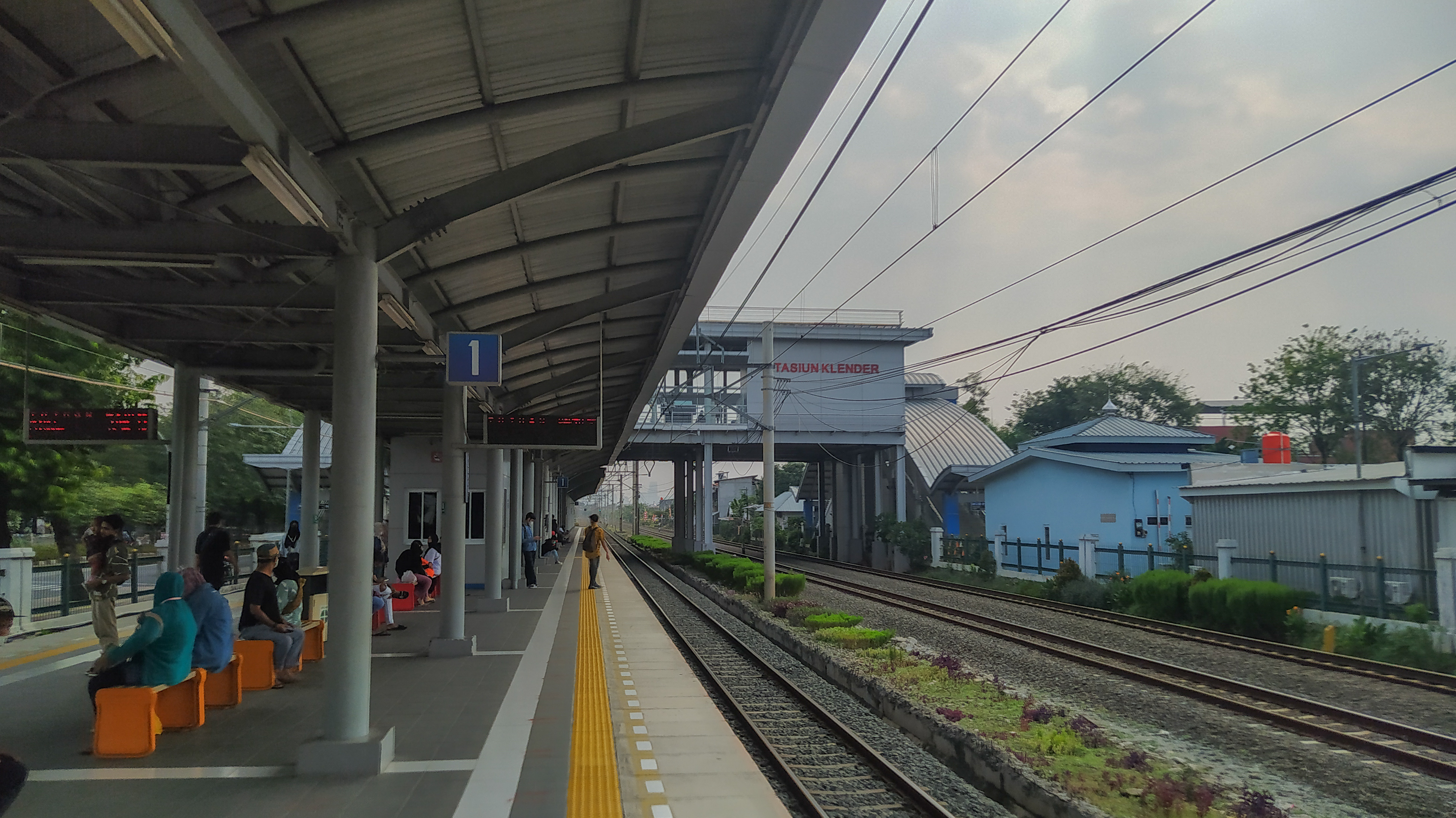
- The new building of Klender Station, as of 2022

General information
- Location: Jl. I Gusti Ngurah Rai, Jatinegara Kaum, Pulo Gadung, East Jakarta; Jakarta; Indonesia
- Coordinates: 6°12′48″S 106°53′59″E
- Elevation: +10 m (33 ft)
- Owner: Kereta Api Indonesia
- Operator: KAI Commuter
- Lines: Rajawali–Cikampek railway; Cikarang Loop Line
- Platforms: 1 island platform
- Tracks: 4
- Connections: Stasiun Klender

Construction
- Structure type: Ground
- Parking: Available
- Accessible: Available

Other information
- Station code: KLD • 0501
- Classification: Class II

History
- Rebuilt: 2017

Services
Preceding station		Following station
Jatinegara towards Angke, Kampung Bandan or Jakarta Kota	Commuter Line Cikarang	Buaran towards Bekasi or Cikarang
Location
- Location within Jakarta

Klender Station (KLD) is a railway station located in Jatinegara Kaum, Pulo Gadung, East Jakarta, Indonesia. The station, which is located at an altitude of +10 m, is included in the Jakarta Operational Area I and only serves KRL Commuterline trips.

== Building and layout ==
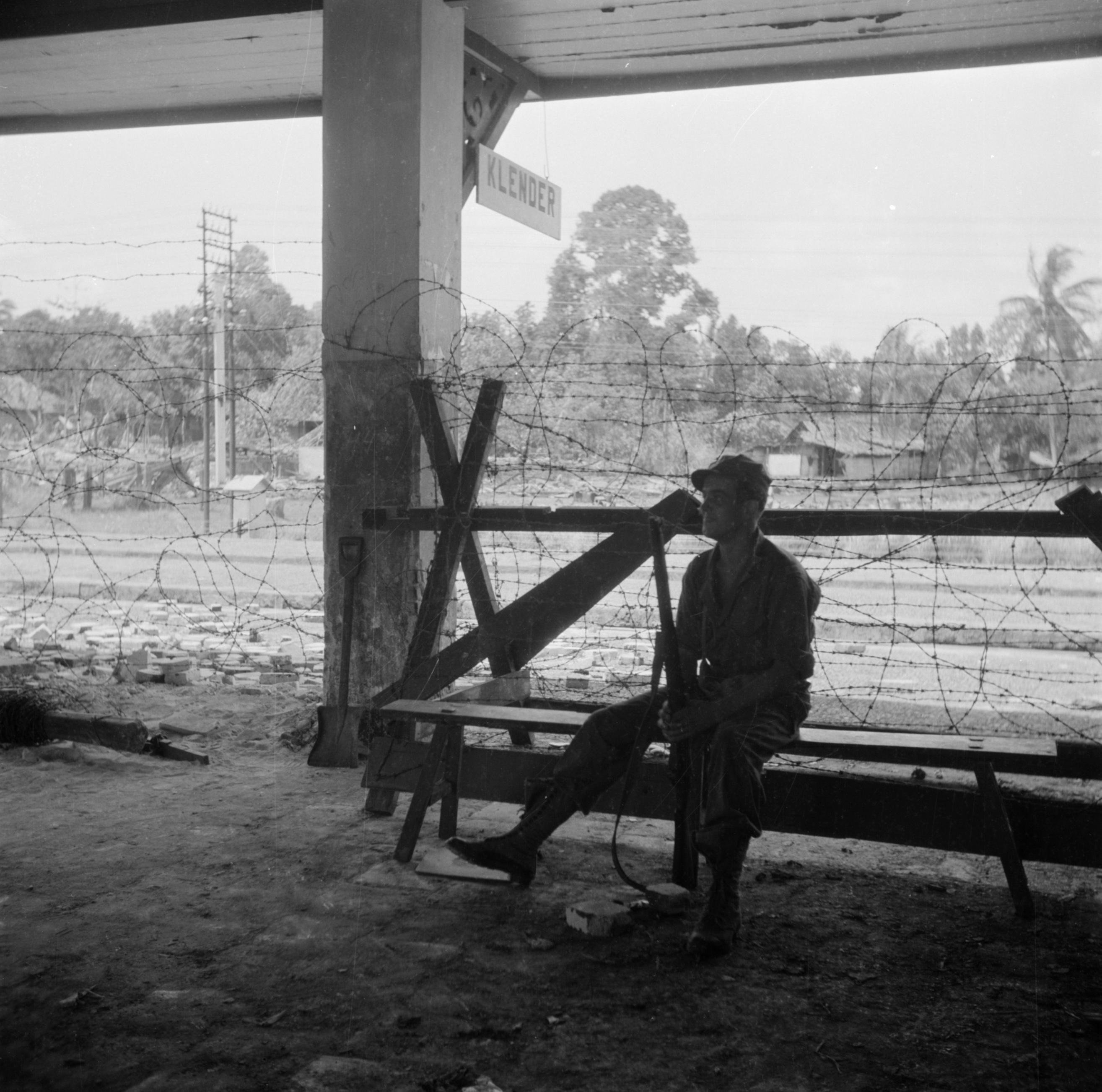
A Dutch soldier sitting at the Klender Station as Staatsspoorwegen's legacy (1946)

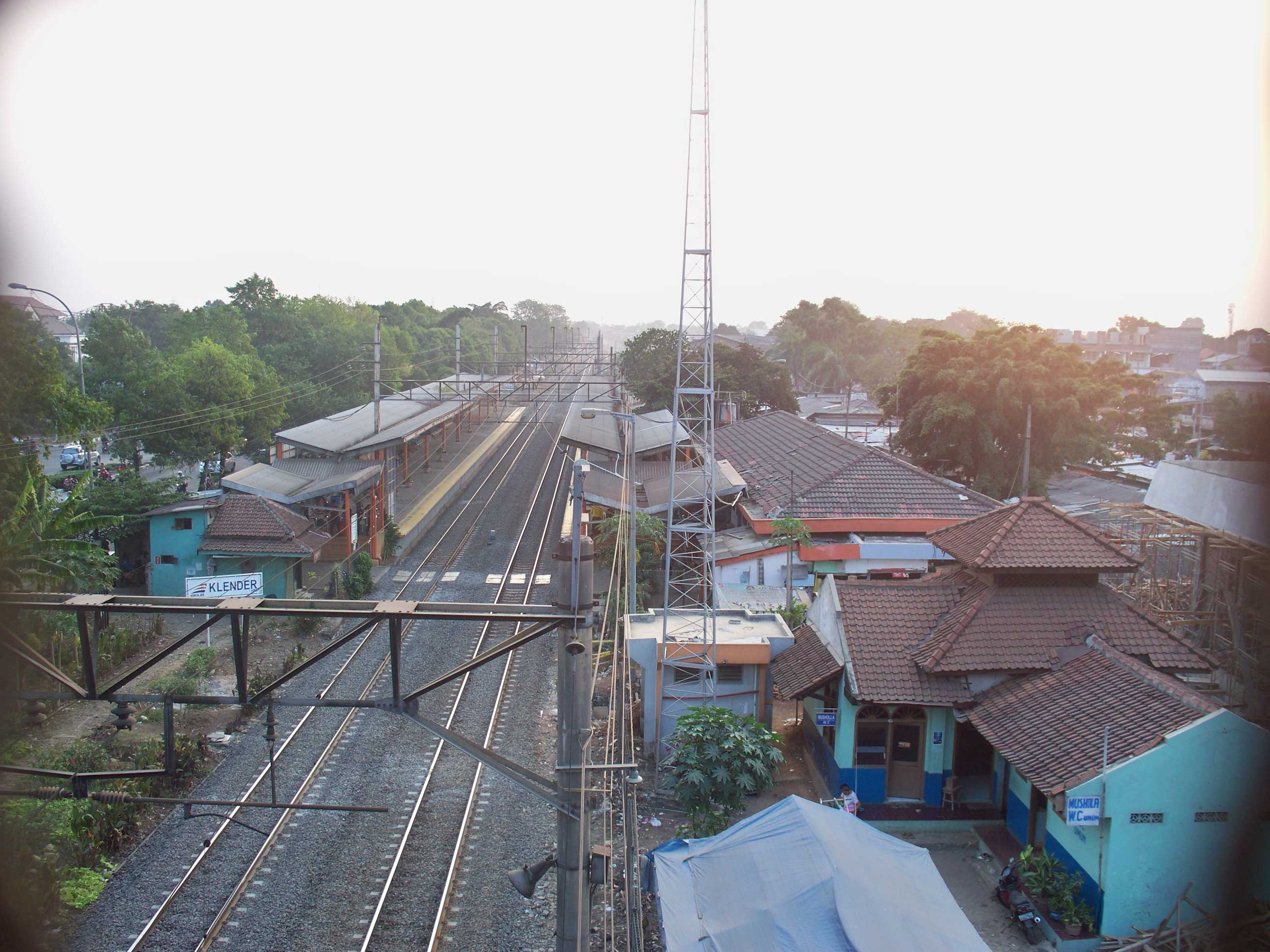
The old building of Klender Station in 2012.

This station is one of the railway stations whose platforms were only able to accommodate short KRL trains; the platform of this station can only accommodate 6 train cars, while the remaining 2 cars do not have a platform, so the passengers who will get off at this station shift to other cars that have platforms. However, now the platform of this station has been extended so that it can accommodate a series of 12 KRL train cars.

Since 26 October 2018, this station has used a new building with a futuristic modern minimalist architecture which is located near the old building. This relocation changed the layout of the railway track, which was originally flanked by two side platforms into one island platform between the two railway tracks. The old station building, which was once a fire has been torn down since construction took place.

C16
1st floor	Concourse, ticket counter, ticket gates
P Platform floor	Straight tracks for long-distance train to Jatinegara
P Platform floor	Straight tracks for long-distance train to Cikarang
P Platform floor	Line 2	← (Jatinegara) Cikarang Loop Line towards Jatinegara loop
P Platform floor	Island platform
P Platform floor	Line 1	Cikarang Loop Line to Cikarang (Buaran) →

== Services ==
The following is a list of train services at the Klender Station.

=== Passenger services ===
- KAI Commuter
  - Cikarang Loop Line (Full Racket)
    - to Cikarang (direct service)
    - to Cikarang (looping through Manggarai-Kampung Bandan-Pasar Senen and vice versa)
  - Cikarang Loop Line (Half Racket), to Angke/Kampung Bandan (via Tanah Abang and Duri) and Cikarang

== Supporting transportation ==
Public transport type	Station	Line	Destination
TransJakarta	Stasiun Klender	List of TransJakarta corridors#Corridor 11	Kampung Melayu–Pulo Gebang
TransJakarta	N/A	11A (MetroTrans)	Layur-Pulo Gebang
TransJakarta	N/A	11M (MiniTrans)	Rusun Rawa Bebek-Bukit Duri
TransJakarta	N/A	11N (MiniTrans)	Rusun Cipinang Muara-Stasiun Jatinegara 2
TransJakarta	N/A	11R (MiniTrans)	Rusun Cakung-Bukit Duri
TransJakarta	N/A	JAK 26 (Jak Lingko)	Rawamangun Terminal-Duren Sawit
TransJakarta	N/A	JAK 74 (Jak Lingko)	Rawamangun Terminal-Pondok Bambu
MetroMini	N/A	506	Pulo Gebang Terminal-Kampung Melayu Terminal
Mikrolet	N/A	M27	Kampung Melayu Terminal-Pulo Gadung Terminal (via Bekasi Timur Raya, I Gusti Ngurah Rai)
Koperasi Wahana Kalpika	N/A	T26	Rawamangun Terminal-Pondok Kelapa
Koperasi Wahana Kalpika	N/A	T27	Klender Station-Duren Sawit

== Incidents ==
- On 19 May 2017, Klender Station was on fire. KRL passengers were detained at Bekasi Station for 20 minutes. As a result of the fire at this station, temporarily all train and KRL services were stopped for an indefinite period of time and continued immediately.

== Gallery ==
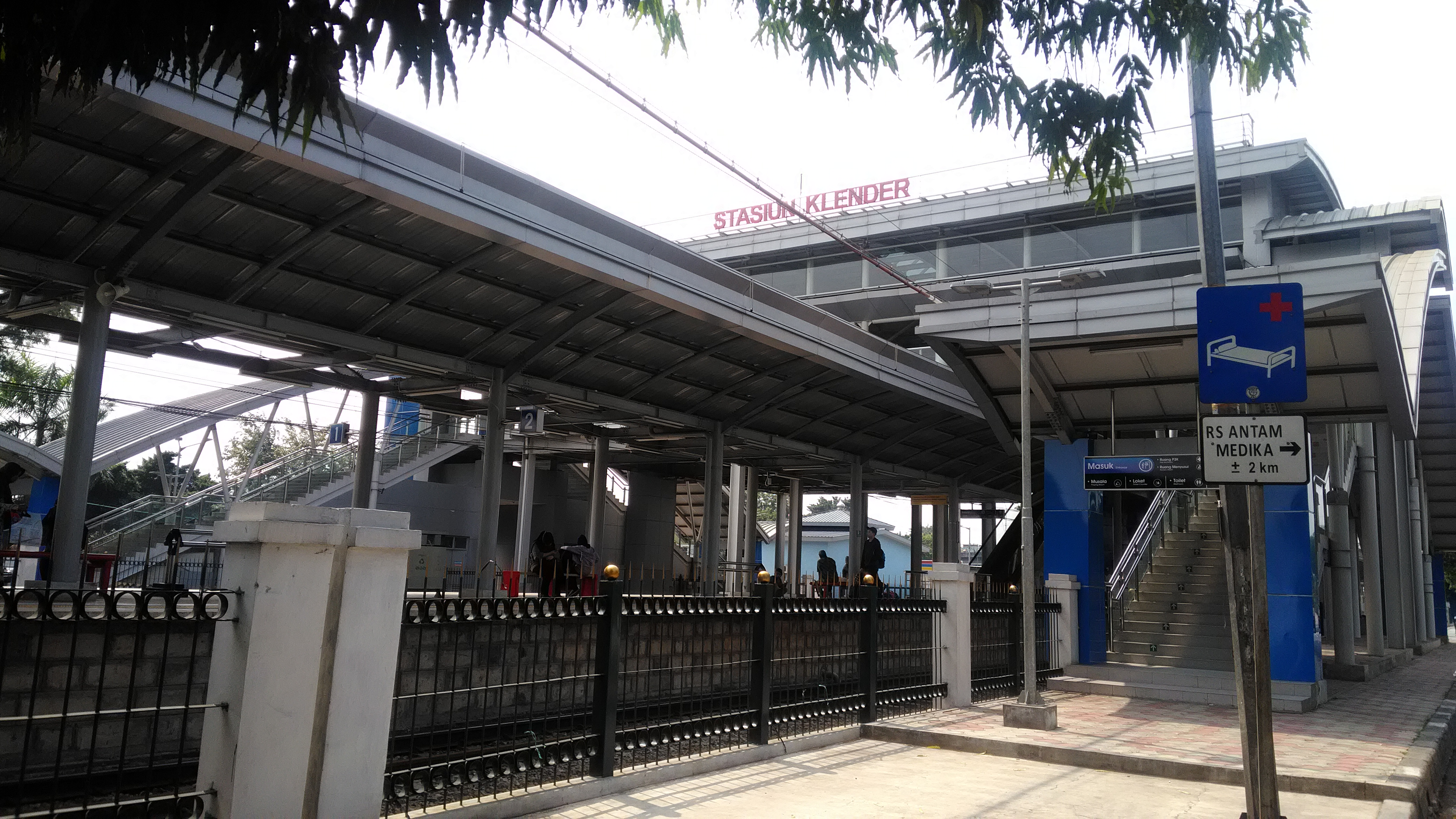
The new building of Klender Station, as of 2019

Preceding station	Kereta Api Indonesia	Following station
Cipinang towards Rajawali	Rajawali–Cikampek	Buaran towards Cikampek
