= Jakarta Garden City =

Coordinates: 6°11′S 106°57′E

Jakarta Garden City is a planned community at Cakung, East Jakarta, Indonesia. The township has a land area of 370 hectares. Upon completion, it will offer 7,000 landed residential properties, supported by retail and entertainment areas, international schools, hospitals, office buildings, shopping malls and other public facilities. The township is being developed by PT Mitra Sindo Sukses, a subsidiary of PT Modernland Realty Tbk (IDX: MDLN), itself owned by the Honoris family through PT Modern International Tbk (IDX: MDRN).

Jakarta Garden City is divided into three major areas, namely Garden City with an area of 134 hectares, River Garden 100 hectares and Lake Garden with an area of 136 hectares. Lake Garden area is completed in 2007 and has about 1000 residential units. Garden City, consists of 6 clusters that have been completed and inhabited. Few clusters at the River Garden area have been completed and others are under construction. Aeon Mall is expected to be opened in the township by September, 2017. A Mayapada Hospital is also under construction and expected to be inaugurated within 2017.

== See also ==
- J-Sky
