= Kranji railway station =

Railway station in Indonesia

C20 Kranji Station Stasiun Kranji
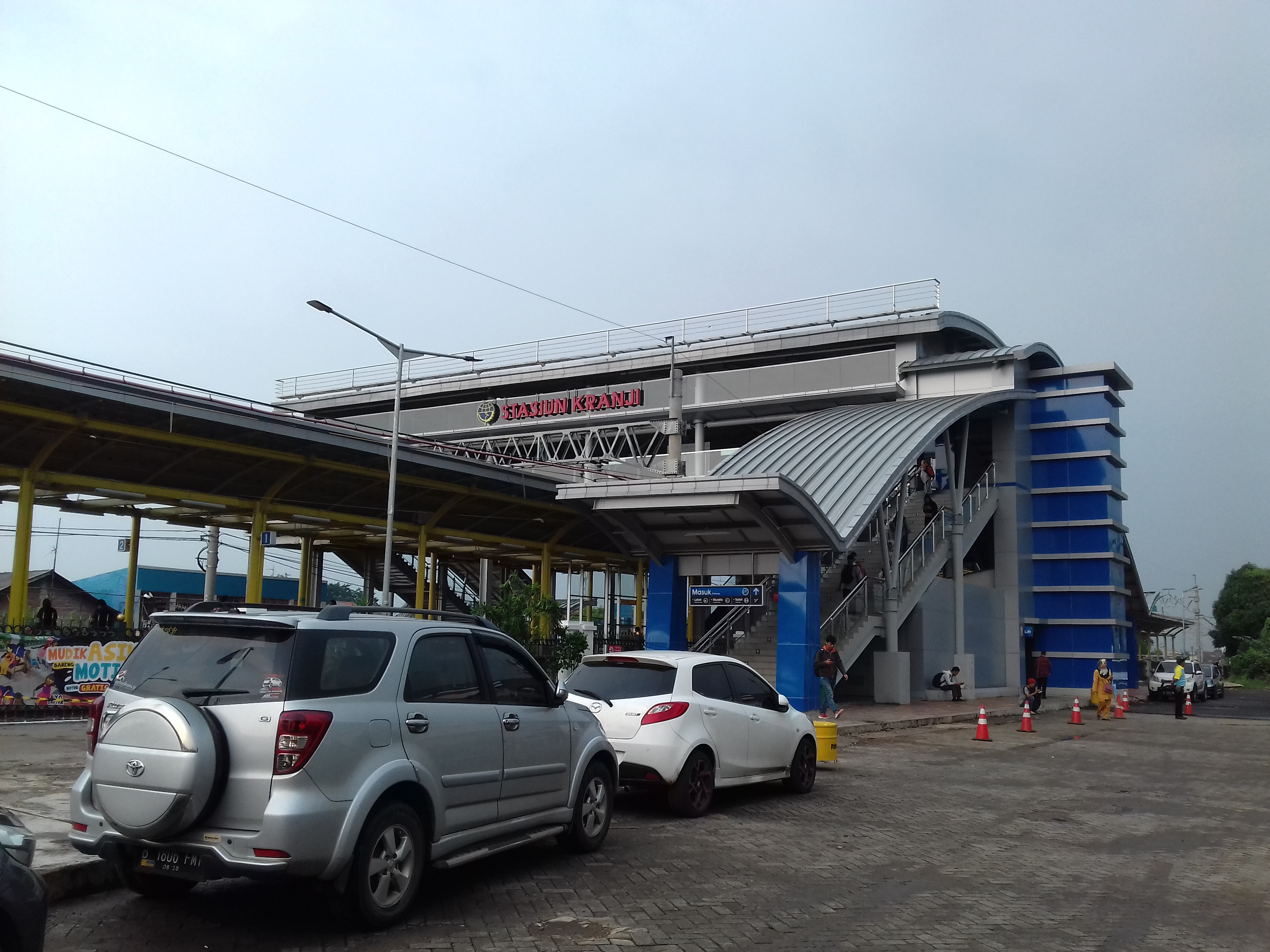
- Kranji Station

General information
- Location: Jl. Jenderal Sudirman Kranji, West Bekasi, Bekasi; Indonesia
- Coordinates: 6.2245124999999994°S 106.9798459°E
- Elevation: +18 m (59 ft)
- Owner: Kereta Api Indonesia
- Operator: KAI Commuter
- Lines: Rajawali–Cikampek railway; Cikarang Loop Line
- Platforms: 1 island platform
- Tracks: 4

Construction
- Structure type: Ground
- Parking: Available
- Accessible: Available

Other information
- Station code: KRI • 0503
- Classification: Class III

History
- Rebuilt: 2017

Services
Preceding station		Following station
Cakung towards Angke, Kampung Bandan or Jakarta Kota	Commuter Line Cikarang	Bekasi towards Bekasi or Cikarang
Location
- Location within Bekasi

Kranji Station (KRI) is a class III railway station located in Kranji, West Bekasi, Bekasi, West Java. The station, which is located at an altitude of +18 m, is included in the Operation Area I Jakarta and is the westernmost railway station in Bekasi City and West Java for the Rajawali–Cikampek railway, as well as the northernmost in West Java. This station only serves the Cikarang Loop Line.

To the west from this station, before Cakung Station, there used to be Rawabebek Station which has now been demolished due to low occupancy.

== Building and layout ==
This station has four train lines, one pair for KRL Commuterline services and another pair for long-distance/non-KRL trains to pass through.

Since 8 January 2019, this station has used a new building located on top of the old station building, with a futuristic modern minimalist architecture, the station layout was changed from two railway tracks flanked by side platforms to two railway tracks with an island platform in the middle.

C20
1st floor
Concourse, ticket counter, ticket gates
P

Platform floor

Straight tracks for long-distance train to Jatinegara
Straight tracks for long-distance train to Cikarang
Line 2
← (Cakung) Cikarang Loop Line towards Jatinegara loop
Island platform
Line 1
Cikarang Loop Line to Cikarang (Bekasi) →

== Services ==
The following is a list of train services at the Kranji Station.

=== Passenger services ===
- KAI Commuter
  - Cikarang Loop Line (Full Racket)
    - to Cikarang (direct service)
    - to Cikarang (looping through Manggarai-Kampung Bandan-Pasar Senen and vice versa)
  - Cikarang Loop Line (Half Racket), to Angke/Kampung Bandan (via Tanah Abang and Duri) and Cikarang

== Supporting transportation ==
Public transport type	Line	Destination
Koperasi Angkutan Bekasi (Koasi)	K01	Bekasi Terminal-Pulo Gadung Terminal
Koperasi Angkutan Bekasi (Koasi)	K03	Kranji Station-Klender Terminal
Koperasi Angkutan Bekasi (Koasi)	K07	Bekasi Terminal-Harapan Jaya
Koperasi Angkutan Bekasi (Koasi)	K25	Sepanjang Jaya-Pulo Gebang Terminal
Koperasi Angkutan Bekasi (Koasi)	K30	Kranji Station-Pejuang
Koperasi Angkutan Bekasi (Koasi)	K31A	Margahayu-Harapan Jaya
Koperasi Angkutan Bekasi (Koasi) Bekasi Regency	K10	Bahagia-Bekasi Terminal (via Ujung Harapan Raya)
Mikrolet	M19	Kranji Station-Cililitan
Koperasi Wahana Kalpika	T20	Kranji Station-Pulo Gadung Terminal

== Gallery ==
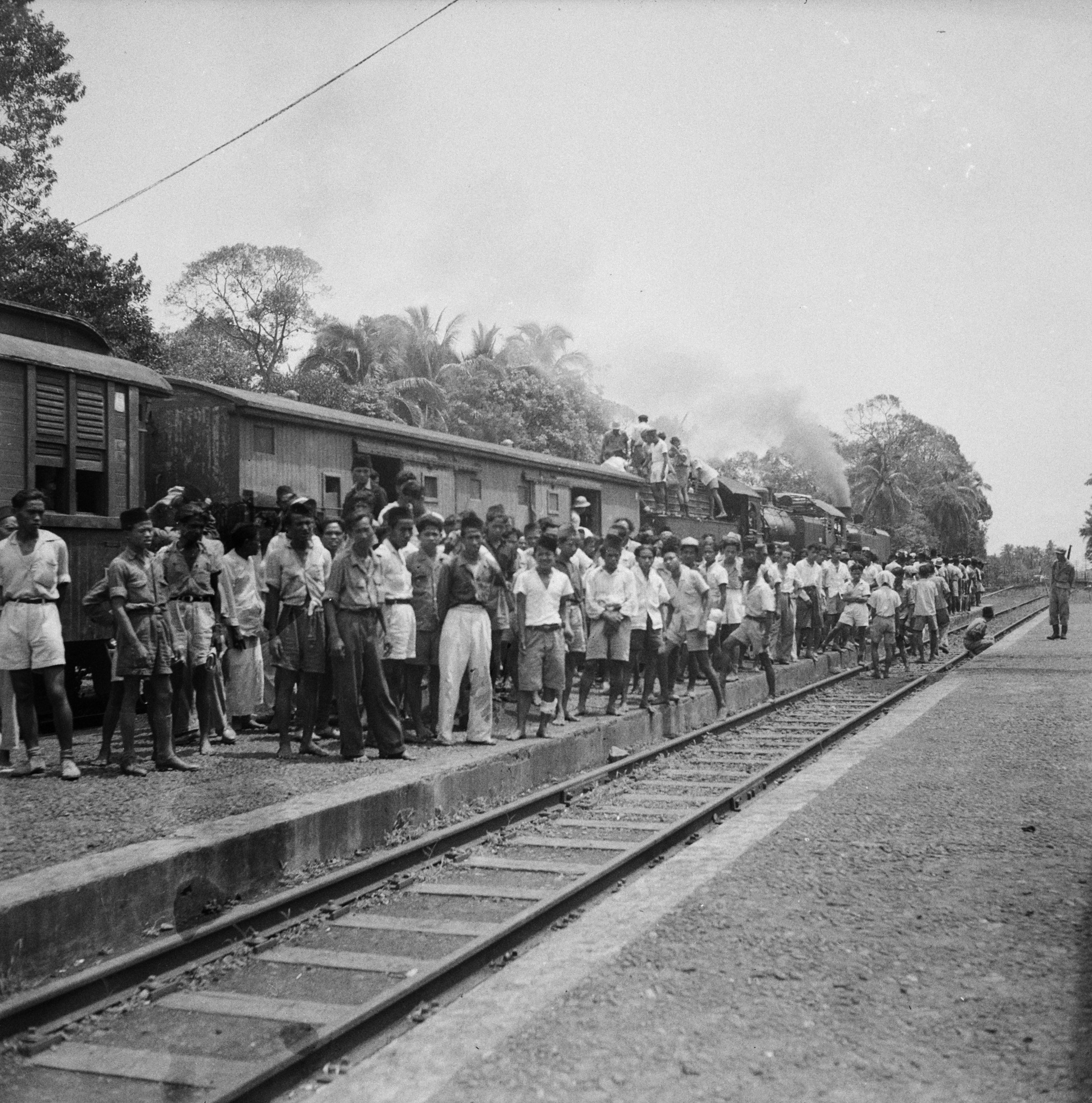
Passengers on the Kranji station platform, 1946.

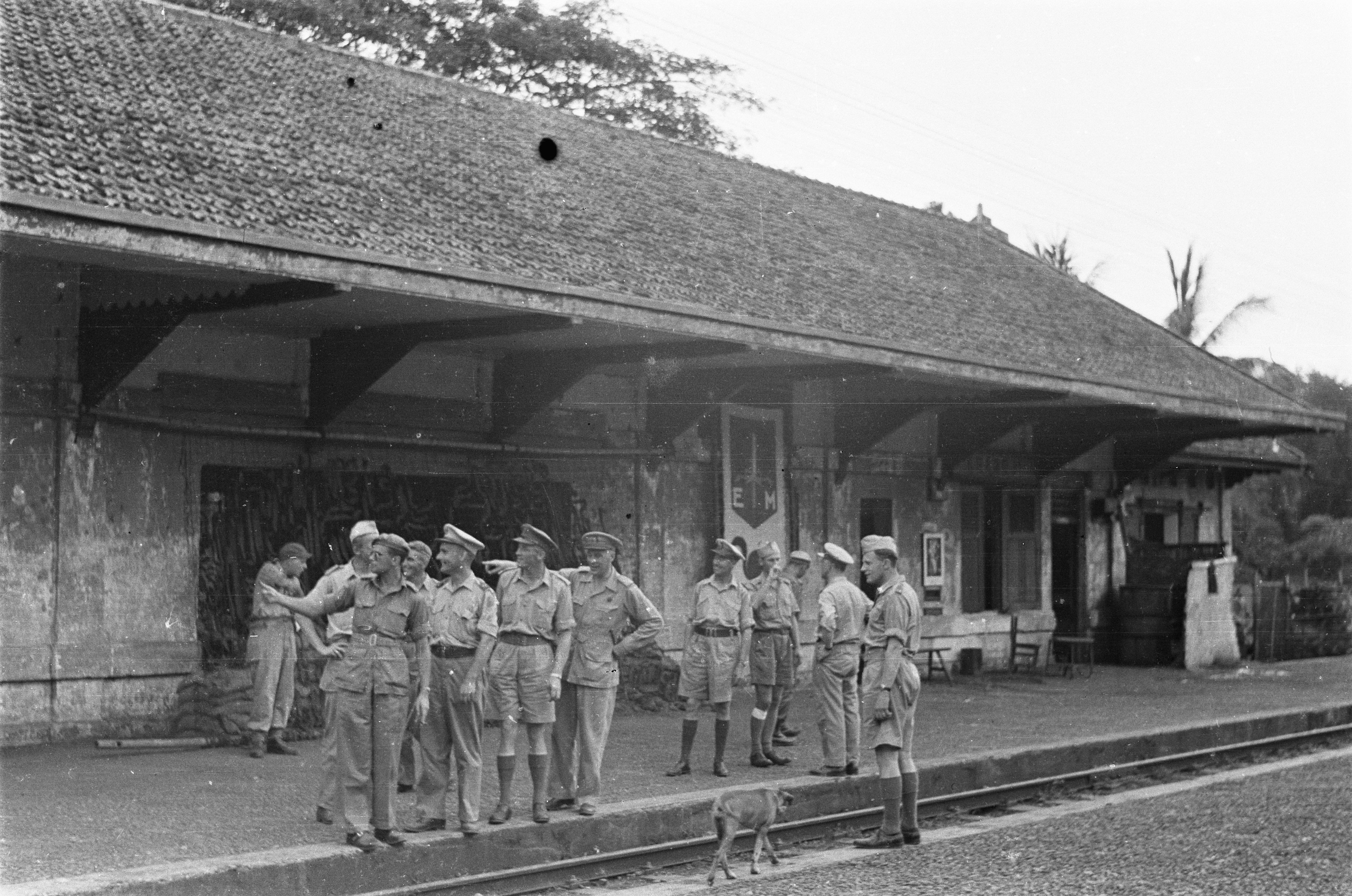
Group photo of Dutch soldiers at Kranji Station, 2 May 1947

Preceding station	Kereta Api Indonesia	Following station
Cakung towards Rajawali	Rajawali–Cikampek	Bekasi towards Cikampek
