= Pulo Gebang Bus Terminal =

Bus terminal in eastern Jakarta, Indonesia

Pulo Gebang Terminal
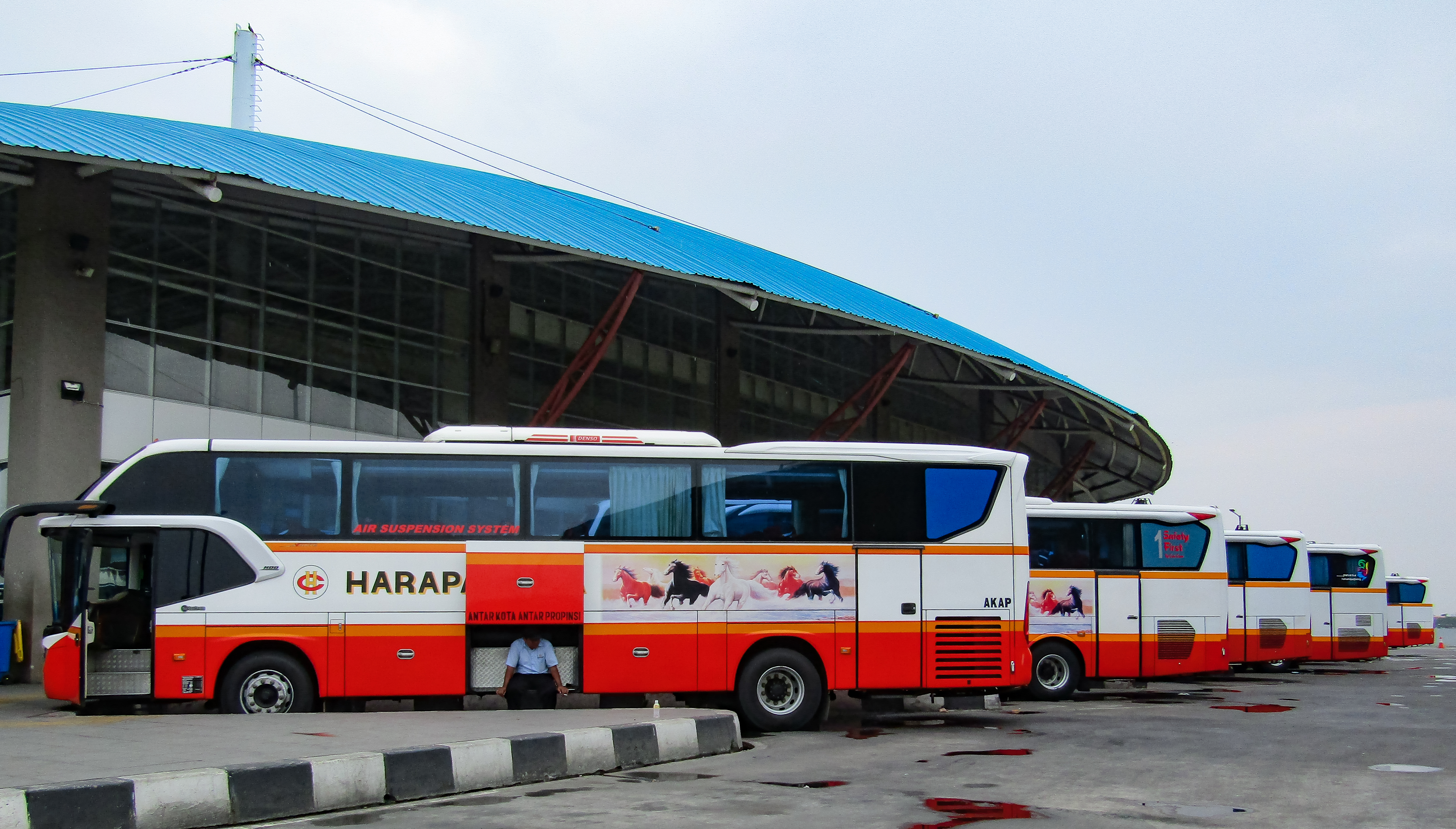
- Harapan Jaya buses parked at the departure zone of Pulo Gebang terminal
- Interactive map of the Pulo Gebang Terminal area
- Alternative names: Terminal Bus Terpadu Sentra Timur Pulo Gebang

General information
- Type: Bus terminal
- Location: (Indonesia) Jakarta, Jl. Pulo Gebang, Cakung, East Jakarta
- Construction started: 2009
- Completed: 2012
- Inaugurated: 28 December 2016
- Cost: Rp. 448.6 billion (roughly 33.3 million USD)

Design and construction
- Architect: Paul Tanjung Tan

Pulo Gebang Bus Terminal is a type-A bus terminal at Cakung in East Jakarta, Indonesia, arguably the largest in Southeast Asia. The terminal was opened on 28 December 2016. Designed by Paul Tanjung Tan, it was built to replace the unfeasible Pulo Gadung terminal and provide a comfortable, safe, and well-accessible transportation service. Buses to and from Central and East Java usually use this terminal.

The bus terminal has a land area of about 12.6 hectares with four building blocks. Each passenger terminal has a four-story building with elevators, escalators, automatic doors, AC waiting rooms and surveillance cameras or CCTV. The terminal has dedicated areas for the food court, retail shop, mosque, car parking, health centre, and others. It is also become the terminus of Transjakarta's BRT and feeder buses. The main BRT corridor operates 24 hours.

== Facilities ==
Facilities available in Pulo Gebang bus terminal are:

- Mezzanine floor

Counters for intercity buses, Transjakarta bus stop, announcement room and other facilities.

- 1st floor

Parking lots for intercity buses, cars, motorcycle and taxi parking, mosque, information room, cafeteria, mobile gas refueling station and public refueling station.

- 2nd floor

Waiting room for passengers with facilities such as terminal post, health post, nursing room and phone recharging stand.

- 3rd floor

Used as snacking center or food court and place for 54 stalls, as well astoilet room.

- 4th floor

Office room for terminal management, representative for the bus companies (PO) and control room.

Other supporting facilities include:

- Health facility stand by for 24 hours
- Resting room for bus crew for 24 hours
- Fire extinguishers in every room
- Free toilets
- Mosque with a capacity of roughly 700 people
- Spacious parking area for cars and motorcycles
- 62 CCTVs in the terminal area
- Security post with police, military garrison, and municipal police (Satpol PP) in every side of the terminal.

== Intercity bus routes ==
=== To West Java ===
- Bandung: Sinar Jaya
- Banjar: Budiman
- Cirebon–Kuningan: Luragung Jaya, Sahabat, and Setia Negara
- Tasikmalaya: Budiman

=== To Central Java ===
- Baturetno: Agra Mas, GM Royal
- Cepu: Berlian Jaya, Garuda Mas, Laju Prima
- Cilacap: DAMRI, DMI, Murni Jaya, and Sinar Jaya
- Gemolong: Garuda Mas, Haryanto, Laju Prima, Raya, and Sinar Jaya
- Jepara (via Kudus): Agra Mas, Bejeu, Berlian Jaya, Haryanto, Kencana, Muji Jaya, Nusantara, Rimba Raya, Sahalah, Shantika
- Jatipuro: Laju Prima
- Klaten (via Magelang, Sleman): Murni Jaya, Sinar Jaya, Rosalia Indah, KYM Trans, Handoyo, and Mulyo Indah
- Kudus: Berlian Jaya, Haryanto, Nusantara
- Lasem: Berlian Jaya, Haryanto, Muji Jaya, Rosalia Indah, Shantika, Sinar Jaya
- Semarang: Haryanto
- Pati: Madu Kismo, Haryanto, Bejeu, Nusantara, Selamet, Shantika, Trans Zentrum, Handoyo, and Sudiro Tungga Jaya
- Pekalongan: Dewi Sri, Dedy Jaya, Kurnia Jaya, Putri Jaya, and Sinar Jaya
- Purwantoro: Agra Mas, Agung Sejati, GMS, Laju Prima, Gunung Mulia, Putera Mulya, Pahala Kencana, Sedya Mulya, Tunggal Dara, Tunggal Dara Putera, and Rosalia Indah
- Purwodadi, Grobogan: Bayu Megah, Bejeu, Trans Zentrum, Haryanto, Garuda Mas, Sinar Jaya, and Laju Prima
- Purwokerto: DAMRI, Dewi Sri, Dedy Jaya, DMI, Kurnia Jaya, Pahala Kencana, Putri Jaya, Rosalia Indah, Sinar Jaya, Setia Negara, and Laju Prima
- Purworejo (via Kebumen): Karya Sari, Kurnia Jaya, Sinar Jaya, and Sumber Alam
- Sragen: 27 Trans, Harta Sanjaya
- Surakarta: Haryanto, Langsung Jaya, Rosalia Indah, Raya, Safari Lux, Sudiro Tungga Jaya, Sinar Jaya, Agra Mas, Gunung Mulia, Putera Mulya, and Hasta Putra
- Wonosobo: Dieng Indah, DMI, Murni Jaya, Pahala Kencana, Sinar Jaya, Setia Negara, Rosalia Indah, and DAMRI

=== To Special Region of Yogyakarta ===
- Yogyakarta (via Bumiayu-Ajibarang-Kebumen): Maju Lancar, Rosalia Indah, Sinar Jaya, Sumber Alam, Murni Jaya, DAMRI, and Putera Mulya
- Yogyakarta (via Kartasura–Klaten): Agra Mas, Cititrans, Gunung Harta, Harapan Jaya, Haryanto, Murni Jaya, Sinar Jaya, Sudiro Tungga Jaya, Unicorn Indorent
- Sleman (via Temanggung): Handoyo, Maju Lancar, Safari Dharma Raya, Santoso, Murni Jaya, KYM Trans, and Gunung Harta Solutions
- Yogyakarta-Jombor (via Bawen–Magelang): Murni Jaya, Ramayana, Santoso, Sinar Jaya, Rosalia Indah, Mulyo Indah, and Pahala Kencana
- Sleman (via Kartasura–Klaten): Murni Jaya and Unicorn Indorent
- Wonosari: Maju Lancar, Murni Jaya, Rosalia Indah, Santoso, Sinar Jaya

=== To East Java ===
- Bangkalan: Haryanto
- Blitar: Harapan Jaya, Lorena, Mahkota Trans, M Trans, Rana Jaya, Rosalia Indah, Sinar Jaya, Surya Trans
- Banyuwangi (via Jember): Akas Asri, Gunung Harta Solutions, Pandawa 87, and Lorena
- Bojonegoro: Haryanto, Lorena, Pahala Kencana, and Agra Mas
- Bondowoso: GHTS, Handoyo
- Gresik (via Semarang-Tuban): Barkholid
- Gresik (via Tol Krian): Sinar Jaya
- Jember: AKAS Aurora, Rosalia Indah
- Lamongan (via Ngawi): Nusa Indah
- Madiun: Harapan Jaya
- Magetan: Harapan Jaya, Sindoro Sejahtera Mulya, Tunas Muda
- Malang (via Blitar): Medali Mas
- Malang (via Surabaya): 27 Trans, Cititrans, GHTS, Haryanto, Juragan99, Kramat Djati, Lorena, M Trans, Medali Mas, Pahala Kencana, Rosalia Indah, Unicorn Indorent
- Pacitan: Agra Mas
- Ponorogo (via Madiun): GHTS, Kramat Djati, Lorena, Narendra, Sinar Jaya, Sindoro Sejahtera Mulya, Tunas Muda
- Ponorogo via Wonogiri: Rosalia Indah
- Surabaya (via Trans-Java Toll Road): 27Trans, DAMRI, KYM Trans, GHTS, Kramat Djati, Lorena, Pahala Kencana, and Rosalia Indah
- Sumenep: GHTS, Haryanto, Karina, Lorena, Pahala Kencana
- Surabaya (via Ngawi): Harapan Jaya, Mawar and Sinar Jaya
- Surabaya via Semarang - Tuban: Sari Indah
- Trenggalek: Rosalia Indah
- Tulungagung: Harapan Jaya

=== To Bali and West Nusa Tenggara ===
- Bima: Rasa Sayang, Tiara Mas, Langsung Indah, Safari Dharma Raya, Dunia Mas, and Titian Mas
- Denpasar: Safari Dharma Raya, Lorena, Kramat Djati, Pahala Kencana, and Gunung Harta

=== To major cities in Sumatra ===
- Banda Aceh: Putra Pelangi
- Bandar Lampung: Efisien and Minanga Express
- Bengkulu: CSH 88, Putra Rafflesia, and Siliwangi Antar Nusa
- Bukittinggi: Anas Nasional Sejahtera, Pangeran, and LBJ Transport
- Jambi: EPA Star, Jambi Transport, Laju Prima, and Putra Remaja
- Lubuk Basung: LBJ Transport
- Medan: Antar Lintas Sumatra, Sempati Star, and Pratama Makmur Jaya
- Padang: Bintang Permata Bunda, EPA Star, Gumarang Jaya, MPM, New PPJ Mas (Putra Paris Jaya), Naiklah Perusahaan Minang, Palala, Sembodo, Transport Express Jaya, and Yoanda Prima
- Palembang: Adhi Prima, EPA Star, Giri Indah, Hiba Putra, Lantra Jaya, Lorena, and Ranau Indah
- Pekanbaru: Lorena, Siliwangi Antar Nusa
- Sekayu: EPA Star

== Transjakarta routes ==
11 01 Pulo Gebang
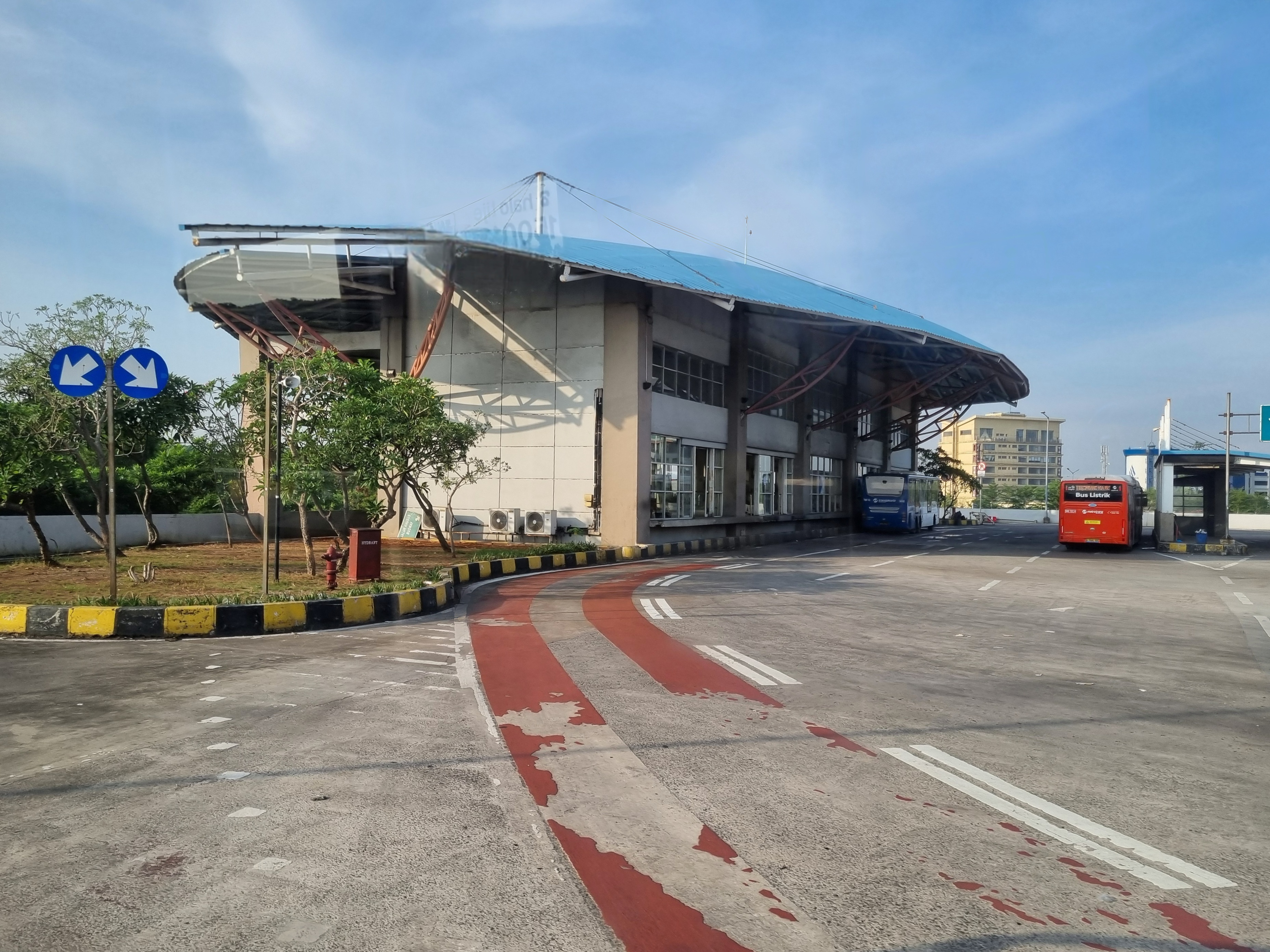
- The southernmost building of the terminal that serves as the terminus for Transjakarta bus routes

General information
- Location: Pulo Gebang Bus Terminal; Sejajar Sisi Tol Timur KM 2 Street, Pulo Gebang, Cakung, East Jakarta 13950, Indonesia
- Coordinates: 6.211369°S 106.950968°E
- System: Transjakarta bus rapid transit station
- Owner: Transjakarta
- Operator: Transjakarta
- Lines: List of TransJakarta corridors#Corridor 11
- Platforms: Single side platform

Construction
- Structure type: At-grade
- Cycle facilities: No

Other information
- Status: In service

History
- Opened: 23 June 2012 (limited operations); 28 December 2016 (full operations)

Services
Preceding		Following
Terminus	Corridor 11	Walikota Jakarta Timur towards Kampung Melayu
Location

Starting 1 February 2017, Badan Pengelola Trans Jabodetabek (BPTJ) operates 4 feeder routes from and to 4 terminals throughout Jakarta to Pulo Gebang terminal.

There are a total of 7 Transjakarta routes to Pulo Gebang terminal, which are:

Transjakarta
Service type	Route	Destination	Fare (IDR)
Regular BRT	List of TransJakarta corridors#Corridor 11	Pulo Gebang – Kampung Melayu	3,500
Inner-city feeder		Pulo Gebang – Pulo Gadung via Perkampungan Industri Kecil (PIK) Penggilingan	3,500
Inner-city feeder		Pulo Gebang – Kampung Melayu via East Flood Canal (BKT)	3,500
Mikrotrans Jak Lingko	JAK-27	Pulo Gebang – Rorotan	Free
Mikrotrans Jak Lingko	JAK-40	Pulo Gebang – Harapan Baru	Free
Mikrotrans Jak Lingko	JAK-100	Pulo Gebang – Rusun Pinus Elok	Free
Mikrotrans Jak Lingko	JAK-110A	Pulo Gebang – Rusun Marunda	Free

== Other bus routes ==
- Perum DAMRI
  - Pulo Gebang Terminal–Soekarno–Hatta International Airport

== Angkot routes ==
The angkot (share taxi) routes are:

- Jakarta
  - Koperasi Wahana Kalpika (KWK)
    - T22 Pulo Gebang Terminal - Pulo Gadung Terminal via Bekasi Raya - Sultan Agung - Boulevard Harapan Indah
    - T25 Pulo Gebang Terminal - Rawamangun Terminal via Cakung-Cilincing– I Gusti Ngurah Rai
    - T29 Pulo Gebang Terminal - Pulo Gadung Terminal via Dr. Radjiman - Cakung-Cilincing
    - T32 Pulo Gebang Terminal - Pulo Gadung Terminal via Bekasi Raya - Pulo Gebang Raya
    - U01 Pulo Gebang Terminal - Tanjung Priok Terminal via Cakung-Cilincing - Jampea
    - U03 Pulo Gebang Terminal - Tanjung Priok Terminal via Tipar Cakung - Jampea
  - APB
    - T03 Pulo Gebang Terminal - Klender Terminal
- Bekasi
  - KOASI
    - K22 Pulo Gebang Terminal - Pondok Gede via Jatiwaringin Raya - Kol. Soegiono - Buaran Raya - I Gusti Ngurah Rai
    - K25 Pulo Gebang Terminal - Bekasi Terminal via Sultan Agung - Jend. A. Yani - Cut Meutia

== Gallery ==
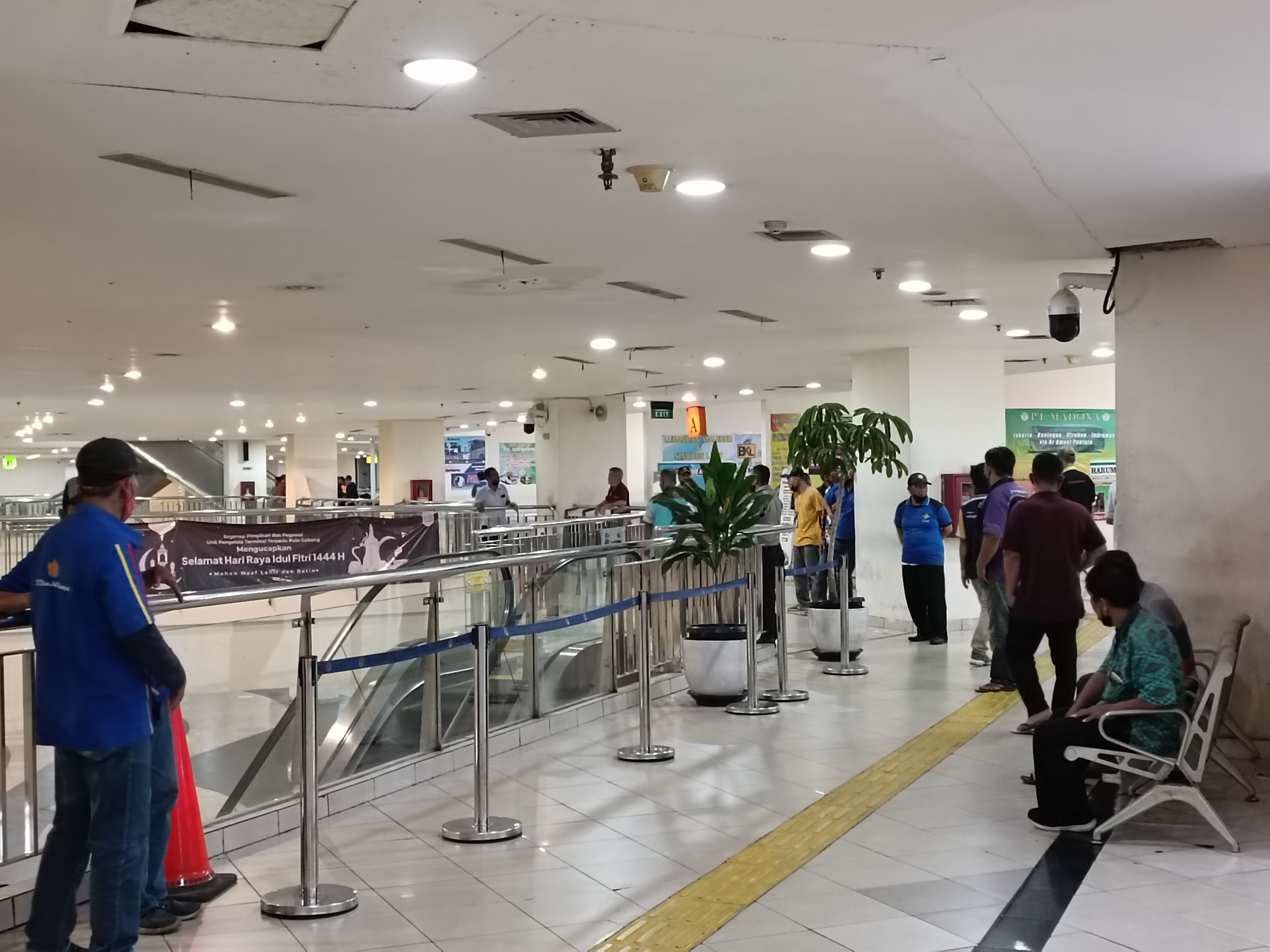
Mezzanine area

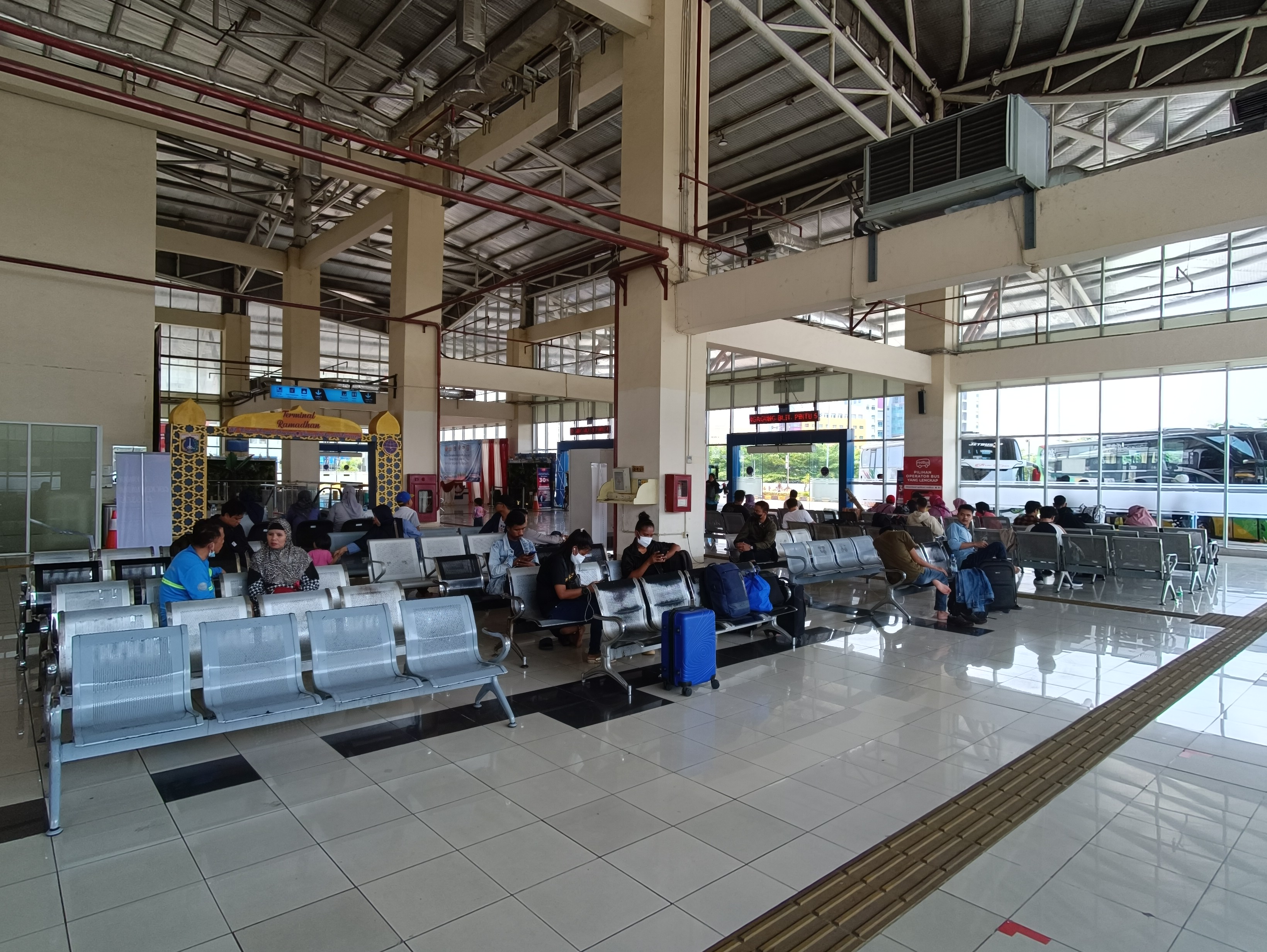
Waiting area at the departure zone

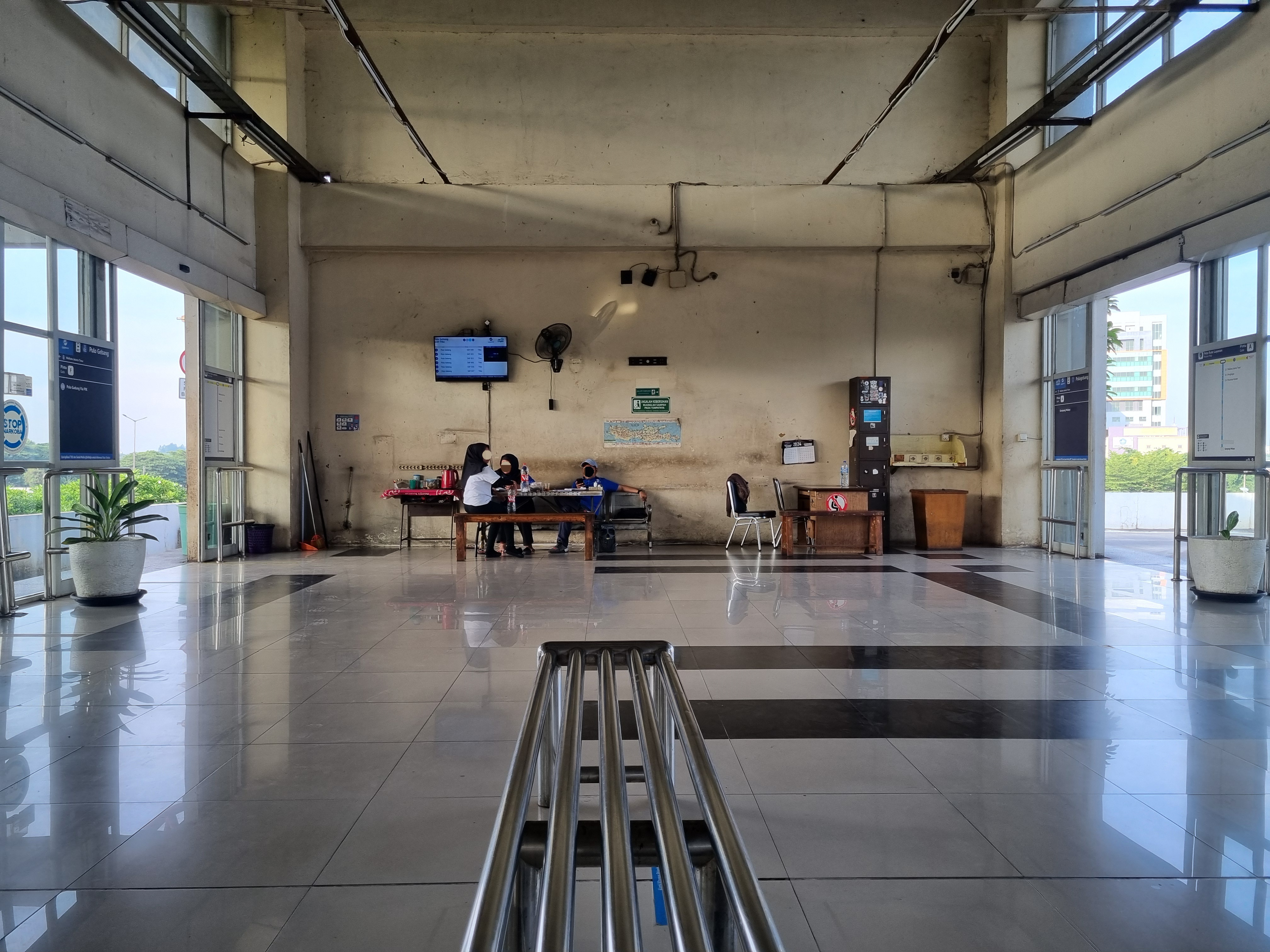
Inner view of the southernmost building, serving Transjakarta bus routes

== See also ==
- Cakung
- Transjakarta
- Blok M Bus Terminal – Located in Kebayoran Baru, South Jakarta, which only serves inner city transport
