= MetroMini =

Former Public Transportation in Jakarta, Indonesia

Metro Mini
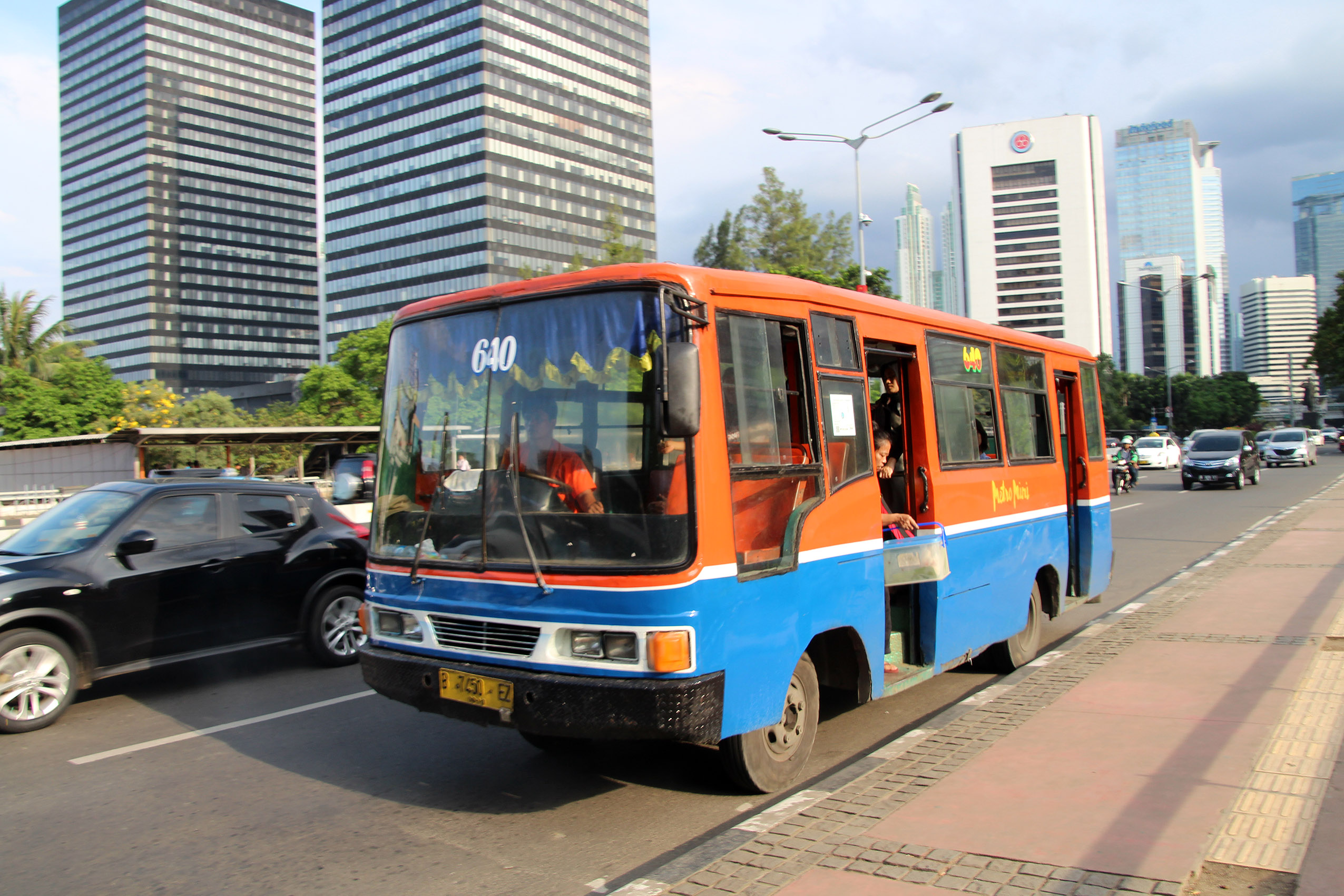
- A MetroMini bus on Sudirman avenue

Overview
- Locale: Jakarta, Indonesia
- Transit type: Minibus

Operation
- Began operation: 1962
- Ended operation: 2020 (Replaced in role by Metrotrans and Minitrans)

The MetroMini minibus system was a major part of the public transport system of Jakarta. There were reportedly over 3,000 buses in the MetroMini fleet in mid-2012. The buses are similar to the parallel Kopaja system which also provides transport services, on different routes, across Jakarta. The distinctive MetroMini buses are orange and blue with a white stripe running along the length of the bus. Buses provide seating for around 20-30 people with, often, an equal number crammed into limited standing room so the buses are often overcrowded. But at 2015 Jakarta Governor Basuki Tjahaja Purnama ordered a complete termination of MetroMini's bus operations, following an incident involving a MetroMini bus and KRL Commuterline train. If MetroMini wants to operate again, it has to join Transjakarta like the Kopaja as a feeder bus. Many routes are/will replaced/replaced by Minitrans and Metrotrans buses.

== Policy issues ==
There is considerable public debate in Jakarta about the services provided by the minibus fleets. The minibus systems are, at best, only loosely regulated. They are part of the large informal sector which underpins the more formalised part of the Jakarta economy.

On one hand, the buses are cheap and plentiful. On the other hand, passengers frequently complain about the quality of services. For example, safety is often compromised by this practice of overloading. In addition, the drivers are often reckless and do not pay attention to traffic signs and other traffic. Like the Kopaja buses, the MetroMini bus diesel vehicles are often badly maintained and contribute significant amounts of pollution in Jakarta. Indeed, many of the buses are known to operate without such basic equipment as handbrakes and speedometers. Some observers take the view that the structure of the Minibus system, which is largely run by individuals operating in a semi-legal manner, needs to be better regulated. In principle, bus operators are required to abide by Indonesian laws and regulations about public transportation. But in practice, operators often ignore these laws. For example, in principle, public transport is required to be provided by legal firms which have a corporate structure but this is generally not the case with the MetroMini buses. Some bus owners are reported to have formed a cooperative but the corporate arrangements are described as "ramshackle."

== Routes ==
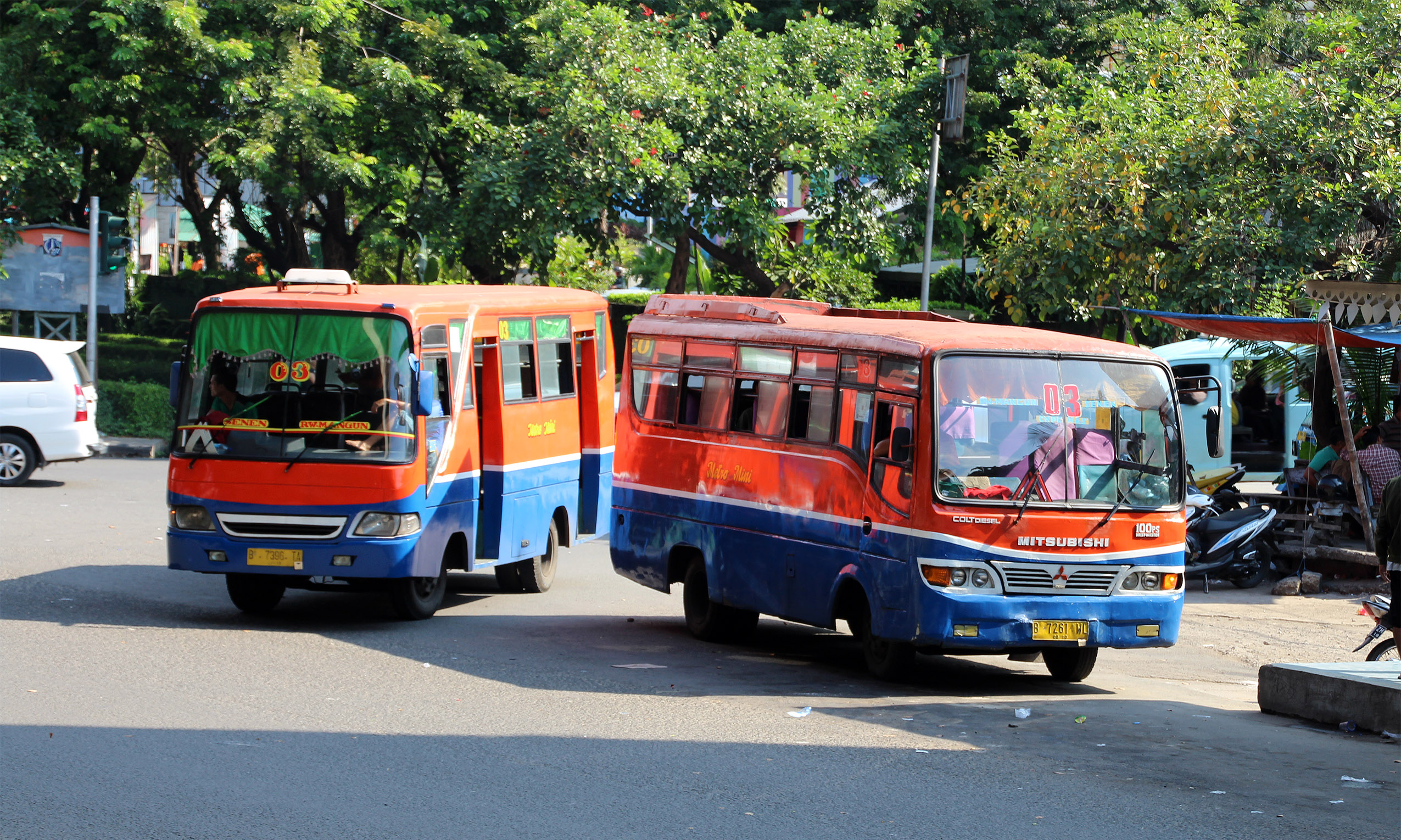
A MetroMini ngetem at Rawasari bus stop while another one is overtaking it.

MetroMini buses are numbered and travel along designated routes. The numbers are sometimes a little hard to spot since they are posted in a somewhat random fashion on the buses, usually on the front and back windows and sometimes (or alternatively) on the side windows as well. There are also designated bus stops but the bus stops are rarely used. Rather, passengers just wave down the slowly travelling passing buses and later just indicate the spot where they wish to alight. Conductors hanging out of the front or rear doors of the minibuses who are often shouting the destination as the buses travel along (such as, "Senen, Senen, Senen" on route Nos 001 to 010 listed below), facilitate these arrangements. For foreign visitors who may be unsure of routes, often the best thing to do is just ask another passenger for directions.

Minibus services often do not adhere to regular travel interval arrangements or schedules. MetroMini drivers often stop for quite a long time at the halte (bus stop) waiting for potential passengers. This practice of halting for a period at bus stops is popularly called ngetem, probably derived from "time" (because the drivers are taking their time). The result is that buses plying the same route often catch up and overtake each other in a rather random way while competing for passengers.

== List of routes ==
The following is the set of routes currently in service. The bus numbers and routes sometime show prefix letters which indicate the following:

- P = Central Jakarta (Jakarta Pusat)
- B = West Jakarta (Jakarta Barat)
- S = South Jakarta (Jakarta Selatan)
- T = East Jakarta (Jakarta Timur)
- U = North Jakarta (Jakarta Utara)

From Pasar Senen

001 Senen - RS Islam Cempaka Putih - Taman Solo

003 Senen - Cempaka Putih - Rawamangun

005 Senen - Johar Baru - Mardani

007 Senen - Cempaka Mas - Semper

010 Senen - Kemayoran - Sunter

011 Senen - Kemayoran - Bendungan Jago

015 Senen - Sabang - Setiabudi

017 Senen - Cikini - Manggarai

047 Senen - Cempaka Putih - Pondok Kopi

From Tanjung Priok

023 Tanjung Priok - Cilincing

024 Tanjung Priok - Sunter - Senen (Now became Transjakarta route 14B)

From Kota

029 Kota - Pademangan - Sunter

030 Kota - Pluit - Muara Angke

From Pulo Gadung

041 Pulo Gadung - Tugu - Tanjung Priok

042 Pulo Gadung - Penggilingan - Perumnas Klender

043 Pulo Gadung - Pondok Ungu - Seroja

044 Pulo Gadung - Penggilingan - Pulo Gebang (Now became Transjakarta route 11D)

045 Pulo Gadung - Jatiwaringin - Pondok Gede (Now became Transjakarta route 4F (extended until Pinang Ranti)

046 Pulo Gadung - Utan Kayu - Kampung Melayu

049 Pulo Gadung - Rawamangun Muka - Utan Kayu - Pramuka - Tambak - Manggarai

From Kampung Melayu

050 Kampung Melayu - Duren Sawit - Perumnas Klender

052 Kampung Melayu - Buaran - Stasiun Cakung (Now became Transjakarta route 11Q)

053 Kampung Melayu - Otista - Dewi Sartika - Condet - Kampung Rambutan

054 Kampung Melayu - Kalimalang - Pondok Kelapa (Now became Transjakarta route 7P (Starting from BKN Cililitan))

506 Kampung Melayu - Klender - Pondok Kopi

783 Kampung Melayu - Kalimalang - Cibubur - Cileungsi

From Manggarai

060 Manggarai - Tebet - Kampung Melayu

061 Manggarai - Bukit Duri - Kampung Melayu

062 Manggarai - Pancoran - Pasar Minggu (Now became Transjakarta route 4B (extended until University of Indonesia))

From Blok M

069 Blok M - Kyai Maja - Kreo - Ciledug

070 Blok M - Pos Pengumben - Joglo (Now became Transjakarta route 8D)

071 Blok M - Tanah Kusir - Kodam Bintaro (Now became Transjakarta route 8E)

072 Blok M - Pasar Mayestik - Radio Dalam - Pondok Indah – Lebak Bulus

074 Blok M - Tanah Kusir - Rempoa (Now became Transjakarta route 1Q)

075 Blok M - Tendean - Warung Buncit - Mampang - Pejaten Barat - Pasar Minggu (Now became Transjakarta route 6U)

076 Blok M - Cilandak - Tol TB. Simatupang - Kampung Rambutan

077 Blok M - Bangka - Mampang - Ragunan Depan

078 Blok M - Mayestik - Kebayoran Lama - Cidodol

079 Blok M - Fatmawati - Lebak Bulus

610 Blok M - Cipete - RS Fatmawati - Pondok Labu (Now became Transjakarta route 1E)

611 Blok M - Pondok Pinang - Pasar Jumat - Lebak Bulus

619 Blok M - Pangeran Antasari - TB Simatupang - RS Fatmawati - Pondok Labu - Cinere

733 Blok M- Bintara - Kranji

811 Blok M - Lebak Bulus - Rempoa - Bintaro

From Kalideres

082 Kalideres - Kamal - Kapuk - Grogol

084 Kalideres - Pluit - Kota

085 Kalideres - Permata Hijau - Lebak Bulus

Other routes

058 Cililitan - Pondok Bambu - Perumnas Klender

064 Pasar Minggu - Kalibata - Cililitan

091 Batusari - Tanjung Duren - Citraland - Grogol - Roxy Mas - Tanah Abang (Now became Transjakarta route 8K(Batusari - Grogol) and 8M(Tanjung Duren - Tanah Abang))

092 Joglo - Kedoya - Jalan Panjang - Daan Mogot - Grogol

640 Pasar Minggu - Pancoran - Gatot Subroto - Thamrin - Tosari - Tanah Abang (Now became Transjakarta route 9D)

719 Lebak Bulus - Pondok Gede - Jatiasih

789 Perumnas Klender - Pulo Gadung - Harapan Indah

792 Perumnas Klender - Pondok Kelapa - Bekasi

== Fatal accidents and incidents ==
- On 7 March 1994, a Metromini with license plate number B-7821-VW majoring Semper-Pasar Senen, sank in Sunter River, North Jakarta. The bus, which was driven at high speed, ran off the road and plunged into Sunter River. A 30 passengers died and a number of other victims who were still alive and injured were treated at Islam Hospital, Medika Griya Hospital and Koja Hospital. Meanwhile, the bodies of those who died were laid to rest at the Cipto Mangunkusumo Hospital mortuary.
