= Cakung =

District in East Jakarta, Indonesia

- District
- Interactive map of Cakung
- Country: Indonesia
- Province: Jakarta
- City: East Jakarta

Area
  - Total: 42.28 km^{2} (16.32 sq mi)

Population (2022)
  - Total: 565,764
  - Density: 13,380/km^{2} (34,660/sq mi)
- Time zone: UTC+7

Cakung is a district (Indonesian: kecamatan) in the administrative city of East Jakarta, Indonesia. The district is roughly bounded by Bekasi Raya Road to the west, the Bekasi Raya Road - Petukangan canal to the north, a portion of Cakung river to the east, and the Jakarta-Bandung-Surabaya railway to the south. A large area in Cakung is allotted to industrial or agricultural use. The Pulo Gadung industrial complex is located in the district. The district is served by Jakarta Outer Ring Road.

The city hall of East Jakarta is located in Pulogebang Administrative Villages in Cakung. Newly built Pulo Gebang Bus Terminal, which is arguably the largest of its kind, is also located in this area.

The Cakung Drain is a flood canal that begins from Cakung, starting at the confluence of Cakung River and Buaran river, flows to the north, and flows out to the Jakarta Bay via Cilincing Administrative Village in Cilincing District of the city of North Jakarta.

== Subdistricts ==
The district of Pesanggrahan is divided into seven subdistricts (kelurahan):

| Name | Area code |
|---|---|
| West Cakung | 13910 |
| East Cakung | 13910 |
| Jatinegara | 13930 |
| Penggilingan | 13940 |
| Pulo Gebang | 13950 |
| Rawa Terate | 13920 |
| Ujung Menteng | 13960 |

== List of important places ==
- East Jakarta City Hall
- Pulogadung Industrial area
- Pulo Gebang Bus Terminal, the largest bus terminal in Southeast Asia. It is integrated with the Jakarta Outer Ring Road. Starting on July 2, 2016 all buses to Central Java, Yogyakarta and East Java depart from Pulogebang bus terminal due to Rawamangun terminal and Pulogadung terminal are closed for the buses. Transjakarta serves Pulo Gebang–Kampung Melayu and Pulogadung–Pulogebang via Penggilingan routes.
- Jakarta Garden City
- J-Sky
