= Bundaran HI Astra (Transjakarta) =

Bus rapid transit station in Jakarta, Indonesia

1 11 Bundaran HI Astra
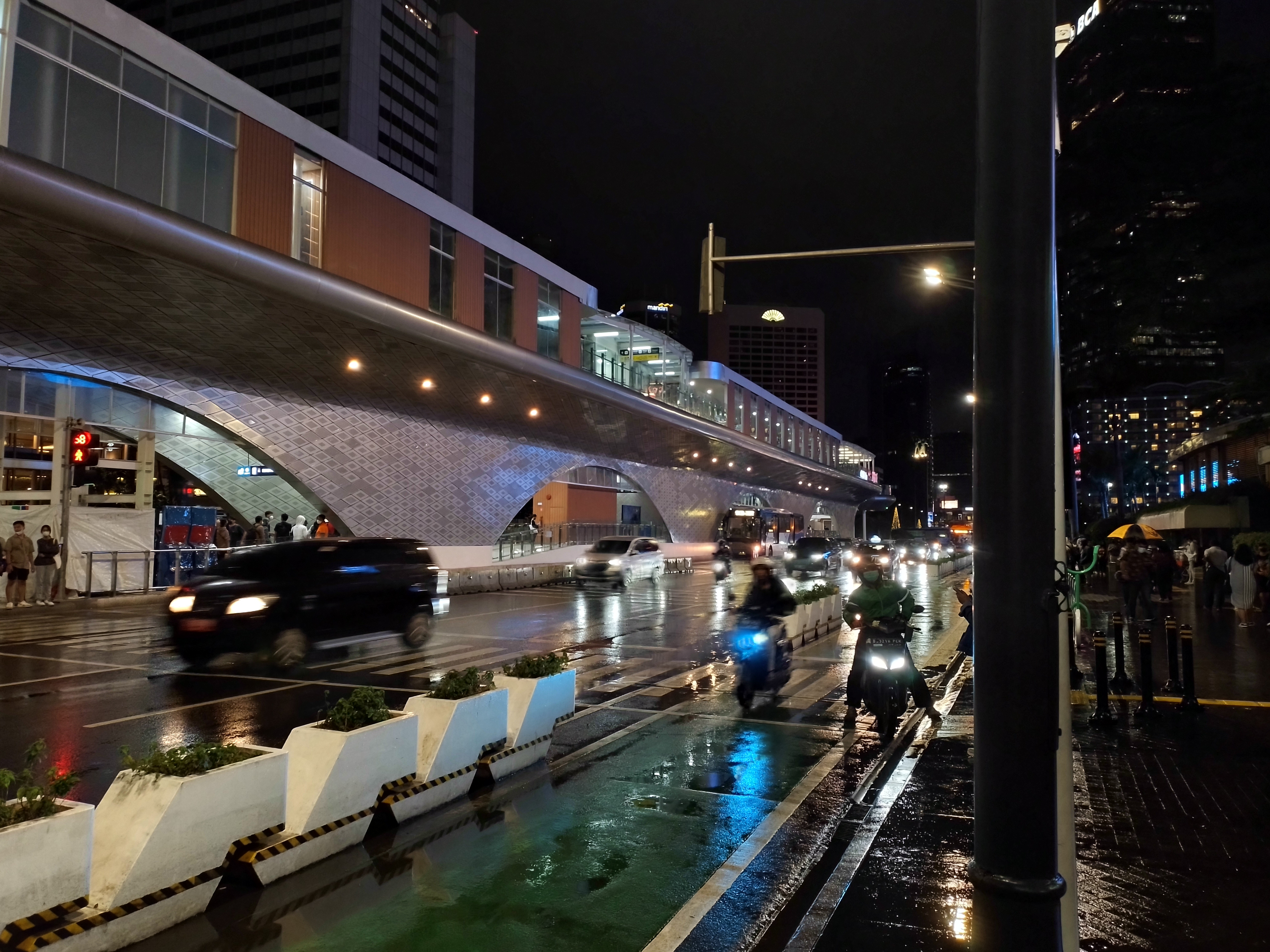
- Northwest view of the station, taken on 28 December 2022

General information
- Location: M.H. Thamrin Street, Gondangdia, Menteng, Central Jakarta 10350, Indonesia
- Coordinates: 6.193605°S 106.823016°E
- System: Transjakarta bus rapid transit station
- Owner: Transjakarta
- Operator: Transjakarta
- Lines: List of Transjakarta corridors#Corridor 1 List of TransJakarta corridors#Cross-corridor routes
- Platforms: Single island platform
- Connections: Bundaran HI Bank Jakarta

Construction
- Structure type: At-grade
- Architect: Kuncara Wicaksana
- Architectural style: Modern • Neo-futurism

Other information
- Status: In service

History
- Opened: 15 January 2004 (soft launching); 1 February 2004 (commercial operation)
- Rebuilt: 2019 (after the MRT construction); 2022 (revitalization)

Services
Preceding		Following
Tosari towards Blok M	Corridor 1	M.H. Thamrin towards Kali Besar
Setiabudi Integritas towards Ragunan	Corridor 6 Route 6A	M.H. Thamrin towards Balai Kota
Tosari towards Ragunan	Corridor 6 Route 6B	M.H. Thamrin towards Balai Kota
Location

Bundaran HI (or Bundaran HI Astra, (Note: Stylized as Bundaran HI ASTRA in all caps) with Astra International granted for naming rights) is a Transjakarta bus rapid transit station on the M.H. Thamrin Street in Jakarta, Indonesia, serving corridor 1. The station's name comes from the Hotel Indonesia Roundabout at south, with the historic Selamat Datang Monument in the epicenter of the circle. More than just being a bus station, Bundaran HI Astra station is also a new tourism spot of Jakarta, thanks to its viewing deck that overlooks the Selamat Datang Monument.

== History ==
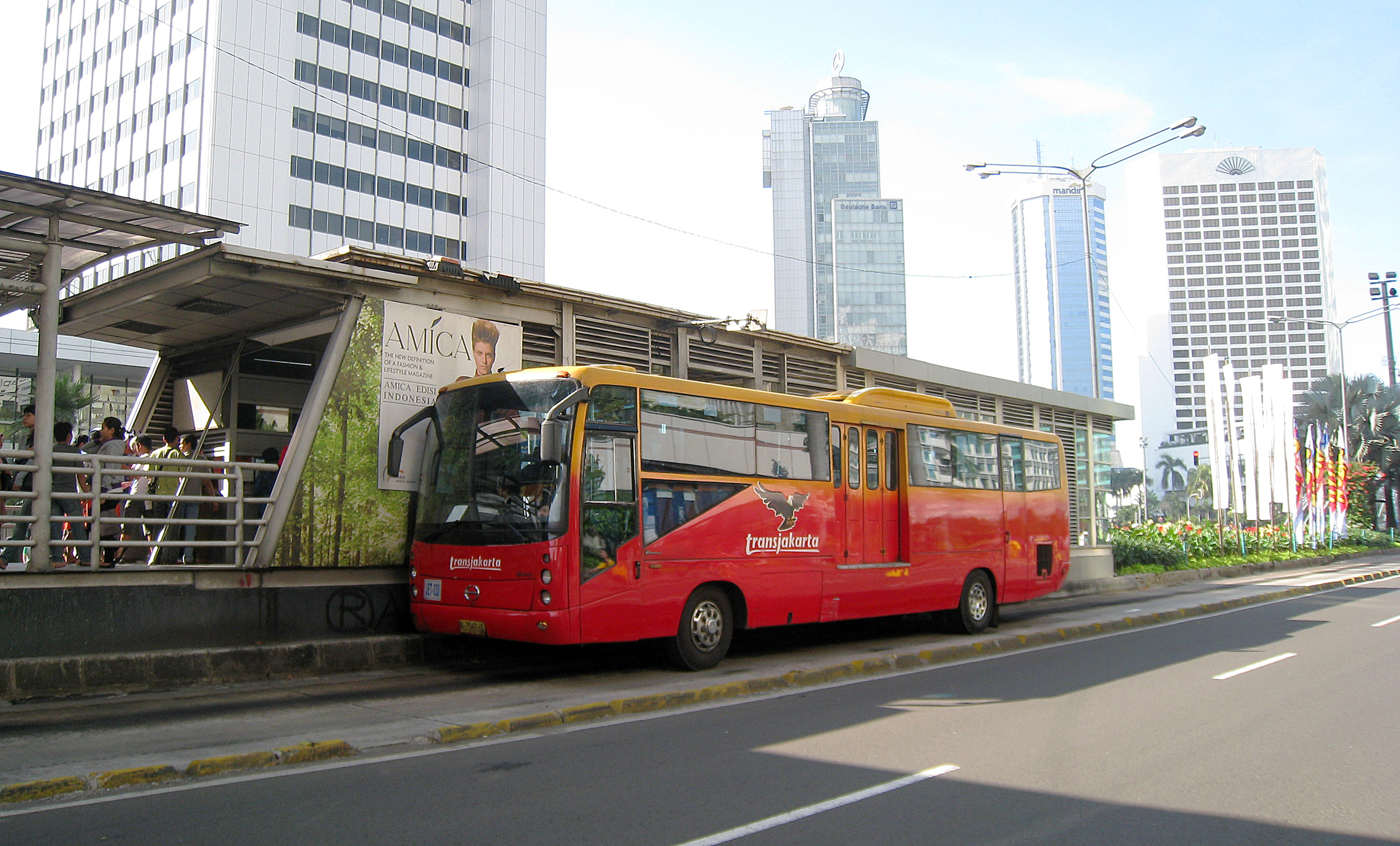
The BRT station in 2010, prior to its demolition in 2014 for the Jakarta MRT construction

The Transjakarta Corridor 1 began its soft operational launch on 15 January 2004, along with all of its stations, including Bundaran HI. The commercial operation of corridor 1 was started on 1 February 2004. The original building had a total of six platform bays (three for each side), and was accessible via pedestrian bridge.

On 6 January 2014, Bundaran HI BRT station was closed for demolition to make way for the construction of the Bundaran HI MRT station beneath it. After the MRT construction completed, the BRT station was reopened on 24 March 2019, and directly integrated with the MRT station opened at the same day. The second building had nine bays (six for each side) and accessible via pelican crossing instead of footbridge.

On 15 April 2022, the Bundaran HI BRT station was closed again for revitalization along with 10 other stations such as Dukuh Atas 1, Tosari, Juanda, Cikoko Stasiun Cawang (now Cikoko), Sarinah (now M.H. Thamrin), Kebon Pala (now Matraman Baru), Kwitang, Balai Kota, Gelora Bung Karno, and Stasiun Jatinegara 2. As an alternative, a shuttle bus route had been prepared to accommodate passengers during the revitalization process. The route was the National Monument (Monas)-Semanggi (1ST) route which operates in corridor 1 until 11 September 2022.

Despite the construction has not yet been fully completed, the third building of Bundaran HI BRT station has started carrying out customer trials on 6 October 2022. It only serves from 05.00 to 21.00. During the trial period, the 2nd floor area of this station and several facilities (including the direct access from the MRT station) could not be utilized by customers. After the Community Activities Restrictions Enforcement (PPKM) was lifted by the Government on 30 December 2022, Bundaran HI bus station began to fully operational 24 hours and the 2nd floor of the bus stop including toilets, prayer rooms (musala) and skydeck. Both sides of the bus station could be accessed freely by Transjakarta customers who access the bus station. The direct access to the MRT station, however, remained closed until it was reopened on 10 July 2023.

From 4 March to 28 May 2023, Bundaran HI bus station served as the temporary terminus of corridor 3 due to the MRT extenstion to Kota Tua, until it was shortened to Monumen Nasional on 29 May.

== Naming rights ==
On 30 June 2022, Transjakarta announced the sale of exclusive naming rights for several BRT stations, including Bundaran HI.

In August 2023, Astra International granted the naming right of Bundaran HI BRT station, making it as the first Transjakarta BRT station—and also the first of its kind in Indonesia—to commercially grant a naming right. Practically, the "ASTRA" brand is gradually juxtaposed with the name of this station on signages, route maps, passenger information system, and Transjakarta's social media platforms.

== Building and layout ==
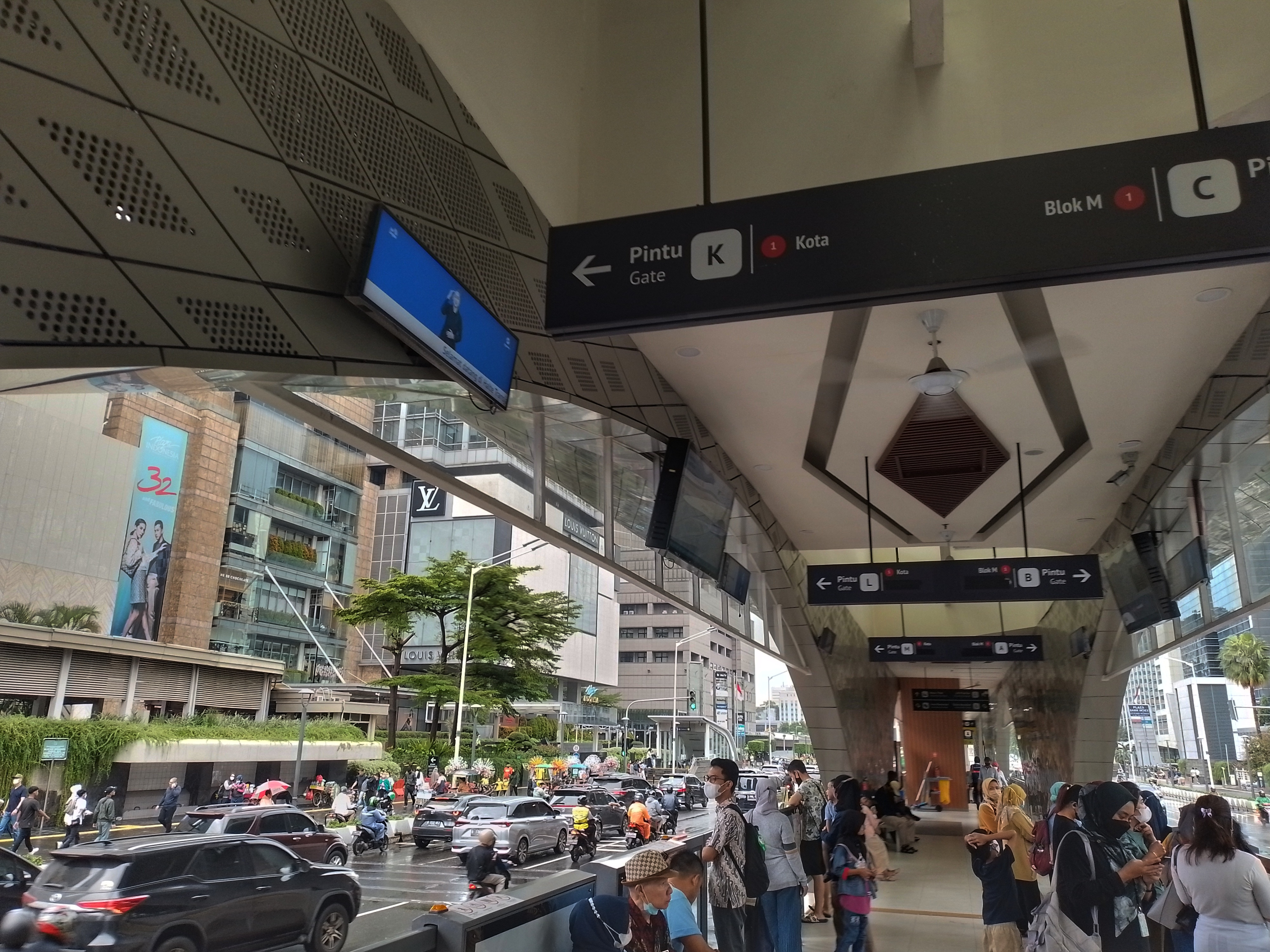
View of the platform area

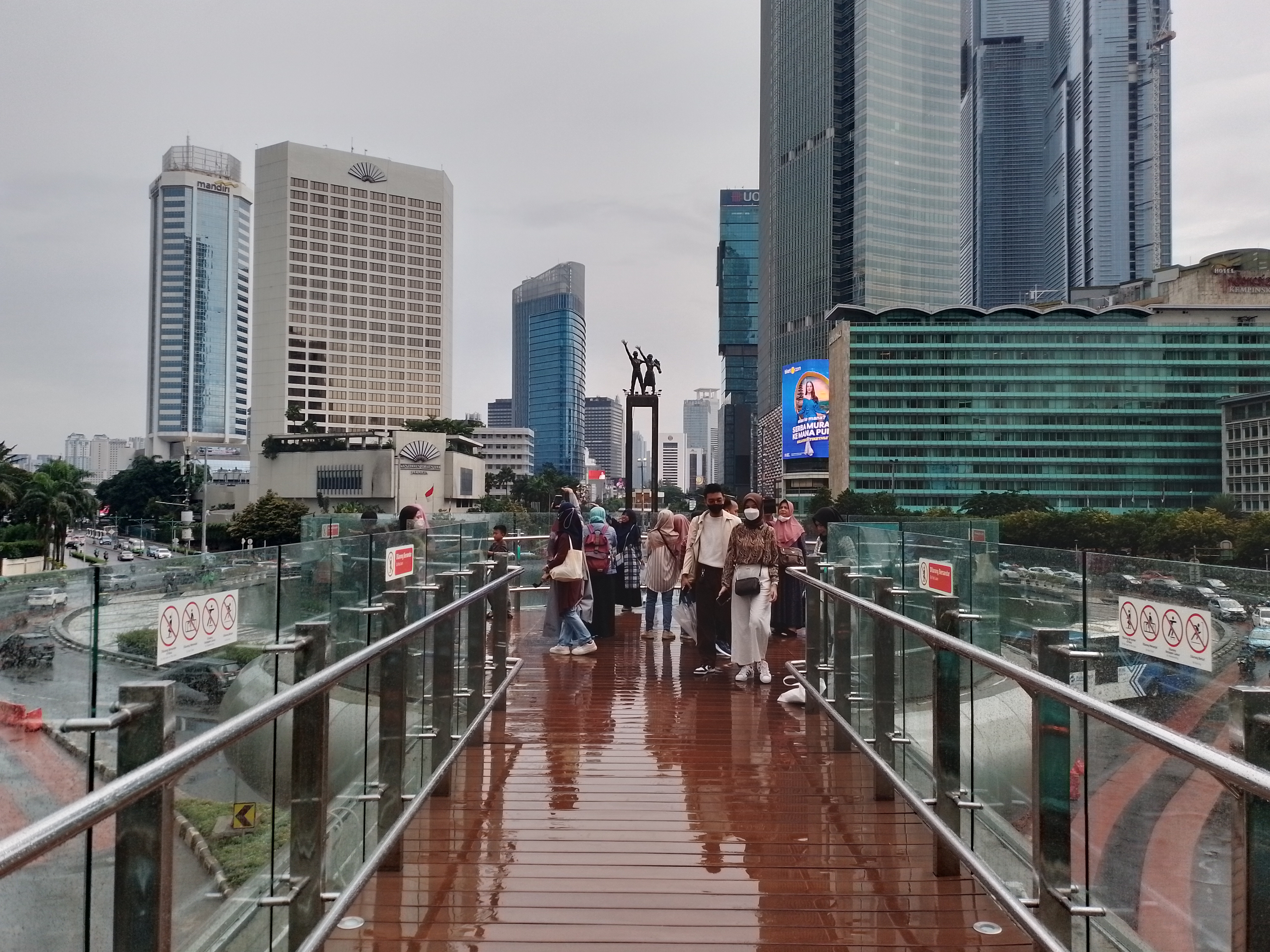
View from the viewing balcony at the southern end of the building, the Selamat Datang Monument can be seen from a distance

The current third building of Bundaran HI Astra BRT station has two floors and resembles a cruise ship, with arch-shaped platforms and batik-inspired facade patterns. The building now has accessible toilets, praying rooms (musala), commercial and waiting areas, which is accessible with escalators and elevators. At the same floor, there are two open-air deck at both north and south ends of the building, with the southern end overlooks the Selamat Datang Monument. An extending viewing balcony is added on the south end to make a closer look to the monument. In the platform level below, the number of platform bays remained nine (six for each side), with the pelican crossing access and connection to the MRT station are located at the northern end of the building.

West	to Kota and to Balai Kota (M.H. Thamrin) →
island platform, the platform doors are opened on the right side of the direction of travel
East	← (Tosari/Setiabudi Integritas) to Blok M and to Ragunan

== Non-BRT bus services ==
The following non-BRT bus services stop around the Bundaran HI Astra station, last updated on 21 August 2025:

Type	Route	Destination	Notes
Inner city feeder		Senen–Blok M	Outside the station
Inner city feeder		Pasar Minggu–Tanah Abang Station	Inside the station
Royaltrans (premium)		Cibubur–Balai Kota	Outside the station
#jakartaexplorer double-decker tour buses		Jakarta Skyscrapers (Pencakar Langit Jakarta)	Outside the station

== Places nearby ==
- Plaza Indonesia
  - Grand Hyatt Jakarta
  - The Plaza Jakarta
  - Keraton at the Plaza
- Indonesia-1 Tower
- Embassy of Japan
- Sinar Mas Land Plaza
- Pertamina Lubricants
- Plaza Bank Index
- Pullman Jakarta Indonesia Thamrin CBD
- Wisma Nusantara

== Criticisms and controversies ==
Because of its large cruise ship-like design, several parties criticized the revitalization of the Bundaran HI BRT station, as it obstructed the view of the Selamat Datang Monument. Historian JJ Rizal had called for an immediate cancelation of the revitalization process, in order to protect the monument's value as "a symbol of Jakarta's transformation from a colonial city into the national capital of a newly-independent Indonesia, and also the warm hospitality of Indonesians." With the provisions of commercial areas in the upper floor, he concerned that the station could "capitalize the monument site as one of the historic legacies of President Sukarno." The revitalization was accused to not include public hearings and consultations with the cultural heritage team, and ignored several architectural procedures.

Despite the outcries, the revitalization of the BRT station continued until it was fully operational by late December 2022. Transjakarta denied accusations of capitalizing or commercialize the Selamat Datang Monument, and the BRT station provides "a new, better point of view for the public to observe the monument, just as did by the buildings surrounding the monument." In the other hand, one of the members of the Henk Ngantung family, former Jakarta Governor and artist who designed the monument, praised the new design of the Bundaran HI BRT station.

== Incidents ==
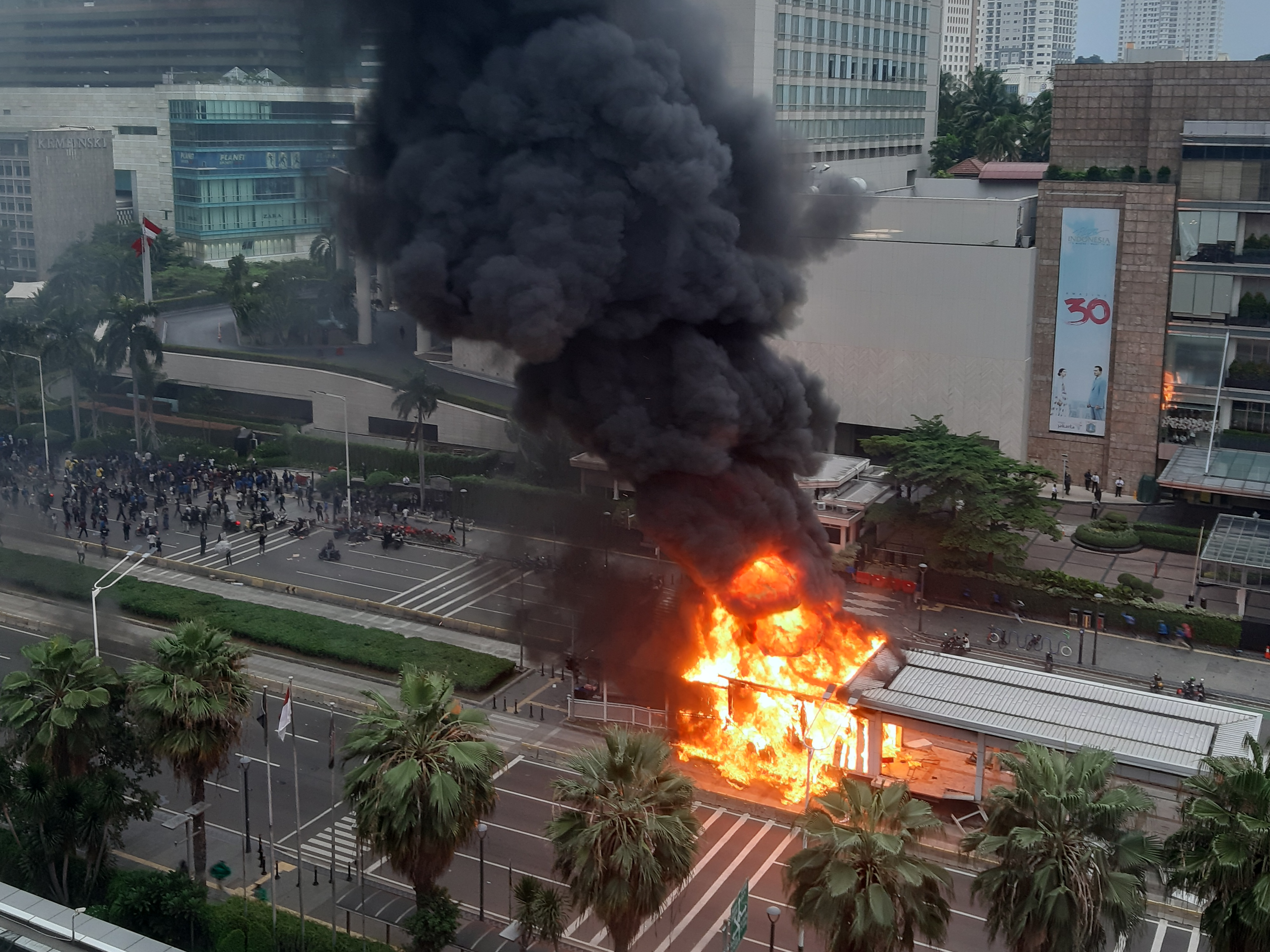
The BRT station on fire during the Omnibus law protests on 8 October 2020

The Bundaran HI BRT station was burned during the Omnibus law protests on 8 October 2020, along with 8 other affected stations. Losses due to this incident were estimated at up to 45 billion rupiah. The incident was very unfortunate considering that this BRT station is strategic as one of the destinations for many commuters heading to the surrounding office/mall complex. After eleven days of reparations, the Bundaran HI BRT station was reopened on 19 October 2020.

== Gallery ==
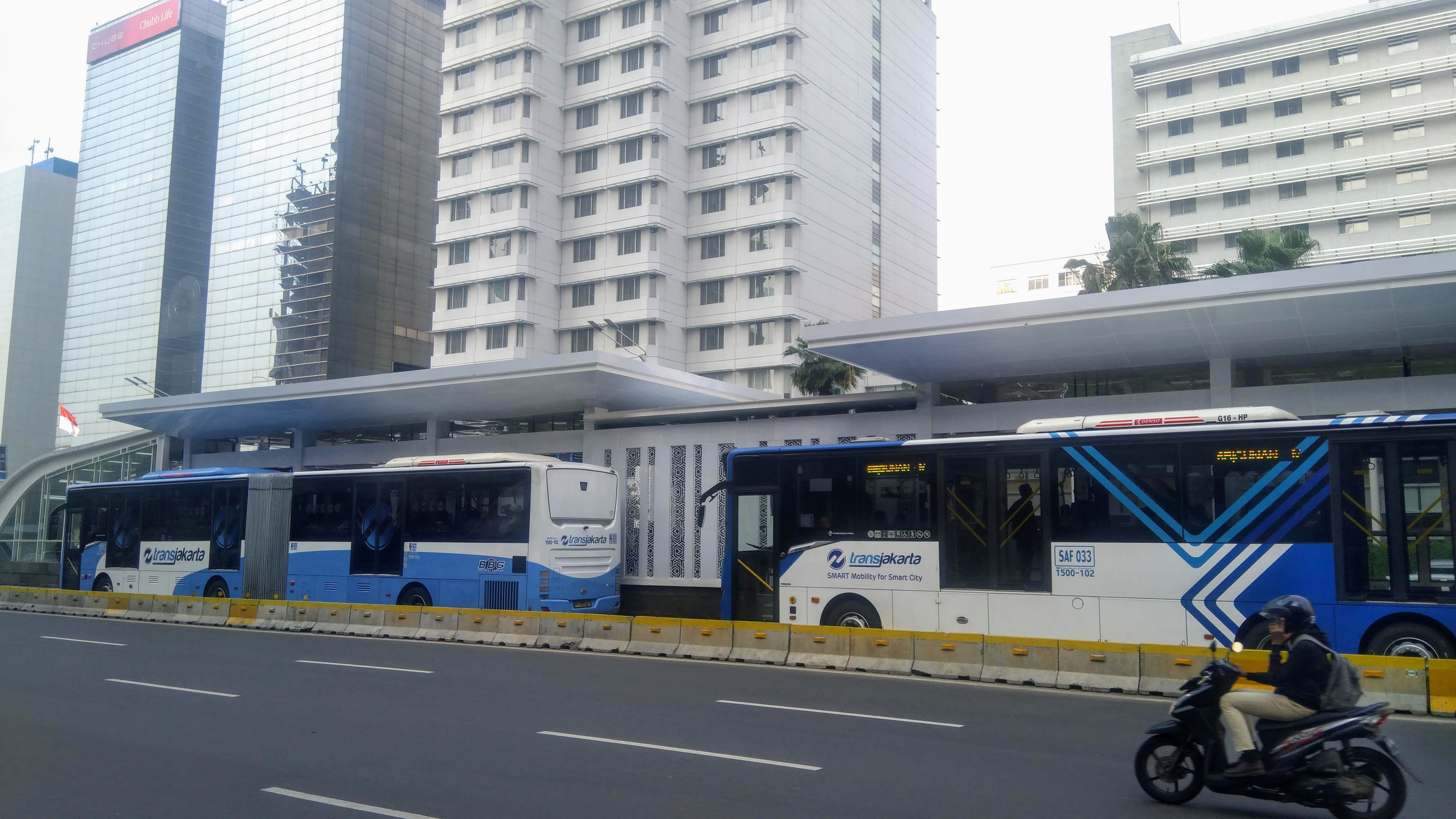
The second generation of Bundaran HI BRT station after its reconstruction in March 2019

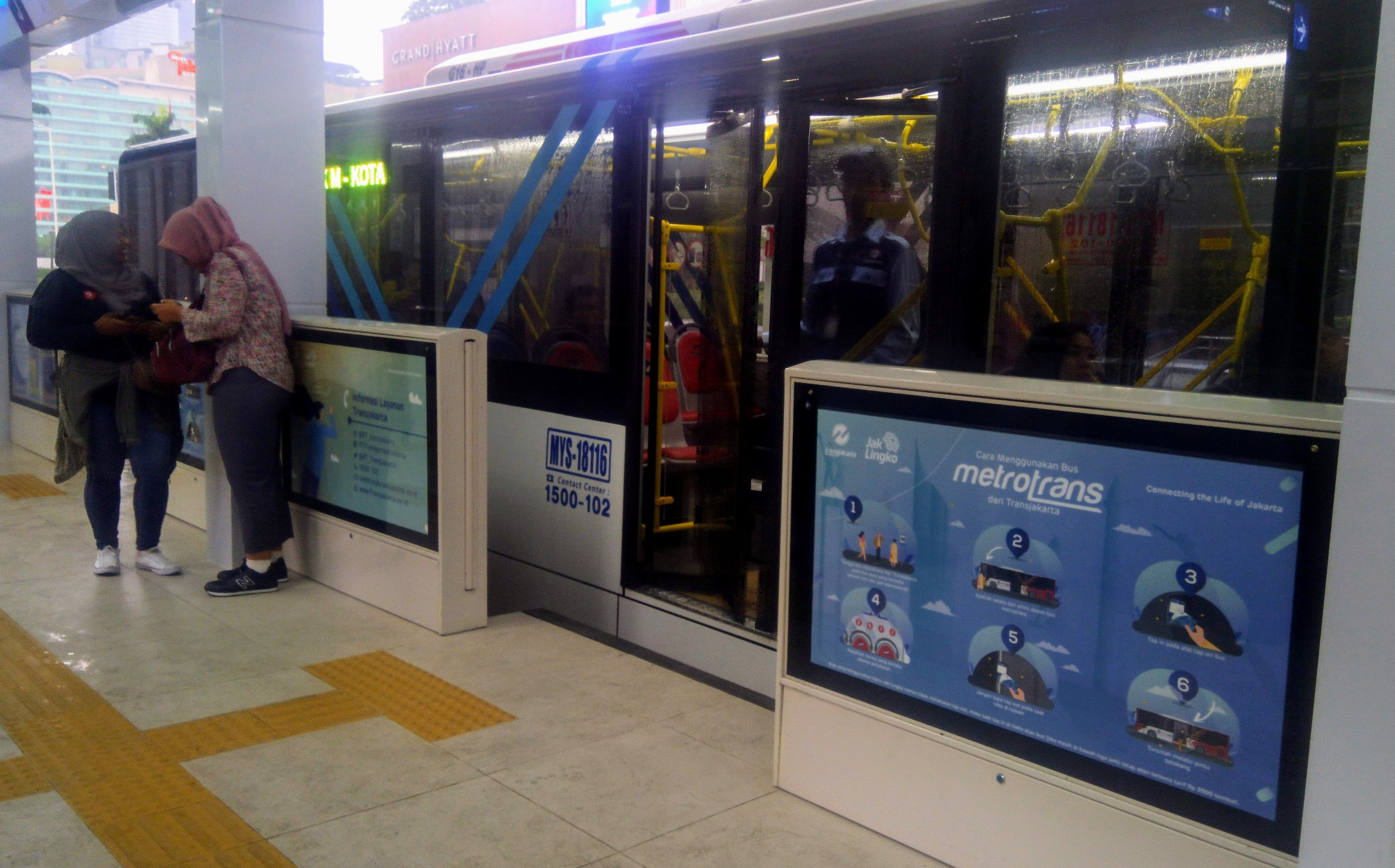
The platform screen doors of the station seen in 2019. These were replaced with simple black trellis after the arson incident in 2020.

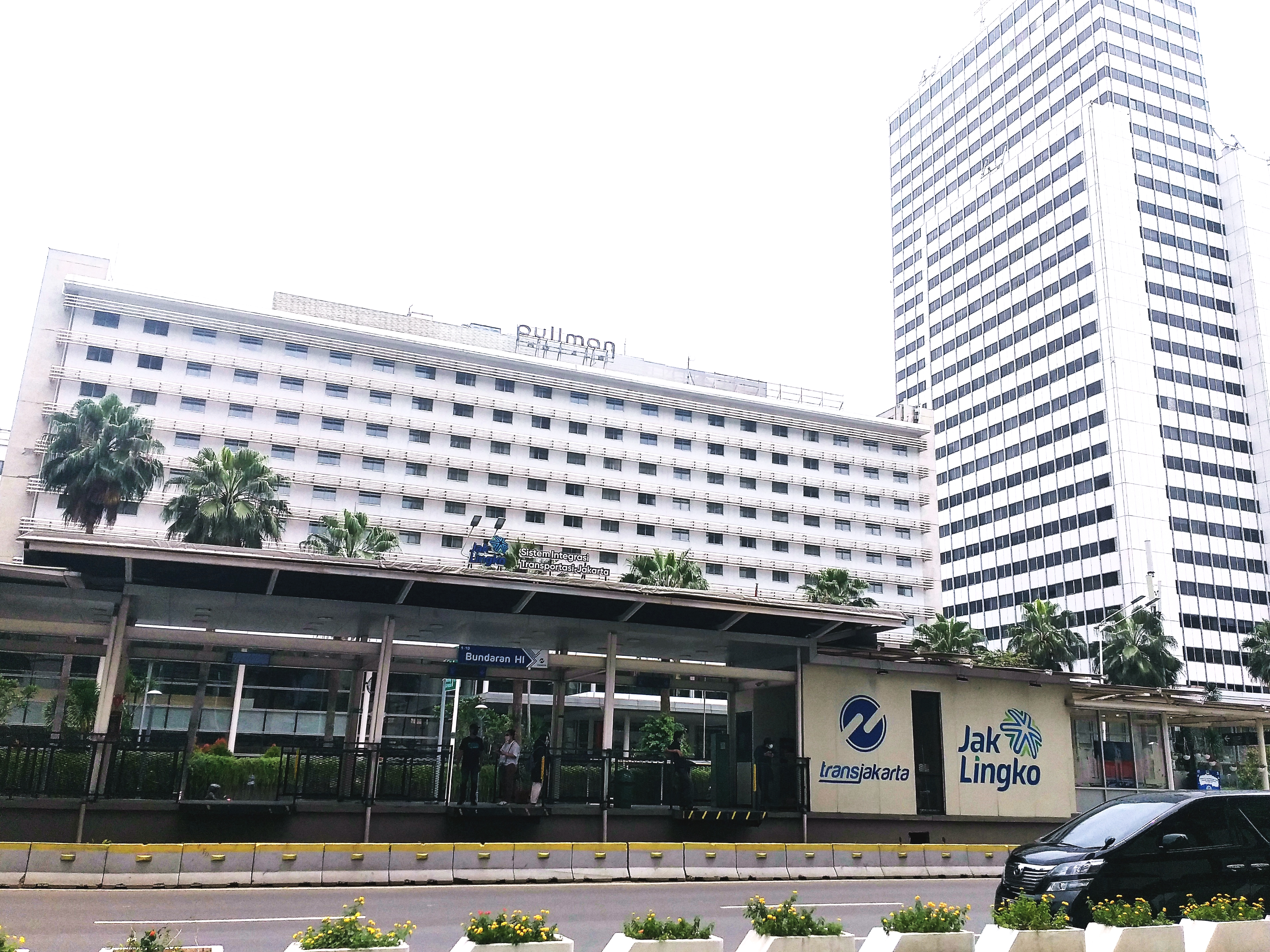
The BRT station prior to revitalization, taken on 24 February 2022. Note that the platform doors had been replaced with black trellis.

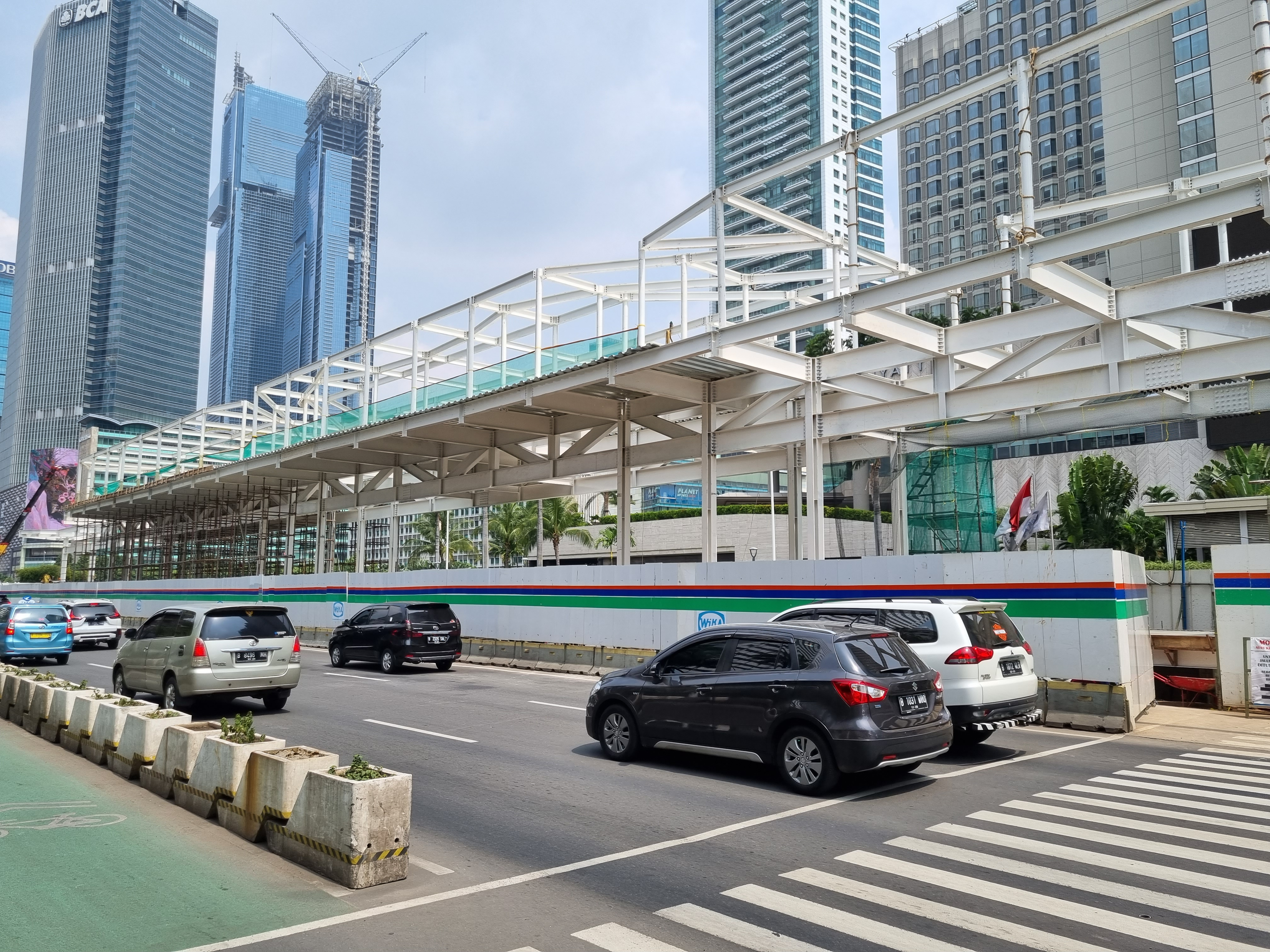
The revitalization progress of the BRT station on 30 July 2022

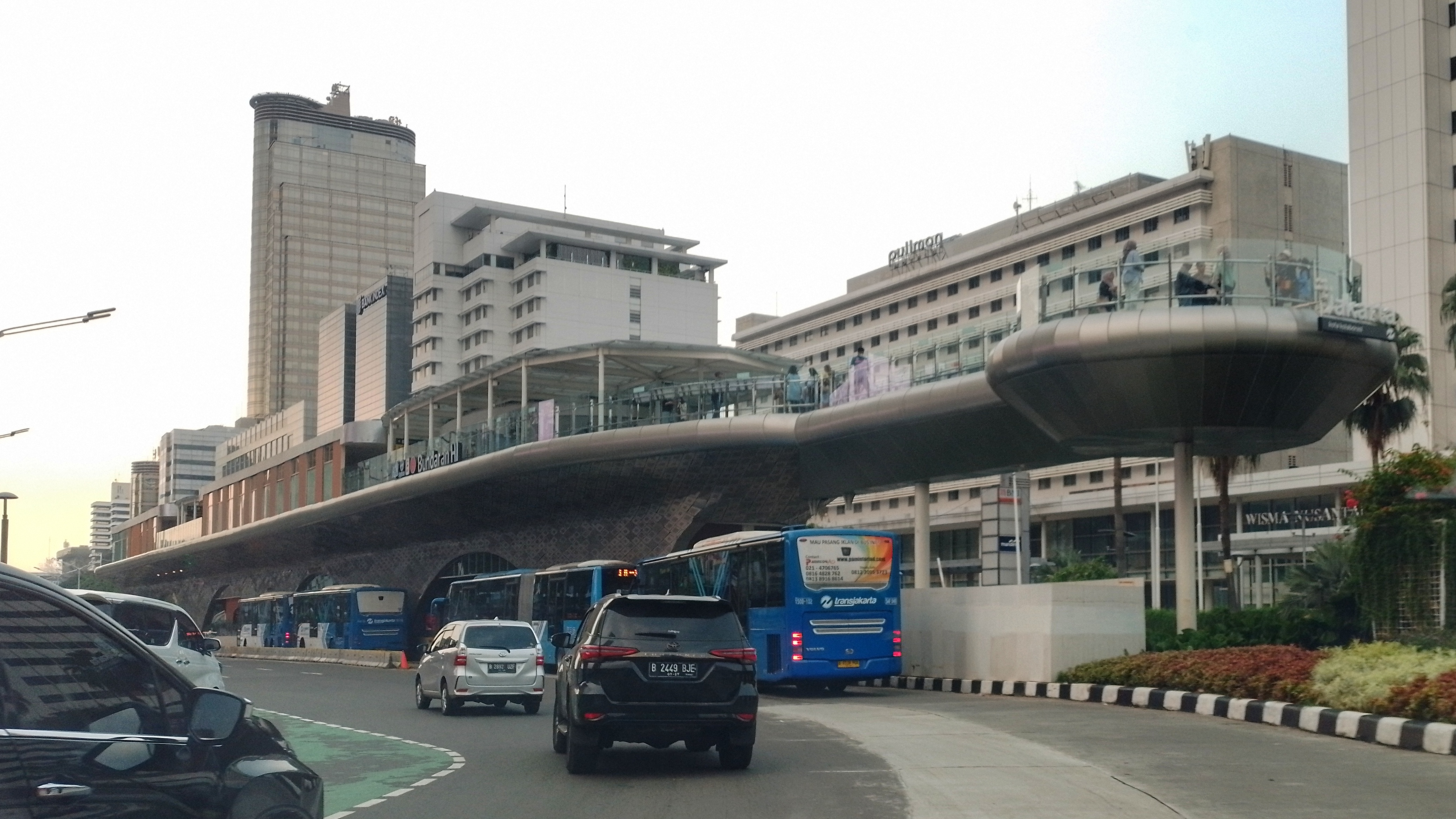
Southwest view of the station

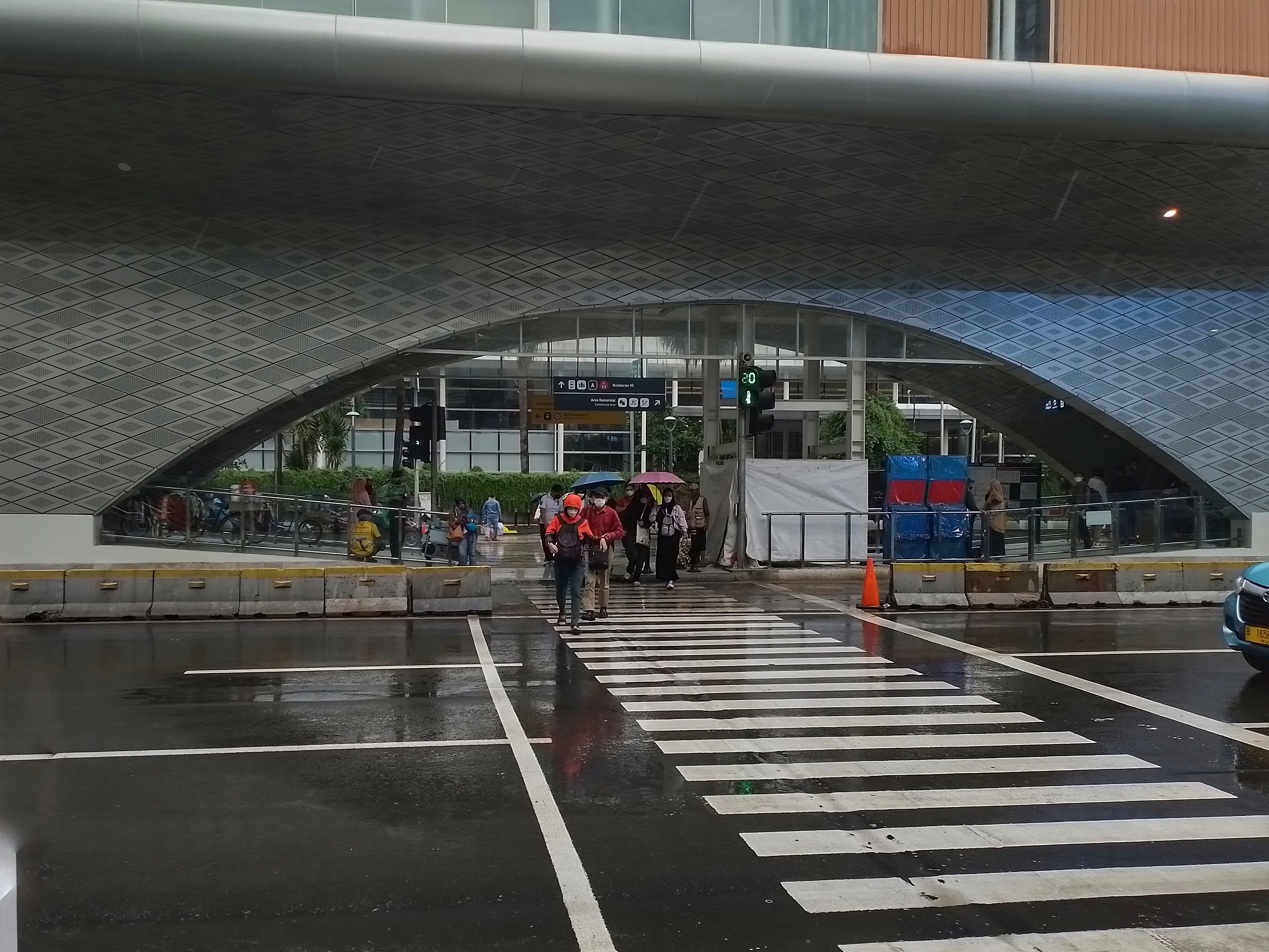
The zebra crossing access to the BRT station

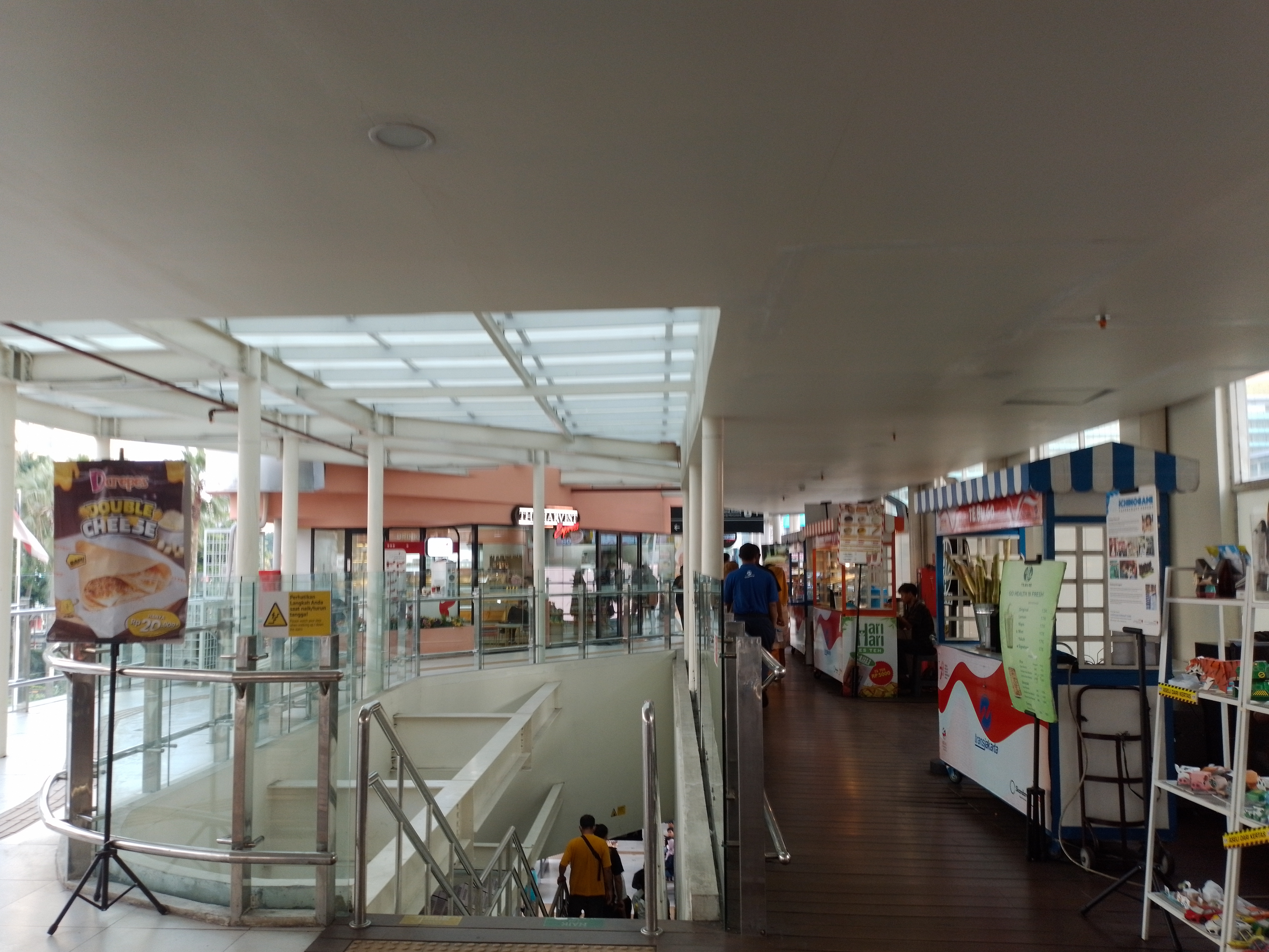
The commercial area on the second

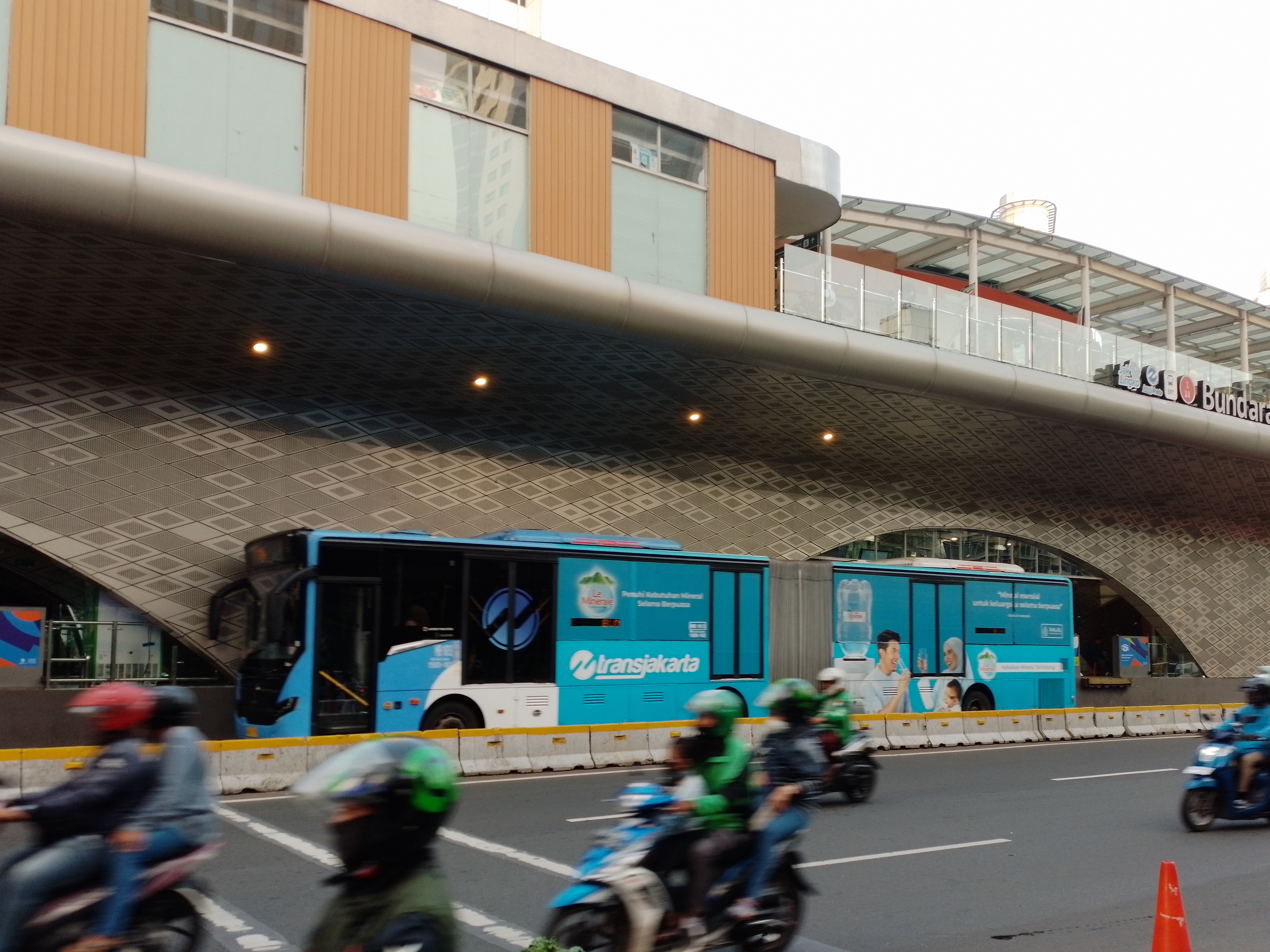
A unit of Transjakarta articulated bus fleet arriving at Bundaran HI

== See also ==
- Bundaran HI Bank Jakarta MRT station, the MRT station below this BRT station
