= Simpang Ragunan Ar-Raudhah (Transjakarta) =

Bus rapid transit station in Jakarta, Indonesia

6 02 Simpang Ragunan Ar-Raudhah
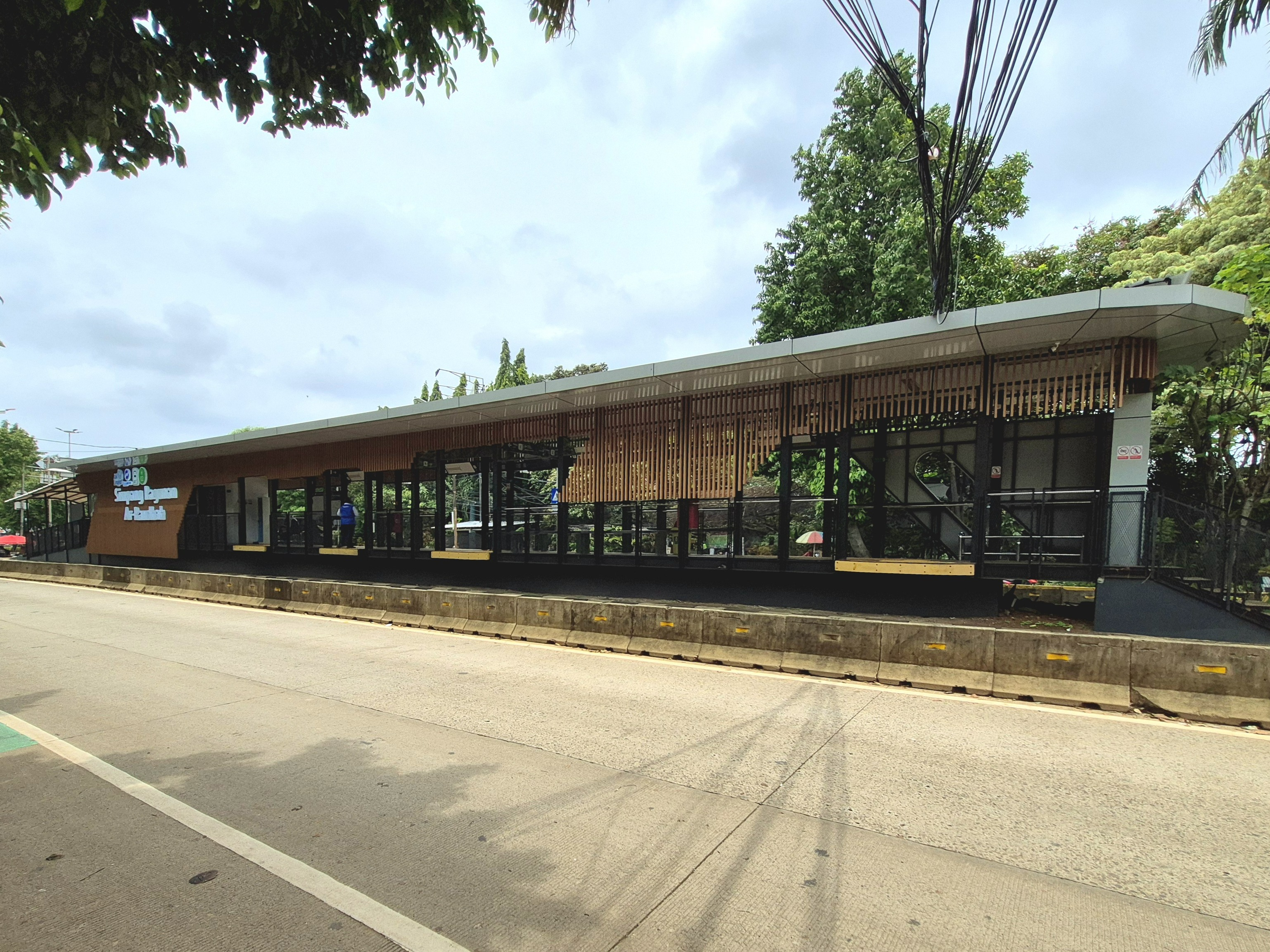
- Exterior looking northeast

General information
- Location: Harsono RM St., Ragunan, Pasar Minggu, South Jakarta, Jakarta, Indonesia
- Coordinates: 6.29447°S 106.82217°E
- System: Transjakarta
- Owner: Transjakarta
- Operator: Transjakarta
- Lines: List of TransJakarta corridors#Corridor 6 List of TransJakarta corridors#Cross-corridor routes
- Platforms: Single island platform

Construction
- Structure type: At-grade
- Cycle facilities: No
- Architectural style: Minimalism

History
- Opened: 27 January 2007
- Rebuilt: 2024
- Former names: Departemen Pertanian

Services
Preceding		Following
Ragunan Terminus	Corridor 6	Jati Barat towards Galunggung
Ragunan Terminus	Corridor 6 Route 6A	Jati Barat towards Balai Kota
Ragunan Terminus	Corridor 6 Route 6B	Jati Barat towards Balai Kota
Ragunan Terminus	Corridor 6 Route 6V	Jati Barat towards Senayan Bank Jakarta
Location

Simpang Ragunan Ar-Raudhah is a Transjakarta bus rapid transit station located at the northern end of Harsono RM Street in Ragunan, Pasar Minggu, South Jakarta, Indonesia, serving Corridor 6. It is named after the junction between Harsono RM, T.B. Simatupang and Warung Jati Barat Streets to the north, and is located adjacent to Jami' Ar-Raudhah Mosque to the west and the Ministry of Agriculture Headquarters to the east.

== Naming ==
The BRT station was originally named Departemen Pertanian (Deptan), the then-incumbent name of the ministry when Corridor 6 commenced operations in 2007. The BRT station name remain unchanged for almost 15 years though the department was renamed "Ministry of Agriculture" in 2009. In January 2024, Departemen Pertanian BRT station was renamed Simpang Ragunan (lit. 'Ragunan Intersection') as an effort to "neutralize" Transjakarta BRT stations from unofficial use of third-party name (including government entities like the Agriculture Ministry).

On 6 September 2024, Acting Governor of Jakarta, Heru Budi Hartono, inaugurated the Jami' Ar-Raudhah Mosque west of the BRT station. Before that, the name "Ar-Raudhah" (Arabic: الروضة, meaning "garden") from the mosque was officially imbued into the station name, thus Simpang Ragunan Ar-Raudhah. Transjakarta stated that it was a not-for-profit naming right deal, which is part of its corporate social responsibility to the mosque's management (a similar practice to such in ASEAN Headquarters MRT station).

== Building and layout ==
Simpang Ragunan Ar-Raudhah BRT station is accessible via zebra crossing at the northern end and has a total of eight platform bays (four in each direction). The unique feature here is that the southernmost pair of bays are placed quiet far from the other bays. The building underwent a renovation between 26 May to 29 June 2024, creating an open-air design compared to the previous closed one. The building now is wrapped with minimalist wooden facades that mimics the Ar-Raudhah Mosque.

West	to Senayan Bank Jakarta	to Galunggung, and to Balai Kota (Jati Barat) →
Island platform, the doors are opened on the right side of the bus travel direction
East	← (Ragunan) to Ragunan

== Non-BRT bus services ==
Service type	Route	Destination	Notes
Inner-city feeder		Kampung Melayu–Ragunan	Outside the station (at Harsono RM St.)
Inner-city feeder		Ragunan–Blok M via Kemang	Inside the station
Inner-city feeder		Kampung Rambutan–Lebak Bulus	Outside the station (at T.B. Simatupang St.)
Inner-city feeder		Kampung Rambutan–Ragunan	Inside the station
Cross-border feeder (Transjabodetabek)		Universitas Indonesia–Lebak Bulus	Outside the station (at T.B. Simatupang St.)
Mikrotrans Jak Lingko	JAK-47	Ciganjur–Pasar Minggu	Outside the station (at T.B. Simatupang St.)

== Nearby places ==
- Jami' Ar-Raudhah Mosque
- Pasar Minggu Regional Public Hospital (Rumah Sakit Umum Daerah (RSUD) Pasar Minggu)
- Ministry of Agriculture
