= Transjakarta Corridor 6 =

Bus rapid transit route in Indonesia

- Ragunan – Galunggung
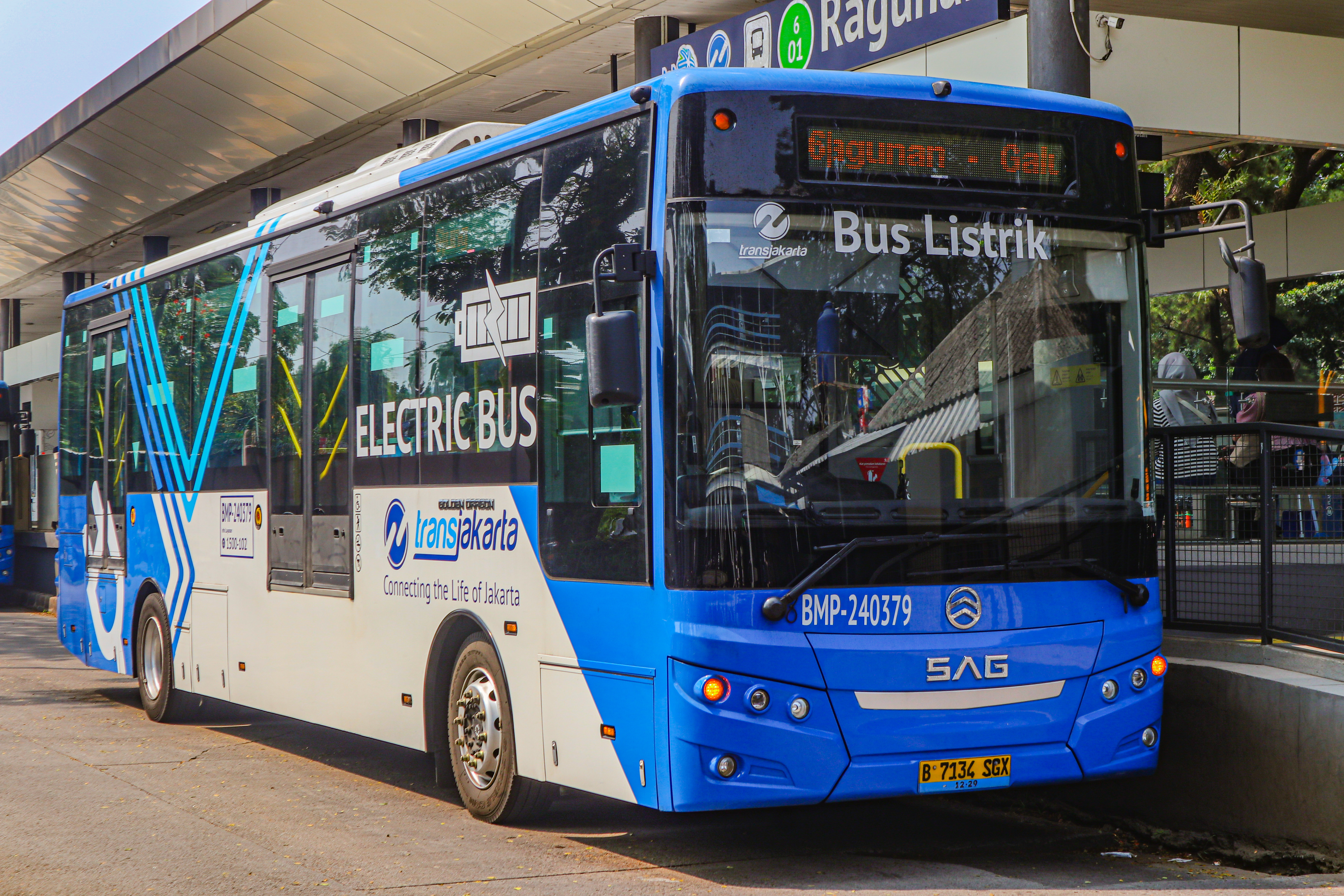
- The SAG Golden Dragon electric bus fleet that serves corridor 6 at Ragunan BRT station

Overview
- System: Transjakarta
- Operator: PT. Transportasi Jakarta (TJ, infrastructures and staffs); Mayasari Bakti (MB/MYS, fleets and drivers); Perum DAMRI (DMR, fleets and drivers); Steady Safe (SAF, fleets and drivers); Bianglala Metropolitan (BMP, fleets and drivers)
- Began service: January 27, 2007

Route
- Route type: Street-level Bus Rapid Transit
- Locale: South Jakarta; Central Jakarta
- Length: 15.90 km
- Stations: 20

Transjakarta Corridor 6 is a bus rapid transit corridor in Jakarta, Indonesia, operated by Transjakarta. It operates from Ragunan to the Galunggung BRT stations within the Dukuh Atas TOD.

The streets that passed by Corridor 6 are Harsono RM, Taman Margasatwa, Warung Jati Barat, Mampang Prapatan, H.R. Rasuna Said, Kendal, Laturharhary, Cimahi, Dokter Kusuma Atmaja, Setiabudi Barat, Setiabudi Tengah, and Galunggung streets. The corridor's main interchange hub is at Galunggung in Dukuh Atas, where it is integrated with the KRL Commuterline at Sudirman railway station and the MRT North–South Line at Dukuh Atas BNI, as well as the Jabodebek LRT that runs parallel with Corridor 6 from Galunggung up to the Kuningan BRT station.

A 35-minute express service between Ragunan and Kuningan is available only at 06:00 - 09:00.

== History ==
=== Early operational ===
Corridor 6 began its trial run in December 2006 and inaugurated on January 27, 2007, along with Corridor 4, 5, and 7. Until c. 2009, the corridor terminates at Halimun BRT station, before it was extended to Dukuh Atas 2 (now Galunggung).

From its early operational in 2007 until c. 2015-2017, Corridor 6 was considered to have poor service, due to of its not roadworthy bus fleets, lackness of park and ride services, lackness of facilities on BRT stations, and unsterilized bus lanes from personal vehicles.

=== Service improvement ===
Since all facilities and services were considered poor, Transjakarta has made a lot of major and minor improvements, one of them by sterilizing the bus lane and revitalizing three BRT stations, Ragunan, SMK 57 (now Jati Barat), and Jati Padang stations in September 2022 which were completed and reopened on December 26, 2022, February 15 and March 4, 2023, respectively. Corridor 6 is no longer considered to have poor service currently.

=== Ragunan–Kuningan express service ===
On May 8, 2023, Transjakarta launched three express services on selected corridors, namely Ragunan–Underpass Kuningan (Corridor 6), Grogol–Semanggi (Corridor 9), and Pluit–Kota (Corridor 12). The express service was launched to accelerate bus time travel during rush hours which only took 35 minutes. The express service only operates from 06:00 to 09:00.

=== Later developments ===
On 29 September 2025, Transjakarta announced that starting from 4 October 2025, Corridor 6 would be rerouted from going through Sultan Agung Street and crossing the railway to going through Cimahi and Dokter Kusuma Atmaja Streets, which meant that it would not be able to stop at Halimun station anymore. Corridor 6 served Halimun station for the very last time on 3 October 2025.

== List of BRT stations ==
- Currently, all stations are served by buses 24 hours a day.
- Stations indicated by a → sign has a one way service towards Galunggung only.

Corridor 6 (Ragunan – Galunggung)
Code	Station name	Transfer/Notes	Bus terminal or train station nearby
Stations in order: From top to bottom (downwards) towards Galunggung (→); from bottom to top (upwards) towards Ragunan (←)
6 01	Ragunan	Ragunan	Ragunan Bus Terminal
6 02	Simpang Ragunan Ar-Raudhah	Simpang Ragunan Ar-Raudhah	Warung Jati (planned)
6 03	Jati Barat	Jati Barat	
6 04	Jati Padang	Jati Padang	
6 05	Pejaten	Pejaten	
6 06	Buncit Indah	Buncit Indah	
6 07	Warung Jati	Warung Jati	
6 08	Warung Buncit	Warung Buncit	
6 09	Duren Tiga	Duren Tiga	
6 10	Mampang Prapatan	Mampang Prapatan	
6 11	Underpass Kuningan	Underpass Kuningan Simpang Kuningan (via skybridge)	
6 12	Patra Kuningan	Patra Kuningan	
6 13	Kuningan	Kuningan	Kuningan
6 14	Rasuna Said	Rasuna Said	Rasuna Said
6 15	Karet Kuningan	Karet Kuningan	
6 16	Kuningan Madya	Kuningan Madya	
6 17	Setiabudi Integritas	Setiabudi Integritas	Setiabudi
6 18	Flyover Kuningan →	Flyover Kuningan	
Towards Ragunan (←) heads straight to Setiabudi
6 19 4 17	Galunggung	Galunggung Dukuh Atas (via skybridge)	Sudirman Dukuh Atas BNI BNI City Dukuh Atas BNI

== Cross-corridor routes ==
=== Route 6A (Ragunan – Balai Kota via Kuningan) ===
- Until February 28, 2023, this route served from Ragunan to the Monas (now Monumen Nasional) BRT station via Kuningan (Jalan H.R. Rasuna Said). From March 1 to November 5, 2023, routes 6A and 6B were shortened to terminate at the M.H. Thamrin BRT station. Both routes were extended to Balai Kota on November 6, 2023.

Route 6A (Ragunan – Balai Kota via Kuningan)
Code	Station name	Transfer/Notes	Bus terminal or train station nearby
Stations in order: From top to bottom (downwards) towards Balai Kota (→); from bottom to top (upwards) towards Ragunan (←)
6 01	Ragunan	Ragunan	Ragunan Bus Terminal
6 02	Simpang Ragunan Ar-Raudhah	Simpang Ragunan Ar-Raudhah	Warung Jati (planned)
6 03	Jati Barat	Jati Barat	
6 04	Jati Padang	Jati Padang	
6 05	Pejaten	Pejaten	
6 06	Buncit Indah	Buncit Indah	
6 07	Warung Jati	Warung Jati	
6 08	Warung Buncit	Warung Buncit	
6 09	Duren Tiga	Duren Tiga	
6 10	Mampang Prapatan	Mampang Prapatan	
6 11	Underpass Kuningan	Underpass Kuningan Simpang Kuningan (via skybridge)	
6 12	Patra Kuningan	Patra Kuningan	
6 13	Kuningan	Kuningan	Kuningan
6 14	Rasuna Said	Rasuna Said	Rasuna Said
6 15	Karet Kuningan	Karet Kuningan	
6 16	Kuningan Madya	Kuningan Madya	
6 17	Setiabudi Integritas	Setiabudi Integritas	Setiabudi
1 11	Bundaran HI Astra	Bundaran HI Astra	Bundaran HI Bank Jakarta
1 12	M.H. Thamrin	M.H. Thamrin	Thamrin (U/C)
1 13	Kebon Sirih	Two separate buildings for opposing directions require exiting paid area to transfer: Northbound: Towards Balai Kota (→); Southbound: Towards Ragunan (←)	Thamrin (U/C)
1 13	Kebon Sirih	Kebon Sirih	Thamrin (U/C)
2 22	Balai Kota	Balai Kota	

=== Route 6B (Ragunan – Balai Kota via Semanggi) ===
- Until February 28, 2023, this route served from Ragunan to the Monas (now Monumen Nasional) BRT station via the Semanggi Interchange (which means the route passes Jalan Jenderal Gatot Subroto and Jalan Jenderal Sudirman). From March 1 to November 5, 2023, routes 6B and 6A were shortened to terminate at the M.H. Thamrin BRT station. Both routes were extended to Balai Kota on November 6, 2023.
- Station indicated by a → sign has a one way service towards Balai Kota only.

Route 6B (Ragunan – Balai Kota via Semanggi)
Code	Station name	Transfer/Notes	Bus terminal or train station nearby
Stations in order: From top to bottom (downwards) towards Balai Kota (→); from bottom to top (upwards) towards Ragunan (←)
6 01	Ragunan	Ragunan	Ragunan Bus Terminal
6 02	Simpang Ragunan Ar-Raudhah	Simpang Ragunan Ar-Raudhah	Warung Jati (planned)
6 03	Jati Barat	Jati Barat	
6 04	Jati Padang	Jati Padang	
6 05	Pejaten	Pejaten	
6 06	Buncit Indah	Buncit Indah	
6 07	Warung Jati	Warung Jati	
6 08	Warung Buncit	Warung Buncit	
6 09	Duren Tiga	Duren Tiga	
6 10	Mampang Prapatan	Mampang Prapatan	
9 12	Denpasar	Two separate buildings for opposing directions require exiting paid area to transfer: Eastbound: Towards Ragunan (←); Westbound: Towards Balai Kota (→)	
9 12	Denpasar	Denpasar	
9 13	Widya Chandra Telkomsel	Two separate buildings for opposing directions require exiting paid area to transfer: Eastbound: Towards Ragunan (←); Westbound: Towards Balai Kota (→)	
9 13	Widya Chandra Telkomsel	Widya Chandra Telkomsel	
9 14	Semanggi →	Semanggi Bendungan Hilir (via skybridge)*)	
Towards Ragunan (←) heads straight to Widya Chandra Telkomsel
1 08	Karet	Karet	
1 09	Dukuh Atas	Dukuh Atas Galunggung (via skybridge)	Sudirman Dukuh Atas BNI BNI City Dukuh Atas BNI
1 10	Tosari	Tosari	Dukuh Atas BNI
1 11	Bundaran HI Astra	Bundaran HI Astra	Bundaran HI Bank Jakarta
1 12	M.H. Thamrin	M.H. Thamrin	Thamrin (U/C)
1 13	Kebon Sirih	Two separate buildings for opposing directions require exiting paid area to transfer: Northbound: Towards Balai Kota (→); Southbound: Towards Ragunan (←)	Thamrin (U/C)
1 13	Kebon Sirih	Kebon Sirih	Thamrin (U/C)
2 22	Balai Kota	Balai Kota	

* Semanggi to Bendungan Hilir BRT station via skywalk bridge which is maybe too steep for disabled person and takes at least 10 minutes walk.

=== Route 6V (Ragunan – Senayan Bank Jakarta) ===
- Stations indicated by a ← sign has a one way service towards Ragunan only.

Route 6V (Ragunan – Senayan Bank Jakarta)
Code	Station name	Transfer/Notes	Bus terminal or train station nearby
Stations in order: From top to bottom (downwards) towards Senayan Bank Jakarta (→); from bottom to top (upwards) towards Ragunan (←)
6 01	Ragunan	Ragunan	Ragunan Bus Terminal
6 02	Simpang Ragunan Ar-Raudhah	Simpang Ragunan Ar-Raudhah	Warung Jati (planned)
6 03	Jati Barat	Jati Barat	
6 04	Jati Padang	Jati Padang	
6 05	Pejaten	Pejaten	
6 06	Buncit Indah	Buncit Indah	
6 07	Warung Jati	Warung Jati	
6 08	Warung Buncit	Warung Buncit	
6 09	Duren Tiga	Duren Tiga	
6 10	Mampang Prapatan	Mampang Prapatan	
13 01	Tegal Mampang	Tegal Mampang	Tegal Parang (transfer outside paid area)
13 02	Rawa Barat	Rawa Barat	
13 03	Pasar Santa	Pasar Santa	
Towards Senayan Bank Jakarta (→) heads straight to Masjid Agung
1 02	ASEAN ←	ASEAN Kejaksaan Agung (via skybridge) CSW 1 (via skybridge)	ASEAN
1 03	Masjid Agung	Masjid Agung	ASEAN
1 04	Bundaran Senayan	Bundaran Senayan	Senayan Mastercard
1 05	Senayan Bank Jakarta	Senayan Bank Jakarta	

== Fleets ==
Information correct as of December 2024

- Mayasari Bakti (MB/MYS):
  - Scania K310IB, white-blue (MYS)
- Perum DAMRI (DMR):
  - Skywell NJL6126BEV BRT e-bus, white-blue
- Bianglala Metropolitan (BMP):
  - SAG Golden Dragon XML6125JEVJ0C3 e-bus, white-blue
  - Mercedes-Benz OH 1626 L A/T, white-blue (also serving as the night bus (22:00–05:00))

== Depots ==
- Mayasari Bakti (MB/MYS):
  - Cijantung
- Perum DAMRI (DMR):
  - Pulo Gadung
- Bianglala Metropolitan (BMP):
  - Ciputat

== See also ==
- Transjakarta
  - List of Transjakarta corridors
