= M.H. Thamrin (Transjakarta) =

Bus rapid transit station in Jakarta, Indonesia

1 12 M.H. Thamrin
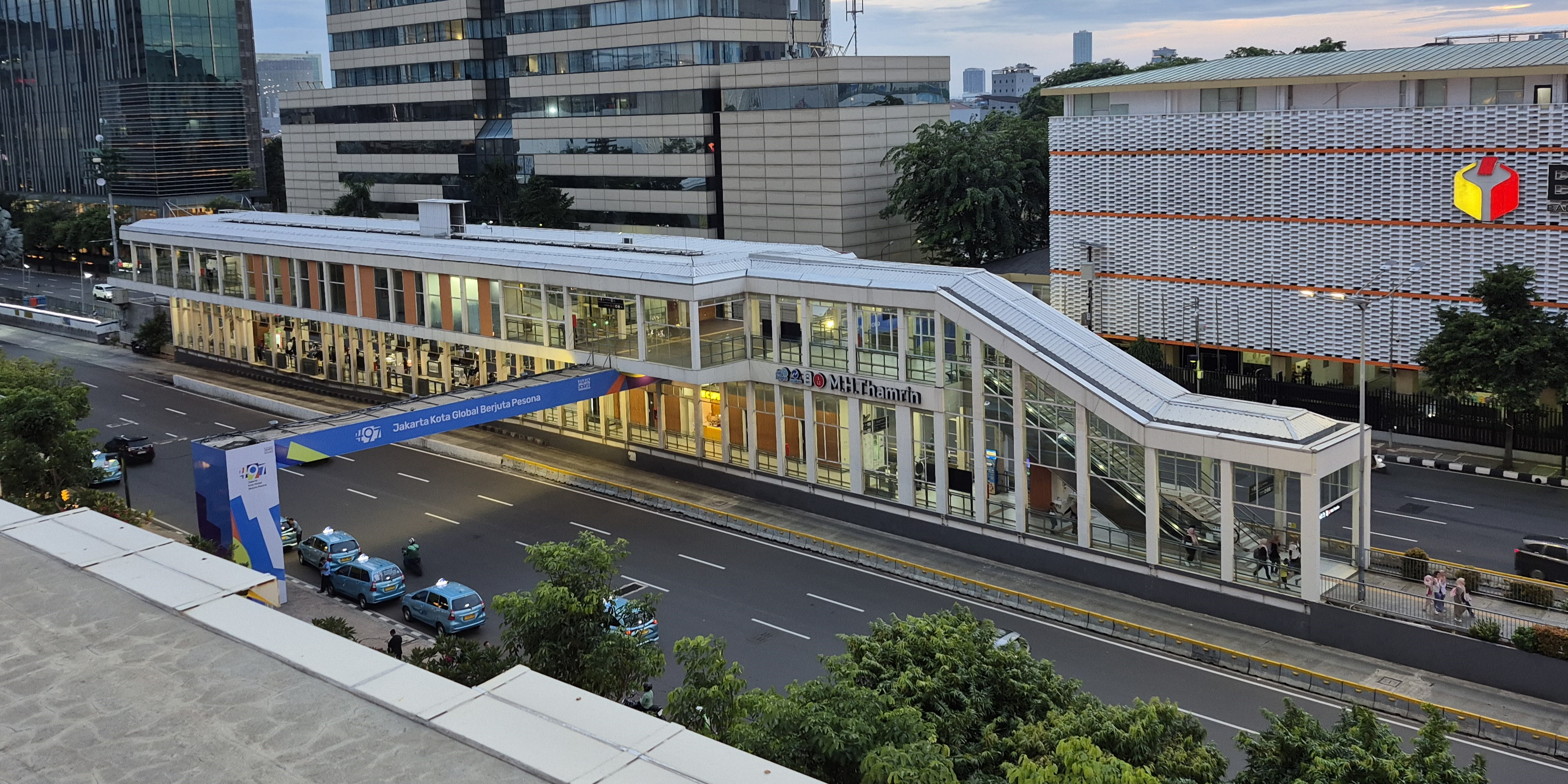
- The building seen from the Sarinah Building balcony, 2024

General information
- Location: M.H. Thamrin Street, Gondangdia, Menteng, Central Jakarta 10350, Indonesia
- Coordinates: 6.18797°S 106.82297°E
- System: Transjakarta bus rapid transit station
- Owner: Transjakarta
- Operator: Transjakarta
- Lines: List of Transjakarta corridors#Corridor 1 List of TransJakarta corridors#Cross-corridor routes
- Platforms: Single island platform

Construction
- Structure type: At-grade
- Cycle facilities: No
- Architect: Kuncara Wicaksana
- Architectural style: Modern • Minimalism

Other information
- Status: In service

History
- Opened: 15 January 2004 (Soft launch); 1 February 2004 (commercial operational)
- Rebuilt: 2022
- Former names: Sarinah

Services
Preceding		Following
Bundaran HI Astra towards Blok M	Corridor 1	Kebon Sirih towards Kali Besar
Bundaran HI Astra towards Ragunan	Corridor 6 Route 6A	Kebon Sirih towards Balai Kota
Bundaran HI Astra towards Ragunan	Corridor 6 Route 6B	Kebon Sirih towards Balai Kota
Location

M.H. Thamrin (formerly Sarinah) is a Transjakarta bus rapid transit station located at M.H. Thamrin street, Jakarta, Indonesia which serves corridor 1. This station is named after Mohammad Husni Thamrin, one of the national heroes of Indonesia from Jakarta, hence the name of the street where this station is located. The station is planned to be connected with the adjacent Sarinah Building via pedestrian bridge.

== History ==
This station was formerly named Sarinah because it is located at the front of Sarinah Building. The operational began on 15 January 2004, along with the soft launching of corridor 1. In 2014, the BRT station building was extended to meet the increase of passenger occupancy, with the platform bays on each direction increased from three to six.

Until 2018, this station was only accessible via pedestrian bridge, which was considered to be the first of its kind in Indonesia, equipped with elevators for disabled people access, but had been left malfunctioned and abandoned for a long time. In August 2018, a ramp access from the zebra cross at the Sarinah intersection north of the station was opened to replace the abandoned elevators on the bridge. The bridge co-existed with the zebra crossing access ramp until the BRT station was revitalized between 2022-2023.

A major revitalization of this station was conducted on 15 April 2022, along with ten other stations in different corridors, aimed to improve service qualities and making it as one of Transjakarta's iconic station. To accommodate passengers affected by the revitalization, Transjakarta operates a temporary shuttle bus route between the Semanggi Interchange and the National Monument until 11 September 2022. Once completed, the station was reopened with a new name "M.H. Thamrin" on 4 March 2023, alongside Dukuh Atas 1, Juanda, and Jatipadang BRT stations. The pedestrian bridge, however, was left disused after the revitalization and covered by thematic banners, as its roof, fence and stairs were removed during the process. The bridge was later revitalized and reopened on 2 March 2026, reinstating its co-existence with the zebra crossing ramp.

== Building and layout ==
The new building of the station has two floors with a touch of cultural heritage. This can be seen from its minimalist architecture that mimics the renovated Sarinah Building. The station is overall painted in beige with brown wood panels in some parts and predominantly covered with glass walls. There is also an escalator at the entrance for direct access to the second floor, which functions as a concourse and house several amenities like toilets and prayer room (musala). The platform bays remained six on each direction. The station is connected via access ramp to the zebra crossing to the north and also via pedestrian bridge that is only accessible through disabled-friendly elevators instead of stairs.

West	to Kota and to Balai Kota (Kebon Sirih/Balai Kota) →
Island platform, the platform doors are opened on the right side of the direction of travel
East	← (Bundaran HI Astra) to Blok M and to Ragunan

== Non-BRT bus services ==
Type	Route	Destination	Notes
Inner city feeder		Senen–Blok M	Outside the station
Inner city feeder		Pasar Minggu–Tanah Abang Station	Inside the station
Royaltrans (premium)		Cibubur–Balai Kota	Outside the station
#jakartaexplorer double-decker tour buses		Jakarta Skyscrapers (Pencakar Langit Jakarta)	Outside the station

== Places nearby ==
- Gedung Jaya
- Menara Cakrawala
  - Djakarta Theatre
- Menara Thamrin
  - Lintasarta headquarters
  - Embassy of Argentina
- Menara Topas
- Sarinah Building
- Sari Pacific Hotel
- Ibis Hotel Sarinah
- Thamrin Acadia
- General Election Supervisory Agency
- BPPT building
  - Coordinating Ministry for Infrastructure and Regional Development
  - National Research and Innovation Agency
  - National Standardization Agency
- Embassy of France

== Incident ==
During the omnibus law protest on 8 October 2020, the then-named Sarinah BRT station was burned by some agent provocateur, along with Harmoni, Bundaran HI, Tosari, and Karet Sudirman stations on corridor 1. The burning caused losses up to IDR 48 billion.
