= Ragunan (Transjakarta) =

Bus rapid transit station in Jakarta, Indonesia

6 01 Ragunan
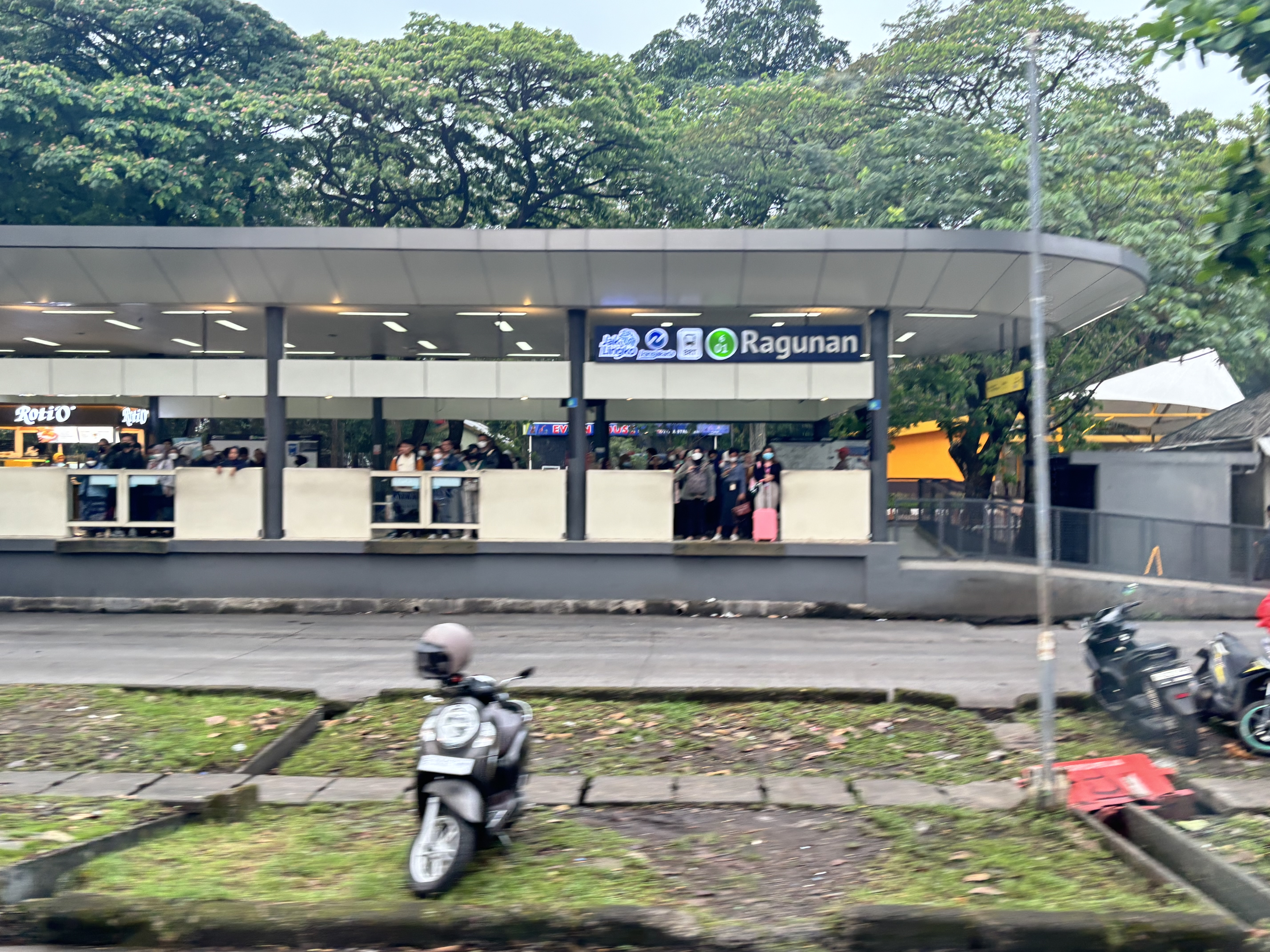

General information
- Location: Ragunan Zoo, Harsono RM Street, Ragunan, Pasar Minggu, South Jakarta 12550, Indonesia
- Coordinates: 6.30499°S 106.8205°E
- System: Transjakarta bus rapid transit station
- Owner: Transjakarta
- Operator: Transjakarta
- Lines: List of TransJakarta corridors#Corridor 6 List of TransJakarta corridors#Cross-corridor routes
- Platforms: Single side platform

Construction
- Structure type: At-grade

Other information
- Status: In service

History
- Opened: 27 January 2007
- Rebuilt: 26 December 2022; 3 years ago

Services
| Preceding | | Following |
|---|---|---|
| Terminus | Corridor 6 Terminus | Simpang Ragunan Ar-Raudhah towards Galunggung |
| Terminus | Corridor 6 Route 6A Terminus | Simpang Ragunan Ar-Raudhah towards Balai Kota |
| Terminus | Corridor 6 Route 6B Terminus | Simpang Ragunan Ar-Raudhah towards Balai Kota |
| Terminus | Corridor 6 Route 6V Terminus | Simpang Ragunan Ar-Raudhah towards Senayan Bank Jakarta |
Location

Ragunan is a Transjakarta bus rapid transit station located in Ragunan Bus Terminal, Ragunan, Pasar Minggu, South Jakarta. It is the southern terminus of Corridor 6, as well as the southernmost station on the BRT network. The station serves the Ragunan Zoo, Ragunan Bus Terminal, and their surrounding areas.

== History ==
The station opened on 27 January 2007 on the launch day of Corridor 6. It originally comprised two separate structures: the western building, which had a side platform with four gates for departure. The eastern side had no platform barriers and was for arrivals only. The two structures are linked with a ramp.

On 7 September 2022, the station was planned to be closed for revitalisation works. The closure was carried out the next day, alongside numerous other stations that week. A temporary structure was in operation to serve BRT services, while non-BRT services continued to terminate and depart from the terminal area, except Service 7E, which terminated in front of Pasar Minggu Regional General Hospital (Rumah Sakit Umum Daerah (RSUD) Pasar Rebo). Transjakarta also operated a shuttle service 6ST.

The station reopened on 26 December 2022. Shuttle service 6ST continued to operate until 8 January 2023.

== Building and layout ==
After a three-month-long revitalisation works, the station reopened on 26 December 2022. The new station has a new design with more lights and new entrances. The new station is much bigger to facilitate new amenities, such as priority toilets, a prayer room, and a driver's room. The new western and middle exits are also step-free and lead directly to the Ragunan Zoo. The new station has eight bus bays. Five western bus bays, labelled A to E, are used for boarding, while the remaining three are used for arrivals.

A new station structure was constructed at the northern end of the existing station prior to revitalisation, used solely for non-BRT services such as 5N and 6R (the latter is no longer in operation). It had three gates facing north, but another side platform was constructed on the southern side. They are now abandoned and no longer in use, but are not demolished.

The following is the layout of Ragunan station based on the BRT services served, last updated on 4 July 2025:

| North | ↱ (Simpang Ragunan Ar-Raudhah) | towards Galunggung and towards Balai Kota | towards Balai Kota and towards Senayan Bank Jakarta | Arrivals only |
Side platform, doors open on the left
South

== Non-BRT bus services ==
The following non-BRT bus services serve Ragunan Bus Terminal, last updated on 4 July 2025:

| Type | Route | Destination | Notes |
|---|---|---|---|
| Inner city feeder | | Kampung Melayu—Ragunan | Inside the station |
| Inner city feeder | | Ragunan—Blok M via Kemang | Inside the station |
| Inner city feeder | | Kampung Rambutan—Ragunan | Inside the station |
| Mikrotrans Jak Lingko | JAK 45 | Lebak Bulus—Ragunan | Outside the station |

== Places nearby ==
- Ragunan Zoo
- Ragunan Sports Complex

== Gallery ==
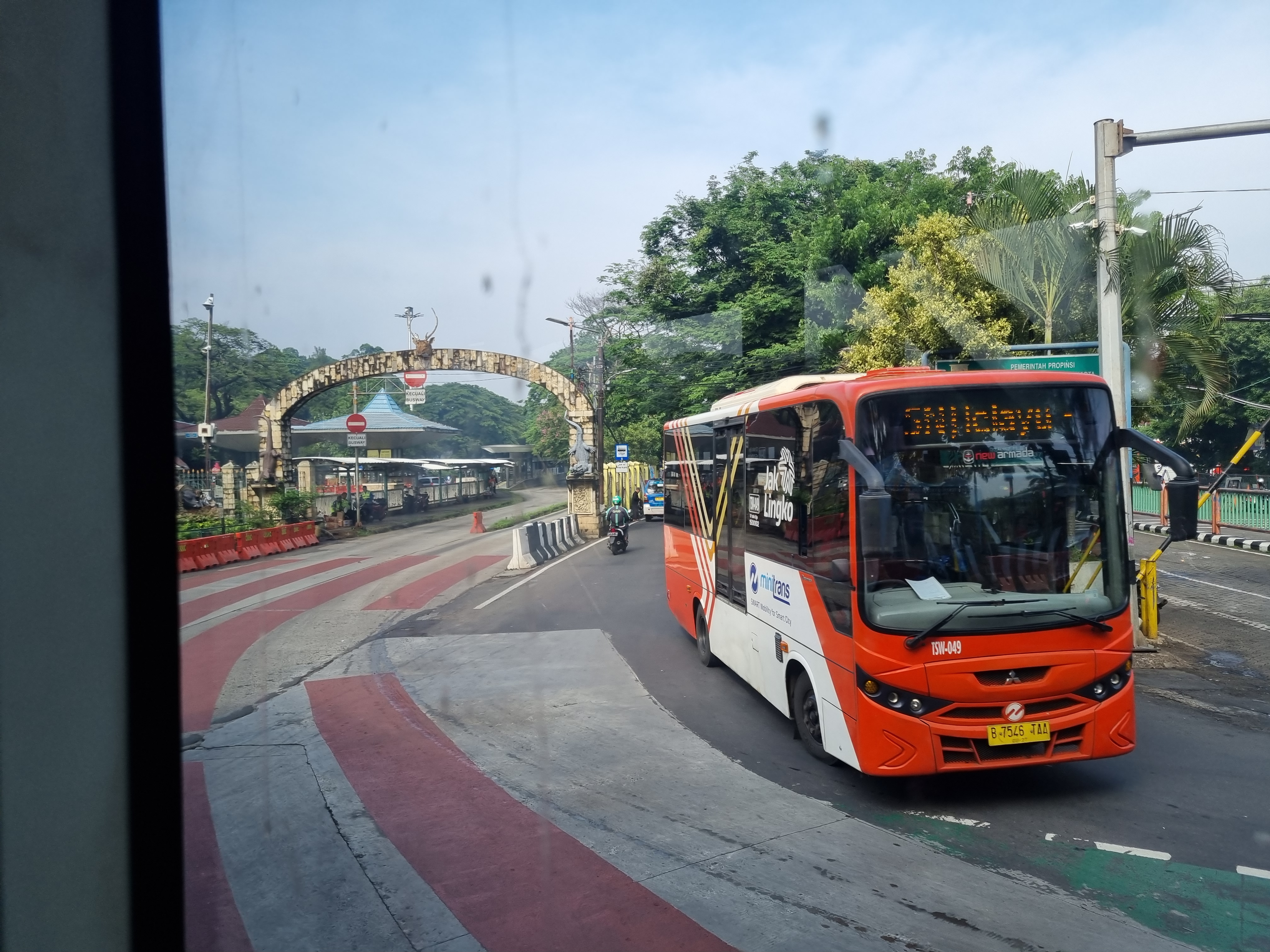
Entrance to Ragunan Bus Terminal, 2024.

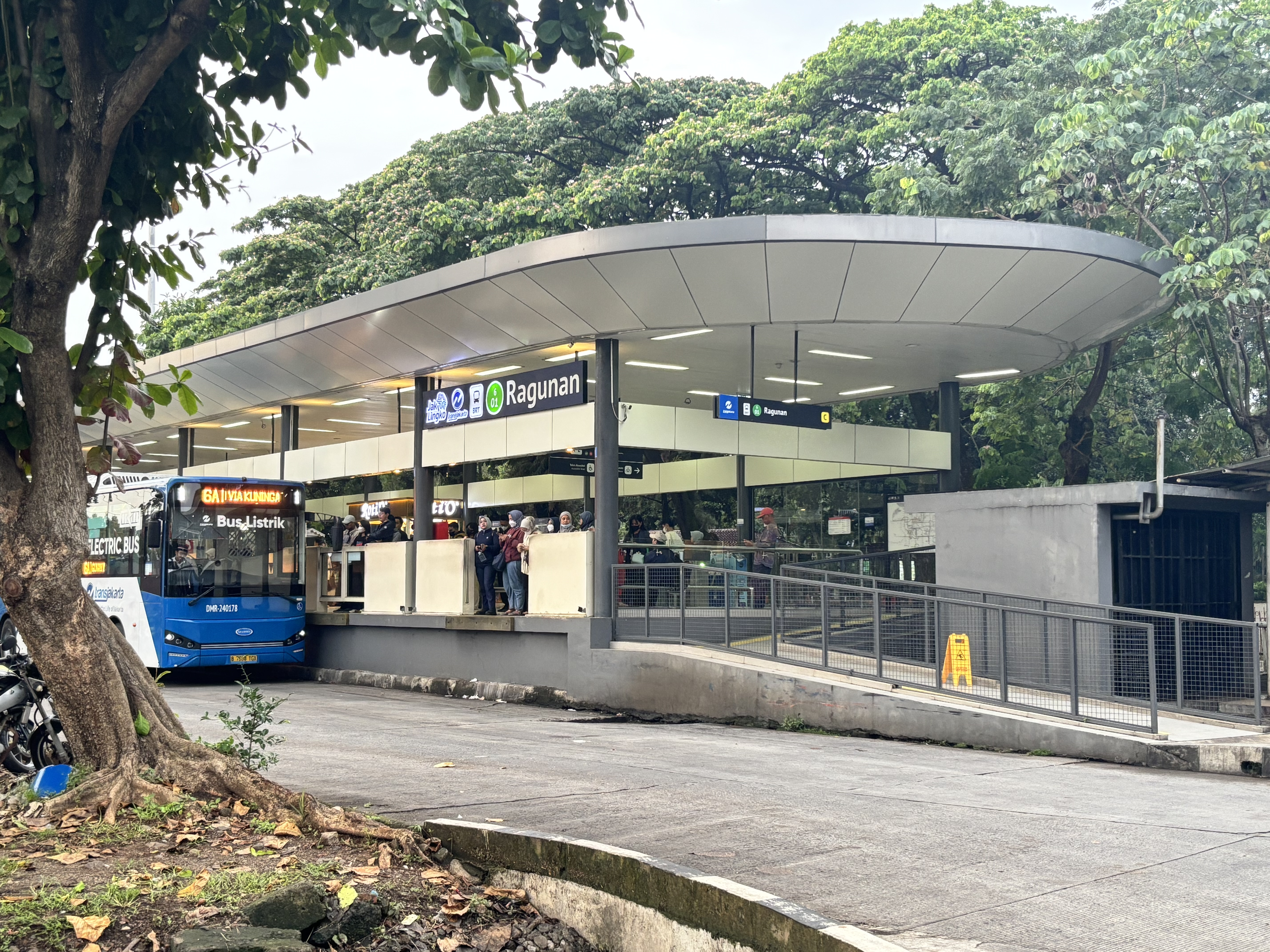
The station viewed from the outside

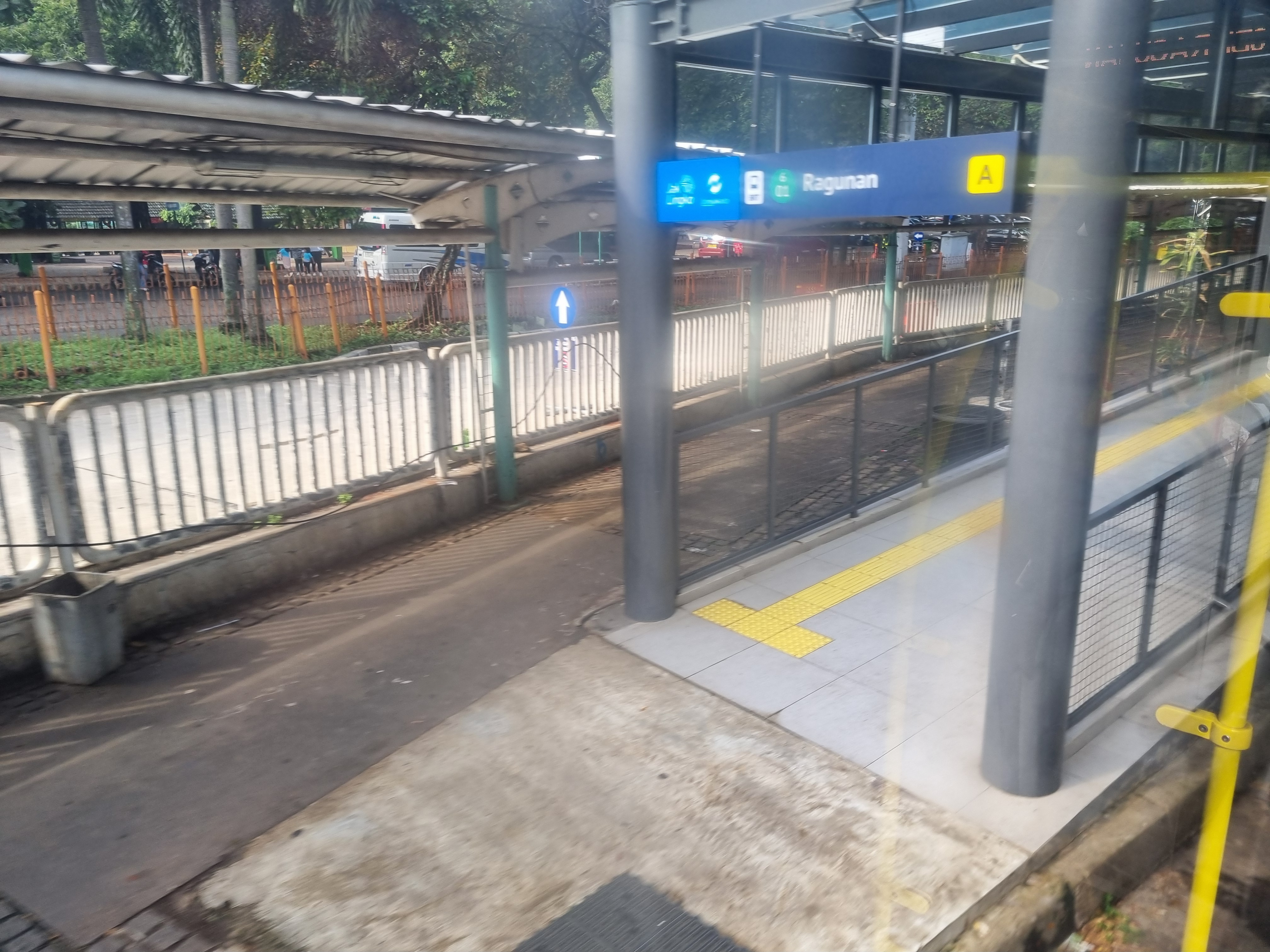
Exit A, 2024

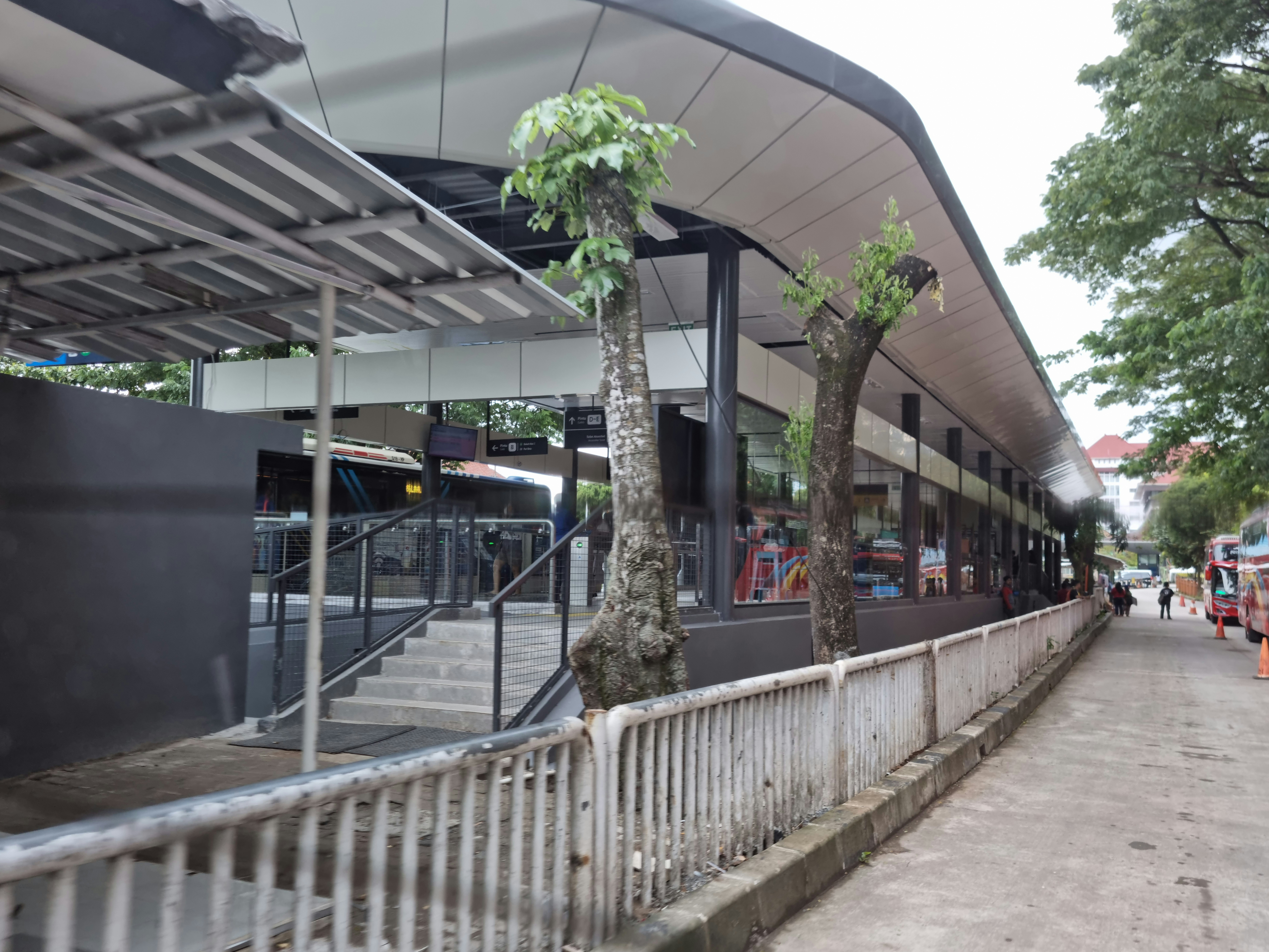
Exit C, 2023.

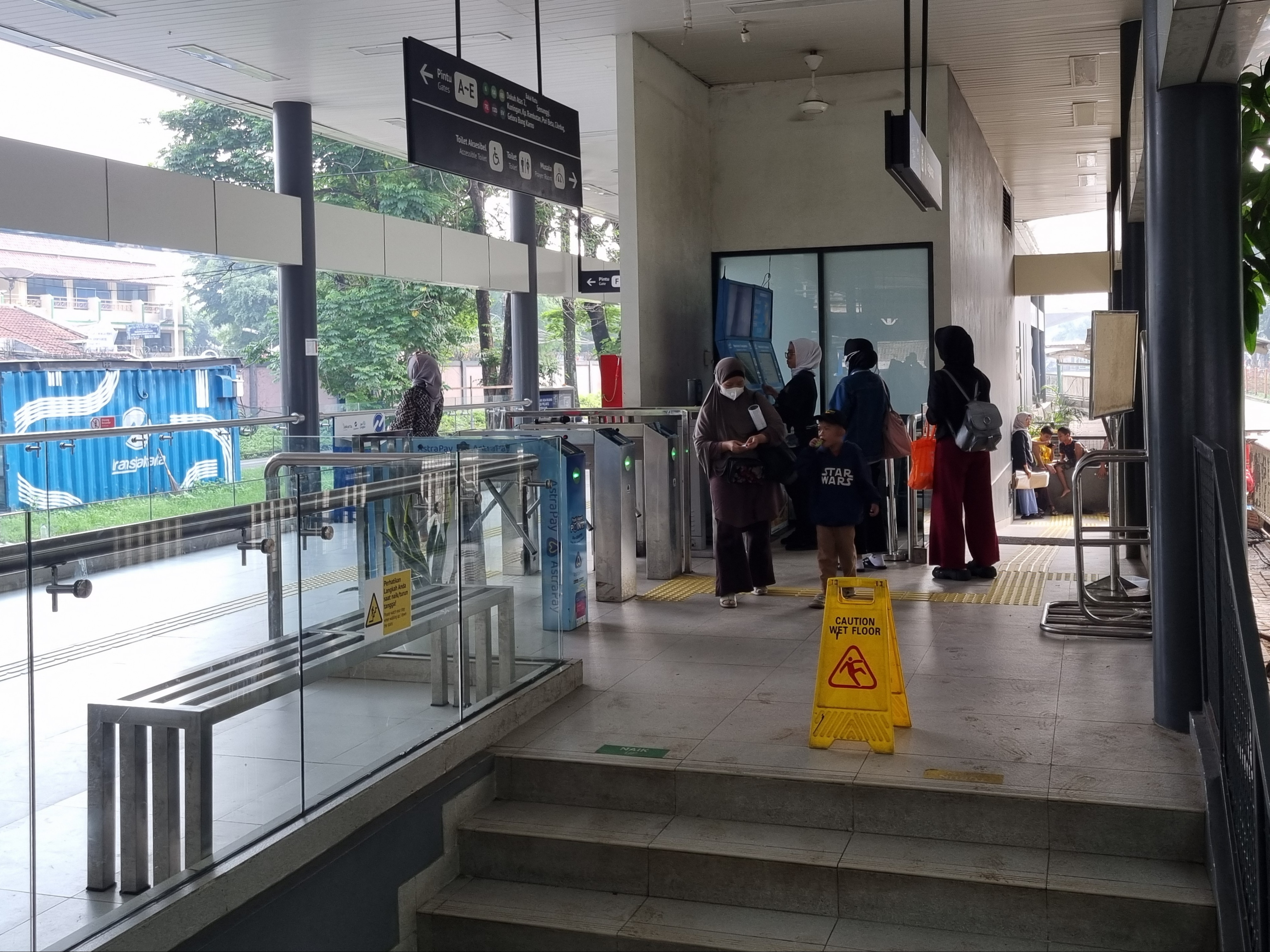
Exit B to Ragunan Zoo, 2024.

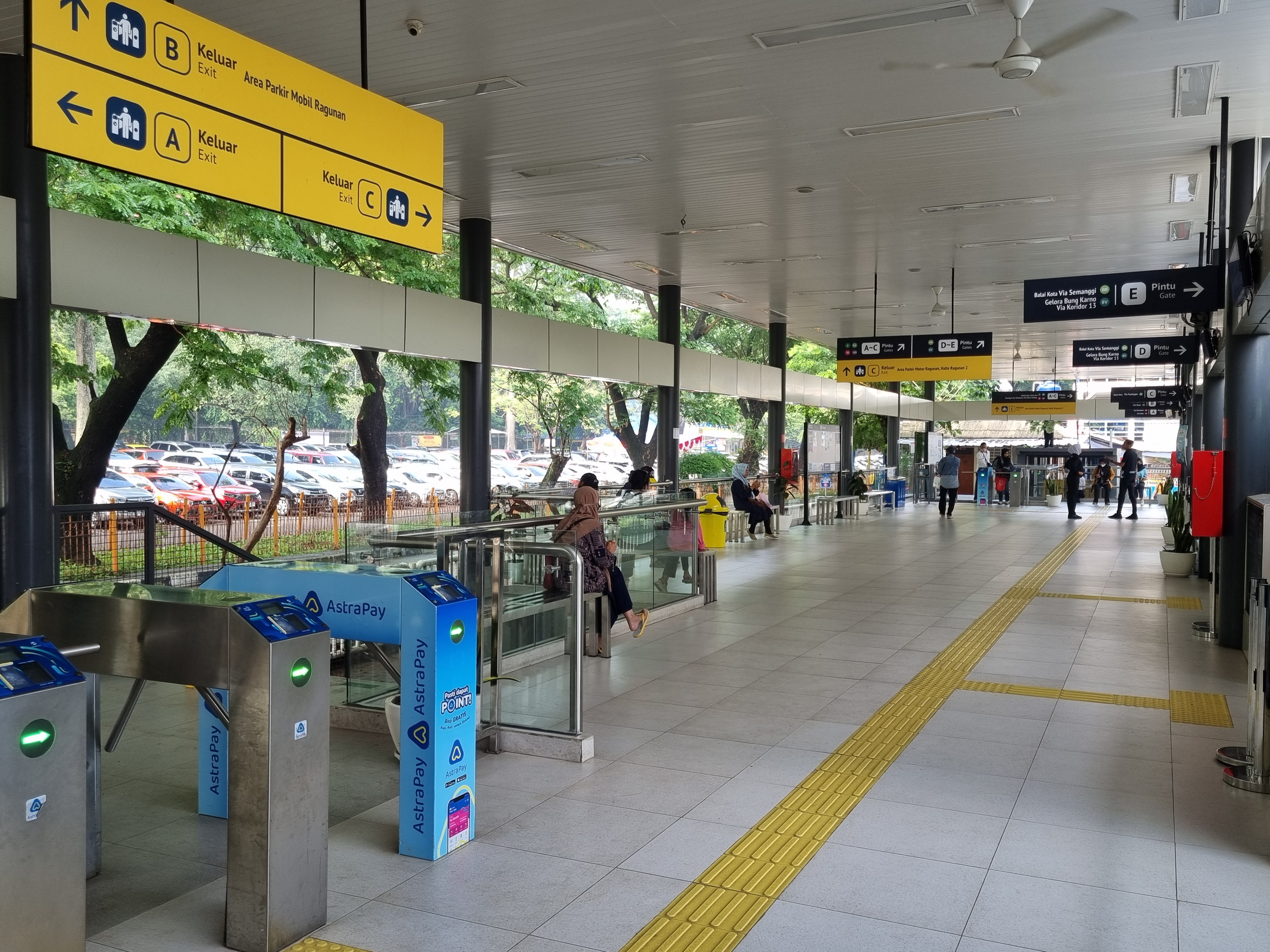
Interior of the station, 2024.

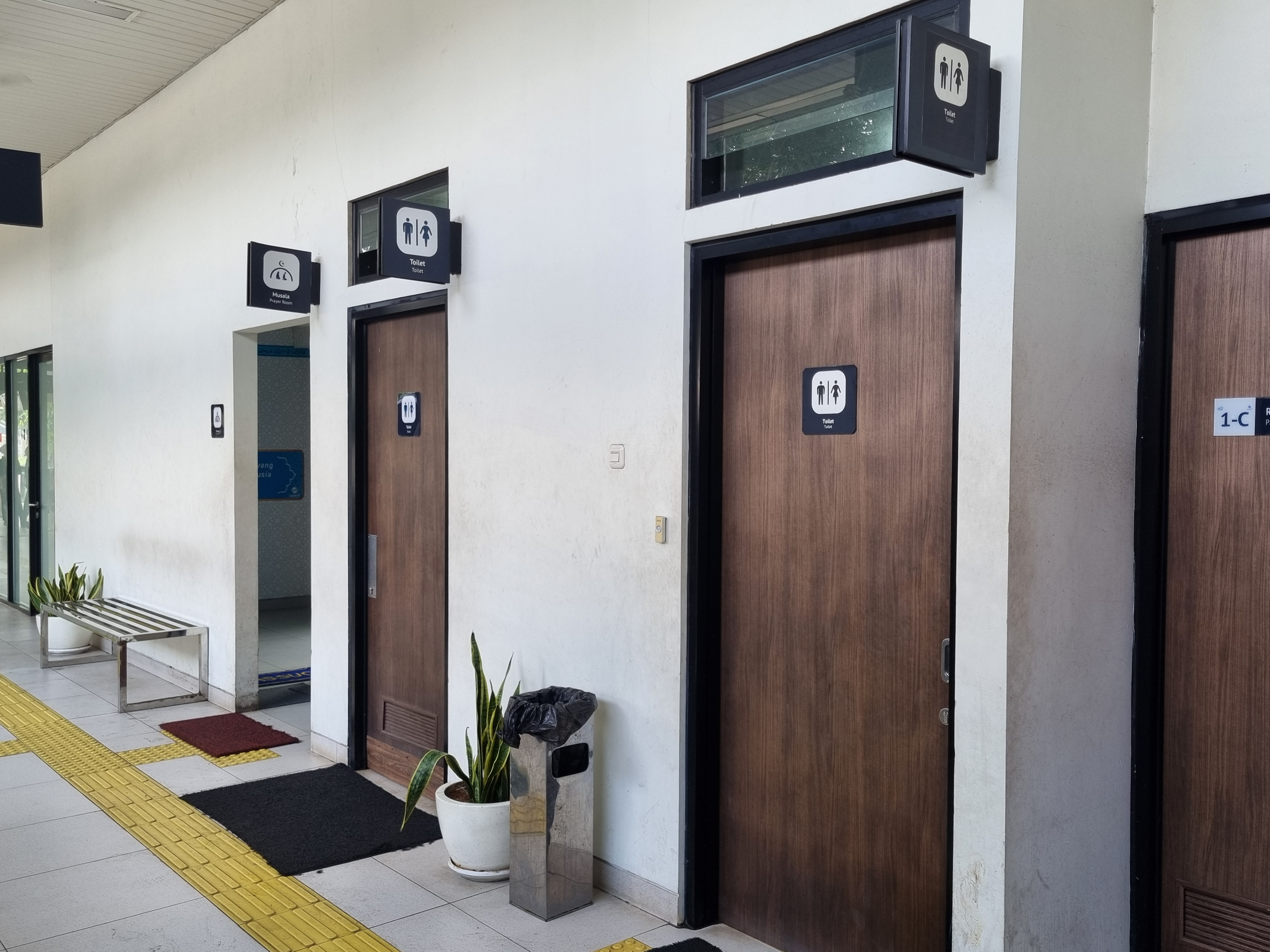
Prayer room and toilets, 2024.
