= Balai Kota (Transjakarta) =

Bus rapid transit station in Jakarta, Indonesia

2 23 Balai Kota
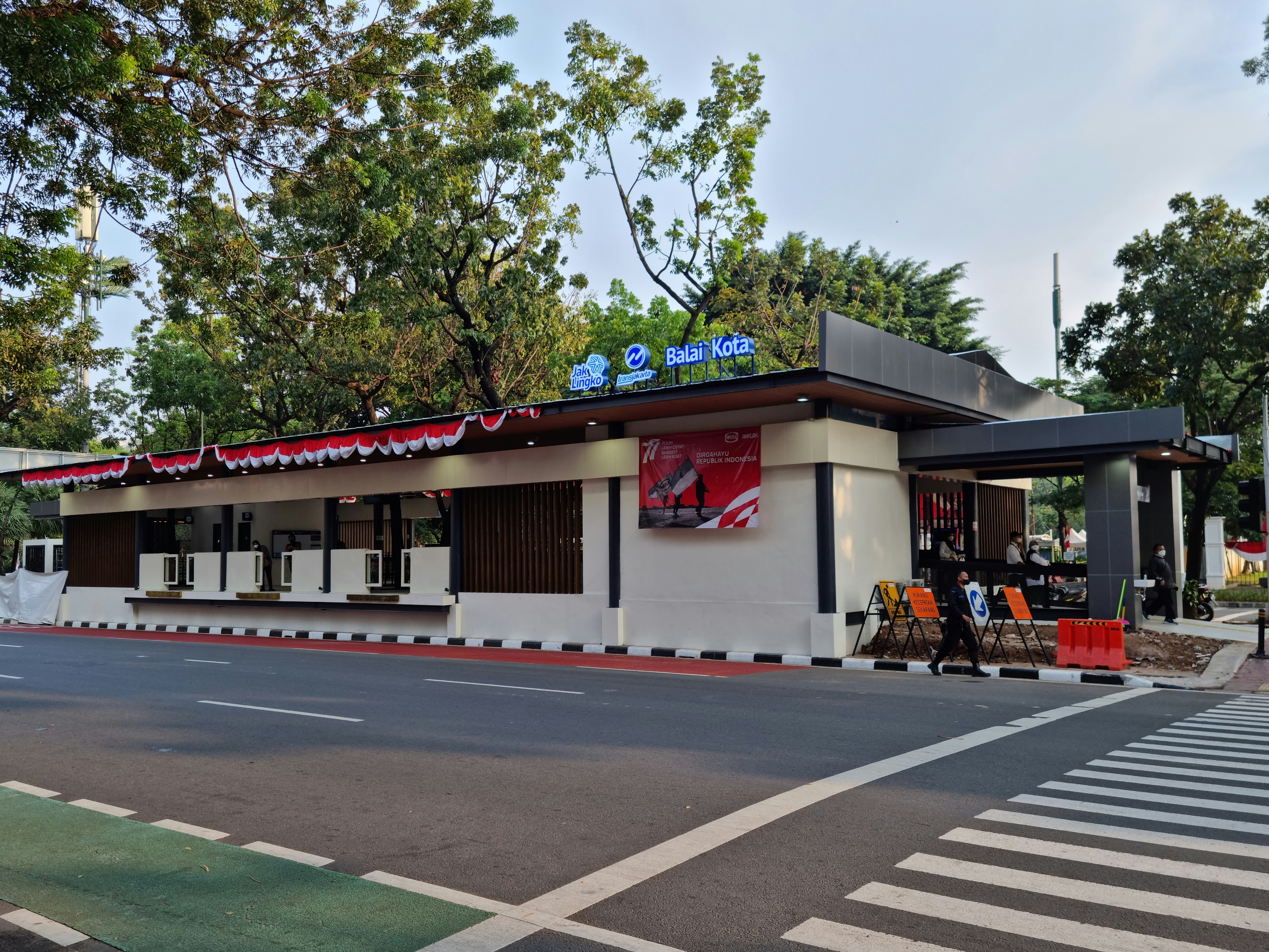
- Exterior view from the road side, 2022

General information
- Location: Medan Merdeka Selatan St. Gambir, Gambir, Central Jakarta 10110, Jakarta, Indonesia
- Coordinates: 6.180488°S 106.826324°E
- System: Transjakarta
- Owner: Transjakarta
- Operator: Transjakarta
- Lines: List of Transjakarta corridors#Corridor 2 List of Transjakarta corridors#Cross-corridor routes List of TransJakarta corridors#Cross-corridor routes
- Platforms: Single island platform

Construction
- Structure type: At-grade
- Cycle facilities: Bicycle parking
- Accessible: Yes
- Architect: Archwork Indonesia
- Architectural style: Minimalism

History
- Opened: 15 January 2006
- Rebuilt: 2022

Services
Preceding		Following
Gambir 2 towards Pulo Gadung	Corridor 2	Monumen Nasional One-way operation
Gambir 2 towards Pulo Gadung	Corridor 2 Route 2A	Petojo One-way operation
Kwitang One-way operation	Corridor 2 Route 2A	Petojo towards Rawa Buaya
Monumen Nasional towards Juanda	Corridor 5 Route 5C	Kwitang One-way operation
Kebon Sirih towards Ragunan	Corridor 6 Route 6A Terminus	Terminus
Kebon Sirih towards Ragunan	Corridor 6 Route 6B Terminus	Terminus
Kwitang One-way operation	Corridor 7 Route 7F	Monumen Nasional towards Juanda
Location

Balai Kota is a Transjakarta bus rapid transit station located at the Medan Merdeka Selatan street in Gambir, Central Jakarta, Jakarta, Indonesia, primarily serving eastbound Corridor 2 buses towards Pulo Gadung. It is named after the Jakarta City Hall (Balai Kota Jakarta) to the east and located adjacent with the National Library of Indonesia to the south, and the National Monument (Monas) and its compound to the north.

== History ==
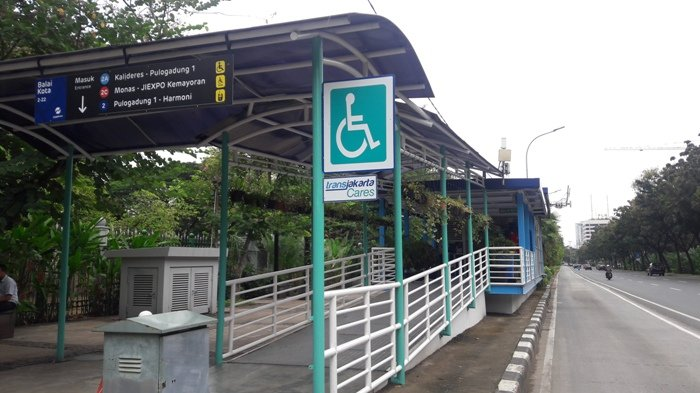
The original station building in 2017

Balai Kota BRT station was opened alongside the entire Corridor 2 on 15 January 2006. It was originally a one-way single side platform station located on a roadside, parallel with the south plaza of the National Monument complex known as the Merdeka Square but located outside the compound. In 2020, the building was demolished to make way for the revitalization of the south plaza, which affected the site.

Plans to rebuild the BRT station only emerged two years later. On 15 April 2022, the reconstruction of the Balai Kota BRT station was conducted, alongside the revitalization of 10 other stations across Jakarta. The new building was constructed on a road median instead, now in a form of an island platform. On 22 August 2022, the new Balai Kota BRT station was reopened to the public.

== Building and layout ==
The current building of Balai Kota BRT station is in the form of an island platform, and built on a road median. Thus, it allows the station to serve both eastbound and westbound buses. It is accessible with a pelican crossing.

The beige-colored building adheres to contemporary eco-friendly minimalist architecture with the touch of wooden elements in the facades and cellings. The unique feature in the interior is the tree trunks within the building, where the trees are retained during the construction process and provided void to grow freely, adding more sereneful atmosphere. This unique feature also exists in Bundaran Senayan, Senayan Bank Jakarta and Kwitang stations. New amenities, such as the accessible toilets and a prayer room (musala) has also been included. There are six platform bays, three for each directions.

North	to Pulo Gadung (Gambir 2) →
Island platform, the doors are opened on the right side of the travel direction
South	← (Monas) to Juanda ← (Petojo) to Rawa Buaya ↓ (M.H. Thamrin) to Ragunan

== Non-BRT bus services ==
To the north of Balai Kota BRT station, there is a non-BRT bus stop named IRTI, serving regular non-BRT feeder routes and double-decker tour bus routes.

Service type	Route	Destination	Notes
Jakarta Fair feeder		Balai Kota–JIEXPO Kemayoran	Only operates during the Jakarta Fair and/or other events at the Jakarta International Expo. Inside the station
Inner city feeder		Balai Kota–Pantai Indah Kapuk	Inside the station
Inner city feeder		Senen–Blok M	Outside the station
Inner city feeder		Senen–Tanah Abang	Outside the station
Inner city feeder		Balai Kota–Gondangdia	Outside the station
Inner city feeder		Kampung Melayu–Tanah Abang via Cikini	Outside the station
Royaltrans (premium)		Balai Kota–Cibubur	Outside the station
#jakartaexplorer double-decker tour bus		Monas Explorer	Outside the station
#jakartaexplorer double-decker tour bus		Jakarta Skyscrapers	Outside the station

== Nearby places ==
- National Monument
- Danareksa Tower
- Gambir Telecommunications Station
- National Library of Indonesia
- National Resilience Institute
- Jakarta City Hall

== Incident ==
On 30 July 2022, the ceiling structure of the newly rebuilt Balai Kota station collapsed during the rebuilding process, but thankfully there were no casualties. According to the construction contractor, the ceiling collapse was due to a human error.

== Gallery ==
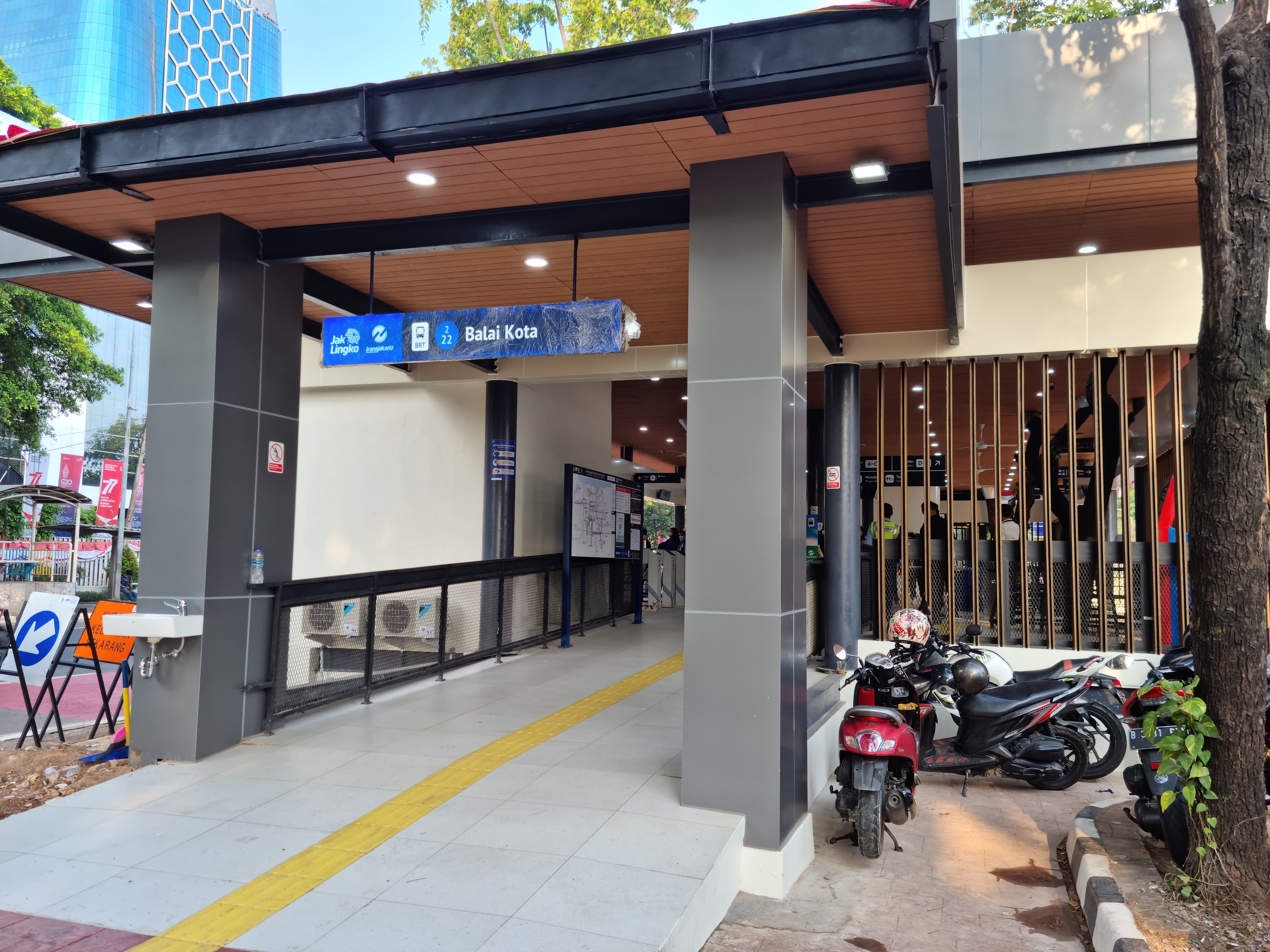
The entrance

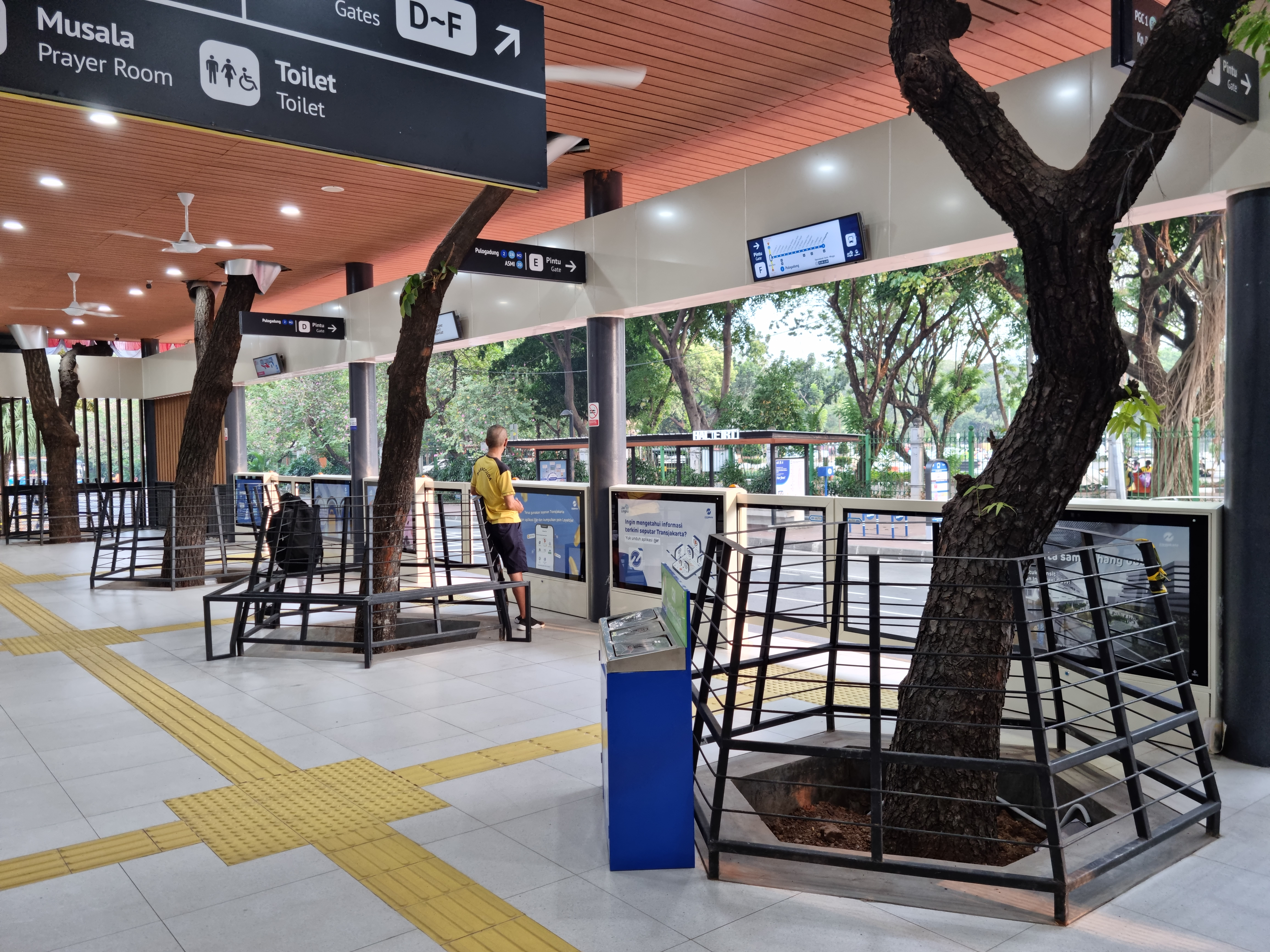
Inner view of the platform area

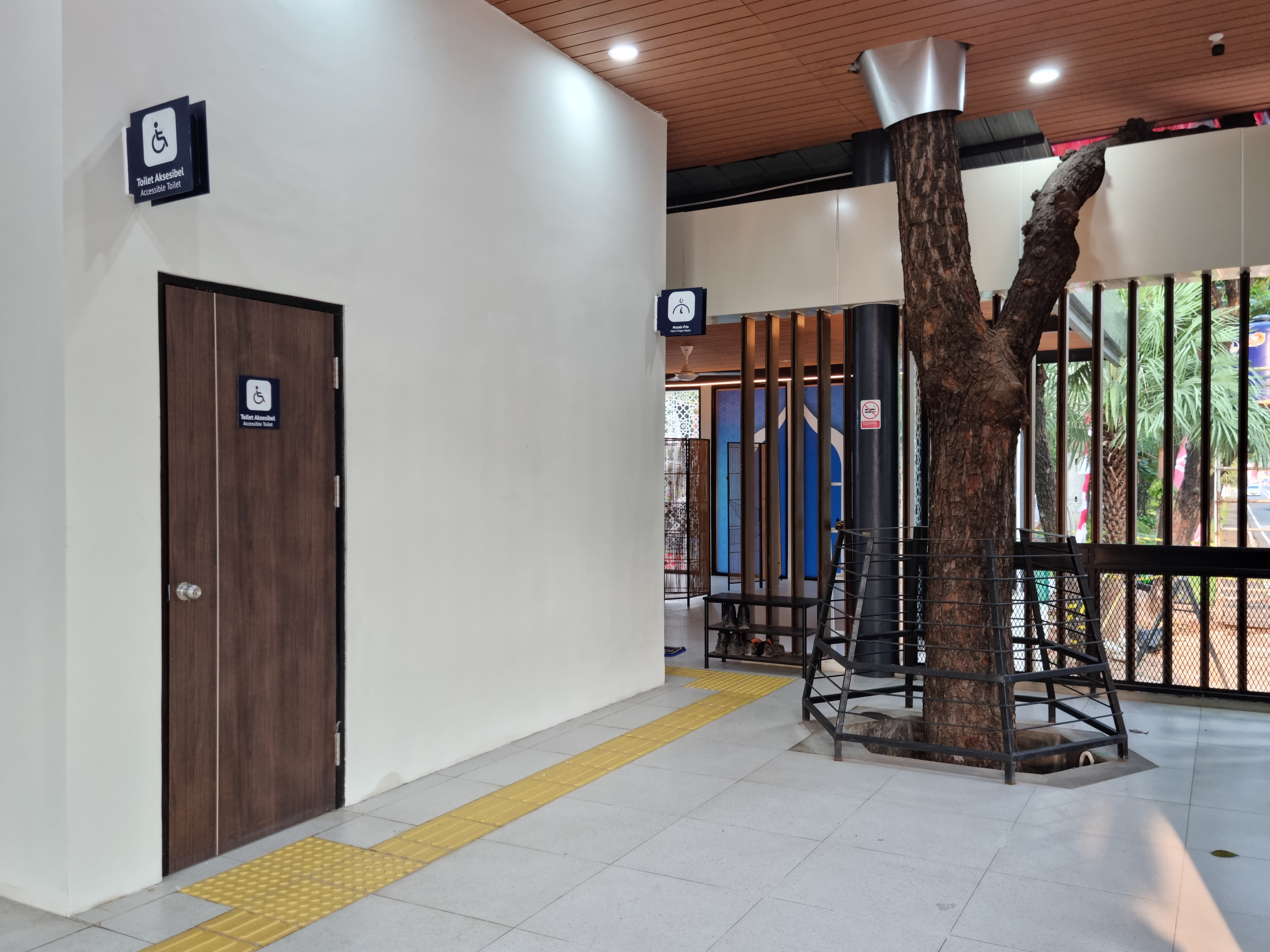
An accessible toilet to the left and a prayer room (musala) in the background

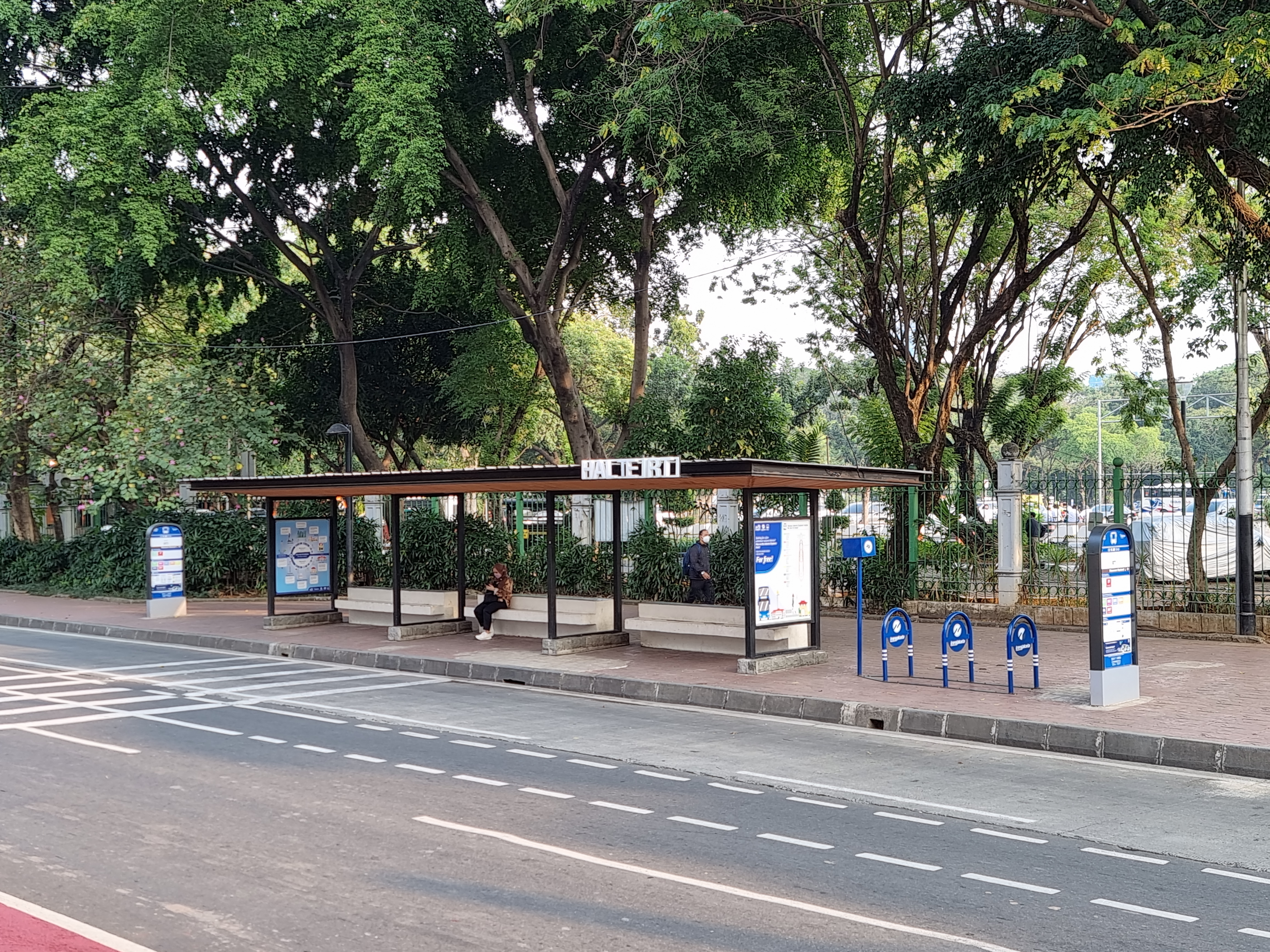
The IRTI non-BRT bus stop to the north
