= Ragunan =

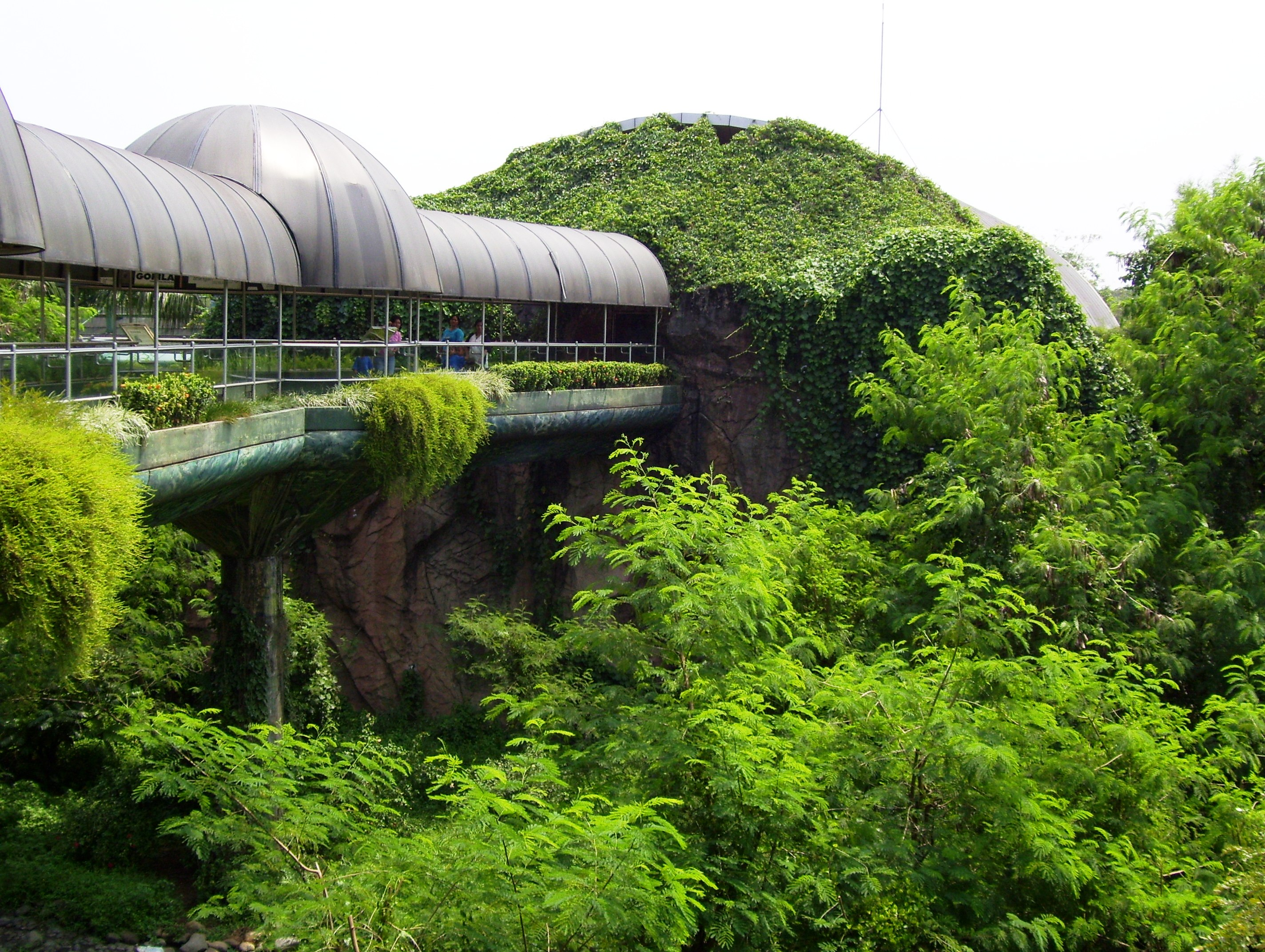
Ragunan Zoological Garden is located in Ragunan Kelurahan.

Ragunan is a kelurahan (Administrative Village) of Pasar Minggu District, South Jakarta. The boundaries of Ragunan Kelurahan are Pejaten Barat Street to the north, Cilandak KKO Street to the west, Kebagusan Raya Street to the east, and Sagu Street to the south. Ragunan Kelurahan was bounded by Pejaten Barat Kelurahan to the north, Cilandak Timur Kelurhaan to the west, and Jagakarsa Kelurahan to south and to the east.

The zip code of this administrative village is 12550.

Ragunan Subdistrict is the location of the Ragunan Zoological Garden.

== Toponym ==
The name Ragunan comes from the name of the landlord of the area Pangeran ("Prince") Wiraguna, a name adopted by the controversial figure Hendrik Lucaasz Cardeel, a Dutchman who lived in the 17th century. He was appointed as landlord of the area by the Sultanate of Banten, Abunasar Abdul Qahar, which was buried in the area.
