= Bendungan Hilir (Transjakarta) =

Bus rapid transit station in Jakarta, Indonesia

1 07 Bendungan Hilir
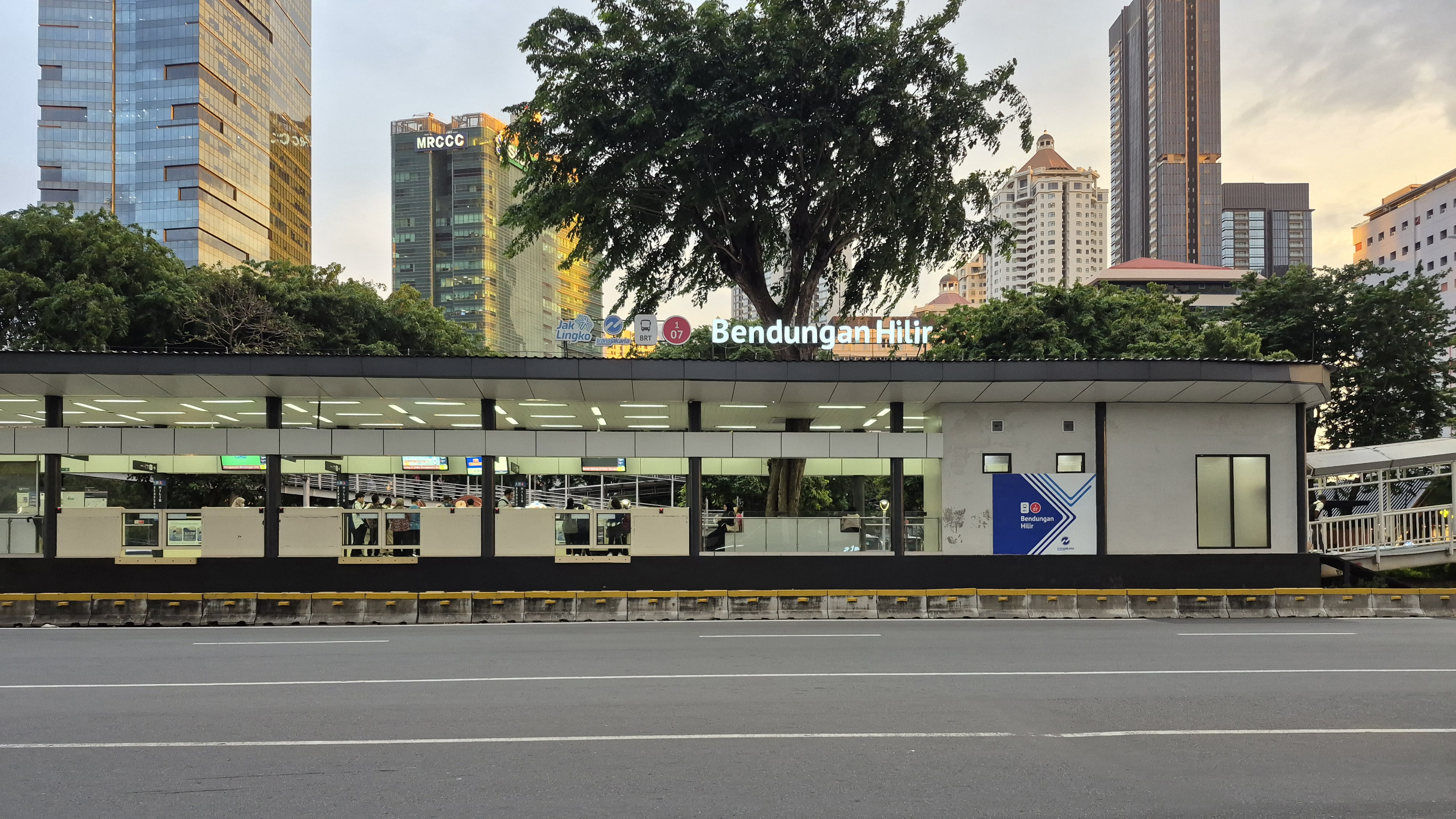

General information
- Location: Jenderal Sudirman Street; Gelora, Tanah Abang, Central Jakarta (northern side); Senayan, Kebayoran Baru, South Jakarta (southern side); Indonesia
- Coordinates: 6.21706°S 106.81531°E
- System: Transjakarta bus rapid transit station
- Owner: Transjakarta
- Operator: Transjakarta
- Lines: List of Transjakarta corridors#Corridor 1
- Platforms: Single island platform
- Connections: Semanggi

Construction
- Structure type: At-grade

Other information
- Status: In service

History
- Opened: 15 January 2004 (soft launching); 1 February 2004 (commercial operation)
- Rebuilt: 14 July 2024

Services
Preceding		Following
Polda Metro Jaya towards Blok M	Corridor 1	Karet towards Kali Besar
Widya Chandra Telkomsel One-way operation	Corridor 6 Route 6B transfer at Semanggi	Karet towards Balai Kota
Widya Chandra Telkomsel towards Pinang Ranti	Corridor 9 transfer at Semanggi	Gerbang Pemuda towards Pluit
Widya Chandra Telkomsel towards Cililitan	Corridor 9 Route 9A transfer at Semanggi	Gerbang Pemuda towards Grogol Reformasi
Widya Chandra Telkomsel towards Pinang Ranti	Corridor 9 Route 9C transfer at Semanggi	Senayan Bank Jakarta One-way operation
Location

Bendungan Hilir (often abbreviated as Benhil) is a Transjakarta bus rapid transit station located on Sudirman Street in Karet Semanggi, Setiabudi, South Jakarta, Indonesia, that serves Corridor 1, which runs north to south. This station is connected to the Semanggi BRT station that serves Corridor 9. It is named after the district it is located in.

On 7 October 2023 at 22:00, the Bendungan Hilir station, along with the Semanggi station, were temporarily closed due to the revitalisation works. On 14 July 2024, at 16:00, the Bendungan Hilir station reopened to passengers. The reopening was carried out in stages, with the lift and Semanggi pedestrian bridge still under construction when the station reopened.

== Building and layout ==
Bendungan Hilir BRT station now has two floors: the upper for entrance and concource, and the lower for the platform area with six bus bays on each side of the platform. It is accessible through a pedestrian skybridge connected to both sides of the Jenderal Sudirman Street equipped with an elevator, or through Komdak Semanggi Skybridge that crosses the Jakarta Inner Ring Road and Gatot Subroto Street, being the longest of its kind in Jakarta at 574 metres long.

North	to Kota (Karet) →
Island platform, the platform doors are opened on the right side of the direction of travel
South	← (Polda Metro Jaya) to Blok M

== Non-BRT bus services ==
The following non-BRT bus services stop around the Kebon Sirih station, last updated on 23 March 2025:

Type	Route	Destination	Notes
Inner city feeder		Palmerah Station—Dukuh Atas	Outside the station
Inner city feeder		Senen—Blok M	Outside the station
Inner city feeder		Bundaran Senayan—JIEP Pulo Gadung	Outside the station
Inner city feeder		Tebet Station—Bundaran Senayan	Outside the station
Inner city feeder		Pasar Minggu—Tanah Abang Station	Outside the station
Royaltrans (premium)		Cibubur Junction—Balai Kota	Outside the station

== Places nearby ==
- Lippo Mall Nusantara
  - Balai Sarbini
  - Gedung Veteran RI
- Atma Jaya Catholic University of Indonesia
- Wisma GKBI
  - Embassy of South Africa
- Bank Rakyat Indonesia headquarters
- Jakarta Mori Tower

== Gallery ==
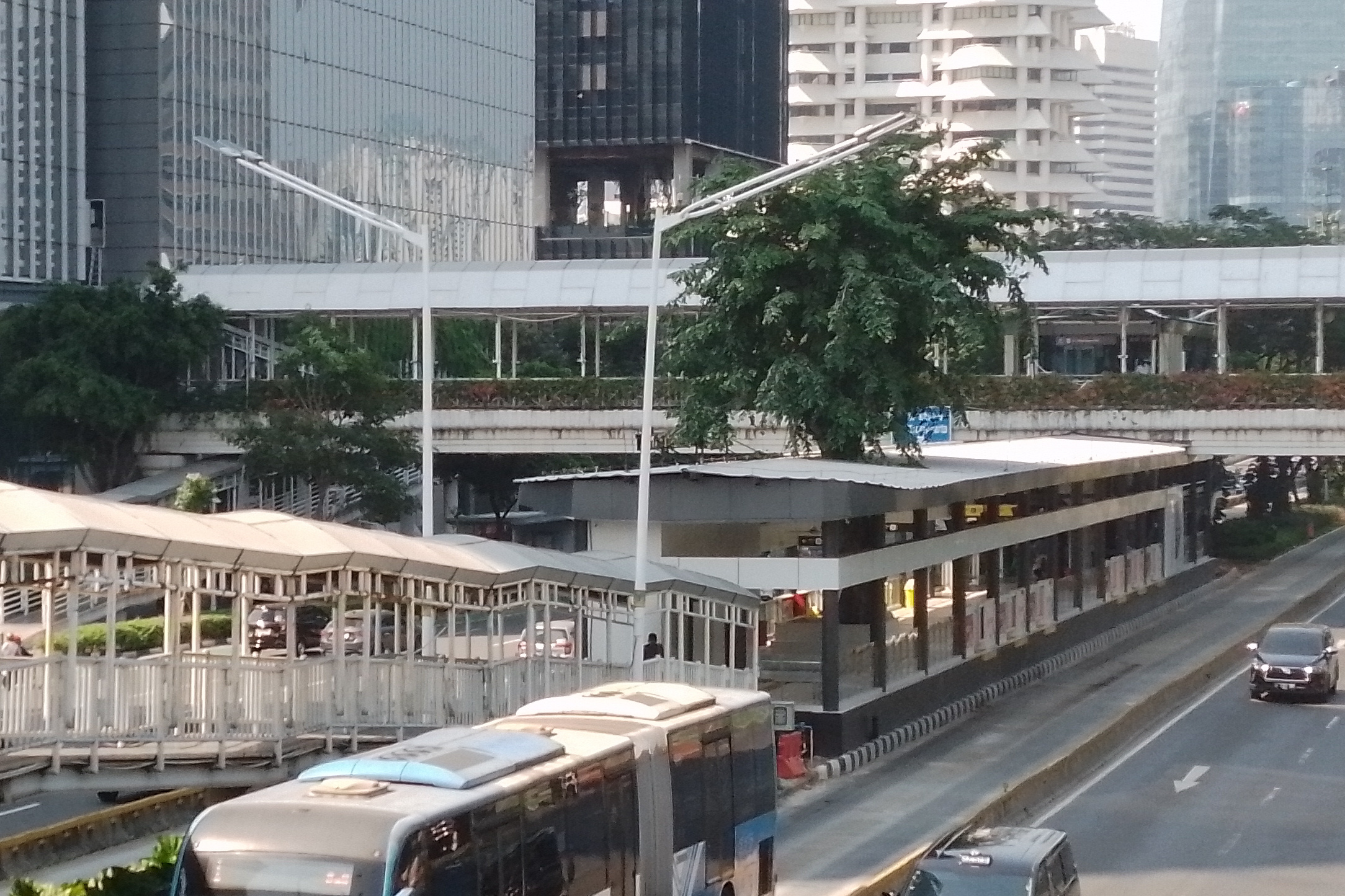
The station seen from the connection bridge to Semanggi BRT station on corridor 9, 2024

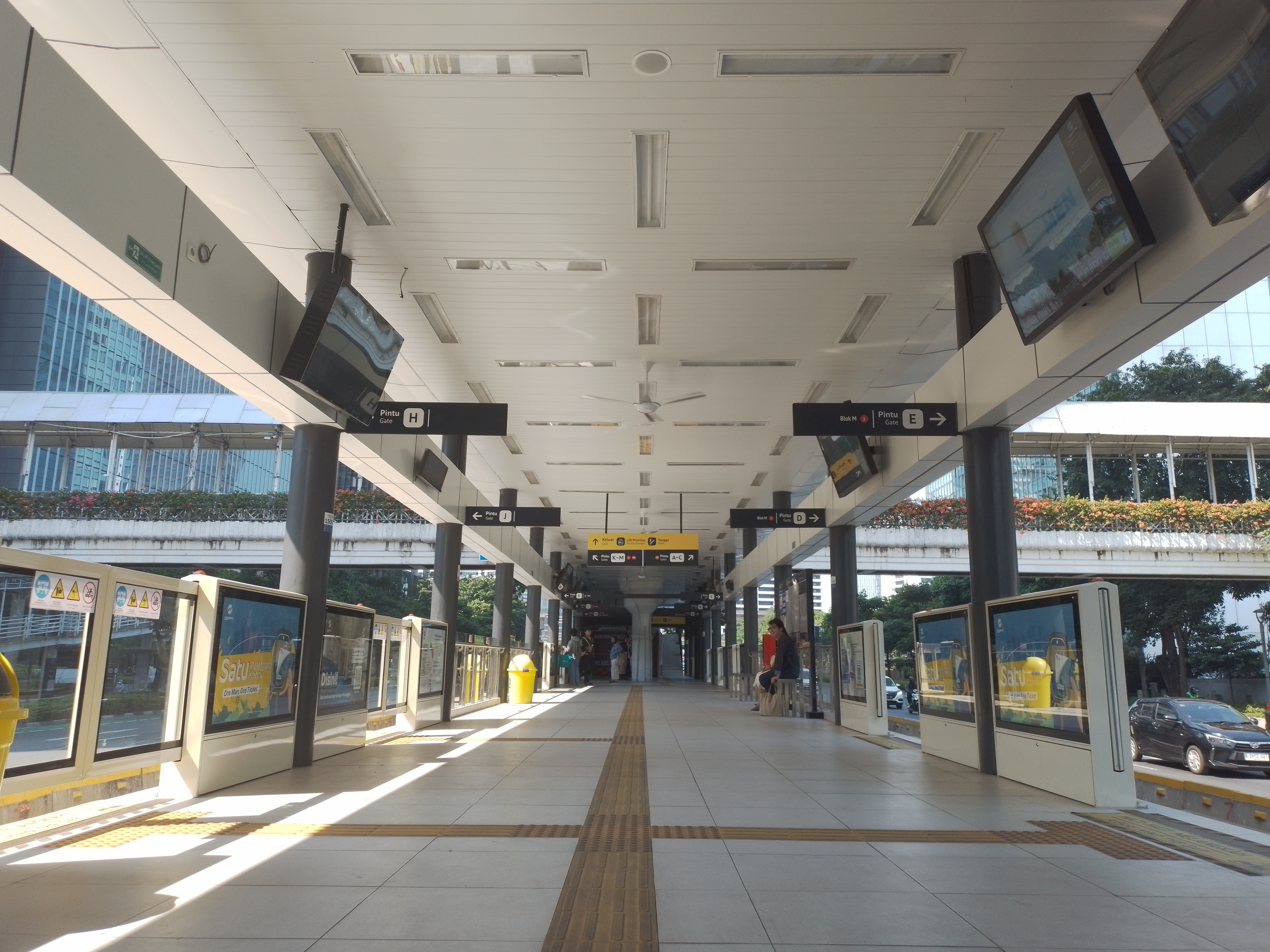
The platform area, 2024

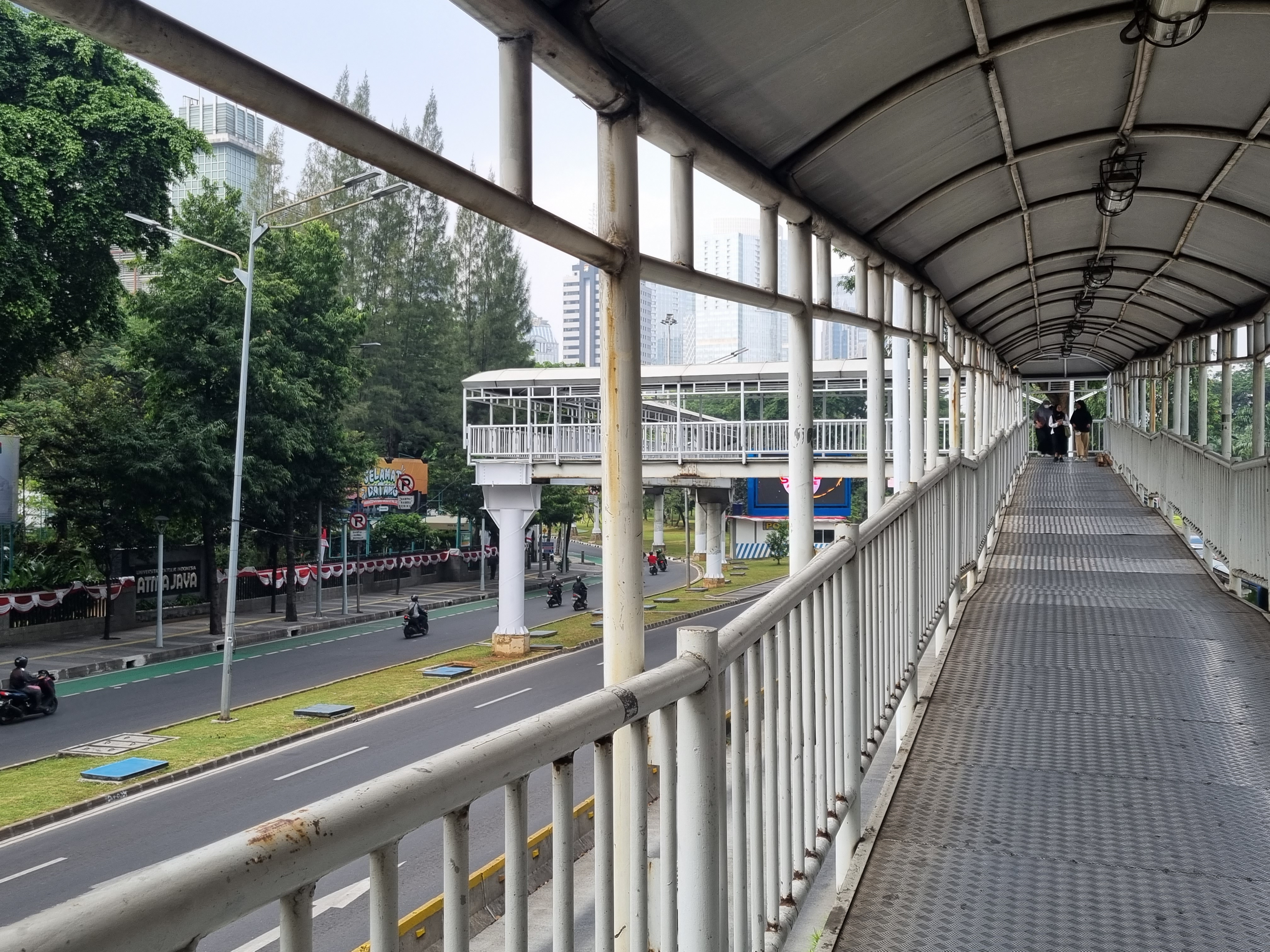
The connection bridge to Semanggi BRT station, 2023
