= Karet (Transjakarta) =

Bus rapid transit station in Jakarta, Indonesia

1 08 Karet
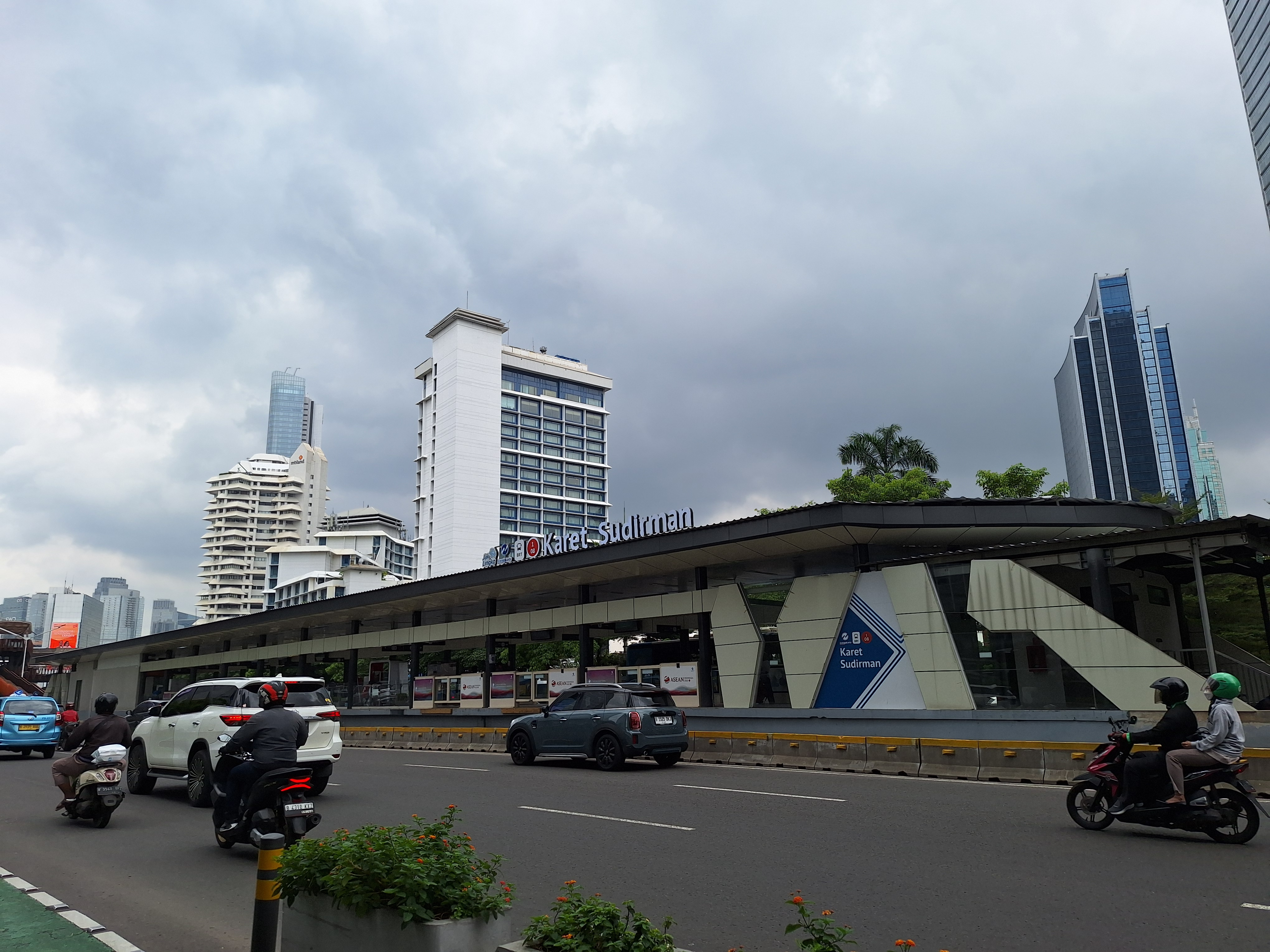

General information
- Location: Jenderal Sudirman Street; Karet Tengsin, Tanah Abang, Central Jakarta (northern side); Karet, Setiabudi, South Jakarta (southern side); Indonesia
- Coordinates: 6.214731°S 106.818265°E
- System: Transjakarta bus rapid transit station
- Owner: Transjakarta
- Operator: Transjakarta
- Lines: List of Transjakarta corridors#Corridor 1 List of TransJakarta corridors#Cross-corridor routes
- Platforms: Single island platform
- Connections: Bendungan Hilir

Construction
- Structure type: At-grade

Other information
- Status: In service

History
- Opened: 15 January 2004 (soft launching); 1 February 2004 (commercial operation)
- Rebuilt: 1 September 2023
- Former names: Karet Sudirman

Services
Preceding		Following
Bendungan Hilir towards Blok M	Corridor 1	Dukuh Atas towards Kali Besar
Semanggi One-way operation	Corridor 6 Route 6B	Dukuh Atas towards Balai Kota
Widya Chandra Telkomsel towards Ragunan	Corridor 6 Route 6B	Dukuh Atas One-way operation
Location

Karet is a Transjakarta bus rapid transit station located on Jenderal Sudirman Street in Jakarta, Indonesia, located in the borderline between Karet, Setiabudi, South Jakarta and Karet Tengsin, Tanah Abang, Central Jakarta. The station serves Corridor 1 that runs from the north to the south.

Originally, there used to be the Setiabudi BRT station (not to be confused with the existing station of the same name that serves Corridor 6) that was located after this station for northbound buses. However, it was demolished during the MRT construction, and was never rebuilt.

== History ==
When it first opened serving Corridor 1 on 15 January 2004, the Karet BRT station had a medium-sized building with 3 bus bays on each side of the platform. Instead of its current location, Karet station was previously located right under the K.H. Mas Mansyur overpass. On 4 June 2014, it was moved 265 metres to the north, right next to the Le Meridien Hotel, in order to facilitate the construction of the Bendungan Hilir MRT station. The new building had six platform bays on each side, and a dedicated space for Islamic prayers or salat (musala) on the north end of the building that was added in early December 2017.

On 31 May 2023, Karet station, along with Bundaran Senayan and Slipi Petamburan (now known as Petamburan), were closed for revitalisation works. However, the closure of these stations was postponed on the day of the closure until 22:00. The reconstruction process was sped up until its completion and reopening on 31 August 2023, just two months after closure. Accelerations were done due to preparations for an ASEAN Summit on 4–7 September 2023, where the Jenderal Sudirman street would be passed by foreign delegates of the summit, thus all road works (including Karet BRT station revitalisation) must be either finished or halted for the summit.

== Building and layout ==
Karet BRT station now has a spacious, open-air design and slightly longer than the previous one. With six bus bays on each side of the platform, the prayer room (musala) was improved alongside the inclusion of newly-added toilets to meet growing passenger demand and enhance comfort. Its connection bridge has an iconically-designed observation deck that resembles the Phinisi traditional sail ships known as the "Karet Sudirman Phinisi Pedestrian Bridge" after being revitalised earlier in 2022. The bridge features a bicycle lane for cycleres crossing to both sides of the Sudirman street, the first of its kind in Indonesia, and has high-capacity elevators with an ability to carry eight bicycles.

West			towards Kota and towards Balai Kota (Dukuh Atas) →
Island platform, the platform doors are opened on the right side of the direction of travel
East	← (Bendungan Hilir)	towards Blok M	towards Ragunan
East	↓ (Widya Chandra Telkomsel)	towards Blok M	towards Ragunan

== Non-BRT bus services ==
The following non-BRT bus services stop around the Karet station, last updated on 1 July 2026:

Type	Route	Destination	Notes
Inner city feeder		Palmerah Station—Dukuh Atas	Inside the station
Inner city feeder		Senen—Blok M	Outside the station
Inner city feeder		Bundaran Senayan—JIEP Pulo Gadung	Outside the station
Inner city feeder		Tebet Station—Bundaran Senayan	Outside the station
Inner city feeder		Pasar Minggu—Tanah Abang Station	Outside the station
Royaltrans (premium)		Cibubur Junction—Balai Kota	Outside the station
#jakartaexplorer double-decker tour buses		Jakarta Skyscrapers (Pencakar Langit Jakarta)	Outside the station

== Places nearby ==
- World Trade Center Jakarta
  - Embassies of:
    - Canada
    - Ecuador
    - Guatemala
    - Republic of Ireland
    - Panama
  - Hong Kong Economic and Trade Office
- Intiland Tower
- Le Meridien Jakarta Hotel
- Sahid Sudirman Jakarta Hotel
- Plaza Mayapada
- Millennium Centennial Tower

== Incident ==
Karet BRT station was damaged during the Omnibus law protests on 8 October 2020.
