= Lippo Mall Nusantara =

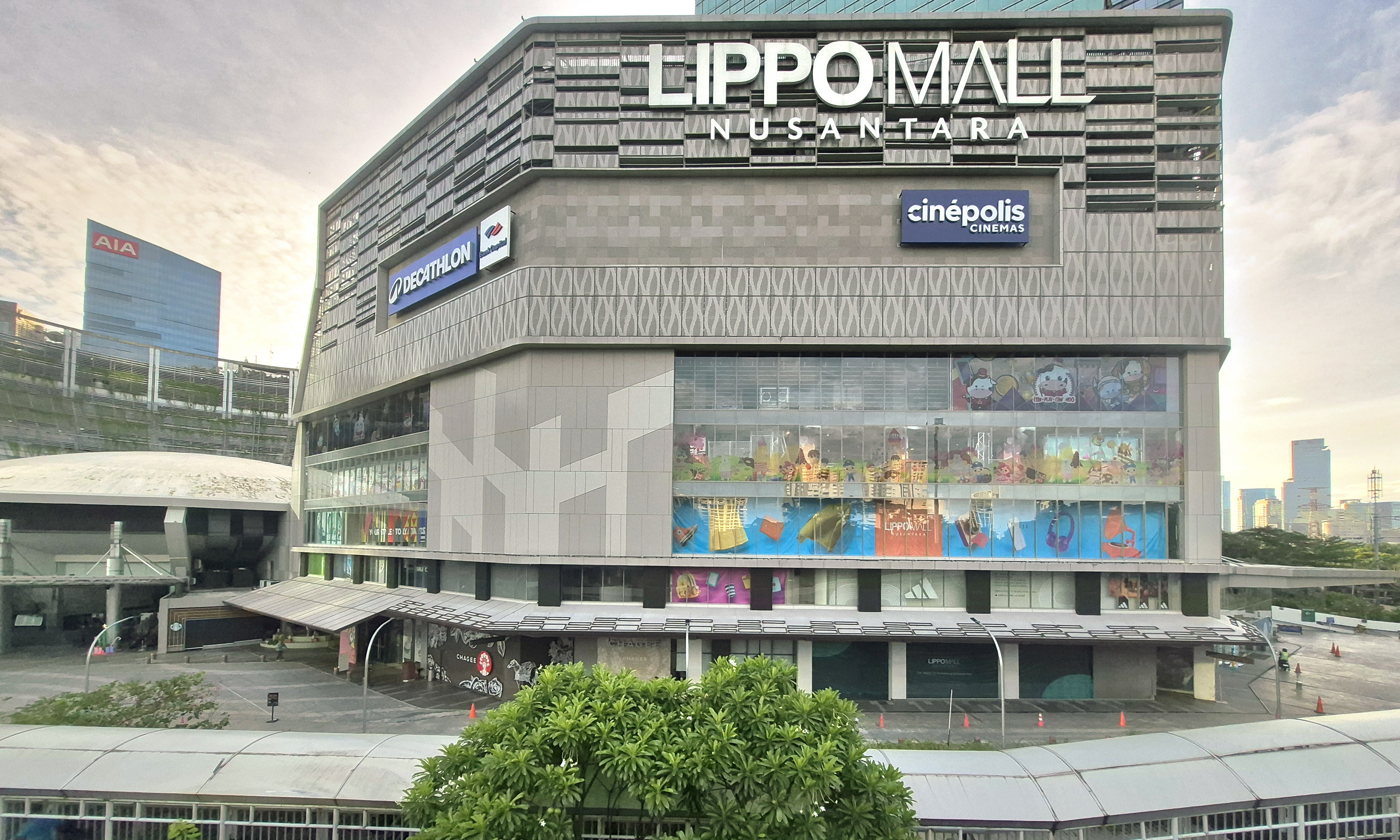
- Exterior, 2025
- Location: Setiabudi, South Jakarta, Jakarta, Indonesia
- Coordinates: 6.219754°S 106.814478°E
- Address: Kawasan Bisnis Granadha, Jalan Jendral Sudirman Kav. 50, Jakarta 12930
- Opened: March 13, 2004
- Developer: PT. Lippo Karawaci Tbk
- Manager: PT. Lippo Karawaci Tbk
- Owner: PT. Lippo Karawaci Tbk
- Architect: Airmas Asri
- Floors: 8
- Public transit: Bendungan Hilir or Istora Mandiri; Bendungan Hilir; Semanggi
- Website: Lippo Mall Nusantara

Lippo Mall Nusantara (LMN) (formerly known as the Plaza Semanggi (Plangi)) is a commercial complex located adjacent with the Semanggi Interchange in South Jakarta, Indonesia. It includes the 8-floor shopping mall, an auditorium named Balai Sarbini and 17-floor office tower Gedung Veteran RI (GVRI); the mall was opened in 2004, along with the refurbishment of the latter two buildings, which were constructed in 1973.

== History ==
The dome-roofed Balai Sarbini auditorium and the adjoining Gedung Veteran RI (also called the Graha Purna Yudha tower) were the buildings that were located on the northeast corner of Semanggi cloverleaf bridge. Both buildings were built by President Sukarno in 1965 for the Indonesian Veterans Legion (LVRI) to look after the interests of veterans who had fought against foreign aggression to maintain Indonesia's independence. Funding shortages meant they were not completed until 1973 and then opened by President Suharto.

In the early 2000s, the Plaza Semanggi was built around Balai Sarbini and Gedung Veteran under a built-operate-transfer (BOT) contract with LVRI. It was officially opened by Sukarno's daughter, President Megawati Sukarnoputri, on 13 March 2004. Plaza Semanggi shortly became one of the most popular malls in Jakarta, as it is strategically located next to the busy Semanggi Interchange and hosted many international brands like the Centro department store (closed in 2019) and La Porchetta, as well as Giant hypermarket (replaced by Foodmart) and Gramedia.

The COVID-19 pandemic resulted significant decline of Plangi's visitors, where many shops permanently closed and was considered to be "dead." In response, the management started a major renovation and re-conception of Plangi, starting from 1 November 2023. The ongoing renovation is divided into two stages, the second one is still on process until August 2025. On 18 December 2024, along with the completion of the first stage of renovation, Plaza Semanggi was renamed to Lippo Mall Nusantara.

== Tenants and facilities ==
The current anchor tenants of Lippo Mall Nusantara are Cinépolis movie theatre at the 5th floor, Oh! Some, and Foodmart supermarket (replacing Giant) on B1 floor. New tenants will be gradually opened after renovation, including Uniqlo.

On the rooftop, there is an open-air restaurant named Déjà Vu Sky Dining. There are numbers of new amenities in LMN, such as the refurbished main atrium and a public amphitheatre at Ground floor. The LG floor is designated as a "super thematic" food court named Alun-Alun Nusantara (inspired by Bangkok's Iconsiam), with a mini museum called "Museum Perjuangan Indonesia" (Indonesian Struggle Museum) dedicated to Indonesia's national heroes, including Sukarno.

== Gallery ==
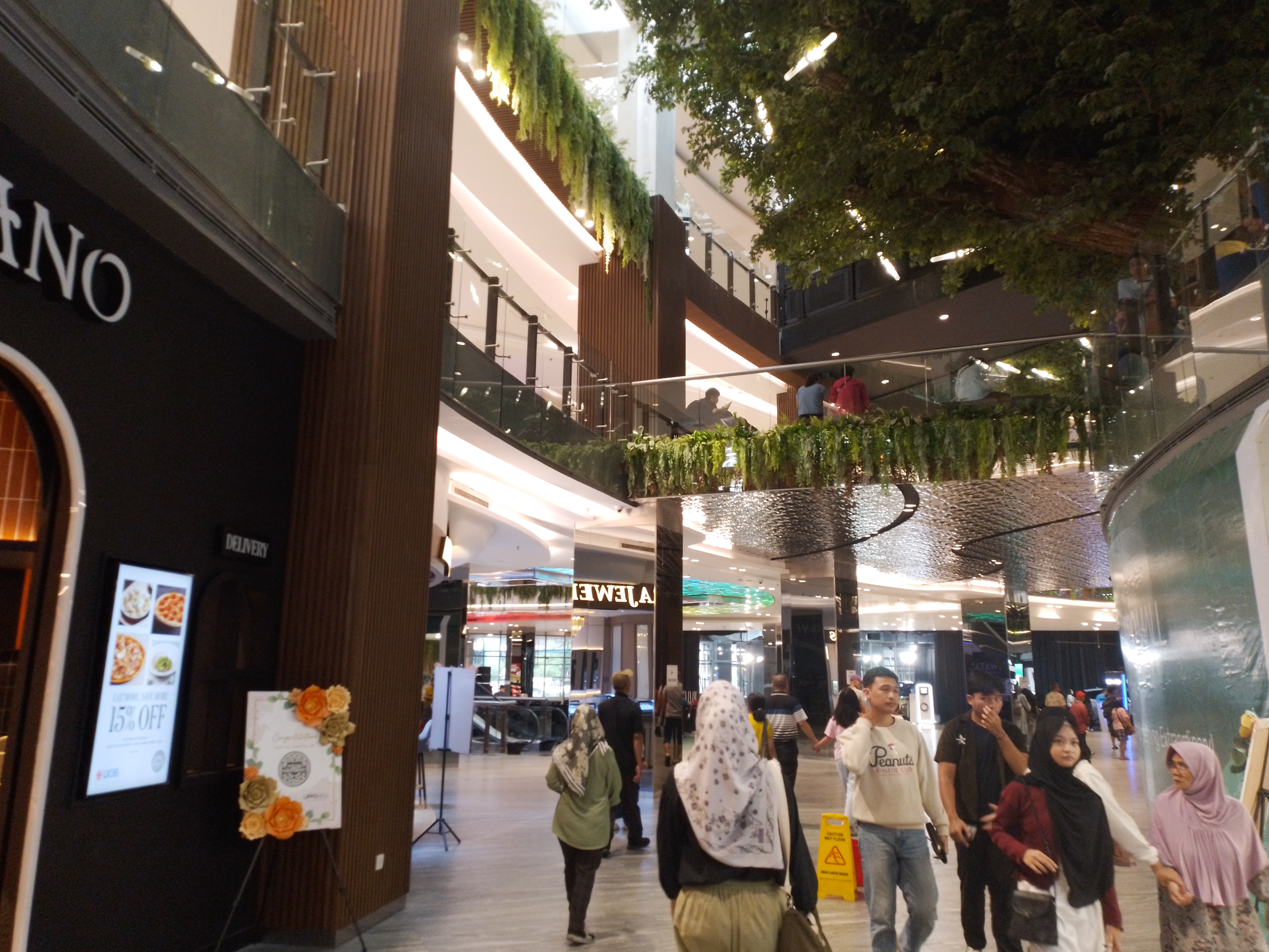
A circular corridor of the mall, surrounding the Balai Sarbini structure

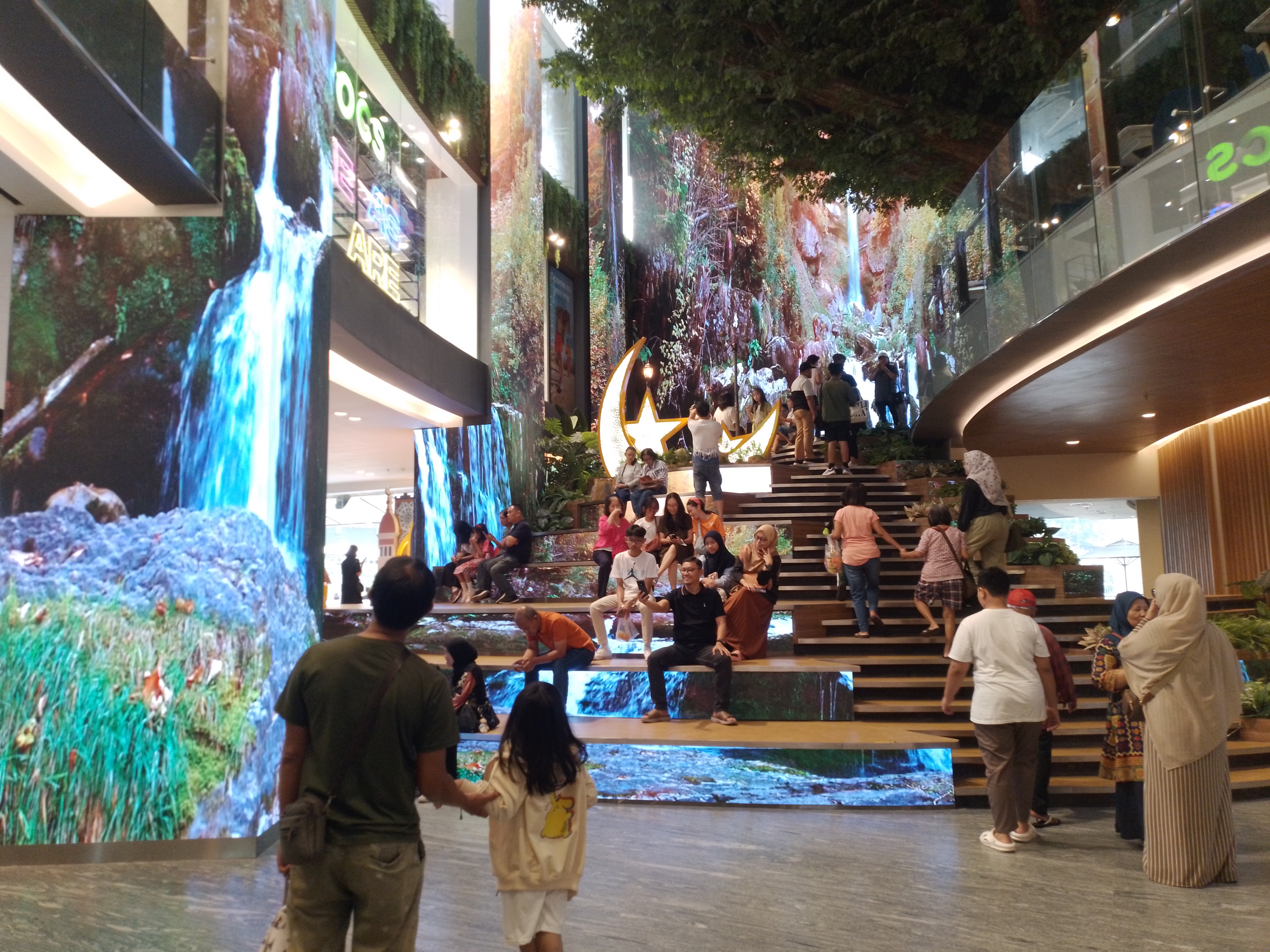
A public amphitheatre near the main lobby

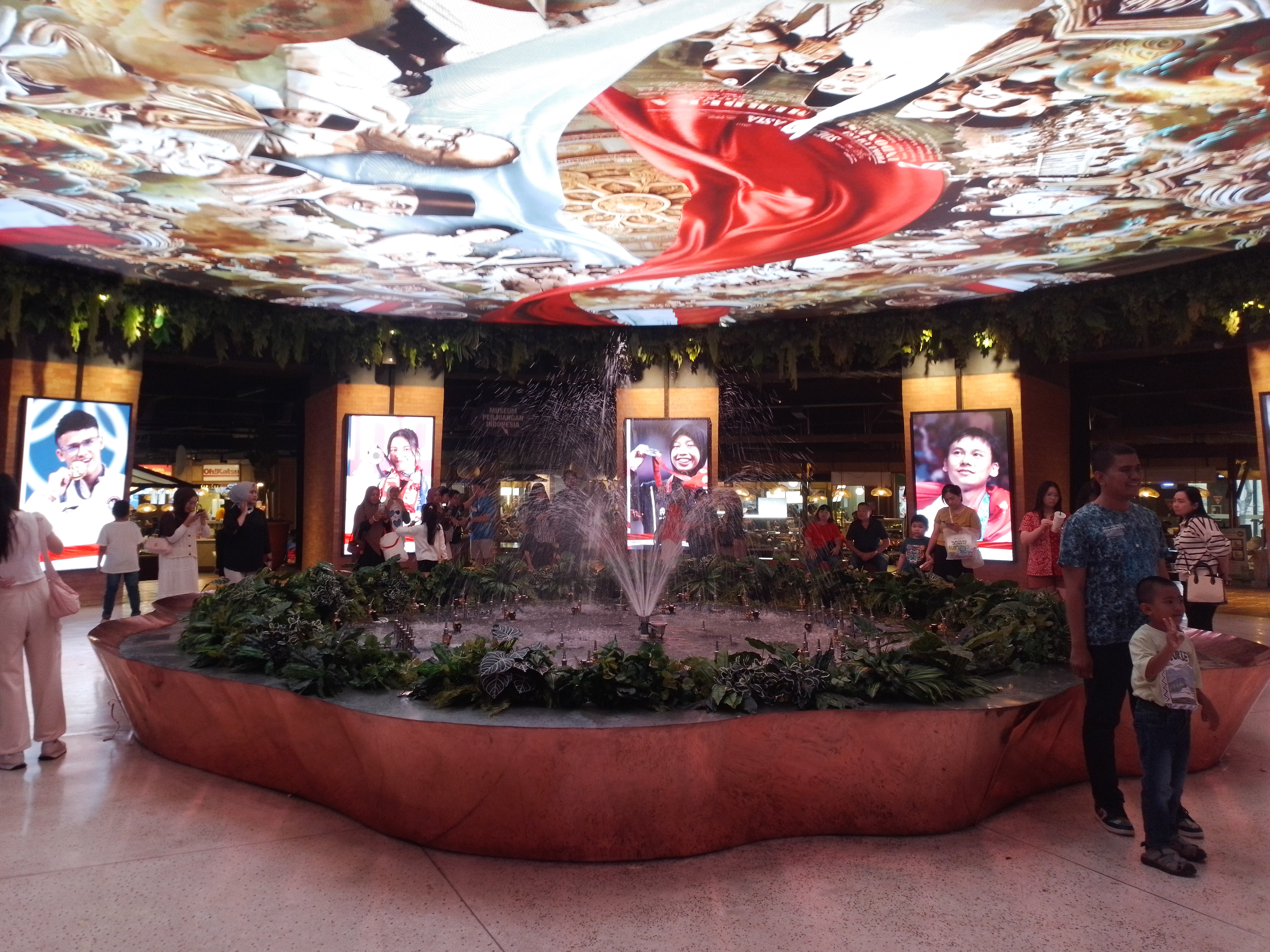
Water fountain at the center of Museum Perjuangan Indonesia, with a large LED ceiling screen

== See also ==
- Balai Sarbini
- List of shopping malls in Indonesia
  - List of shopping malls in Jakarta

== Cited works ==
- Merrillees, Scott (2015). Jakarta: Portraits of a Capital 1950-1980. Jakarta: Equinox Publishing. ISBN 9786028397308.
