= Dukuh Atas (Transjakarta) =

Bus rapid transit station in Jakarta, Indonesia

1 09 Dukuh Atas
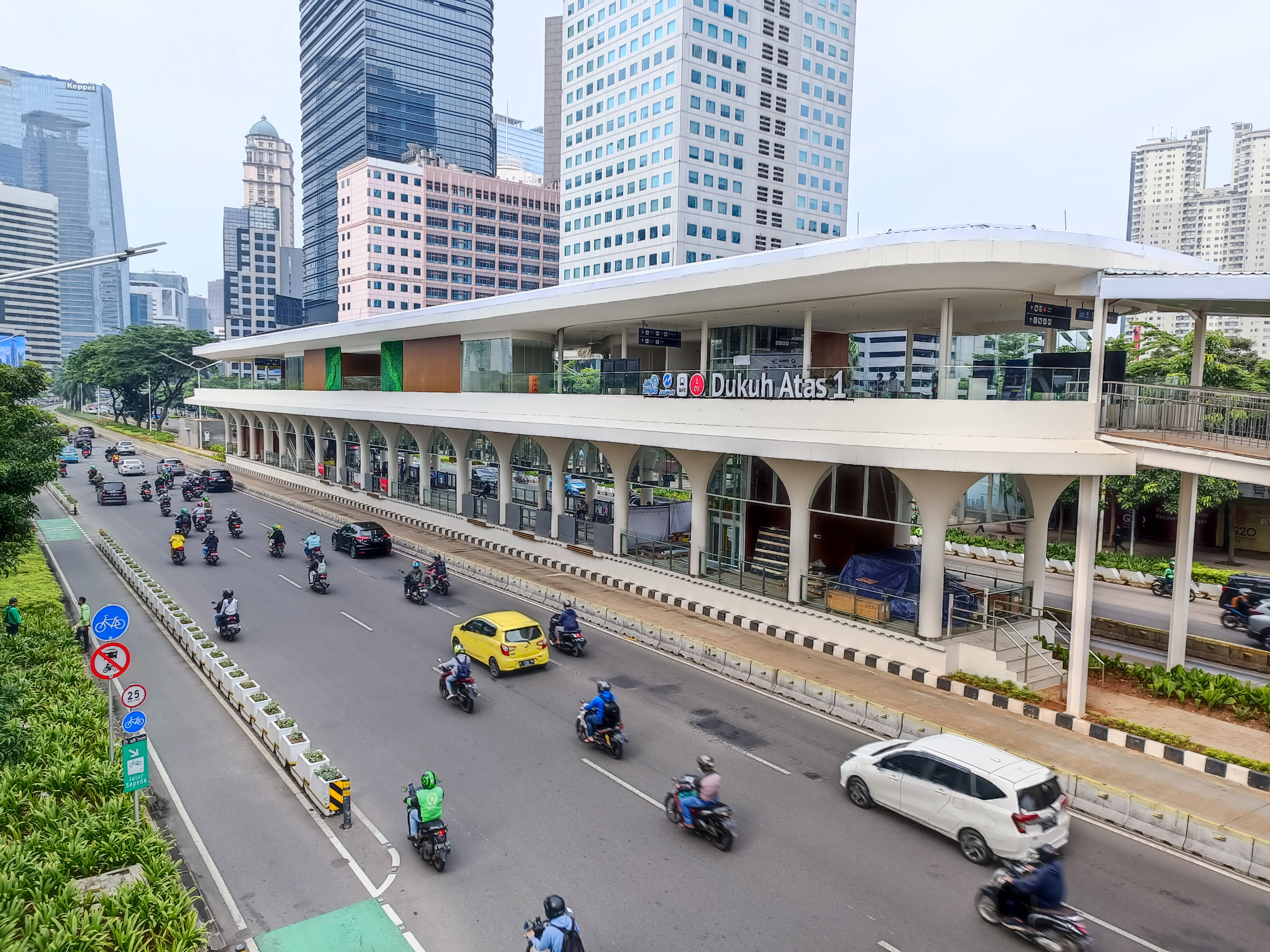
- The station view from pedestrian bridge

General information
- Location: Jenderal Sudirman Street; Karet Tengsin, Tanah Abang, Central Jakarta (western side); Setiabudi, Setiabudi, South Jakarta (eastern side); Indonesia
- Coordinates: 6.2052839°S 106.8222872°E
- System: Transjakarta bus rapid transit station
- Owner: Transjakarta
- Operator: Transjakarta
- Lines: List of Transjakarta corridors#Corridor 1 List of TransJakarta corridors#Cross-corridor routes
- Platforms: Single island platform
- Connections: Galunggung; Dukuh Atas BNI; BNI City; Sudirman; Dukuh Atas Bank Syariah Indonesia

Construction
- Structure type: At-grade
- Cycle facilities: No
- Architect: Kuncara Wicaksana

Other information
- Status: In service

History
- Opened: 15 January 2004
- Rebuilt: 4 March 2023
- Former names: Dukuh Atas 1

Services
Preceding		Following
Karet towards Blok M	Corridor 1	Tosari towards Kali Besar
Karet towards Ragunan	Corridor 6 Route 6B	Tosari towards Balai Kota
Halimun towards Pulo Gadung	Corridor 4 transfer at Galunggung	Terminus
Setiabudi Integritas towards Ragunan	Corridor 6 Terminus transfer at Galunggung	Flyover Kuningan One-way operation
Location

Dukuh Atas is a Transjakarta bus rapid transit station located at the Dukuh Atas TOD zone, between South Jakarta and Central Jakarta, Indonesia. It primarily serves corridor 1, and it is a transit point to corridors 4 and 6 via the Galunggung station to the northeast. To the south after this station, the Setiabudi BRT station once stood, which has been closed since 2014.

== History ==
Dukuh Atas BRT station was inaugurated along with the soft operational launch of Transjakarta Corridor 1 and all of its stations on 15 January 2004. The commercial operation began on 1 February 2004. It was originally in a form of a small building, which only had 2 platform bays (one for each direction).

In 2006, as a preparation for the construction of two new corridors 4 and 6, the station received a major revitalization by creating a connection bridge to the then-under construction Dukuh Atas 2 (now Galunggung) BRT station, the terminus of both new corridors. The original Dukuh Atas BRT station was reopened on 27 January 2007, along with the opening of corridors 4 and 6. The platform bays were increased from 2 to 6 (3 for each direction). Since then, it was formally named Dukuh Atas 1 (until December 2023) to distinguish itself with the newly-built Dukuh Atas 2.

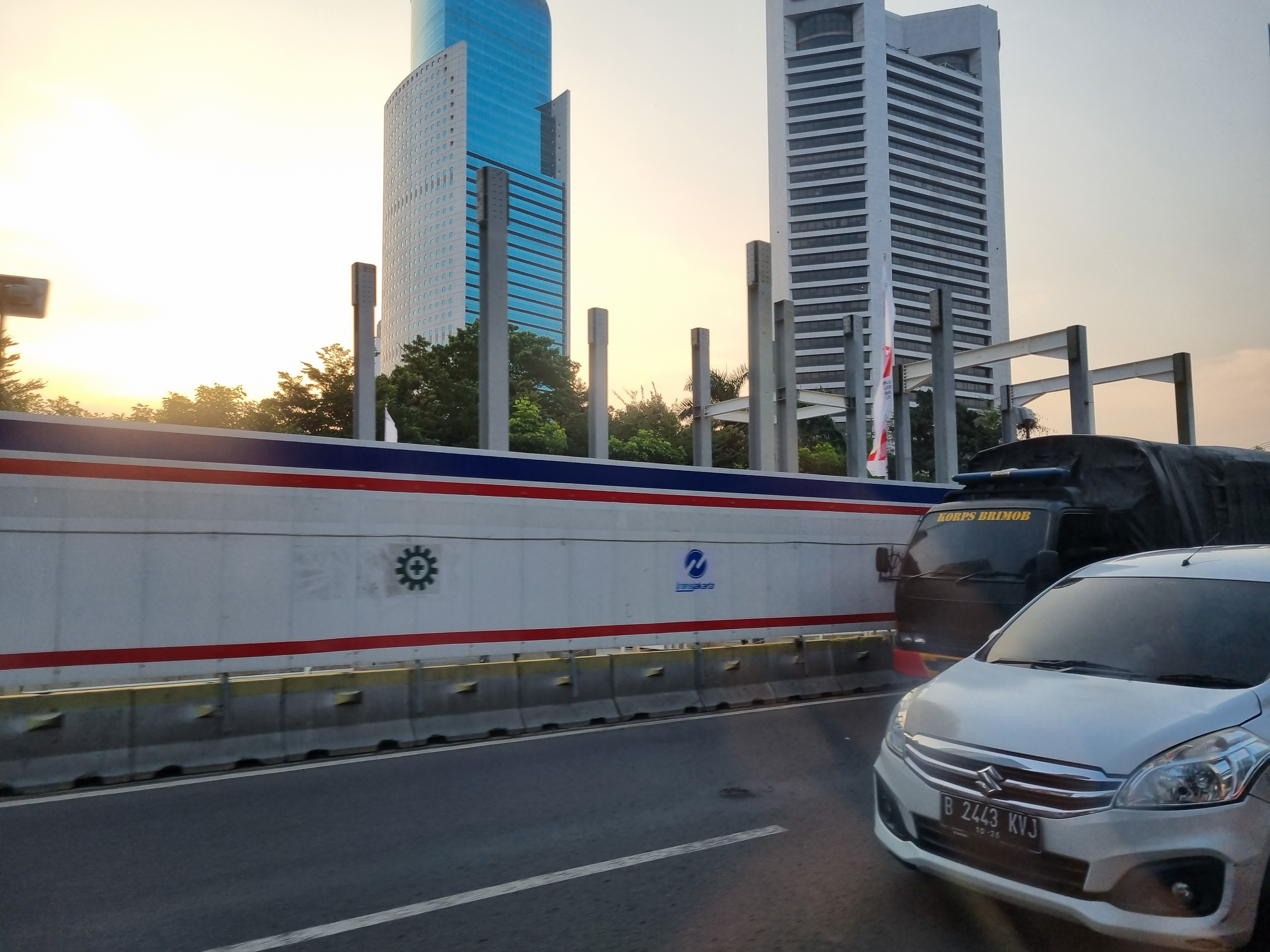
The revitalization progress of the bus station, as of 17 August 2022

On 15 April 2022, the Dukuh Atas 1 BRT station was closed for a second revitalization along with 10 other stations. A shuttle bus route between the Semanggi Interchange and National Monument was operated to accommodate passengers during the BRT station revitalization process. The shuttle bus route was closed on 11 September 2022. After being revitalized, the Dukuh Atas 1 station, along with M.H. Thamrin, Juanda, and Jatipadang BRT stations were reopened on 4 March 2023.

== Building and layout ==
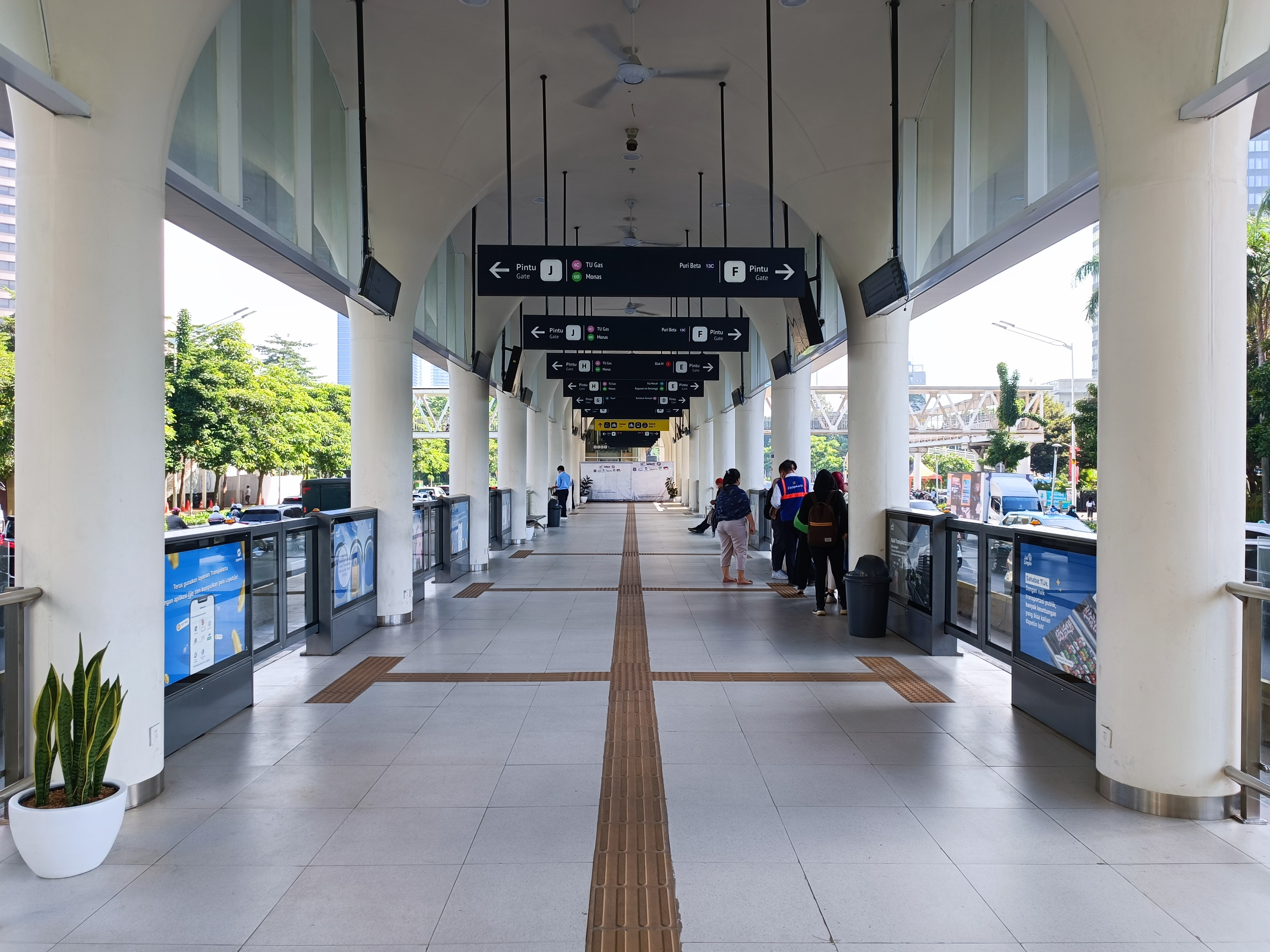
The platform of the BRT station

The new building of Dukuh Atas BRT station has two floors, the 1st floor as the platform floor for passenger boarding and alighting, and the 2nd floor as a concourse as well as integration access to the Galunggung BRT station and also the Dukuh Atas Bank Syariah Indonesia LRT station. This station is also equipped with escalators and elevators.

West	to Kota and to Balai Kota (Tosari) →
island platform, the platform doors are opened on the right side of the direction of travel
East	← (Karet) to Blok M and to Ragunan

== Non-BRT bus services ==
Public transportation type	Route	Destination	Notes
Inner city feeder		Blok M–Senen	Outside the station
Inner city feeder		Pasar Minggu–Tanah Abang	Outside the station
#jakartaexplorer double-decker tour bus		Jakarta Skyscrapers (Pencakar Langit Jakarta)	Outside the station

== Places nearby ==
- Sudirman railway station
- BNI City railway station
- The Landamark
- Wisma KEIAI
  - Embassy of Costa Rica
- Wisma Bumiputera
- Gedung Arthaloka
- Wisma Indocement
- Wisma 46
- Menara Astra
- Shangri-La Hotel Jakarta

== Gallery ==
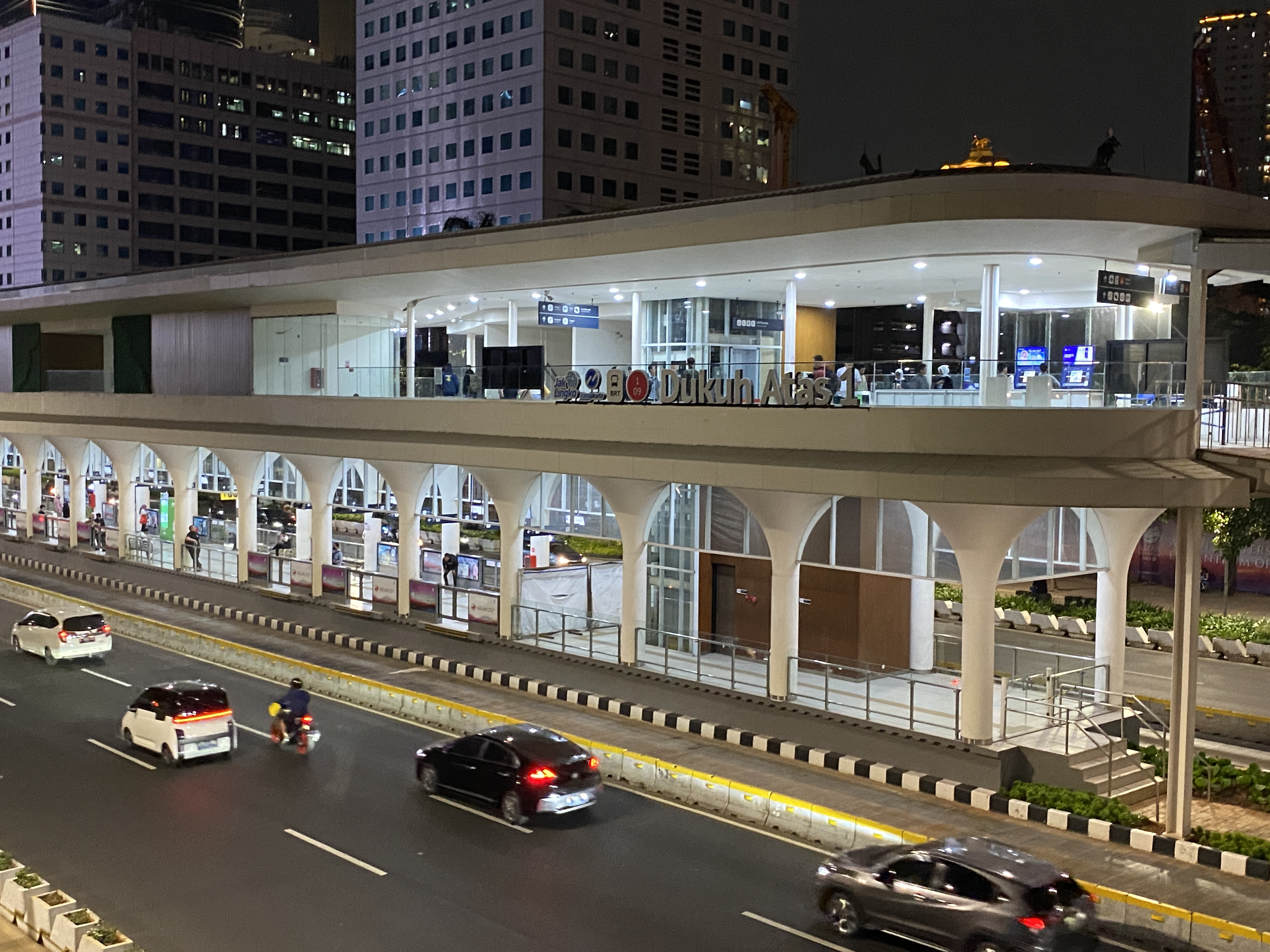
View at night

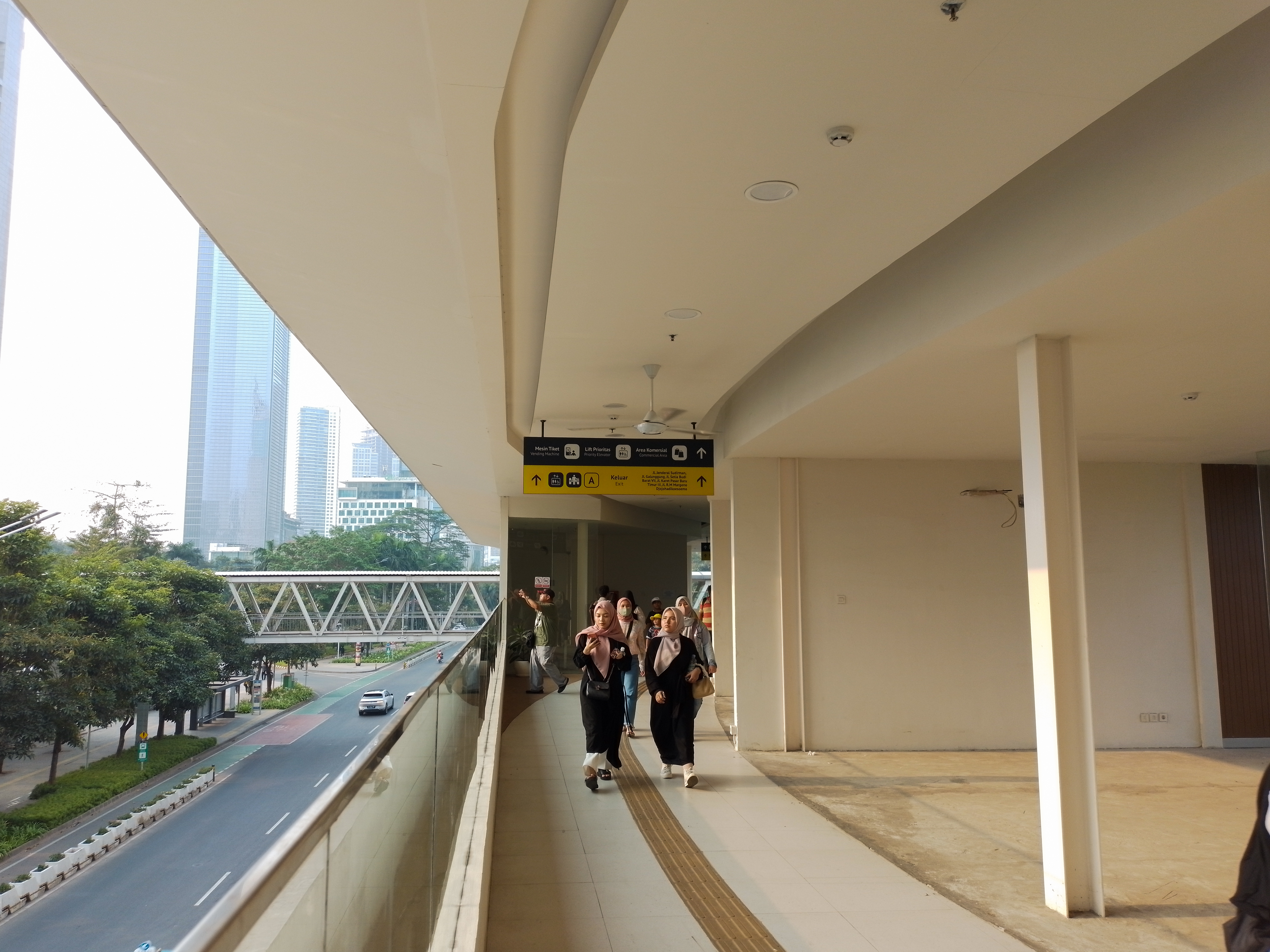
The commercial area on the second floor

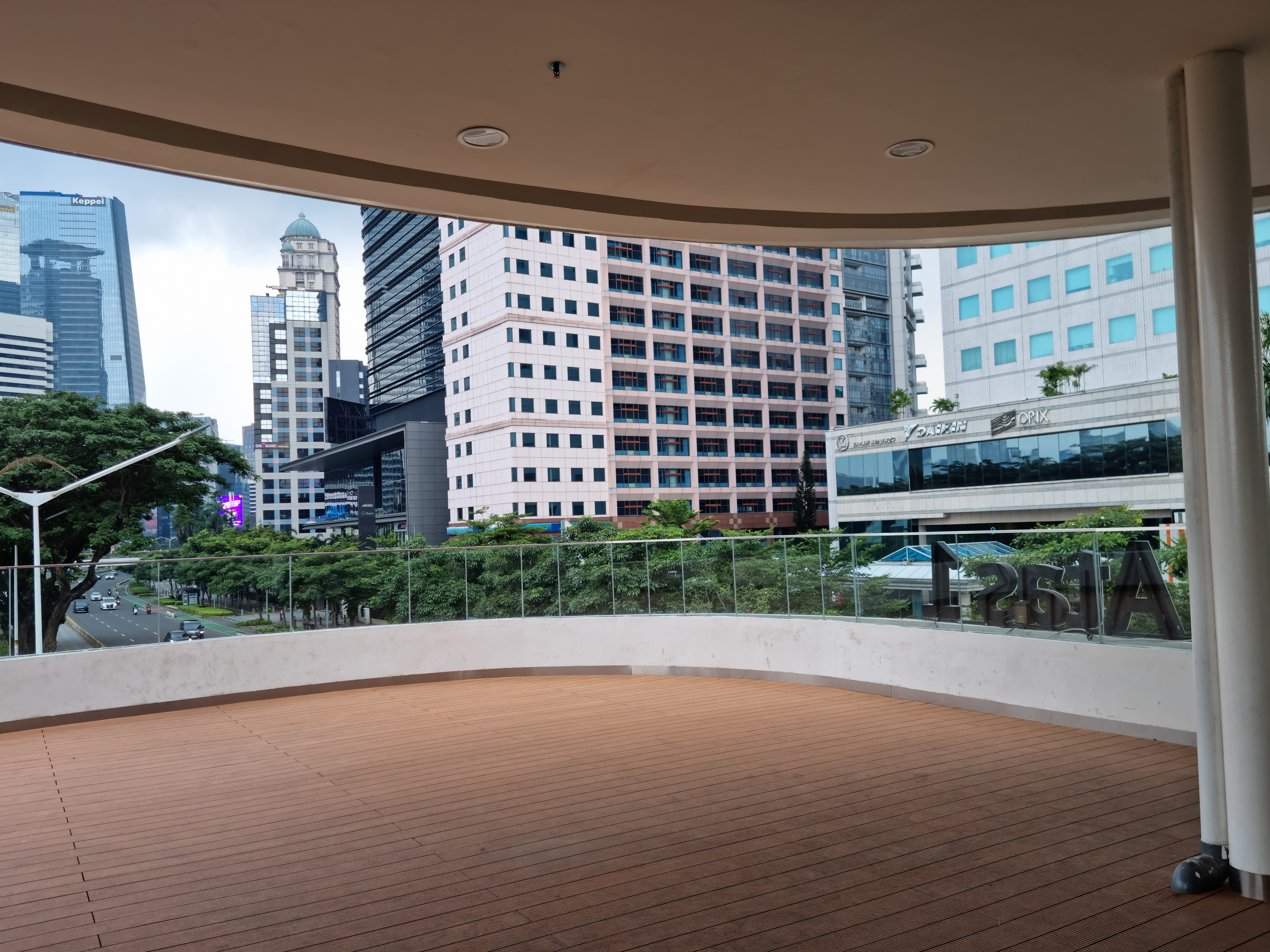
An open-air viewing deck at the south side

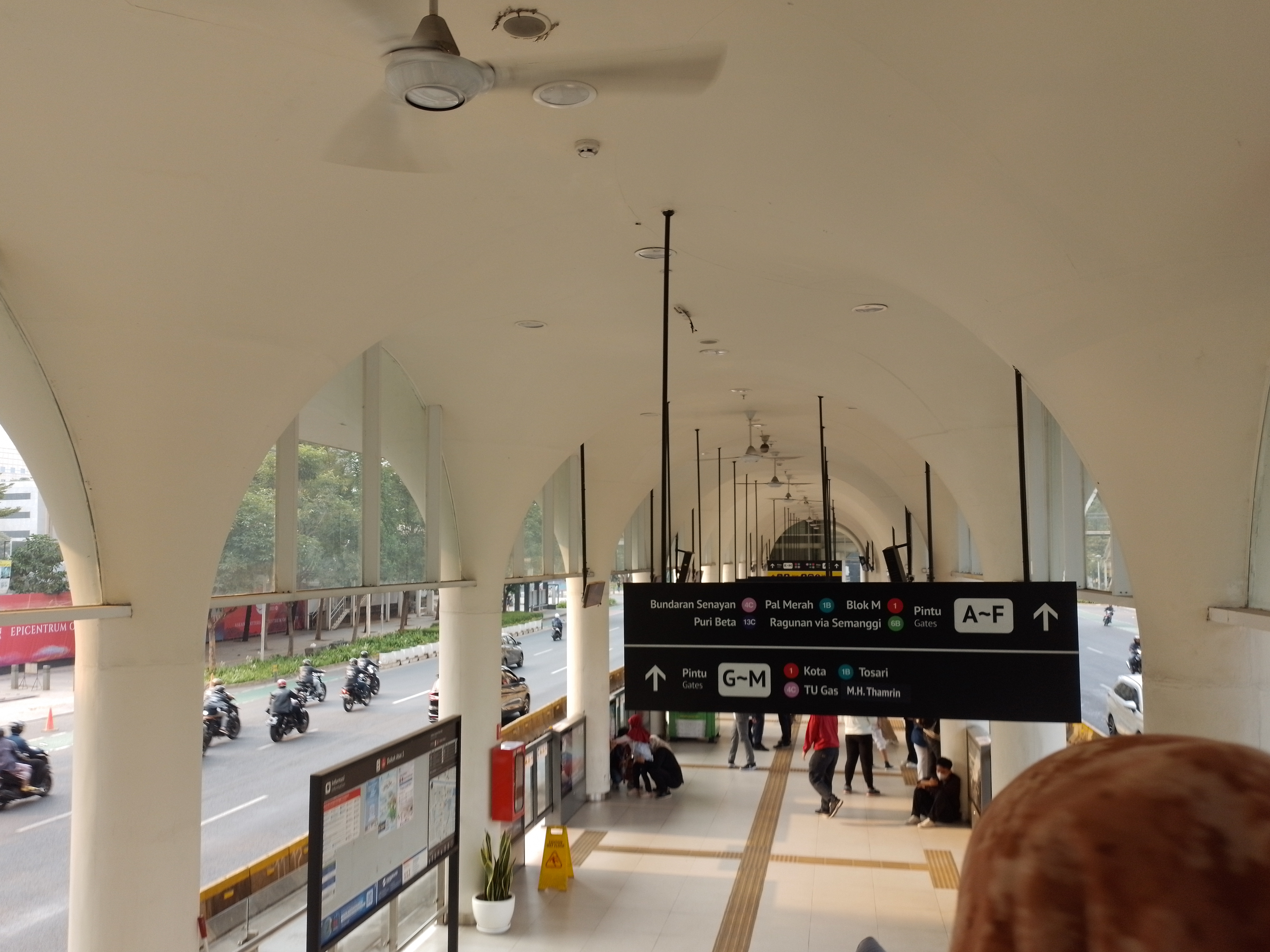
The platform area seen from stairs
