= Semanggi (Transjakarta) =

Bus rapid transit station in Jakarta, Indonesia

9 14 Semanggi
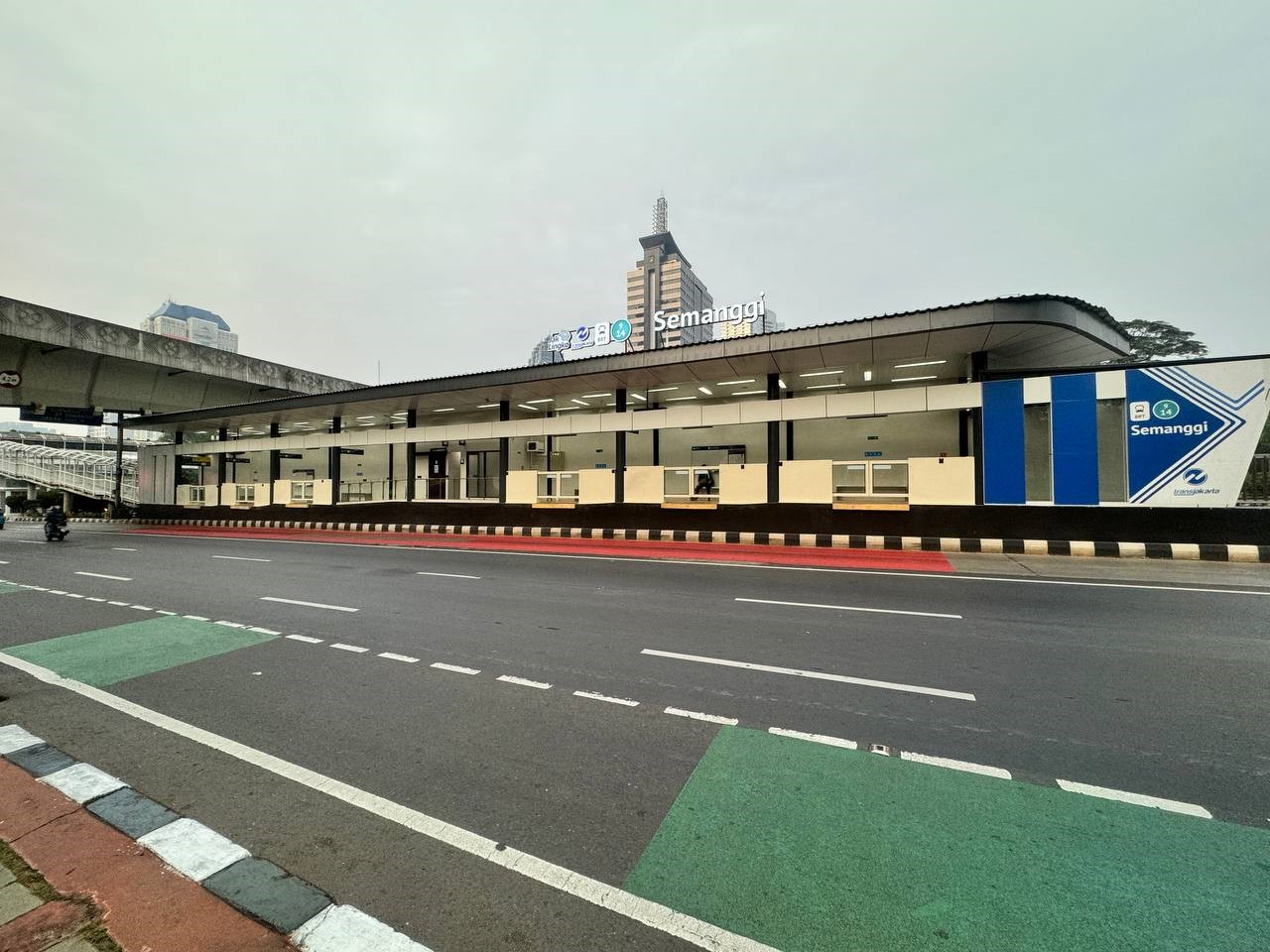
- Exterior of the north building for eastbound buses

General information
- Location: Jenderal Gatot Subroto Street Karet Semanggi, Setiabudi (eastern/northern side); Senayan, Kebayoran Baru (western/southern side) South Jakarta, Indonesia
- Coordinates: 6.2209°S 106.8131°E
- System: Transjakarta bus rapid transit station
- Owner: Transjakarta
- Operator: Transjakarta
- Lines: List of TransJakarta corridors#Cross-corridor routes List of TransJakarta corridors#Corridor 9
- Platforms: Two side platforms connected with a linkway
- Connections: Bendungan Hilir

Construction
- Structure type: At-grade
- Cycle facilities: No

Other information
- Status: In service

History
- Opened: 31 December 2010
- Rebuilt: 25 July 2024; 2 years ago

Services
Preceding		Following
Widya Chandra Telkomsel One-way operation	Corridor 6 Route 6B	Karet towards Balai Kota
Widya Chandra Telkomsel towards Pinang Ranti	Corridor 9	Gerbang Pemuda towards Pluit
Widya Chandra Telkomsel towards Cililitan	Corridor 9 Route 9A	Gerbang Pemuda towards Grogol Reformasi
Widya Chandra Telkomsel towards Pinang Ranti	Corridor 9 Route 9C	Senayan Bank Jakarta One-way operation
Polda Metro Jaya towards Blok M	Corridor 1 transfer at Bendungan Hilir	Karet towards Kali Besar
Location

Semanggi is a Transjakarta bus rapid transit station located on Jenderal Gatot Subroto Street at the border between Setiabudi and Kebayoran Baru districts, South Jakarta, Indonesia, serving Corridor 9. It is connected by a transfer linkway to Bendungan Hilir station that serves Corridor 1. The station is located at the southeastern end of the Semanggi Interchange ('Semanggi' is an Indonesian word for cloverleaf, thus meaning 'cloverleaf interchange'), hence the name.

== History ==
The station opened on 31 December 2010 with the rest of Corridor 9.

On 7 October 2023, this station and its Corridor 1 cousin Bendungan Hilir were closed for revitalisation works. During this time, Transjakarta modified affected BRT services to serve Komdak 1 and Komdak 2 bus stops.

Although Bendungan Hilir station reopened on 14 July 2024, this station only reopened 11 days later (25 July). Semanggi BRT station also officially ended Transjakarta's revitalisation project in which the company rebuilt 46 of its stations in the span of two years, being the last revitalised station to open for passenger service.

== Building and layout ==
The station comprises two structures: the northern structure for eastbound buses and southern structure for westbound buses. The two structures are separated in the middle by the Tomang-Cawang section of the Jakarta Inner Ring Road. The station is connected by Komdak skybridge that also provides the transfer linkway to Corridor 1, which, at 574 metres, is the longest skybridge in Jakarta.

After revitalisation works, the station features similar design to that of other revitalised Corridor 9 stations, with new amenities such as priority toilets and, in the northern structure, a new prayer room. There is also a new ticket concourse at the top.

East	towards Pinang Ranti and towards Cililitan (Widya Chandra Telkomsel) →
	Side platform, doors open on the right
	Jakarta Inner Ring Road →	(towards Bekasi/Bogor) →
← (towards Tangerang)	← Jakarta Inner Ring Road
	Side platform, doors open on the right
West	← (Gerbang Pemuda/Karet) towards Balai Kota, towards Pluit and towards Grogol Reformasi

== Non-BRT bus services ==
Type	Route	Destination	Notes
Inner city feeder		Blok M— Manggarai Station	Inside the station
Inner city feeder		Cibubur → Pluit	Inside the station
Inner city feeder		Pasar Minggu—Tanah Abang Station	Inside the station (towards Tanah Abang)
Inner city feeder		Pasar Minggu—Tanah Abang Station	Outside the station (towards Pasar Minggu)
Inner city feeder		Pasar Minggu—Tanah Abang Station	Outside the station
Royaltrans (premium)		Blok M—Cibubur Junction	Outside the station
Royaltrans (premium)		Cibubur Junction—Balai Kota	Outside the station
Royaltrans (premium)		Summarecon Mall Bekasi—Blok M	Outside the station

== Places nearby ==
- Lippo Mall Nusantara
  - Gedung Veteran RI, headqarters of the Veterans' Legion of Indonesia
  - Balai Sarbini
- Greater Jakarta Metropolitan Regional Police (Kepolisian Daerah Metropolitan Jakarta Raya (Polda Metro Jaya, PMJ)) headquarters
- Mangkuluhur City
- Wisma Danantara, headquarters of Danantara Indonesia

== Gallery ==
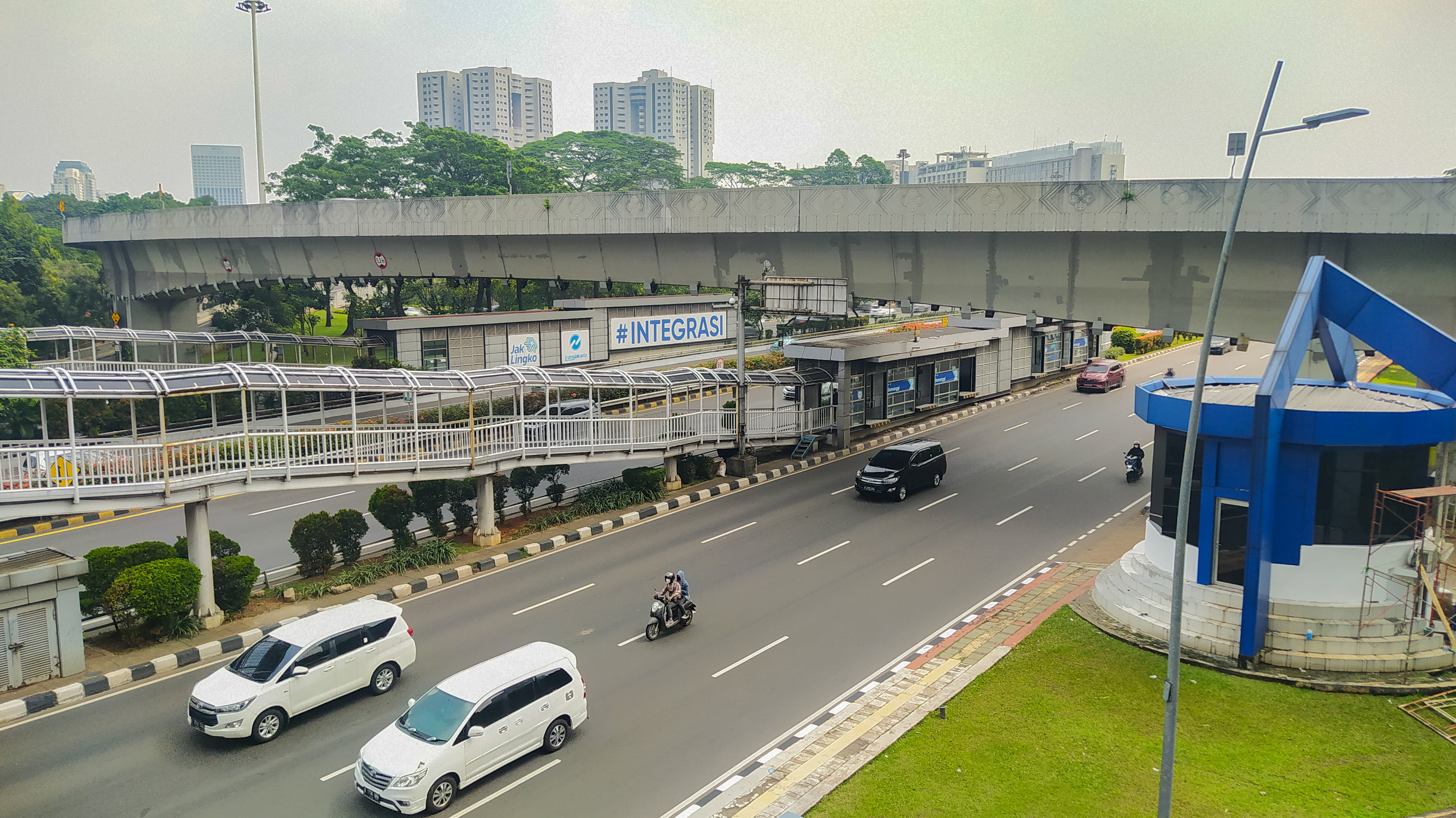
The station prior to revitalisation works, 2022

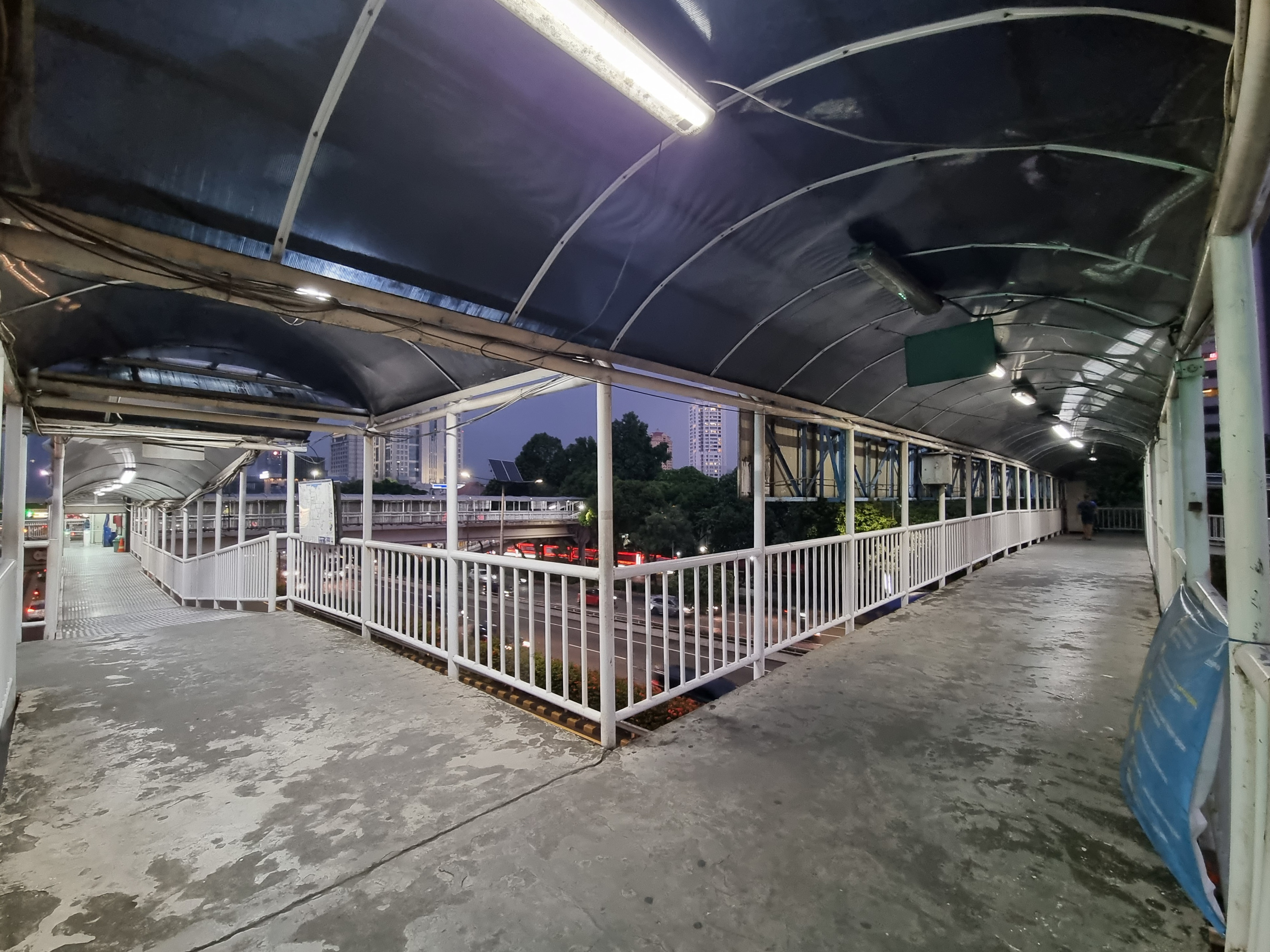
Transfer linkway to Corridor 1, 2022

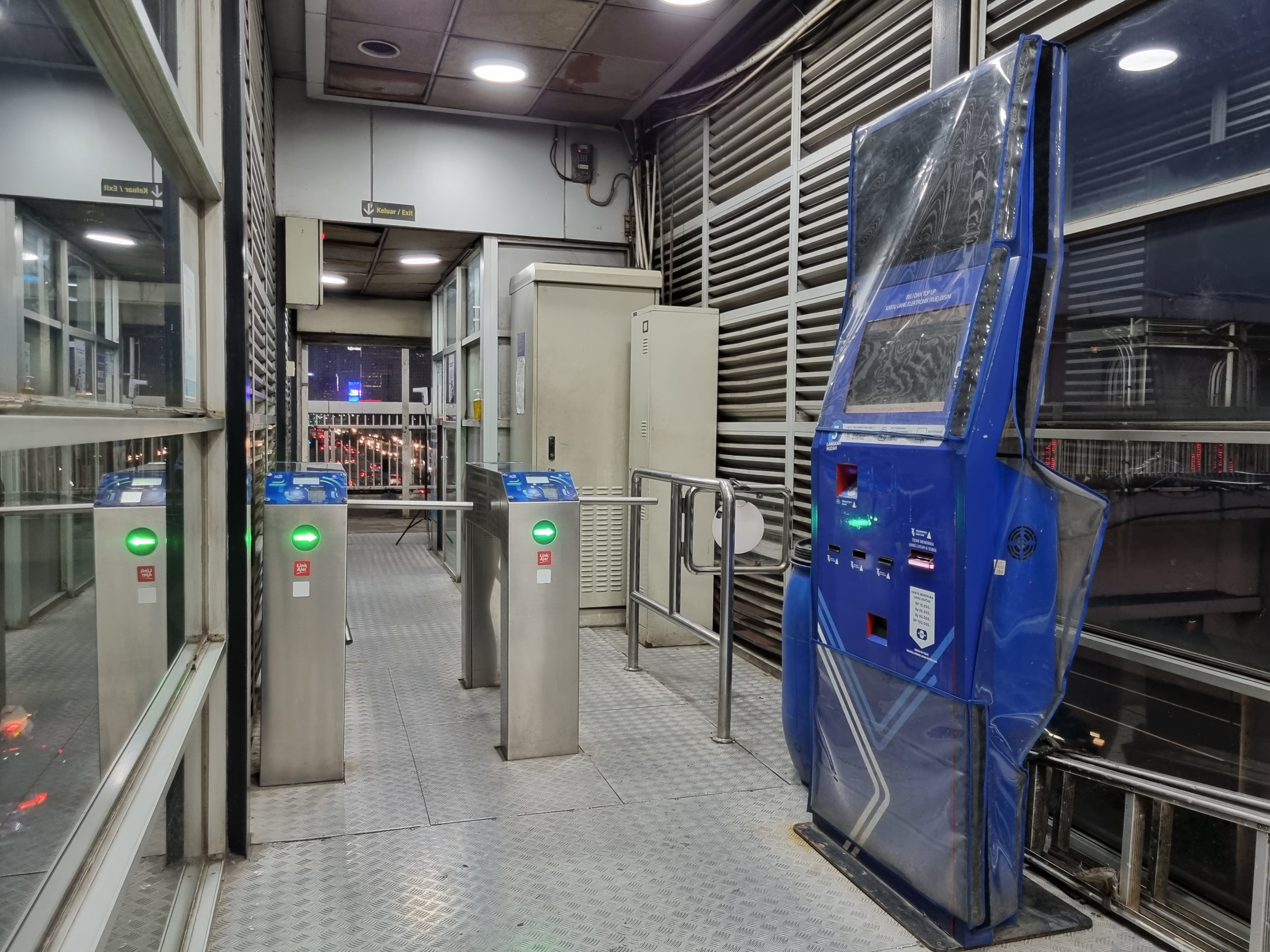
Ticket concourse prior to revitalisation, 2022

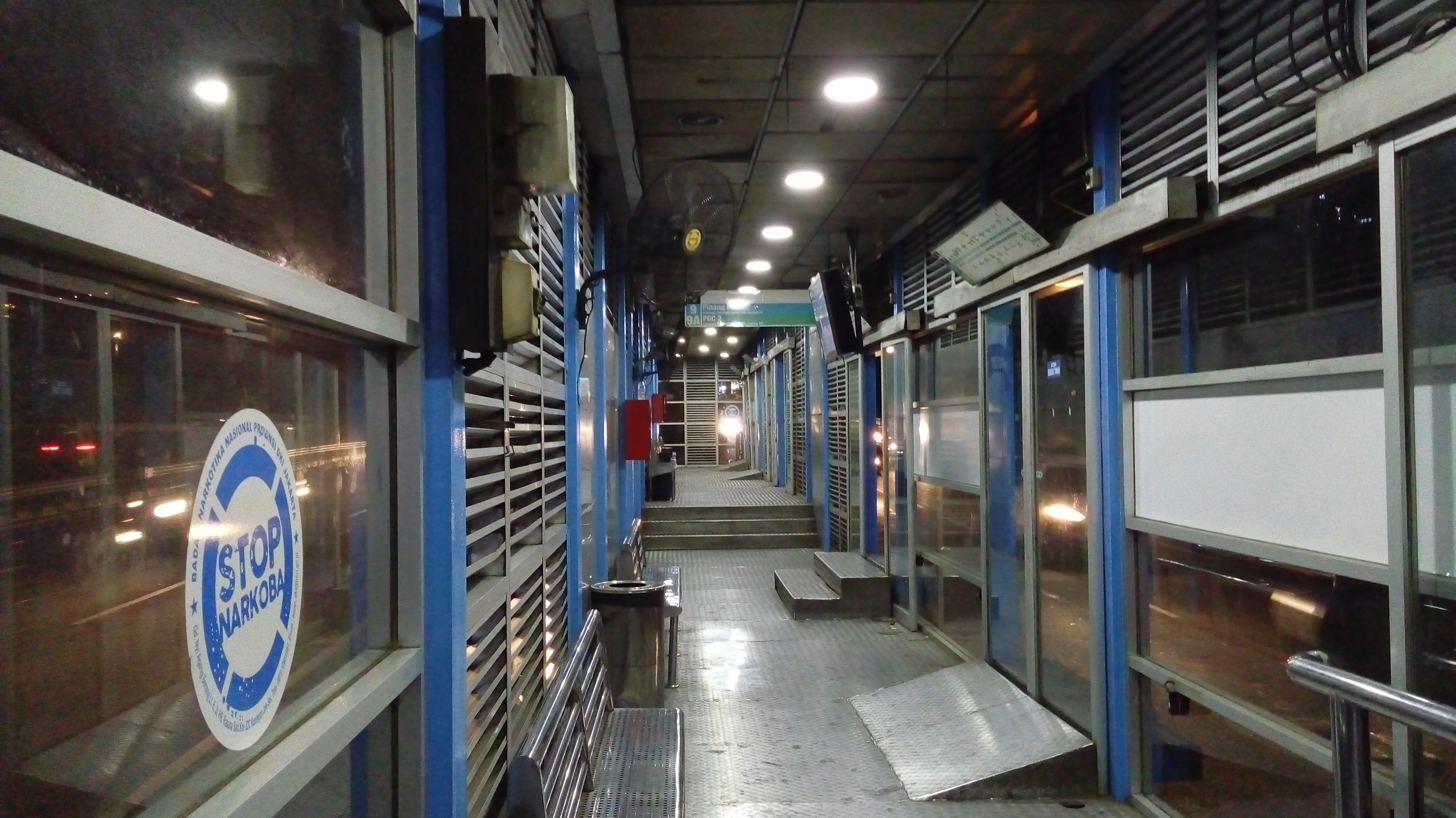
Interior of the platform, 2017

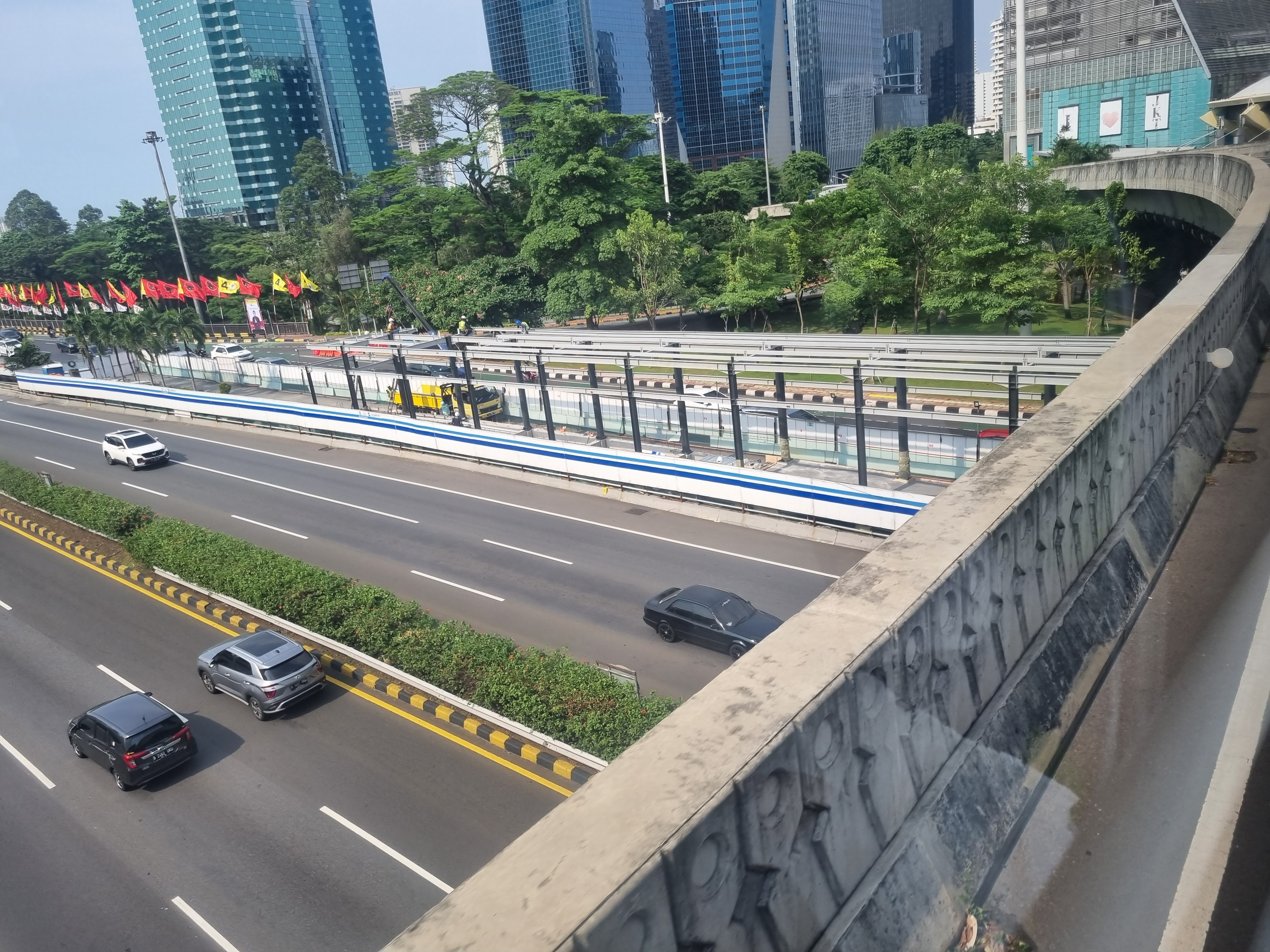
The station under revitalisation, 2023

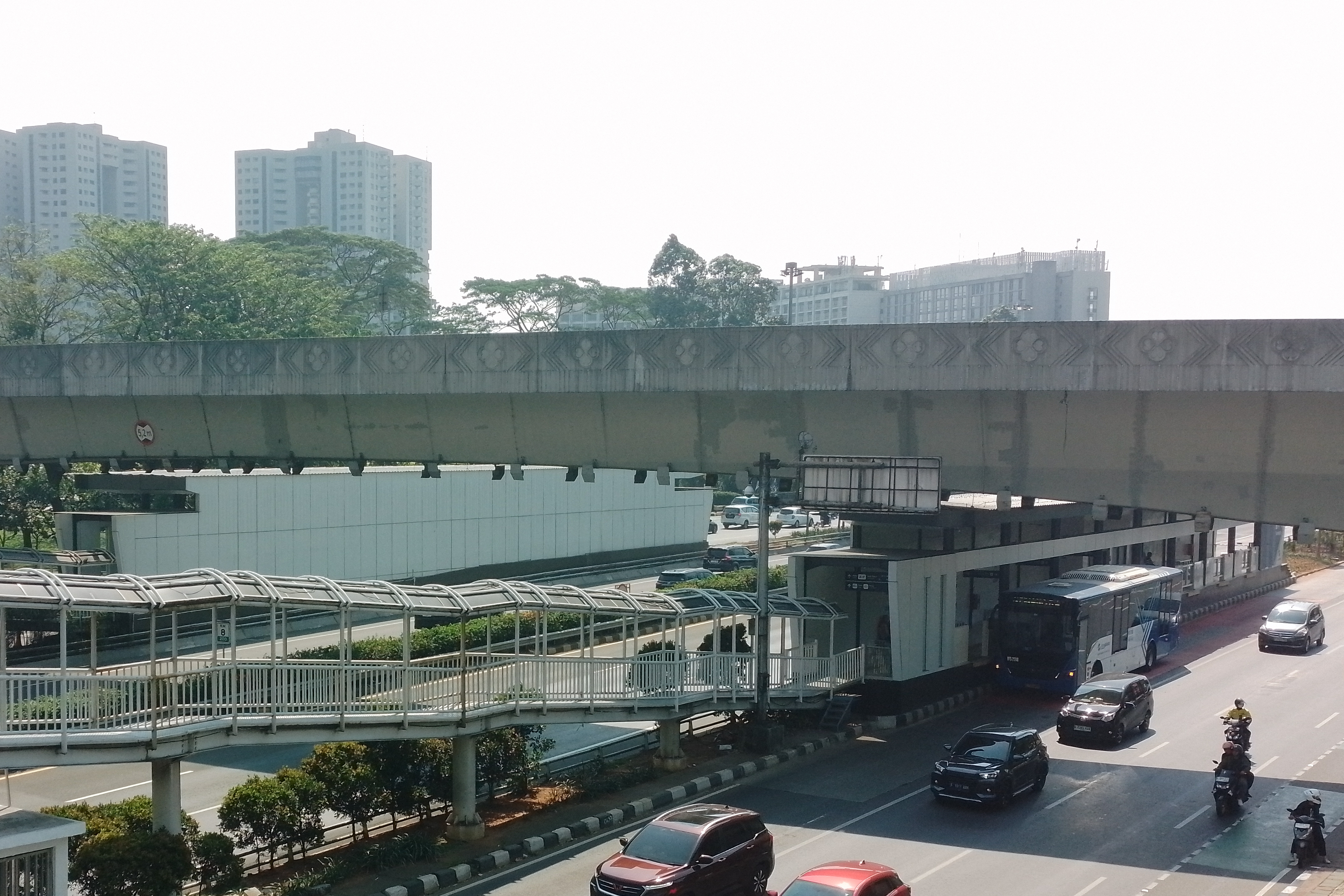
The station after revitalisation works, 2024

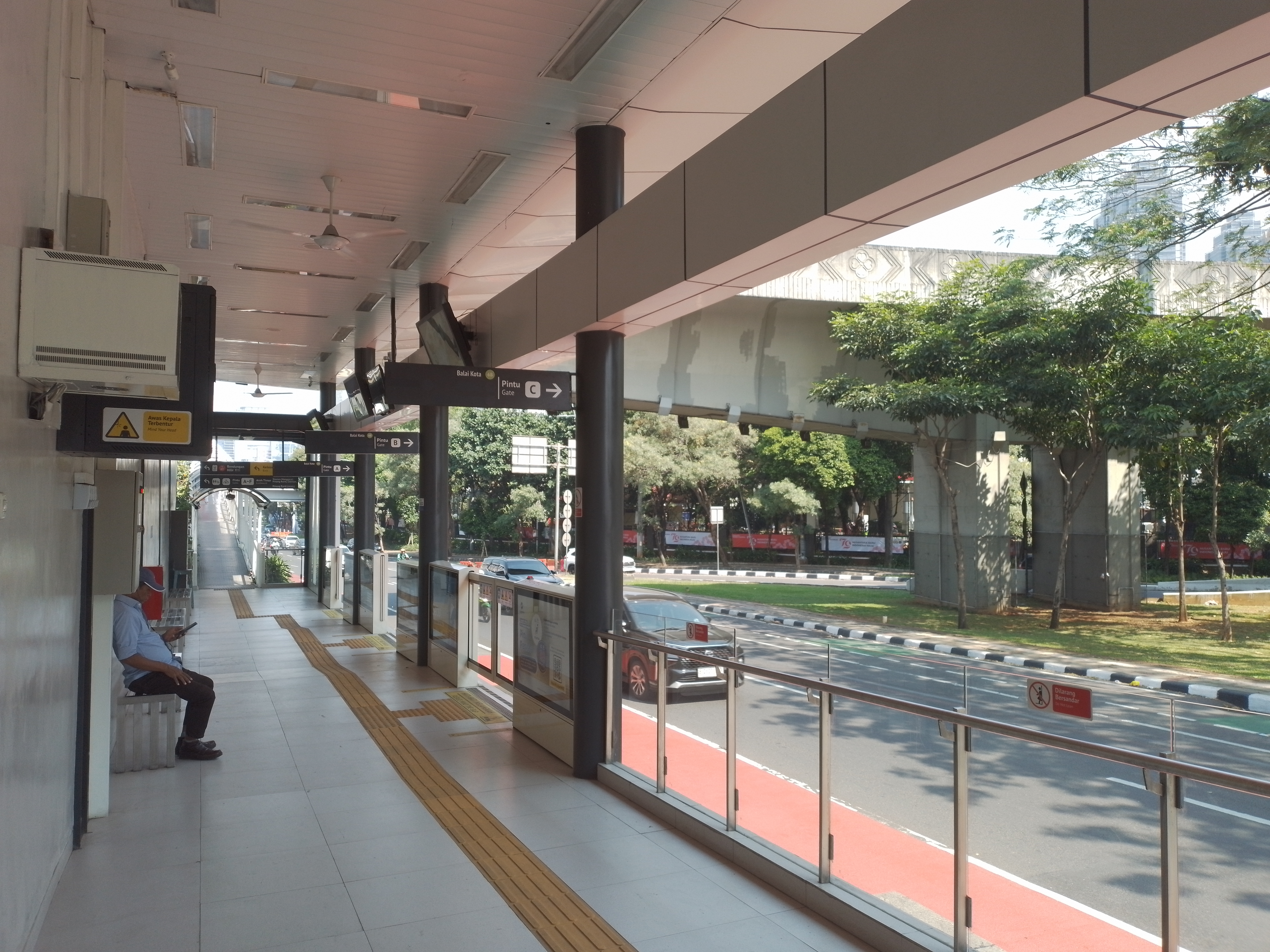
Interior of the revitalised station, 2024
