= Widya Chandra Telkomsel (Transjakarta) =

Transit station in Jakarta, Indonesia

9 13 Widya Chandra Telkomsel
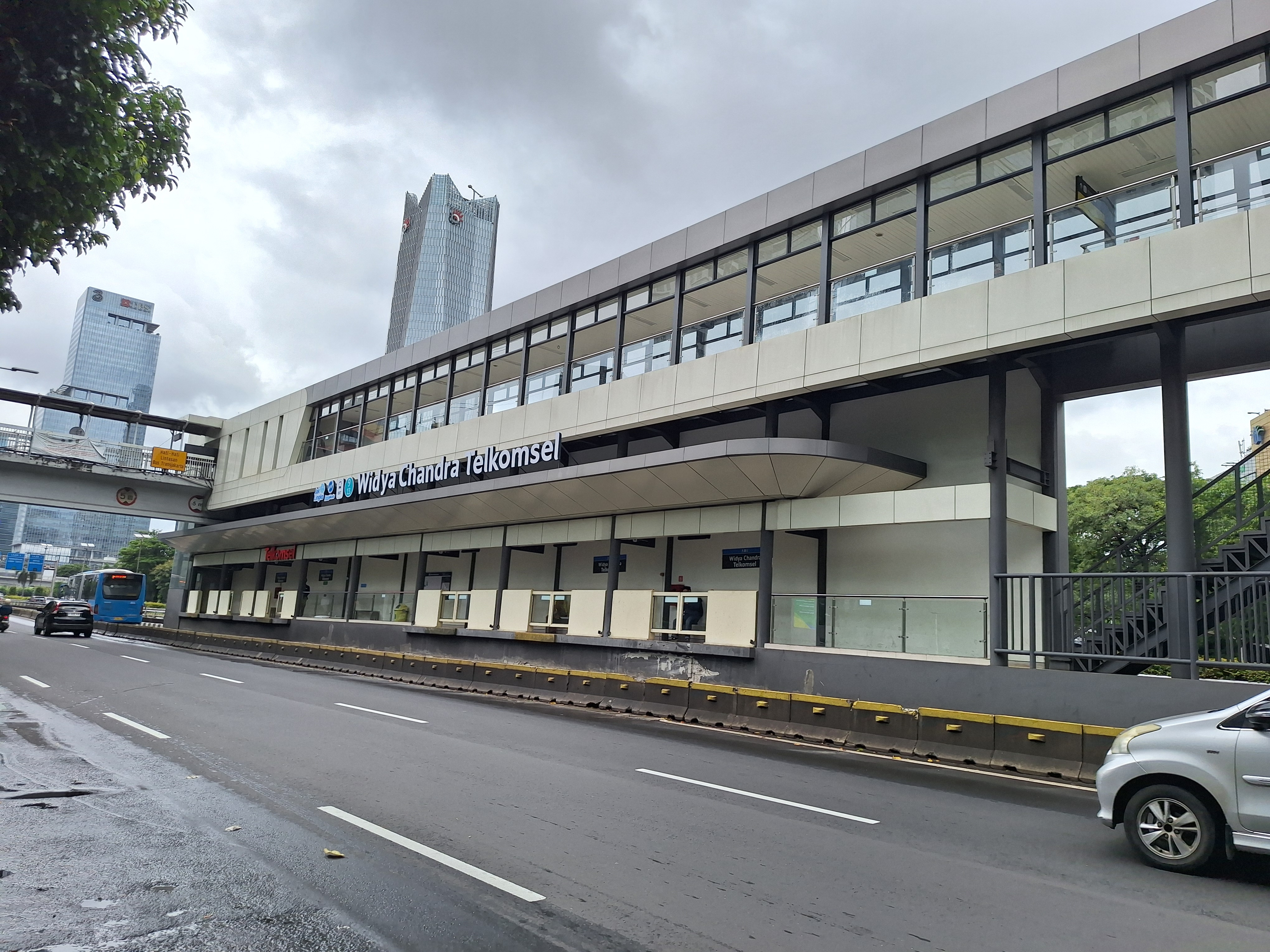
- Exterior of the northwest building for eastbound buses

General information
- Location: Jenderal Gatot Subroto St., Karet Semanggi, Setiabudi (northwest building) and Kuningan Barat, Mampang Prapatan (southeast building), South Jakarta, Jakarta, Indonesia
- Coordinates: 6.22703°S 106.817356°E
- System: Transjakarta
- Owner: Transjakarta
- Operator: Transjakarta
- Lines: List of TransJakarta corridors#Cross-corridor routes List of TransJakarta corridors#Corridor 9
- Platforms: Two side platforms

Construction
- Structure type: At-grade
- Accessible: Yes

History
- Opened: 31 December 2010
- Rebuilt: 2023
- Former names: Gatot Subroto LIPI

Services
Preceding		Following
Denpasar One-way operation	Corridor 6 Route 6B	Semanggi towards Balai Kota
Denpasar towards Ragunan	Corridor 6 Route 6B	Karet One-way operation
Denpasar towards Pinang Ranti	Corridor 9	Semanggi towards Pluit
Denpasar towards Cililitan	Corridor 9 Route 9A	Semanggi towards Grogol Reformasi
Denpasar One-way operation	Corridor 9 Route 9C	Senayan Bank Jakarta towards Bundaran Senayan
Denpasar towards Pinang Ranti	Corridor 9 Route 9C	Semanggi One-way operation
Location

Widya Chandra (or Widya Chandra Telkomsel, with Telkomsel granted for naming rights) is a Transjakarta bus rapid transit station located at the Gatot Subroto Street in Jakarta, Indonesia, serving Corridor 9. It is named after the ministerial official residence complex of Widya Chandra to the south.

== History ==
The BRT commenced operations as Gatot Subroto LIPI on 31 December 2010, alongside the entire Corridor 9. The name "Gatot Subroto" came from the street where it is located – taken after the national hero Gatot Soebroto (EYD: Gatot Subroto; 1907-1962), while "LIPI" refers to the adjacent headquarters of the now-defunct Indonesian Institute of Sciences at south.

On 4 September 2022, Gatot Subroto LIPI BRT station was temporarily closed for revitalization, alongside Senen Sentral, Kuningan Barat (now Simpang Kuningan) and SMK 57 (now Jati Barat) stations. Once completed, it was originally scheduled and reported to be reopened on 14 July 2023, but another report by detik.com revealed that it was postponed that day, and was pushed back 16 July.

In late December 2023, Gatot Subroto LIPI BRT station was renamed into Widya Chandra. It was an effort by Transjakarta to "neutralize" BRT station names from unofficial use of copyrighted third-party names: in this case "Gatot Subroto" as a historical figure, and "LIPI" as a government institution (though it was dissolved in 2021 in favor of the National Research and Innovation Agency or BRIN).

== Naming rights ==
After the renaming to Widya Chandra, on 18 December 2024, mobile telecommunications provider Telkomsel officially bought the naming rights for the BRT station, thus making it officially named Widya Chandra Telkomsel. This is due to the fact that the BRT station is located only few metres away from The Telkom Hub, heaquartes of Telkomsel and its parent company Telkom Indonesia, to the south.

== Building and layout ==
Widya Chandra Telkomsel BRT station consists of two separated buildings to the northwest (serving eastbound buses) and southeast (serving westbound buses); they are separated in the middle by the Jakarta Inner Ring Road, and connected by a footbridge. As the bridge has no separated paid area between the two, passengers whom wanted to change directions have to pay again.

The current 2023 buildings have wider, open-air two-storey buildings, with the upper floor utilized as the entrance and concourse area. Elevator are newly added for disabled access. The capacity has been significally upgraded from 138 to 924 people. The northwest building has six platform bays, while the southeast has four.

East/South	to Balai Kota	to Pluit, to Grogol Reformasi, and to Bundaran Senayan (Semanggi/Karet) →
	Side platform, the doors are opened on the right side of the travel direction
	Jakarta Inner Ring Road →		(to Tangerang) →
← (to Bekasi/Bogor)		← Jakarta Inner Ring Road
	Side platform, the doors are opened on the right side of the travel direction
West/North	← (Denpasar) to Pinang Ranti and to Cililitan	to Ragunan

== Non-BRT bus services ==
Service type	Route	Destination	Notes
Inner-city feeder		Manggarai–Blok M	Inside the station
Inner-city feeder		Cibubur → Pluit	Only operates on weekdays (Monday–Friday) on 05:00 - 06:00, one way towards Pluit only. Inside the statiom
Inner-city feeder		Pasar Minggu–Tanah Abang	Outside the station
Royaltrans (premium)		Cibubur–Blok M	Outside the station

== Nearby places ==
- Satriamandala Museum
- The Telkom Hub, headquarters of Telkom Indonesia and its subsidiary Telkomsel
- Ministry of Investment and Downstream Industry
- Wisma Danantara, headquarters of Danantara Indonesia
- Mulia Tower
- The Tower Jakarta
  - Bank Syariah Indonesia headquarters
- Graha Bpjamsostek
- Kartika Chandra Hotel

== Gallery ==
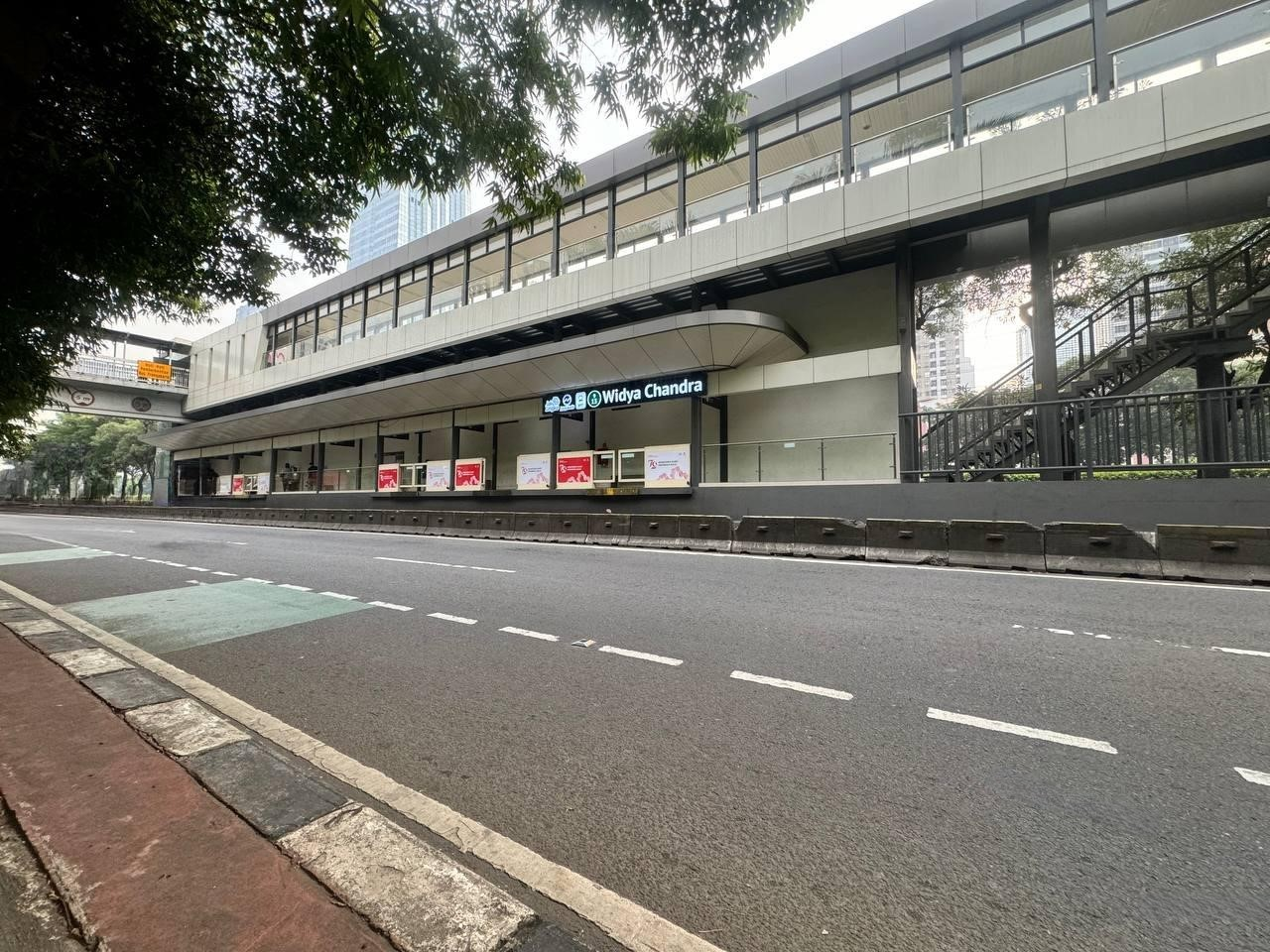
Exterior of the southeast building for westbound buses

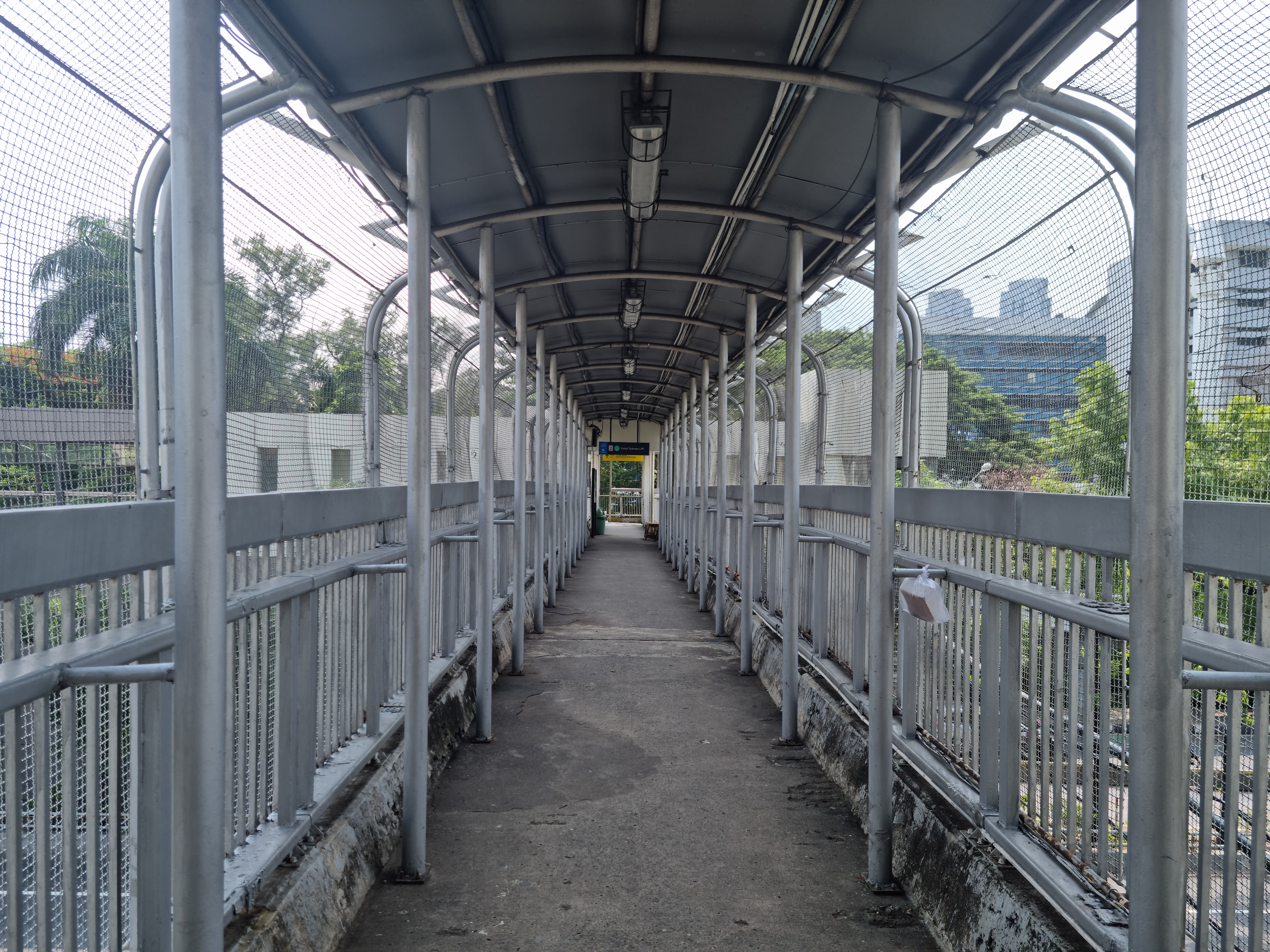
The access bridge above the Jakarta Inner Ring Road, note that there is no separated paid area between the two buildings

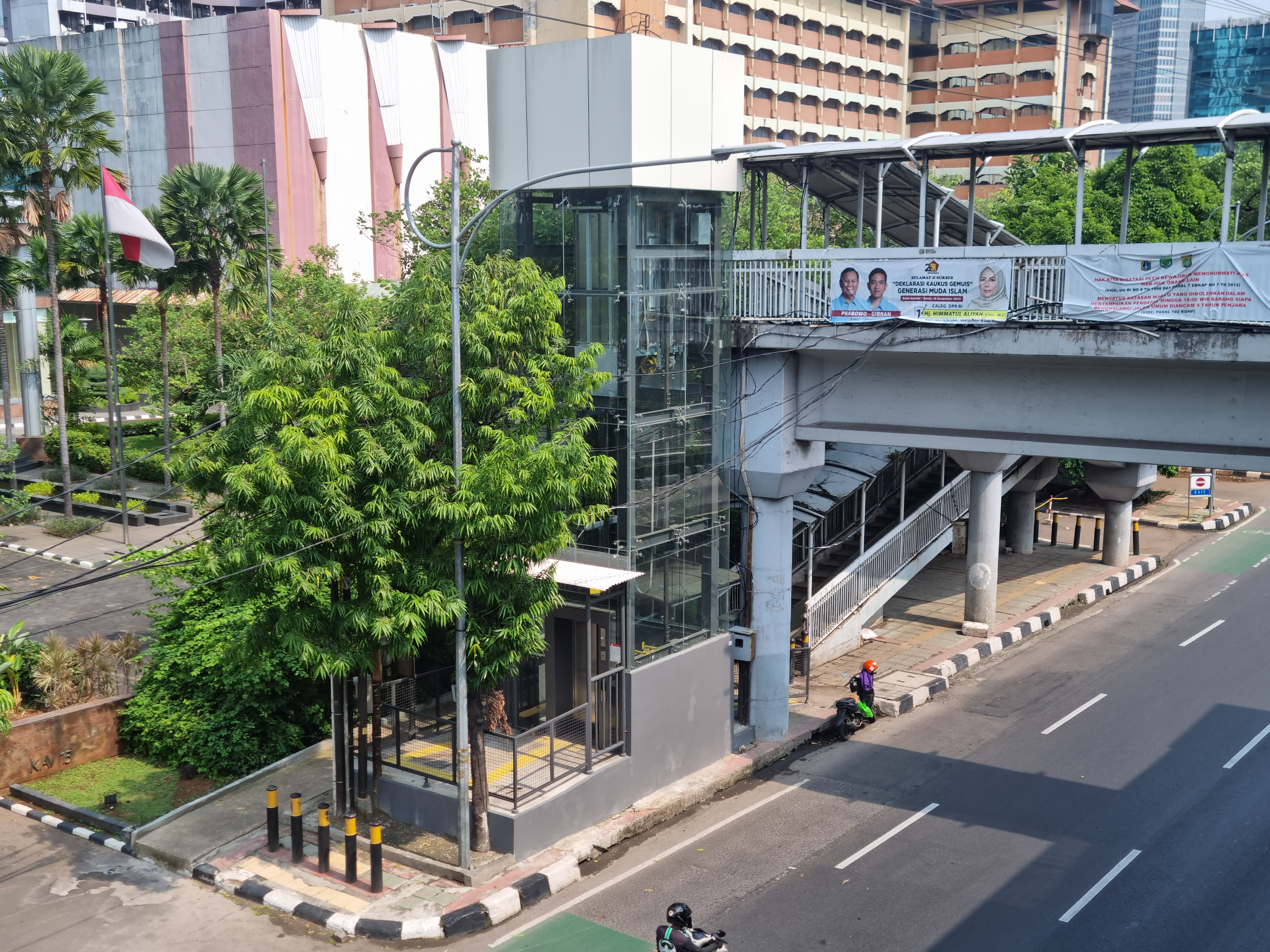
An elevator at the north side of the bridge

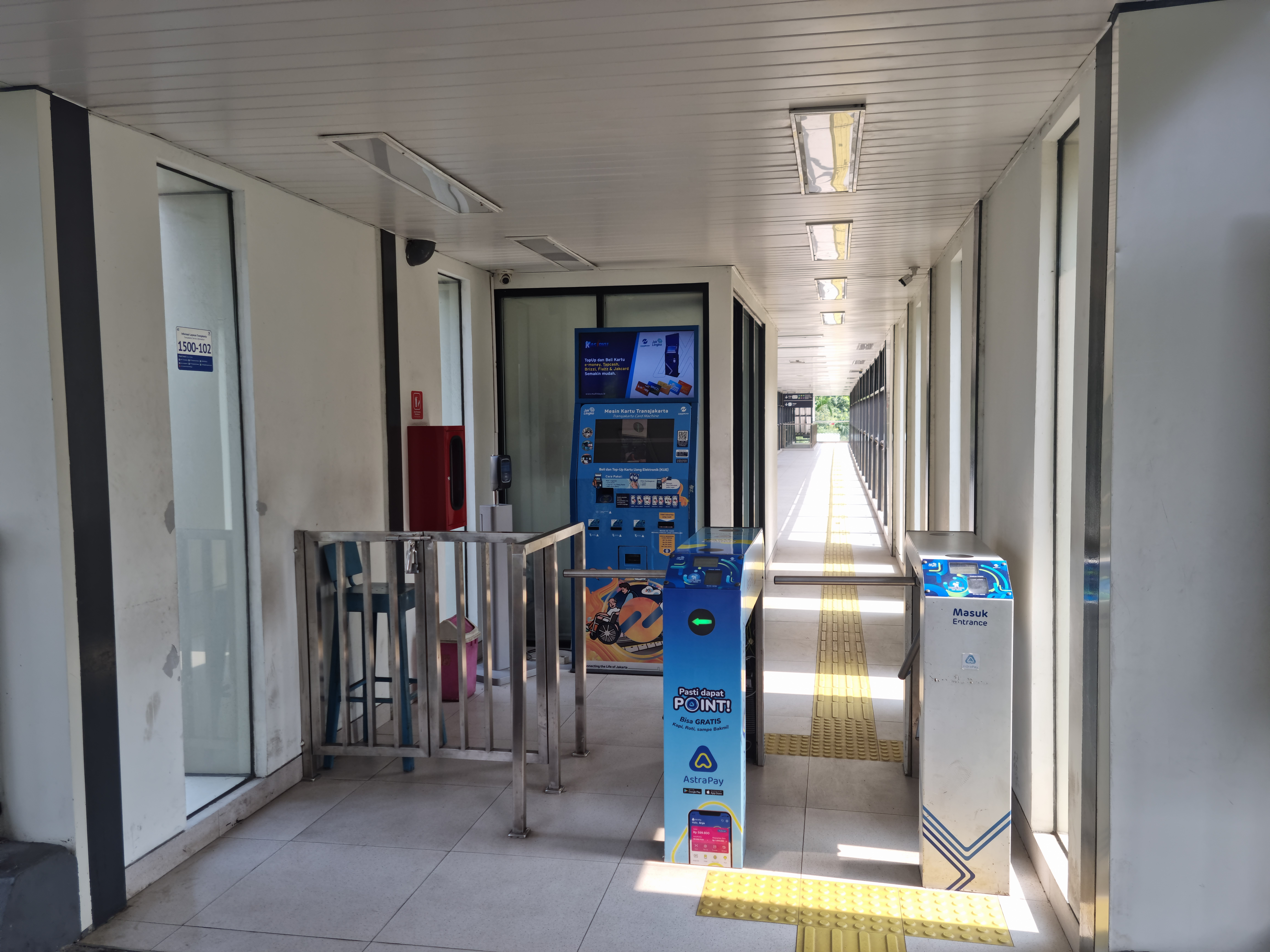
Entrance/exit turnstiles

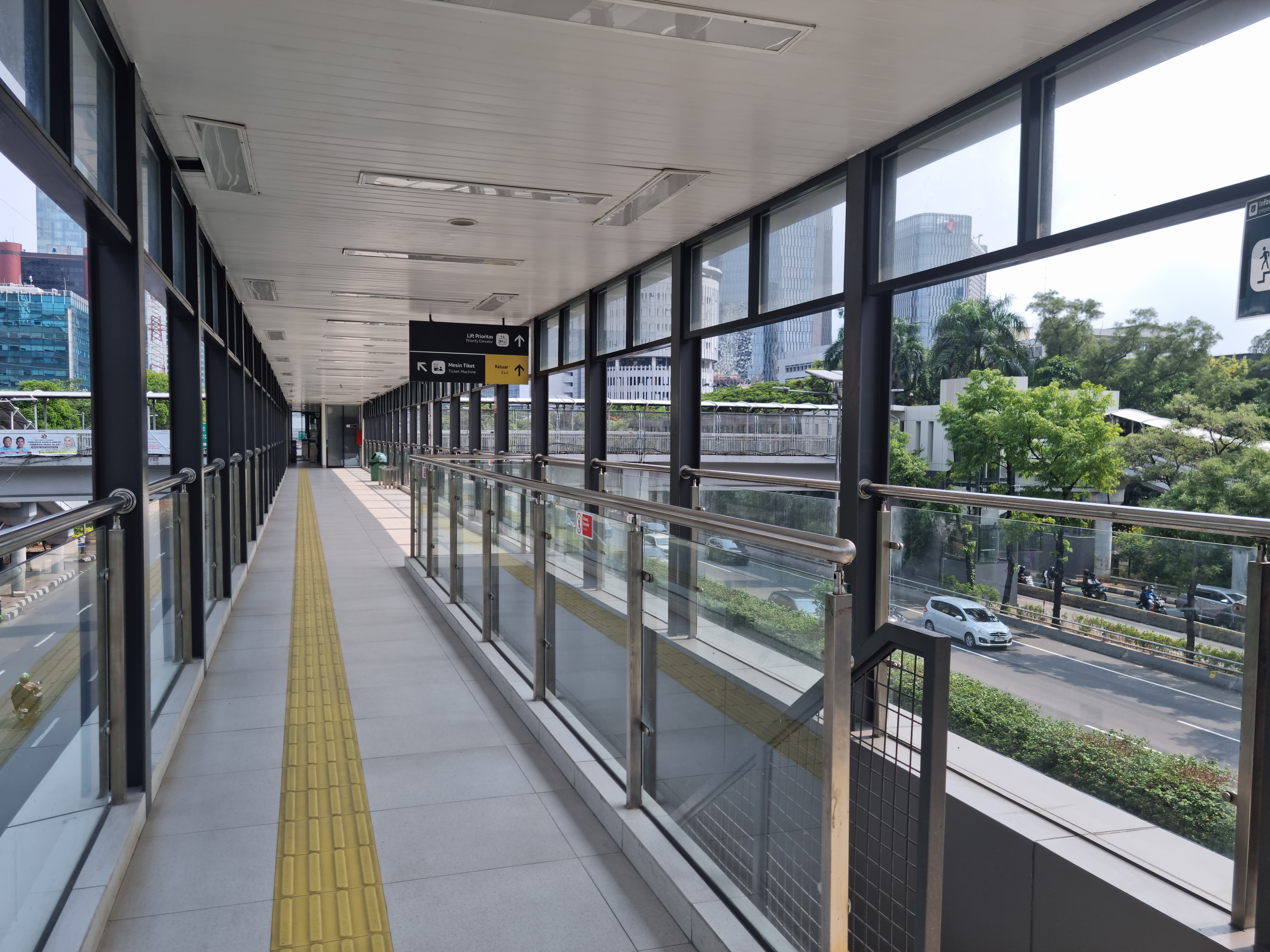
The upper floor of the northwest building

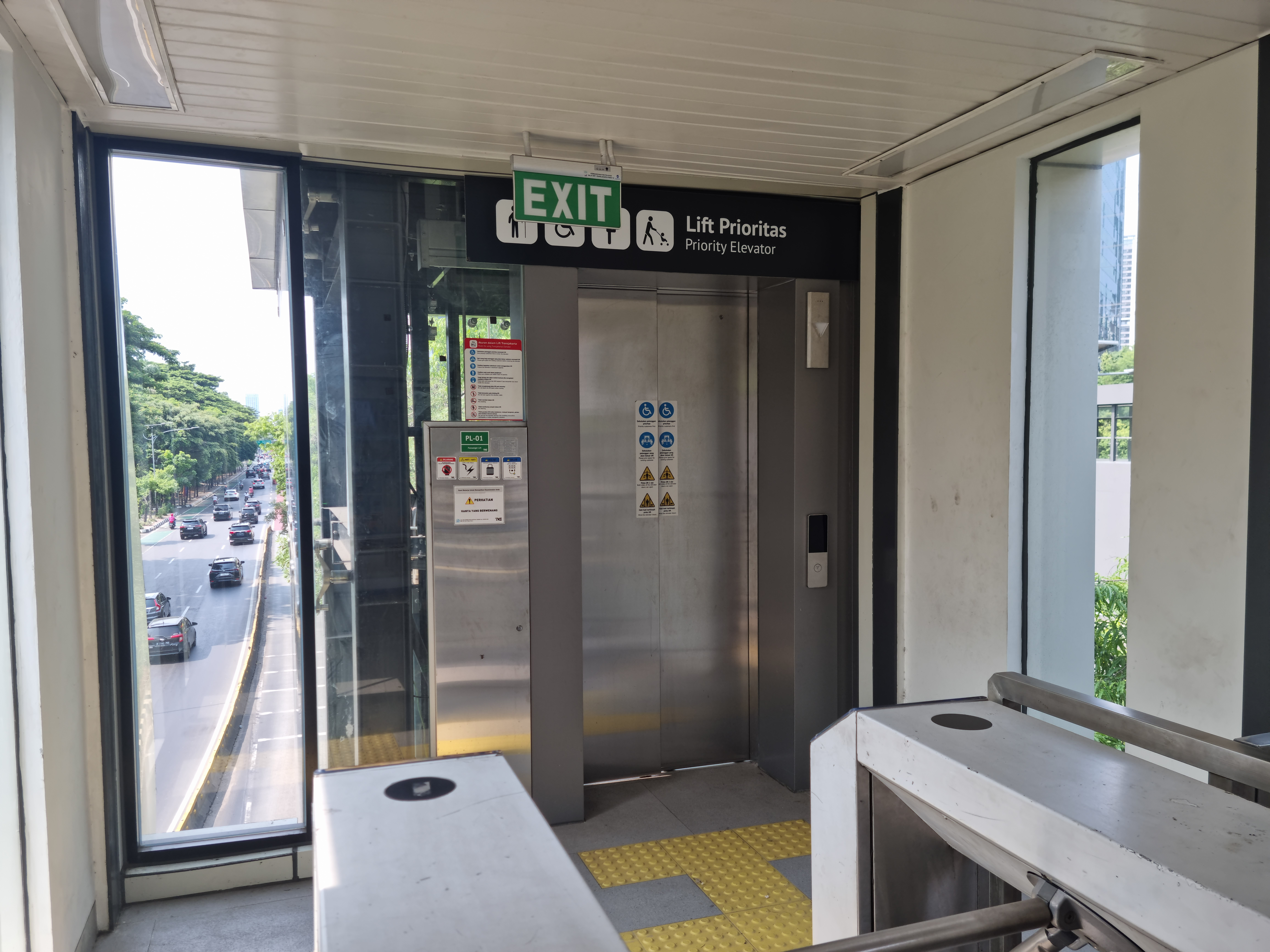
An elevator inside the southeast building

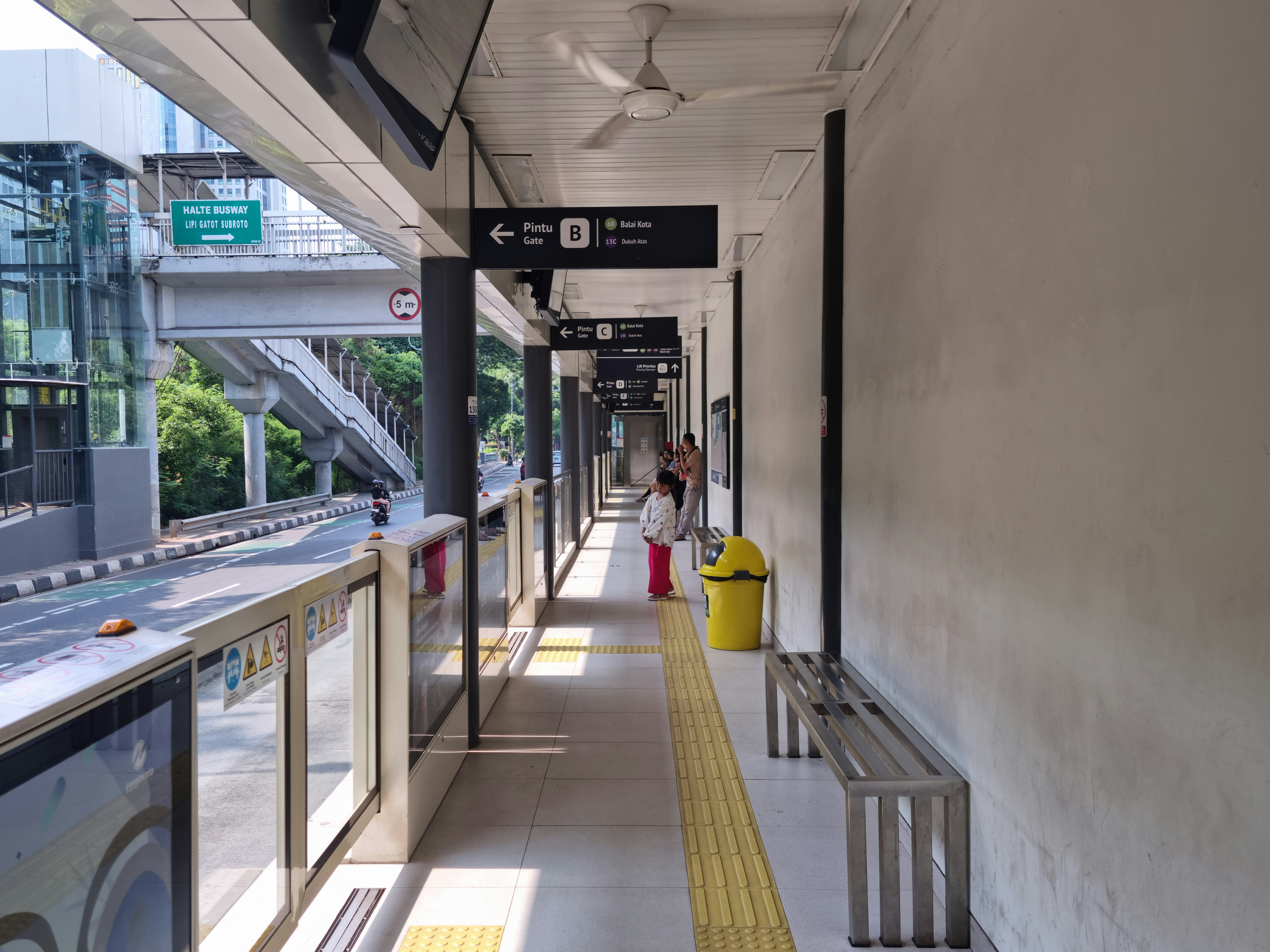
Platform of the southeast building

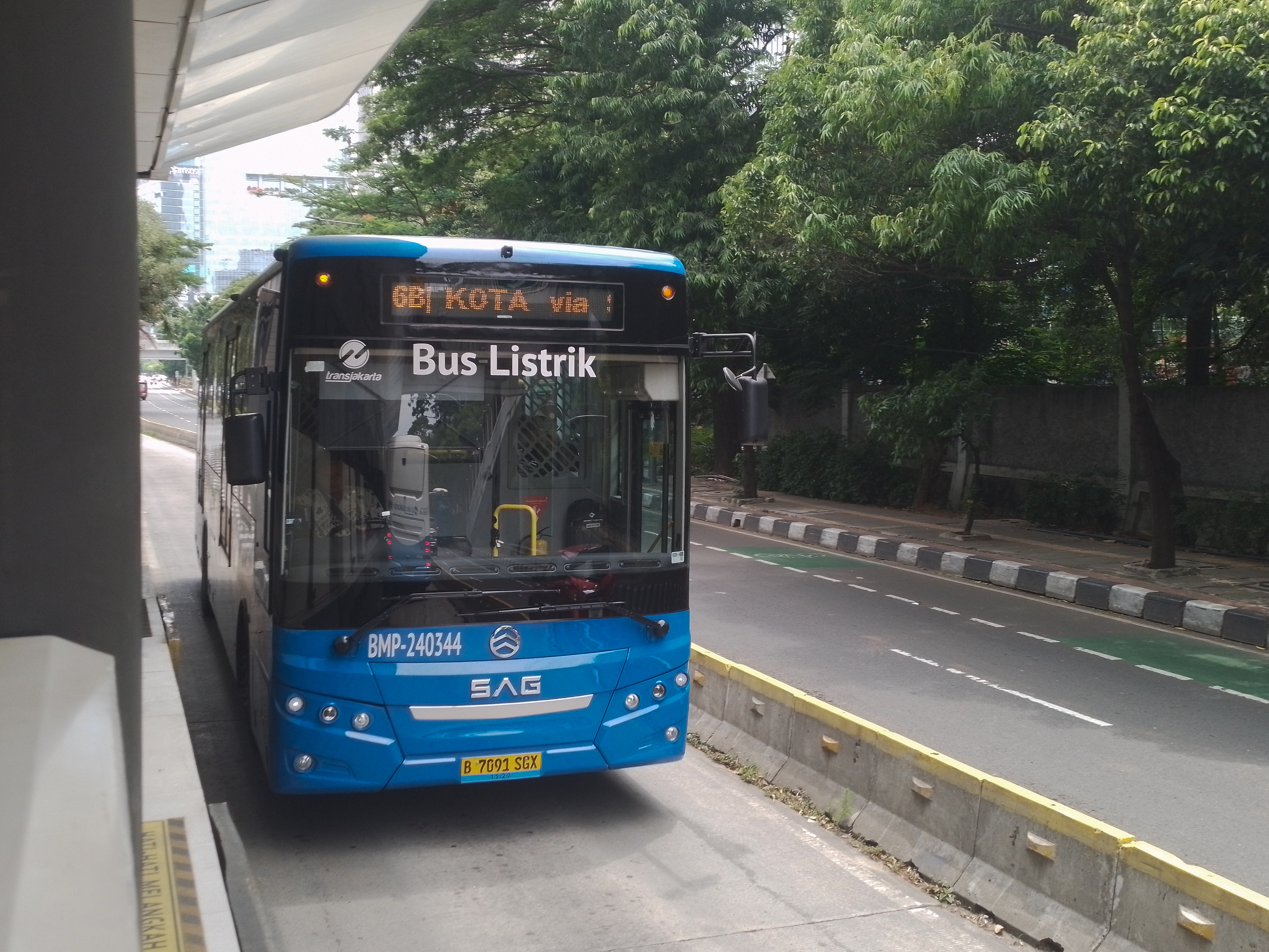
The westbound bus entering the southeast building
