= Mangga Besar (Transjakarta) =

Bus station in Jakarta, Indonesia

1 17 Mangga Besar
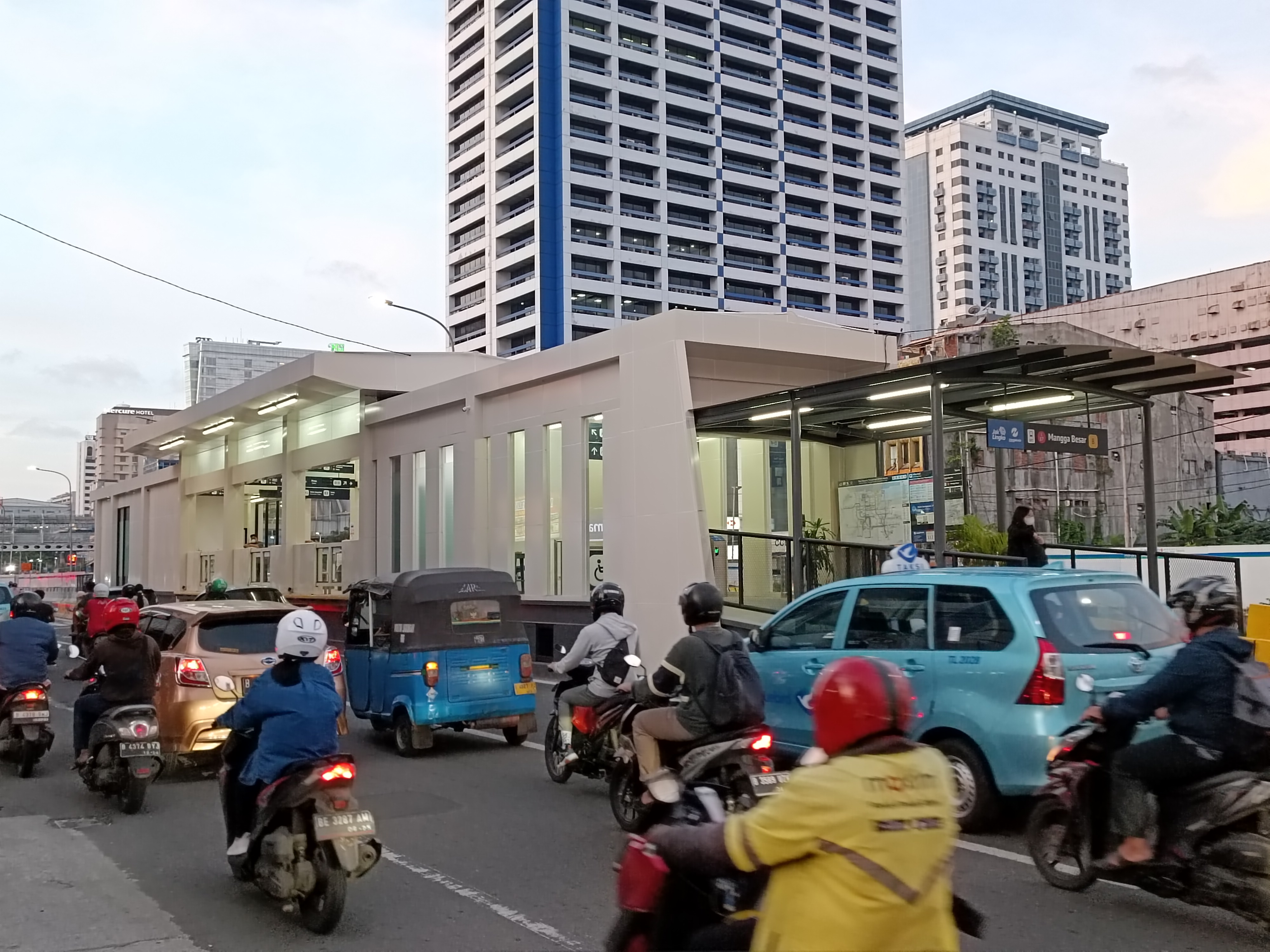
- West temporary building, 2023

General information
- Location: Gajah Mada Road and Hayam Wuruk Road, Kebon Kelapa, Gambir, Central Jakarta 10120, Jakarta, Indonesia
- System: Transjakarta bus rapid transit station
- Owner: Transjakarta
- Operator: Transjakarta
- Lines: List of Transjakarta corridors#Corridor 1 List of Transjakarta corridors#Cross-corridor routes
- Platforms: Two island platforms with separate paid area per platform (one in service, one unused)

Construction
- Structure type: At-grade
- Cycle facilities: No

Other information
- Status: In service with temporary building

History
- Opened: 15 January 2004 (soft launch); 1 February 2004 (commercial operational)
- Closed: 4 March 2023 (original building)

Services
Preceding		Following
Sawah Besar towards Blok M	Corridor 1	Taman Sari towards Kali Besar
Sawah Besar towards Damai	Corridor 3 Route 3H	Taman Sari towards Kota
Location

Mangga Besar is a Transjakarta bus rapid transit station located at Gajah Mada and Hayam Wuruk Roads in Maphar, Taman Sari, West Jakarta, Indonesia, serving Corridor 1. Despite its name, it is not located in the Mangga Besar sub-district (kelurahan), but instead on the border between the Maphar and Krukut sub-districts.

On 25 February 2023, the station was moved to a temporary structure as a result of the construction of the Jakarta MRT Phase 2A.

== Building and layout ==
Mangga Besar BRT station is currently operating with two separated temporary island platform buildings, as well as Harmoni and Sawah Besar. The west building at Jalan Gajah Mada serves northbound buses, while the east on Jalan Hayam Wuruk serves southbound buses. Since 26 August 2023, the west building now serves both direction as the east one was deactivated due to a traffic diversion to support the MRT construction.

West temporary building	towards Kota	(Taman Sari) →
West temporary building	Island platform, the platform doors are opened on the right side of the direction of travel
West temporary building	← (Sawah Besar)	towards Blok M and towards Damai
Ciliwung River
East temporary building
East temporary building	Inactive island platform

== Non-BRT bus services ==
Type	Route	Destination	Notes
Transjakarta Non-BRT		Pantai Maju Promenade—Balai Kota	Inside the station
