= Taman Sari (Transjakarta) =

Bus rapid transit station in Jakarta, Indonesia

1 18 Taman Sari
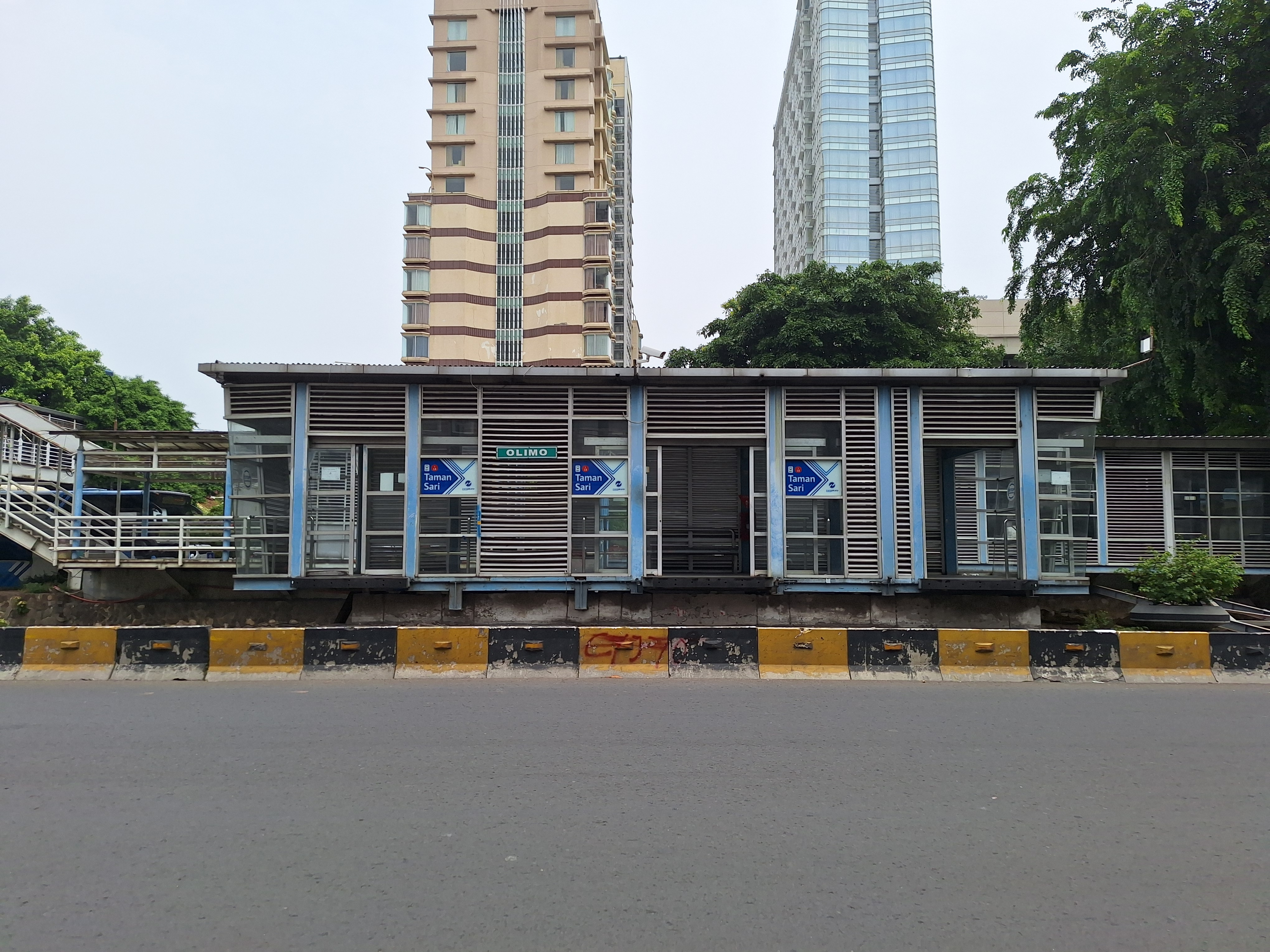
- Exterior of the west platform building, 2024

General information
- Location: Gajah Mada Road and Hayam Wuruk Road, Mangga Besar, Taman Sari, West Jakarta 10120, Jakarta, Indonesia
- System: Transjakarta bus rapid transit station
- Owner: Transjakarta
- Operator: Transjakarta
- Lines: List of Transjakarta corridors#Corridor 1 List of Transjakarta corridors#Cross-corridor routes
- Platforms: Two side platforms connected with a linkway

Construction
- Structure type: At-grade
- Cycle facilities: No
- Accessible: No

Other information
- Status: In service

History
- Opened: 15 January 2004 (soft launch); 1 February 2004 (commercial operational)
- Former names: Olimo

Services
Preceding		Following
Mangga Besar towards Blok M	Corridor 1	Glodok towards Kali Besar
Mangga Besar towards Damai	Corridor 3 Route 3H	Glodok towards Kota
Location

Taman Sari (formerly Olimo) is a Transjakarta bus rapid transit station located in Mangga Besar, Taman Sari, West Jakarta, Indonesia. serving Corridor 1. It is one of the few stations on the line that has not been revitalised or rebuilt since its opening.

Taman Sari station was closed on 31 October 2022 for light renovation works. It reopened on 14 March 2023.

== Naming ==
Taman Sari was originally named Olimo, after N.V. Olimo (later PT. Olimo), an automobile goods company that imported accessories, spare parts, lubricants, body paints, and varnishes during the Dutch colonial period. Olimo was founded in 1914 and had branch offices in Bandung, Surabaya, and Medan. Its former headquarters, demolished in the 1990s, was located at the intersection of Hayam Wuruk Road and Mangga Dua Street. Olimo has become a popular name for the region surrounding the BRT station.

In late December 2023, the Olimo BRT station was renamed Taman Sari, after the district (kecamatan) of the same name where the station is located, alongside 108 other stations across Jakarta. It was part of Transjakarta's "neutralisation" of station names from third-party names (e.g., corporates, not from a naming rights deal, government institutions, or figures) that would allow those stations to grant an official naming right, despite Olimo having been defunct a long time ago.

== Station layout ==
West	towards Kota (Glodok) →
Side platform, doors open on the right-hand side
Batang Hari River
Side platform, doors open on the right-hand side
East	← (Mangga Besar)	towards Blok M and towards Damai

== Non-BRT bus services ==
Jenis	Route	Destination	Notes
Transjakarta Non-BRT		Pantai Maju—Balai Kota	Inside the station

== Incidents ==
On 26 January 2020, a female Transjakarta passenger was attacked by an unknown assailant while descending the pedestrian bridge stairs after exiting the then-named Olimo BRT station. As a result, the victim was rushed to the hospital with a deep and long cut to the back of her head.

On 1 April 2024, the main road near the Taman Sari station collapsed, narrowing the lane to the point where no more than one car could pass at a time. The damage halted Transjakarta services from Harmoni to the Glodok BRT station and required diversions. The Jakarta MRT denied that the damage was caused by the MRT Phase 2 construction project; it was actually due to a utility relocation project by another company.

== Gallery ==
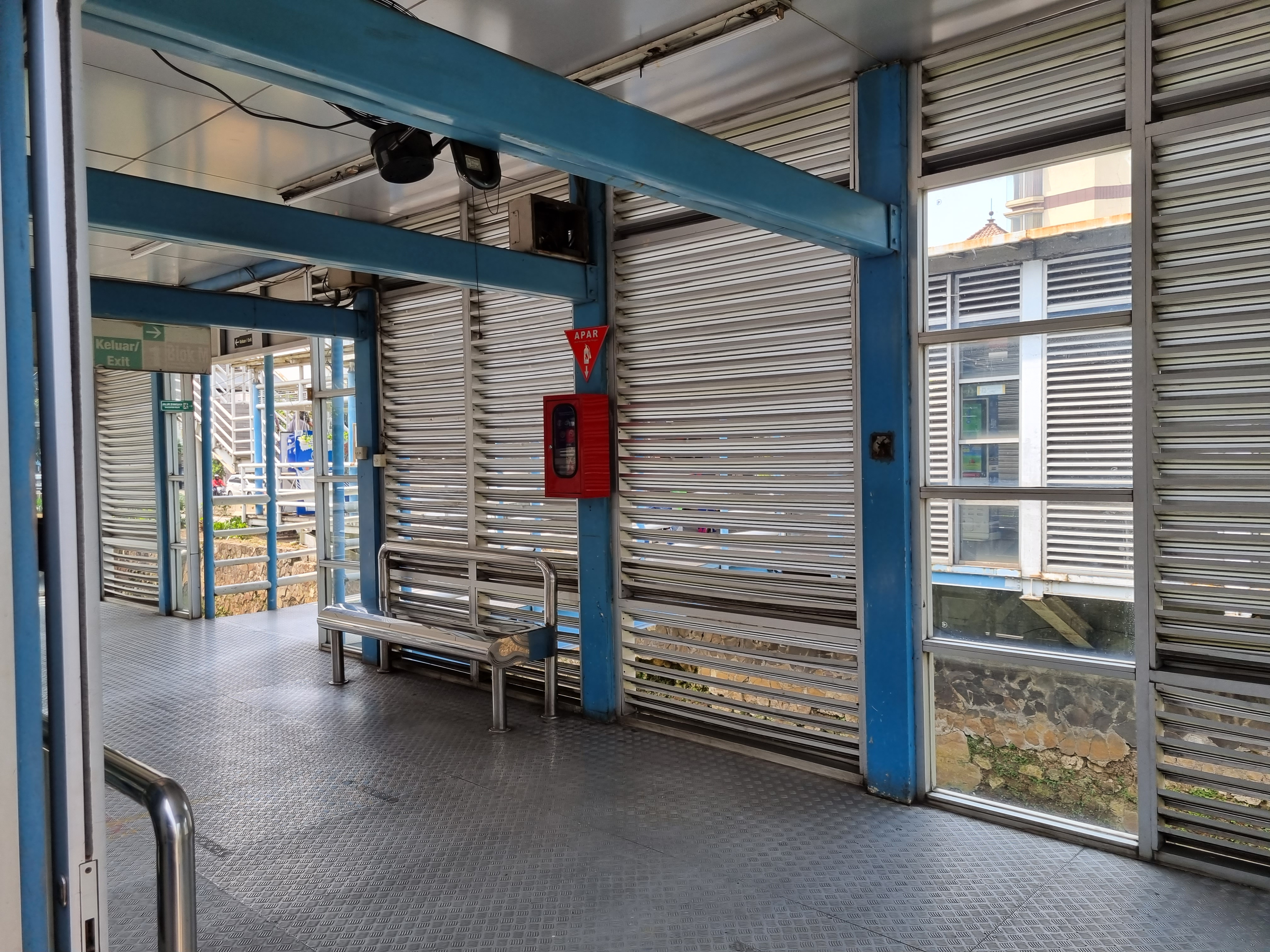
Interior of the west building for northbound buses, 2022

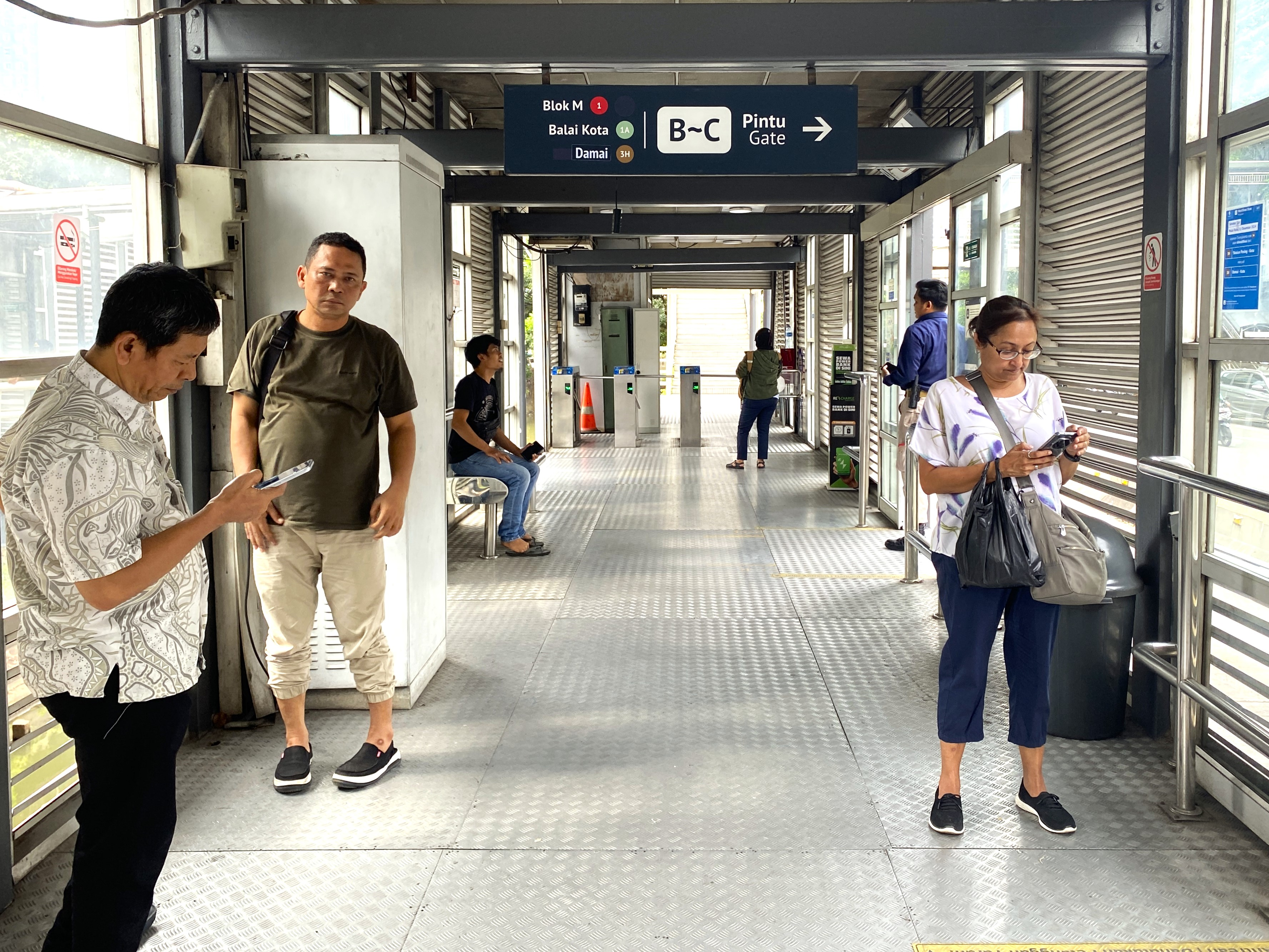
Interior of the east building for southbound buses, 2024

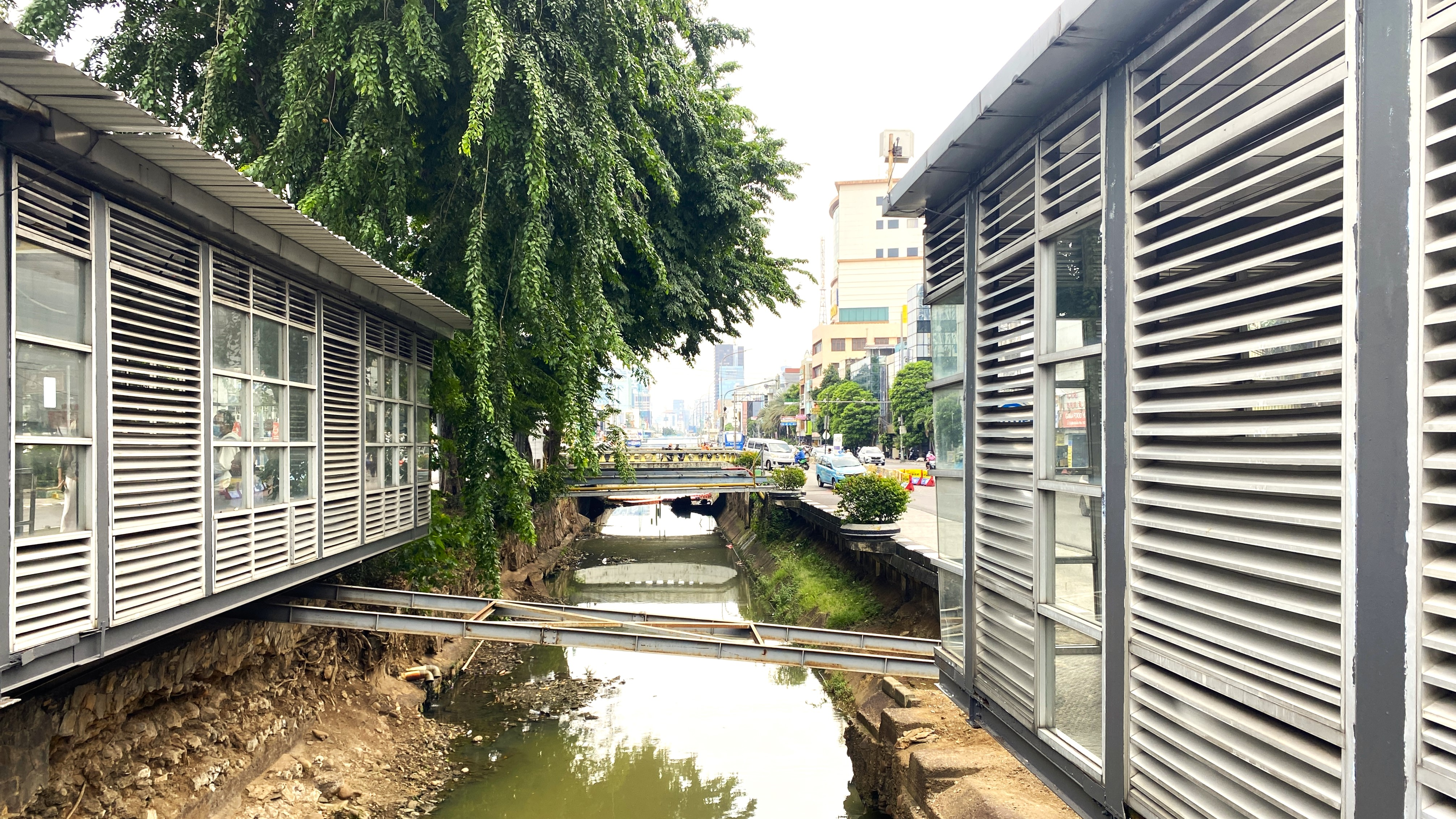
A canal that splits the east and west platform buildings, seen from the link bridge above it, 2024

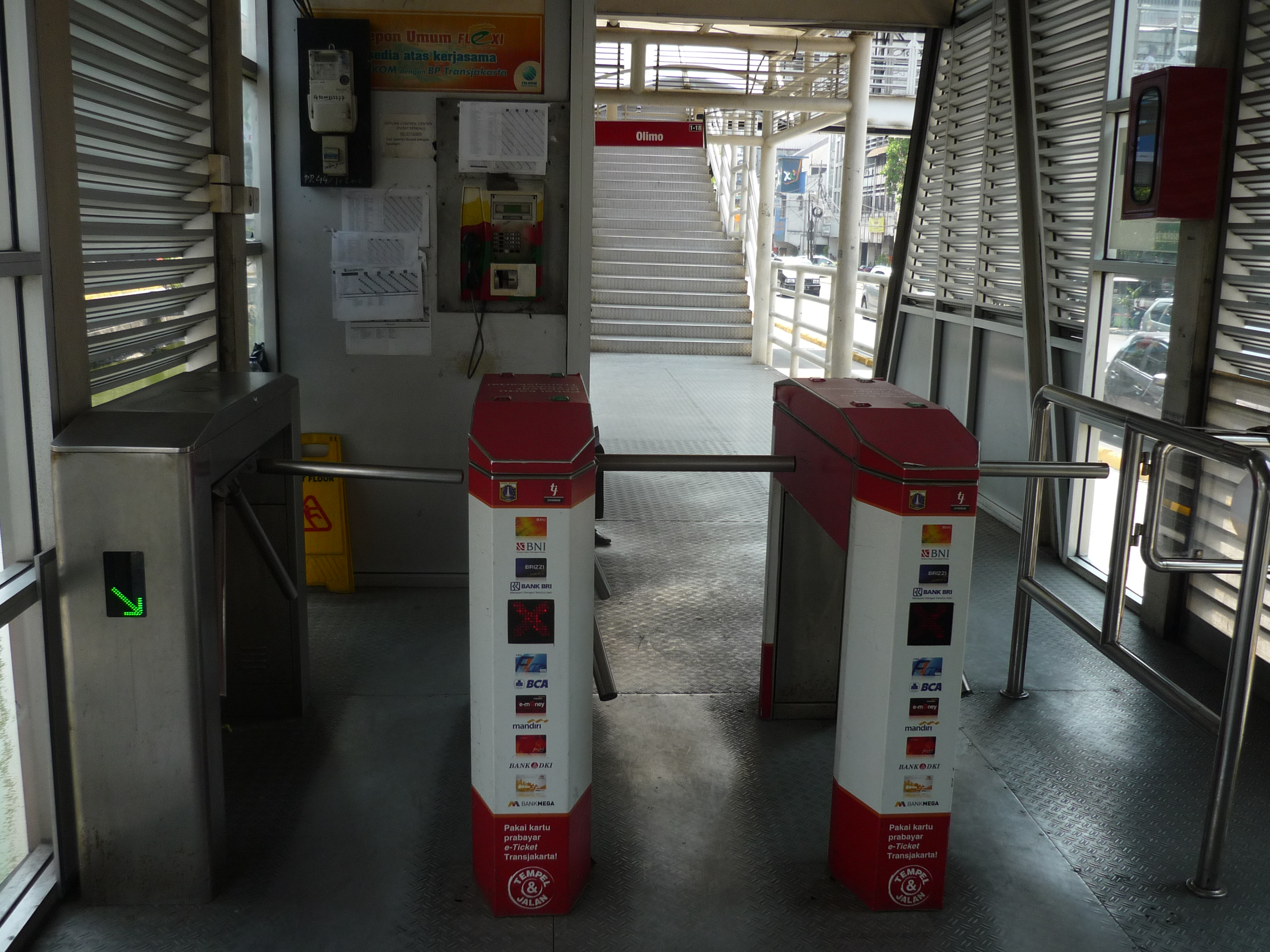
Faregates at the entrance, 2015
