= Glodok (Transjakarta) =

Bus rapid transit station in Jakarta, Indonesia

1 19 Glodok
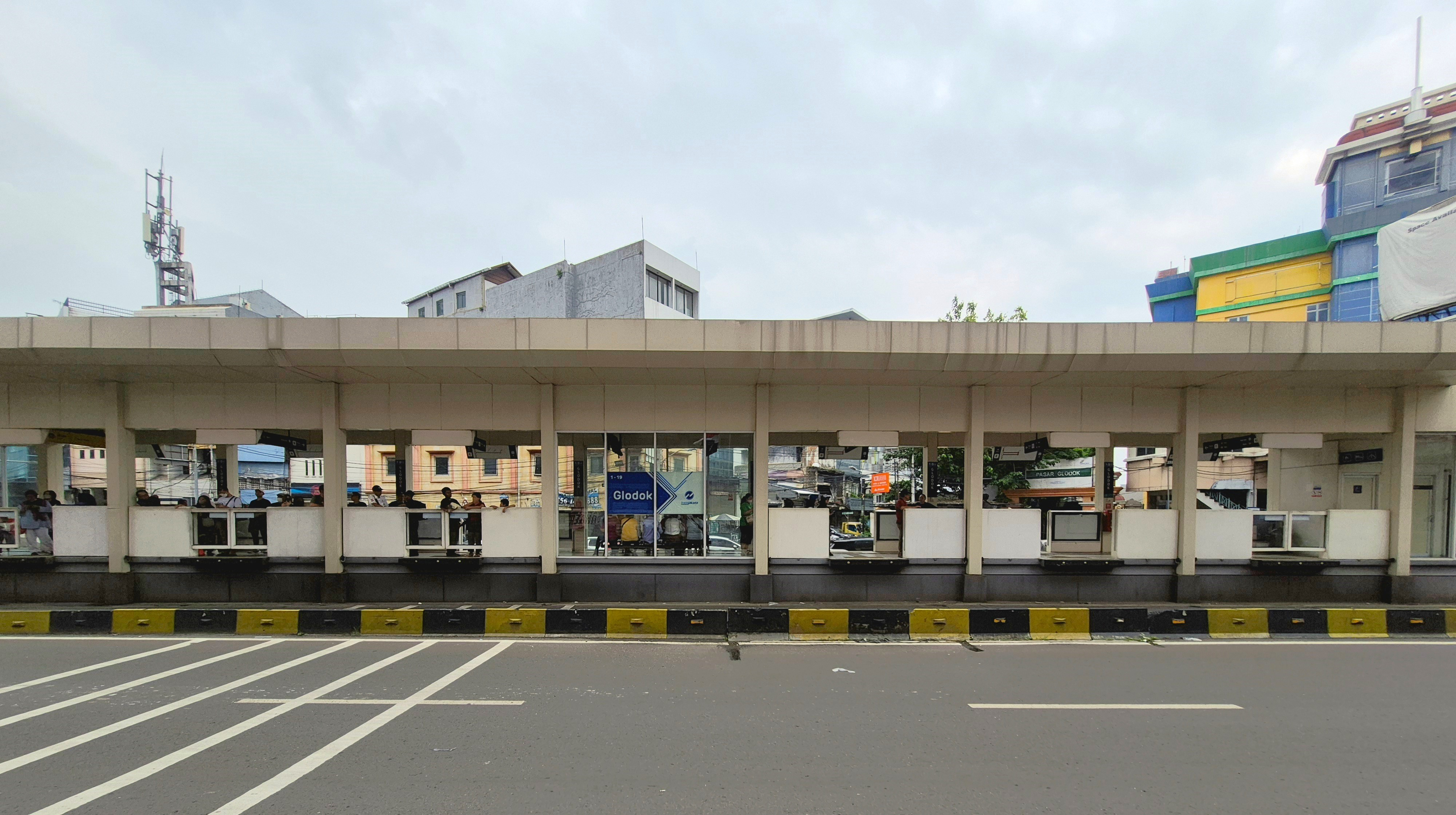
- The station viewed from the side, 2025

General information
- Location: Gajah Mada Road and Hayam Wuruk Road, Kebon Kelapa, Gambir, Central Jakarta 10120, Jakarta, Indonesia
- System: Transjakarta bus rapid transit station
- Owner: Transjakarta
- Operator: Transjakarta
- Lines: List of Transjakarta corridors#Corridor 1 List of Transjakarta corridors#Cross-corridor routes
- Platforms: Single island platform

Construction
- Structure type: At-grade
- Cycle facilities: No

Other information
- Status: In service

History
- Opened: 15 January 2004 (soft launch); 1 February 2004 (commercial operational)
- Rebuilt: 15 January 2022

Services
Preceding		Following
Taman Sari One-way operation	Corridor 1	Kali Besar Terminus
Taman Sari towards Blok M	Corridor 1	Kota One-way operation
Taman Sari One-way operation	Corridor 3 Route 3H	Kali Besar towards Kota
Taman Sari towards Damai	Corridor 3 Route 3H	Kota One-way operation
Location

Glodok is a Transjakarta bus rapid transit station located in Mangga Besar, Taman Sari, West Jakarta, Indonesia, serving Corridor 1. It is located nearby Glodok, the oldest Chinatown in Jakarta and also an administrative village (kelurahan) within Taman Sari.

== Building and layout ==
The Glodok BRT station has been operating with a temporary structure since 15 January 2022. It is located in front of Harco Glodok, approximately 100 metres (110 yd) from the original structure, which was demolished for the ongoing Jakarta MRT construction. The temporary structure also features supporting facilities such as automated ticket machines, restrooms, a prayer room (musala, already exists in the original building), and a lactation room. Unlike the original building, which used a bridge, the current building utilises a pelican crossing for access.

North	towards Kota (Kali Besar) →
Island platform, the platform doors are opened on the right side of the direction of travel
South	← (Taman Sari) towards Blok M and towards Damai

== Non-BRT bus services ==
Type	Route	Destination	Notes
Transjakarta Non-BRT		Pantai Maju—Balai Kota	Inside the station

== Places nearby ==
- Glodok Chinatown
  - Petak Sembilan Market Complex
  - Candra Naya
  - Fat Cu Kung Temple
  - Tanda Bhakti Temple
  - Santa Maria de Fatima Catholic Church
  - Dharma Bhakti Kim Tek Ie Temple
  - Toa Se Bio Temple

== Gallery ==
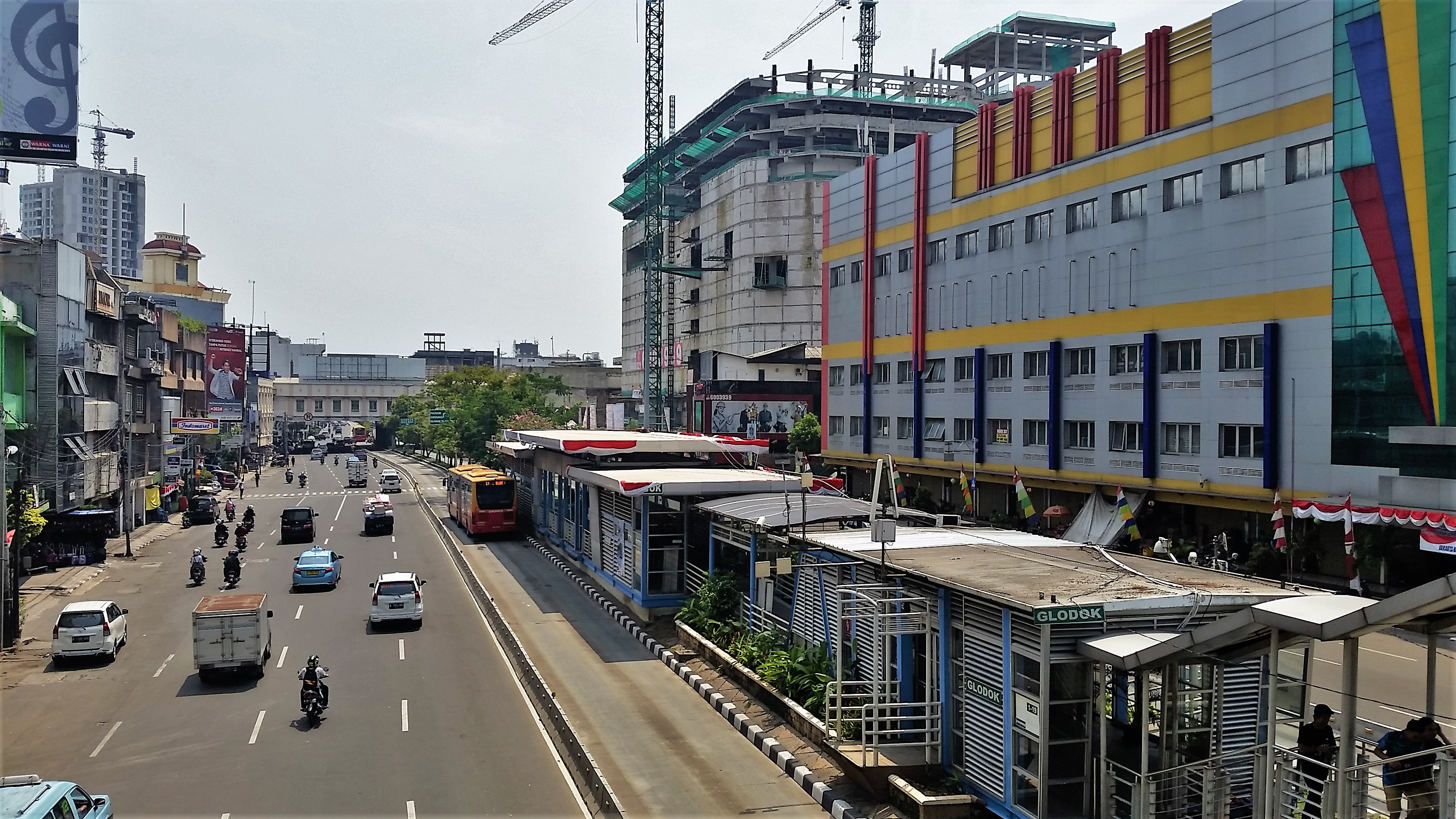
The original station building, 2016

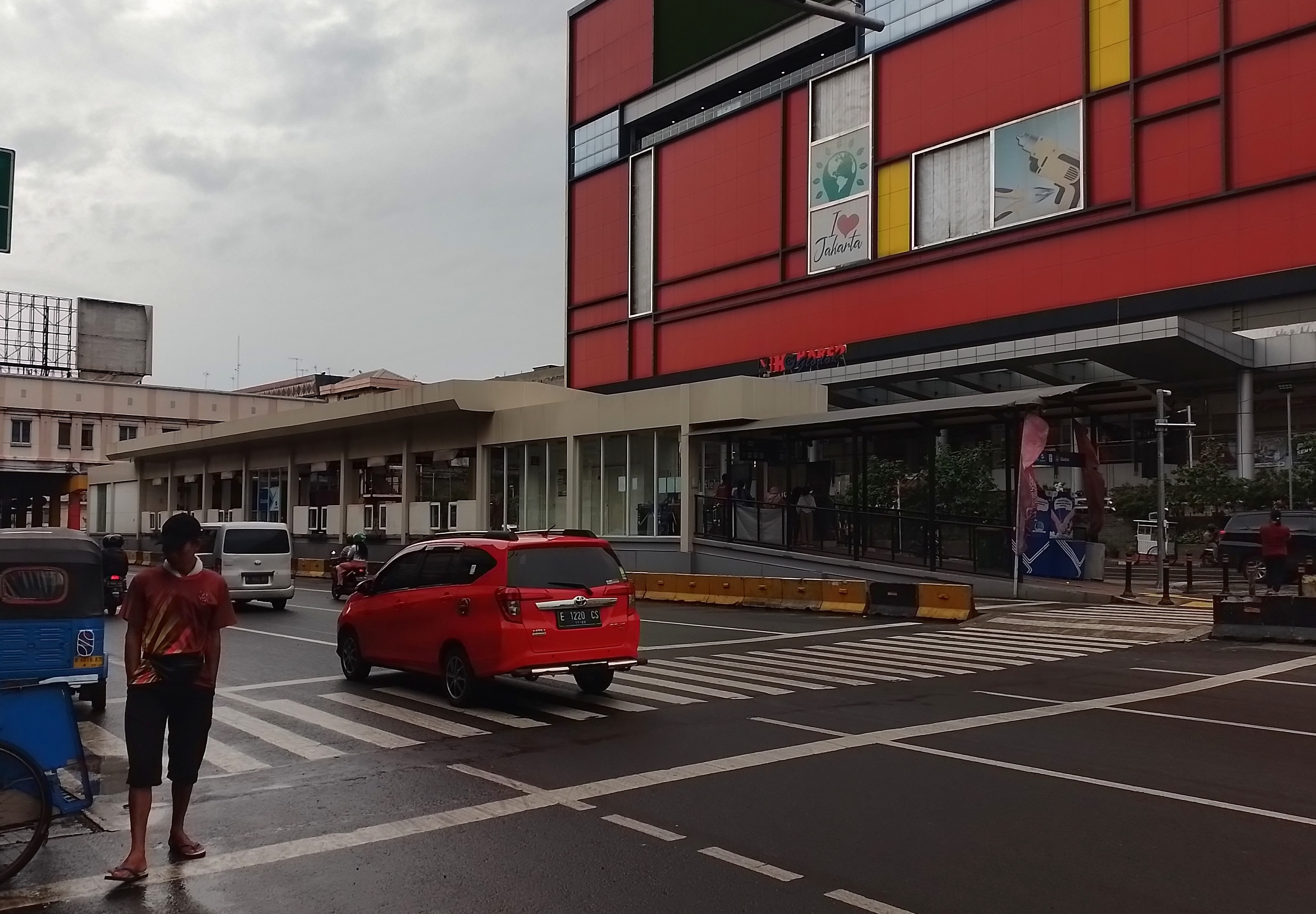
Pelican crossing to access the station, 2022

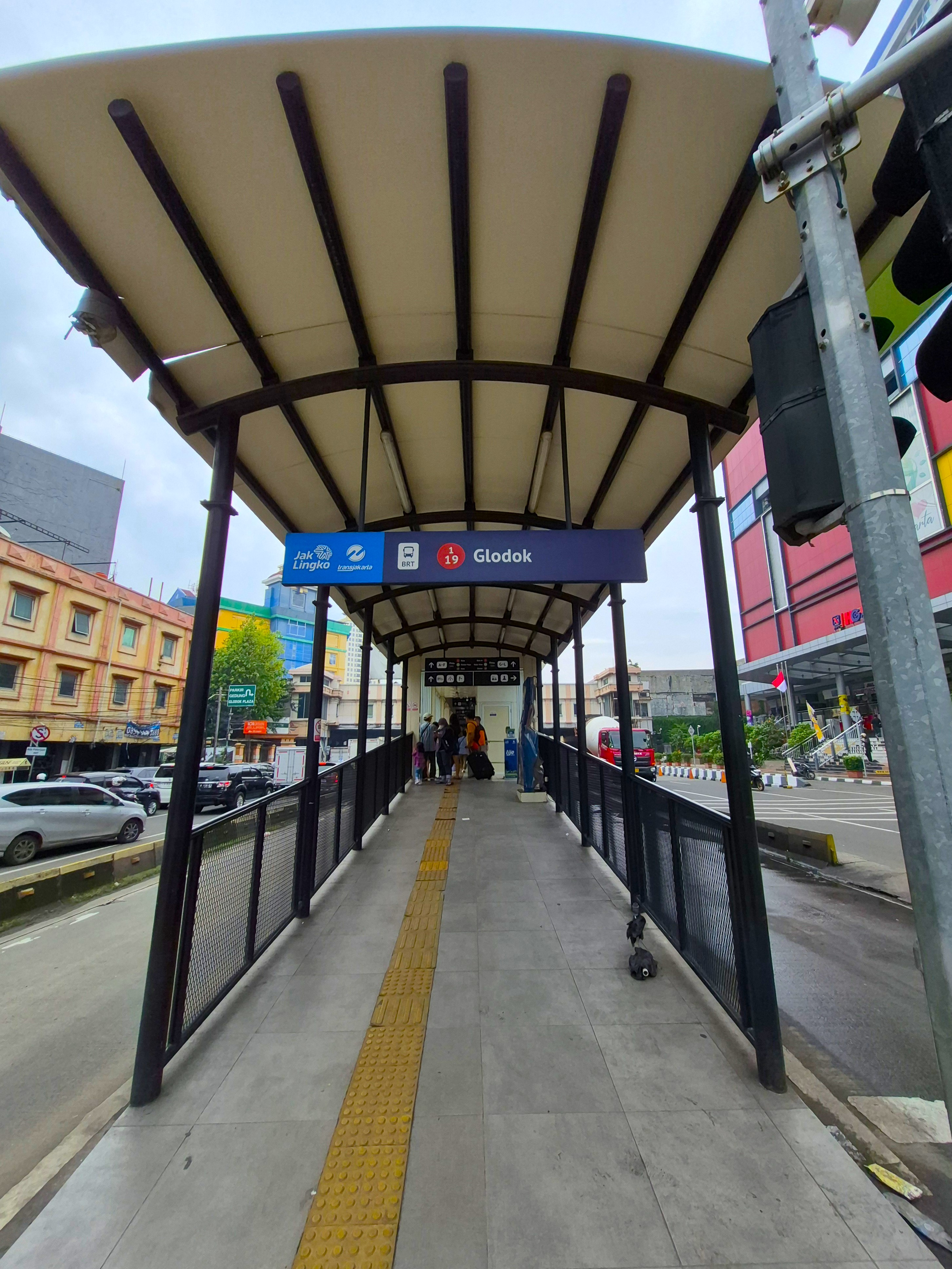
Entrance of the station, 2025

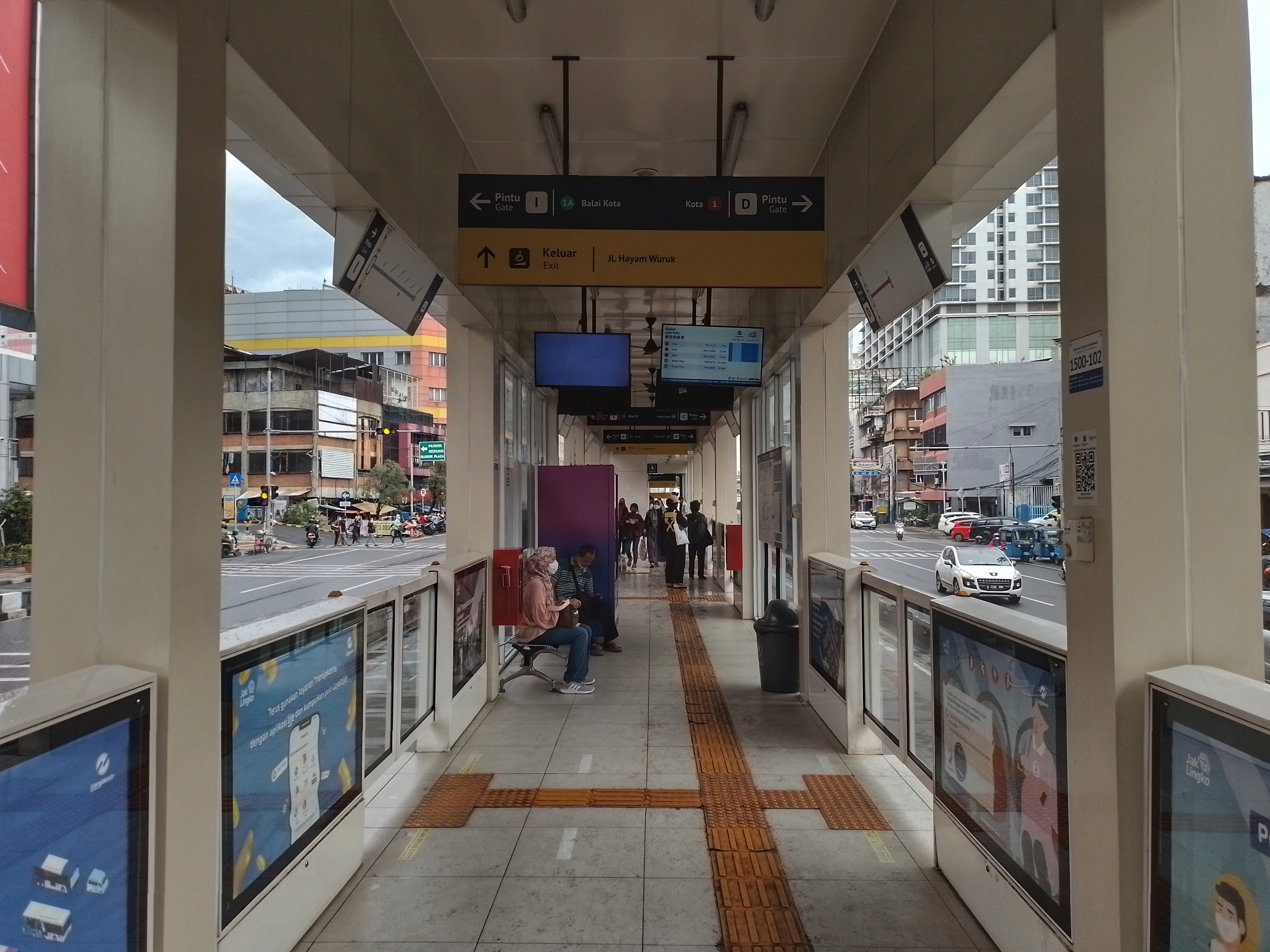
Interior of the temporary station, 2022
