= Transjakarta Corridor 1 =

Bus rapid transit route in Indonesia

- Blok M – Kali Besar
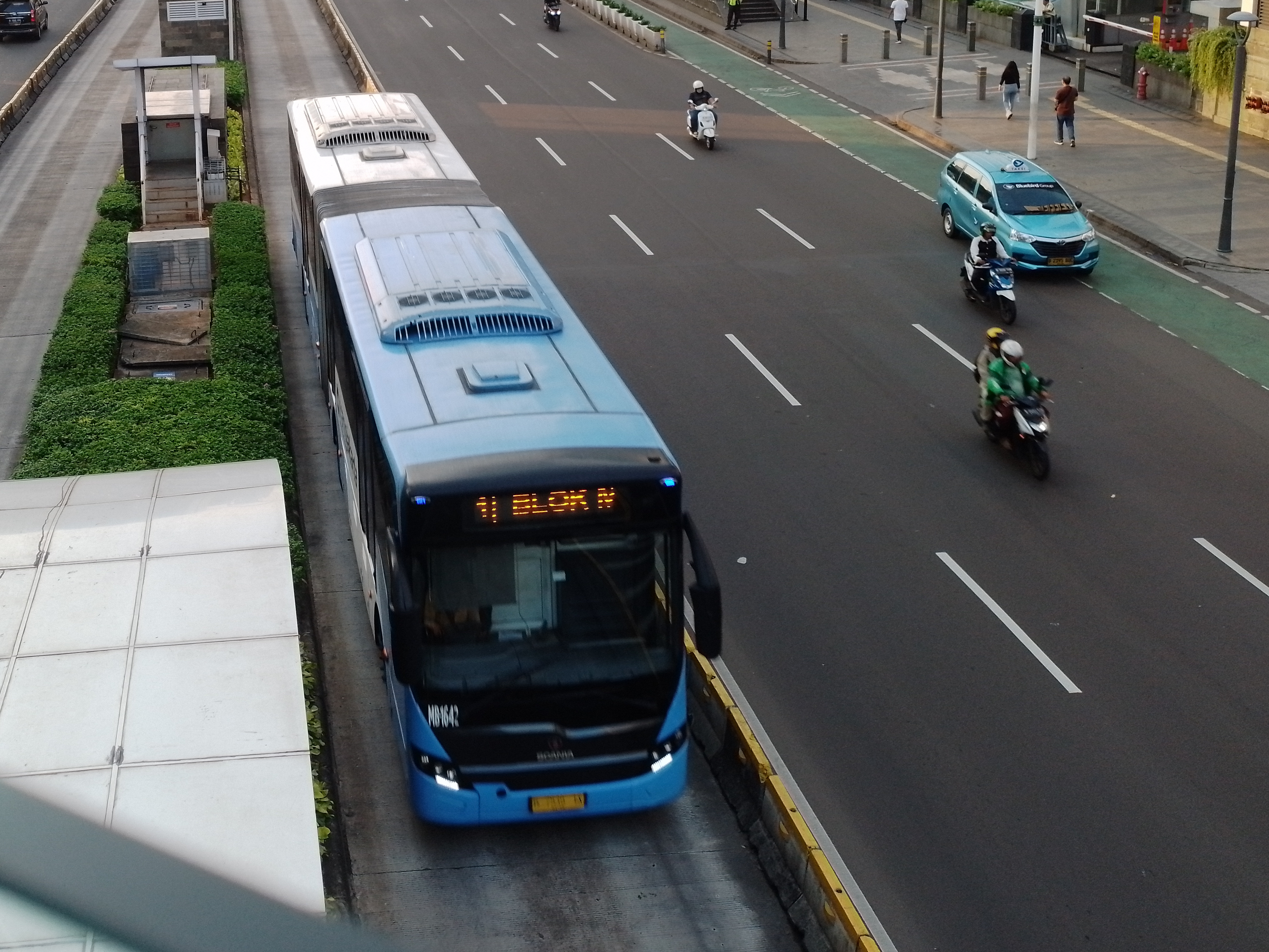
- The Scania articulated bus fleet that serves Corridor 1 entering Bundaran HI Astra BRT station.

Overview
- System: Transjakarta
- Operator: PT. Transportasi Jakarta (TJ, fleets and bus stops); Steady Safe (SAF, fleet); Perum DAMRI (DMR, fleet); Bianglala Metropolitan (BMP, fleet); Mayasari Bakti (MB/MYS, fleet)
- Began service: 15 January 2004 (soft launching); 1 February 2004 (commercial operation)

Route
- Route type: Street-level Bus Rapid Transit
- Locale: West Jakarta; Central Jakarta; South Jakarta
- Length: 15.48 km
- Stations: 23

The Transjakarta Corridor 1 is a Transjakarta bus rapid transit route in Jakarta, Indonesia. The route operates between Blok M Bus Terminal and Kali Besar BRT station in Kota Tua Jakarta. It is the first route of the Transjakarta BRT system.

The roads traversed by Corridor 1 include Sultan Hasanuddin Ave, Trunojoyo Rd, Sisingamangaraja Ave, Sudirman Blvd, MH Thamrin Blvd, Medan Merdeka Barat Blvd, Veteran Rd, Gajah Mada/Hayam Wuruk Ave, Kali Besar Timur St, Pintu Besar Utara St, Kali Besar Barat St, Kunir St, and Lada Dalam St.

Key interchange points along Corridor 1 include Dukuh Atas TOD, which serves four transport modes; Jakarta Kota railway station, which serves KRL Commuterline; and Harmoni station, one of the main hubs in the BRT system. Between Blok M to Bundaran HI Astra, this corridor runs parallel to the North–South Line of the Jakarta MRT; thus, many of the BRT stations are directly integrated or within walking distance from the MRT stations. Currently, all bus stations are served by buses 24 hours a day.

== History ==
=== Background ===
The idea of implementing the bus rapid transit system in Jakarta was conceived in 2001 by the Governor of Jakarta at the time, Sutiyoso. The idea was supported by the Institute for Transportation & Development Policy (ITDP), the United States Agency for International Development (USAID), and other parties.

Corridor 1's route, from Blok M Terminal to Jakarta Kota station, was planned to pass through Sudirman Blvd and M.H. Thamrin Blvd. These roads are the main arteries in Jakarta's central economic and governmental hub, known as the Golden Triangle. The route was chosen to address traffic congestion when efforts to build a subway system, proposed by B. J. Habibie in 1985 and then by Sutiyoso in 1998, could not be realised.

=== Corridor construction ===
The construction of Corridor 1 commenced in mid-2003, marked by the installation of "KHUSUS BUSWAY (BUS LANE)" signs on pedestrian bridges and red markings denoting the dedicated bus lane. Construction of new bus stations and exclusive lanes began in late 2003, and was accompanied by a public awareness campaign. However, the construction disrupted heavy traffic on Sudirman Blvd and M.H. Thamrin Blvd during peak hours, prompting numerous public complaints.

=== Early operations ===
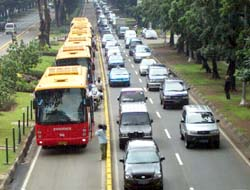
Transjakarta bus fleets at Sudirman Blvd, c. 2004-2006

On 15 January 2004, during a heavy donwpour, Governor Sutiyoso inaugurated Corridor 1 at Gelora Bung Karno BRT station (now Senayan Bank Jakarta).

With the availability of the Transjakarta Busway as a fast, safe, comfortable, on-time, and affordable public transportation option, it is hoped that this will be an alternative for all parties, especially for those who use personal cars.

— Sutiyoso's speech after inaugurating Corridor 1 at the Jakarta City Hall (in Indonesian)

The inauguration of Corridor 1 sparked strong enthusiasm among Jakarta residents, as shown by overcrowding at Kota and Gelora Bung Karno stations and on bus fleets. Despite a positive reception, transportation expert Darmaningtyas criticised Corridor 1's operation six days earlier.

There is no integral concept regarding the Busway in Jakarta. So the concept of the Busway was raised, but it was not accompanied by an integral concept that included feeder services, pedestrian facilities, and special lanes for non-motorised vehicles (e.g., bicycles).

— Transportation expert Darmaningtyas (in Indonesian)

=== Further developments ===
- In 2009, the Monas (now Monumen Nasional) station, which had a small building form, was expanded to accommodate Corridors 1 and 2 passengers.
- On 23 January 2012, 102 articulated buses with a higher passenger capacity began operating to accommodate the high passenger density.
- In 2014, due to the construction of Jakarta MRT Phase 1, several BRT stations along Corridor 1 were either relocated or closed. Masjid Agung, Bundaran Senayan, and Karet, were relocated. Stations that were closed and demolished were Setiabudi (Note: Not to be confused with the station of the same name on Corridor 6, formerly called Setiabudi Utara.) and Bundaran HI (now Bundaran HI Astra). Bundaran HI station was rebuilt after the MRT construction concluded in 2019, but Setiabudi station was not.
- On 1 June 2014, Corridor 1 began 24-hour service, along with Corridors 3 and 9. At the time, the night service only stopped at certain bus stations. Later, all bus stations were served by the night service.
- In late 2018, three pedestrian bridges providing access to the Bundaran Senayan, Gelora Bung Karno, and Polda Metro Jaya stations were revitalised, with completion in March 2019. Following this, the revitalisation of the Karet pedestrian bridge, which provides access to the Karet Sudirman (now Karet) station, was inaugurated in April 2021 and March 2022, respectively.
- On 24 March 2019, coinciding with the inauguration of the MRT, the rebuilt Bundaran HI station became the first BRT station directly linked to an MRT station, although the connecting access was only a flight of stairs with wheelchair access.
- Due to the construction of the MRT Phase 2A, Bank Indonesia (now Kebon Sirih), Harmoni, Sawah Besar, and Mangga Besar stations were relocated to temporary buildings. The temporary building of the Bank Indonesia station began operations on 19 December 2020, Mangga Besar on 25 February 2023, Sawah Besar on 28 February 2023, and Harmoni on 4 March 2023.
- On 15 April 2022, five BRT Stations in Corridor 1, namely Gelora Bung Karno, Tosari, Bundaran HI, Dukuh Atas, and Sarinah (now M.H. Thamrin), were temporarily closed for revitalisation alongside six other stations on Corridors 2, 5, 9, and 11. To serve affected passengers, Transjakarta operated the 1ST (Monumen Nasional–Semanggi) shuttle bus from 15 April to 11 September 2022. The revitalisation aimed to improve service quality and connect the stations with other modes like MRT and KRL. Gelora Bung Karno was the first to reopen on 17 August 2022, followed by Bundaran HI on 6 October 2022, Tosari on 26 December 2022, Dukuh Atas and Sarinah (reopened as M.H. Thamrin) on 4 March 2023.
- On 22 July 2022, Corridor 1 began to serve Kali Besar Barat (now Kali Besar) and Museum Fatahillah (now Museum Sejarah Jakarta) stations of Corridor 12 due to a permanent route diversion that circles the Jakarta History Museum block, passing through Pintu Besar Utara, Kali Besar Barat, Kunir, and Lada Dalam Streets. This route diversion is the result of relocating Kota BRT station from the west entrance of Jakarta Kota railway station to the north entrance. Kali Besar is now officially the terminus of Corridor 1, where some northbound buses terminate and require all passengers to alight.
- On 31 May 2023, the Bundaran Senayan and Karet stations were temporarily closed for revitalisation, following the previous five revitalised stations in 2022. Bundaran Senayan station resumed operation on 31 August 2023, followed by Karet on the next day. Besides that, Bendungan Hilir was closed for revitalisation on 7 October 2023, and reopened on 14 July 2024.

== List of BRT stations ==
- Currently, all stations are served by buses 24 hours a day.
- Stations indicated by a ← sign have a one-way service towards Blok M only. Stations indicated by a → sign have a one-way service towards Kali Besar only.

Corridor 1 (Blok M – Kali Besar)
Code	Station name	Transfer/Notes	Bus terminal, train or MRT station nearby
Stations in order: From top to bottom (downwards) towards Kali Besar (→); from bottom to top (upwards) towards Blok M (←)
1 01	Blok M	Two separate buildings for opposing directions require exiting paid area to transfer: Lane 1 (Part 1): Arrivals only; Lane 1 (Part 2): Towards Kali Besar (→)	Blok M Bus Terminal Blok M BCA
1 02	ASEAN →	ASEAN CSW 1 (via skybridge)	ASEAN
1 02	Towards Kali Besar (→) heads straight to Masjid Agung		
1 02	Towards Blok M (←) heads straight to Blok M		
1 02	Kejaksaan Agung ←	ASEAN (via skybridge) CSW 1 (via skybridge)	ASEAN
1 03	Masjid Agung	Masjid Agung	ASEAN
1 04	Bundaran Senayan	Bundaran Senayan	Senayan Mastercard
1 05	Senayan Bank Jakarta	Senayan Bank Jakarta	
1 06	Polda Metro Jaya		Istora Mandiri
1 07	Bendungan Hilir	Semanggi (via skybridge*)	Bendungan Hilir
1 08	Karet	Karet	
1 09	Dukuh Atas	Dukuh Atas Galunggung (via skybridge)	Sudirman Dukuh Atas BNI BNI City Dukuh Atas BNI
1 10	Tosari	Tosari	Dukuh Atas BNI
1 11	Bundaran HI Astra	Bundaran HI Astra	Bundaran HI Bank Jakarta
1 12	M.H. Thamrin	M.H. Thamrin	Thamrin (U/C)
1 13	Kebon Sirih	Two separate buildings for opposing directions require exiting paid area to transfer: Northbound: Towards Kali Besar (→); Southbound: Towards Blok M (←)	Thamrin (U/C)
1 13	Kebon Sirih	Kebon Sirih	Thamrin (U/C)
1 14 2 21	Monumen Nasional	Monumen Nasional	Monas (U/C)
1 15 2 20	Harmoni	Harmoni	Harmoni (U/C)
1 16	Sawah Besar	Sawah Besar	Sawah Besar (U/C)
1 17	Mangga Besar	Mangga Besar	Mangga Besar (U/C)
1 18	Taman Sari	Taman Sari	
1 19	Glodok	Glodok	Glodok (U/C)
Towards Kali Besar (→) heads straight to Kali Besar
1 20 12 06	Kota ←	Kota	(Kutojaya Utara) Jakarta Kota Kota (U/C)
1 22 12 05	Museum Sejarah Jakarta ←	Museum Sejarah Jakarta	
1 21 12 22	Kali Besar	Kali Besar	

* Semanggi to Bendungan Hilir BRT station via skywalk bridge which may be too steep for disabled persons and takes at least a 10 minute walk.

== Fleets ==
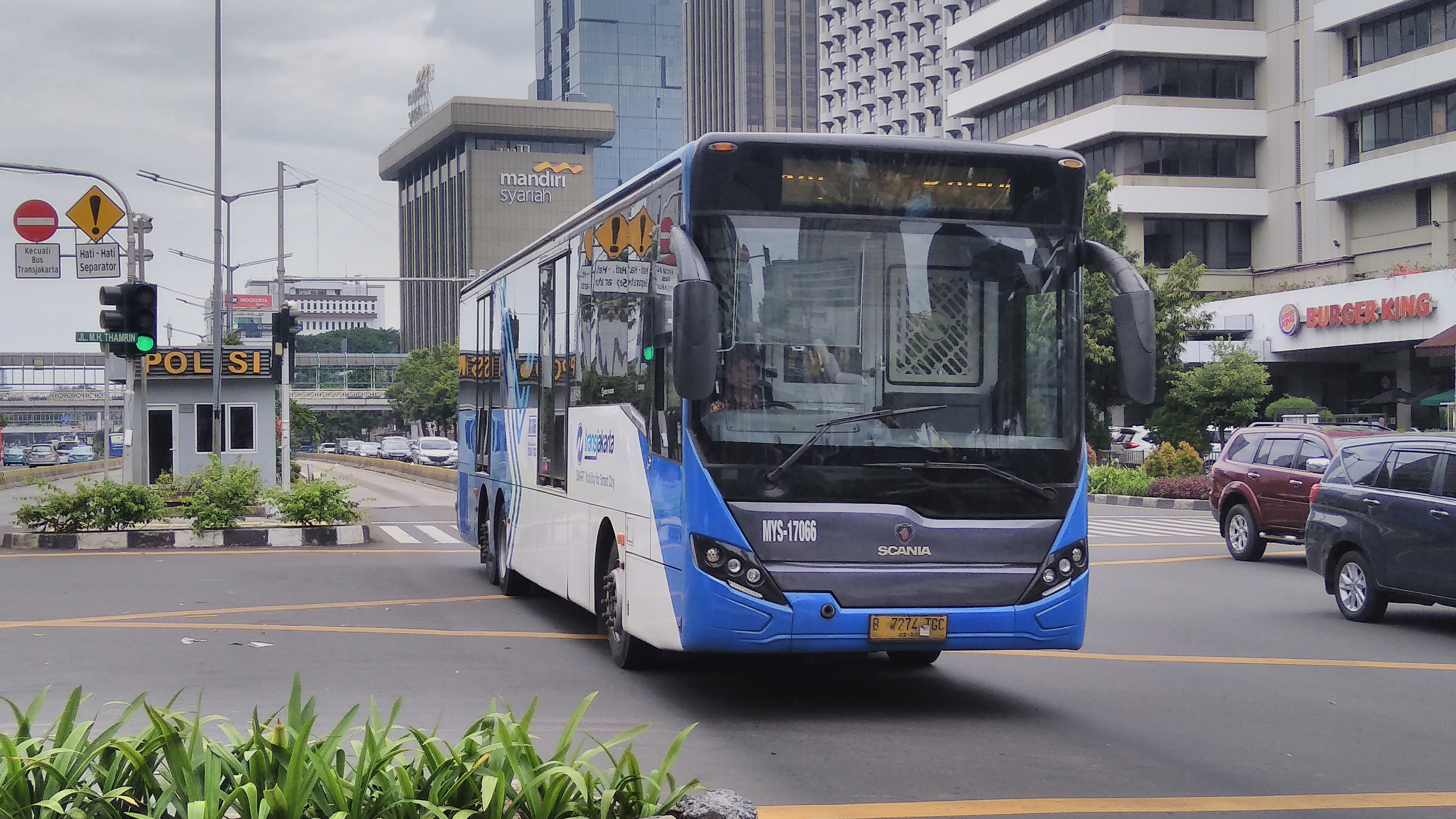
The Scania bus fleet that serves Corridor 1 at M.H. Thamrin Blvd. Taken on 17 March 2019.

Information correct as of December 2024

- Transjakarta (self-managed) (TJ):
  - Scania K320IA CNG Euro VI, white-light blue
  - Mercedes-Benz OH 1526 NG, white-light blue
  - Mercedes-Benz OH 1626, white-blue
  - Mercedes-Benz OC 500 RF 2542, white-blue
- Mayasari Bakti (MB/MYS):
  - Scania K320IA CNG Euro VI, white-light blue (MB)
  - Scania K310IB 6×2, white-blue (MYS)
  - Mercedes-Benz OH 1626 NG A/T, white-blue (MYS)
- Steady Safe (SAF):
  - Volvo B11R 6×2 A/T, white-blue (weekends only)
- Perum DAMRI (DMR):
  - Zhongtong LCK6180GC Euro 5, white-blue
  - Zhongtong LCK6126EVGRA1 e-bus, white-blue
  - Skywell NJL6126BEV BRT e-bus, white-dark blue
- Bianglala Metropolitan (BMP):
  - SAG Golden Dragon XML6125JEVJ0C3 e-bus, white-blue
  - Mercedes-Benz OH 1626, white-blue (night bus (22:00 - 05:00))

== Depots ==
- Transjakarta (self-managed) (TJ):
  - Pulo Gadung (articulated buses)
  - Cawang
- Perum DAMRI (DMR):
  - Cakung
  - Pulo Gadung
- Steady Safe (SAF):
  - Klender
- Mayasari Bakti (MB/MYS):
  - Klender
  - Cijantung
- Bianglala Metropolitan (BMP):
  - Ciputat

== Incidents ==
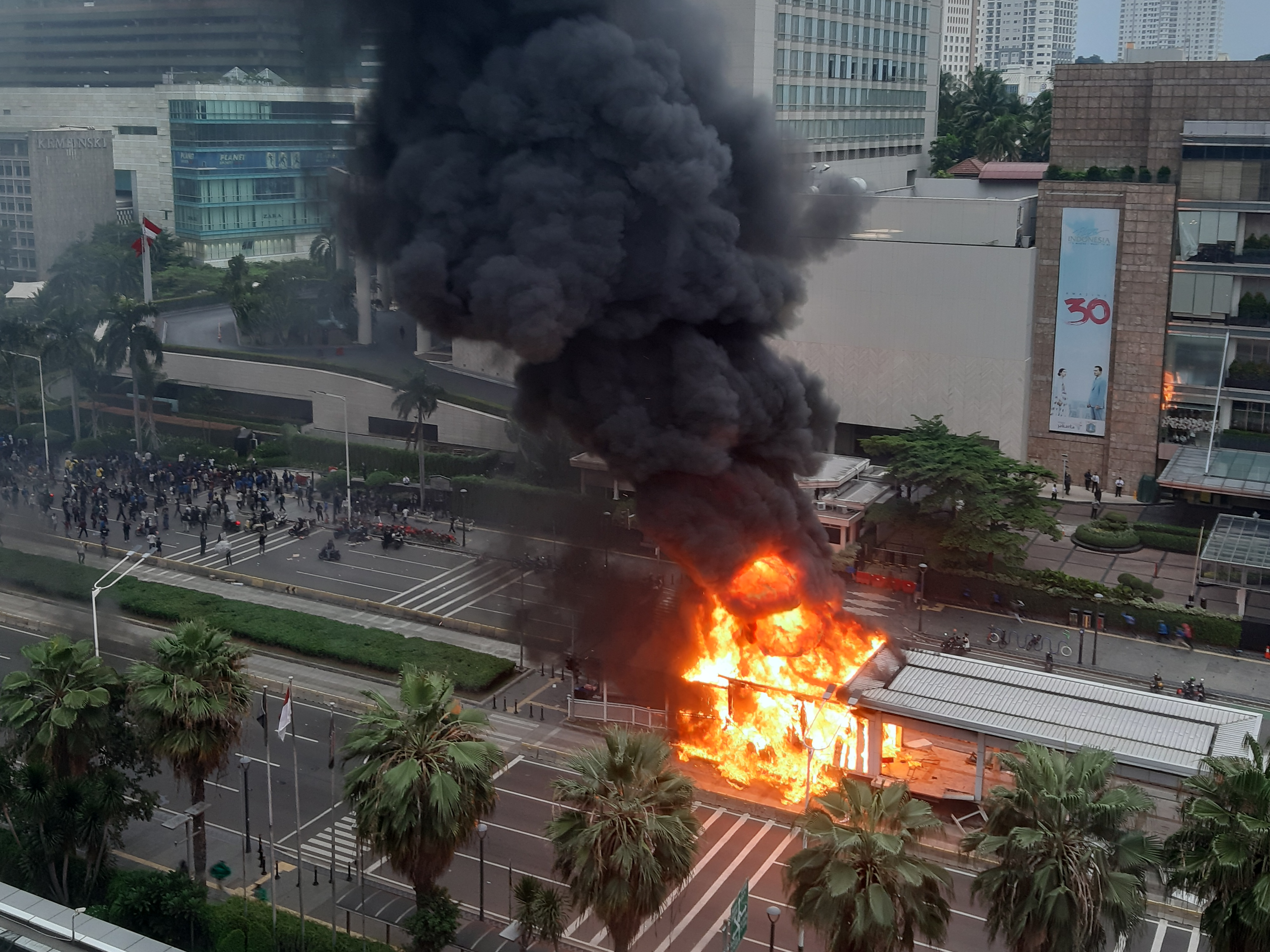
The Bundaran HI BRT station on fire during the Omnibus law protests

On 8 October 2020, four BRT stations on Corridor 1 were burned by protesters during the Omnibus Law protests: Sarinah, Bundaran HI, Tosari, and Karet. Transjakarta estimated losses of up to 45 billion rupiah across all 18 affected BRT stations. Other affected stations included Harmoni, Bank Indonesia, Dukuh Atas, and Bendungan Hilir.

== Gallery ==
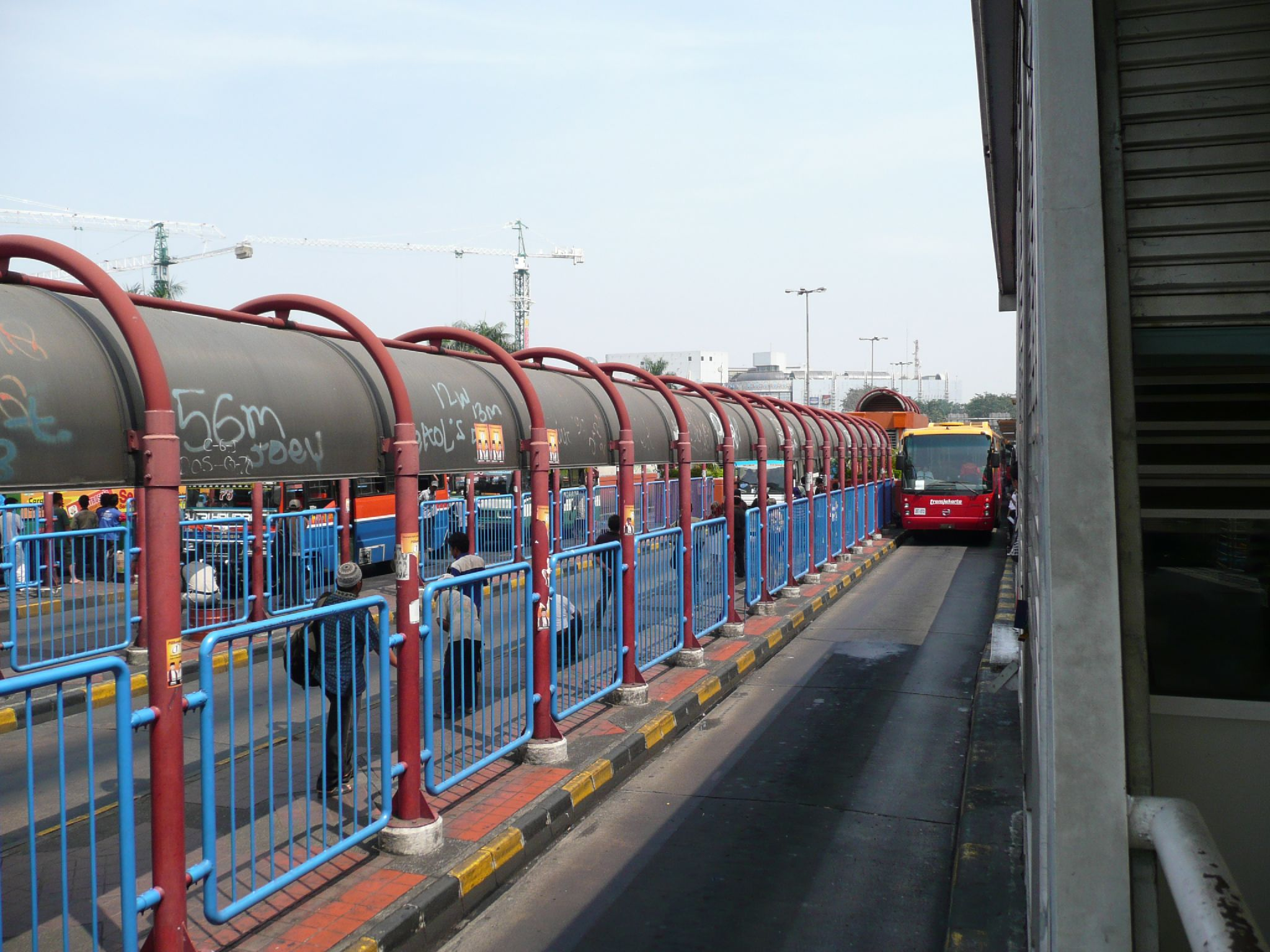
The Blok M bus terminal as the south terminus of the corridor

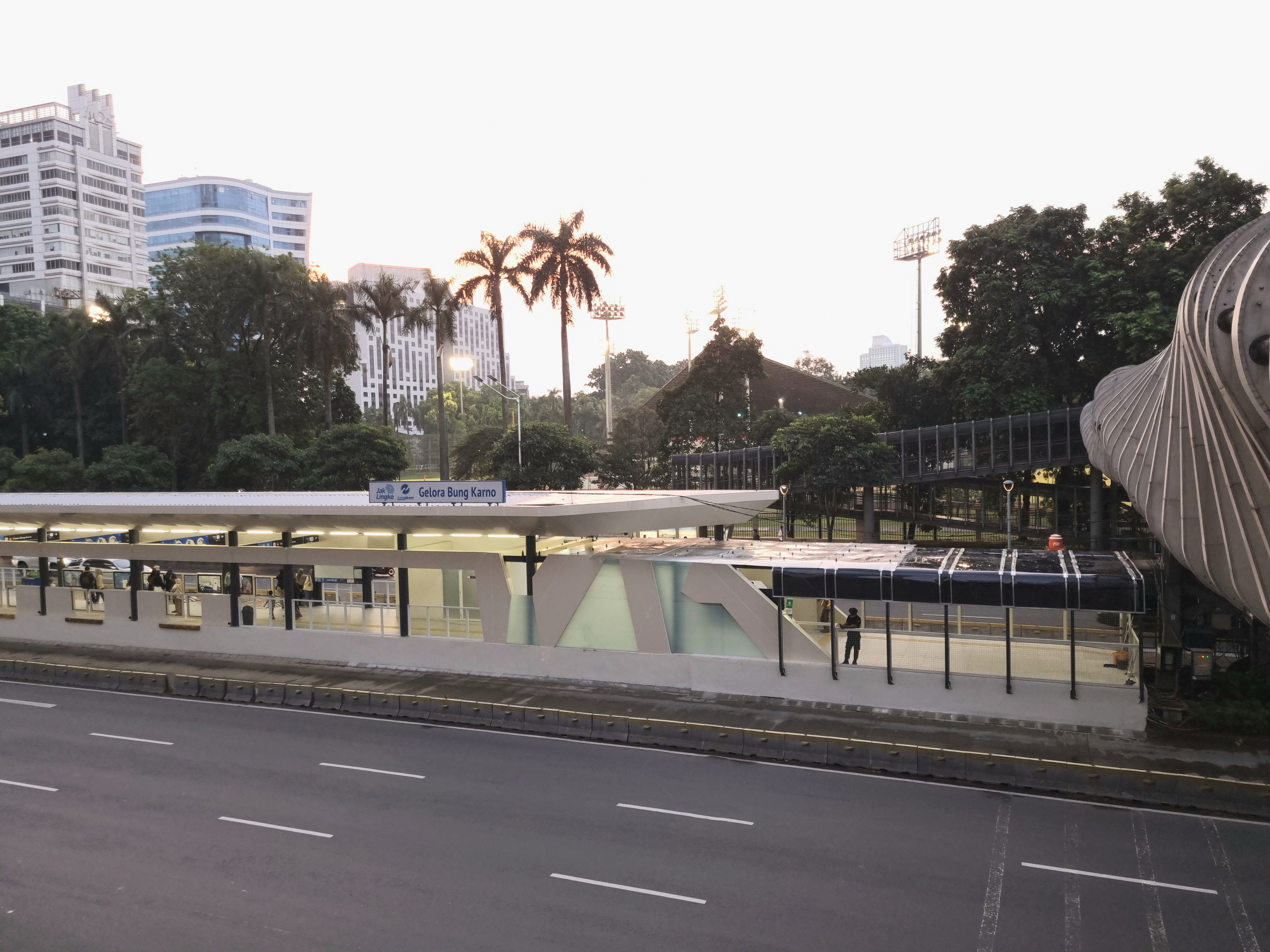
The Gelora Bung Karno BRT Station near the Gelora Bung Karno Sports Complex, before rebranded as Senayan Bank Jakarta

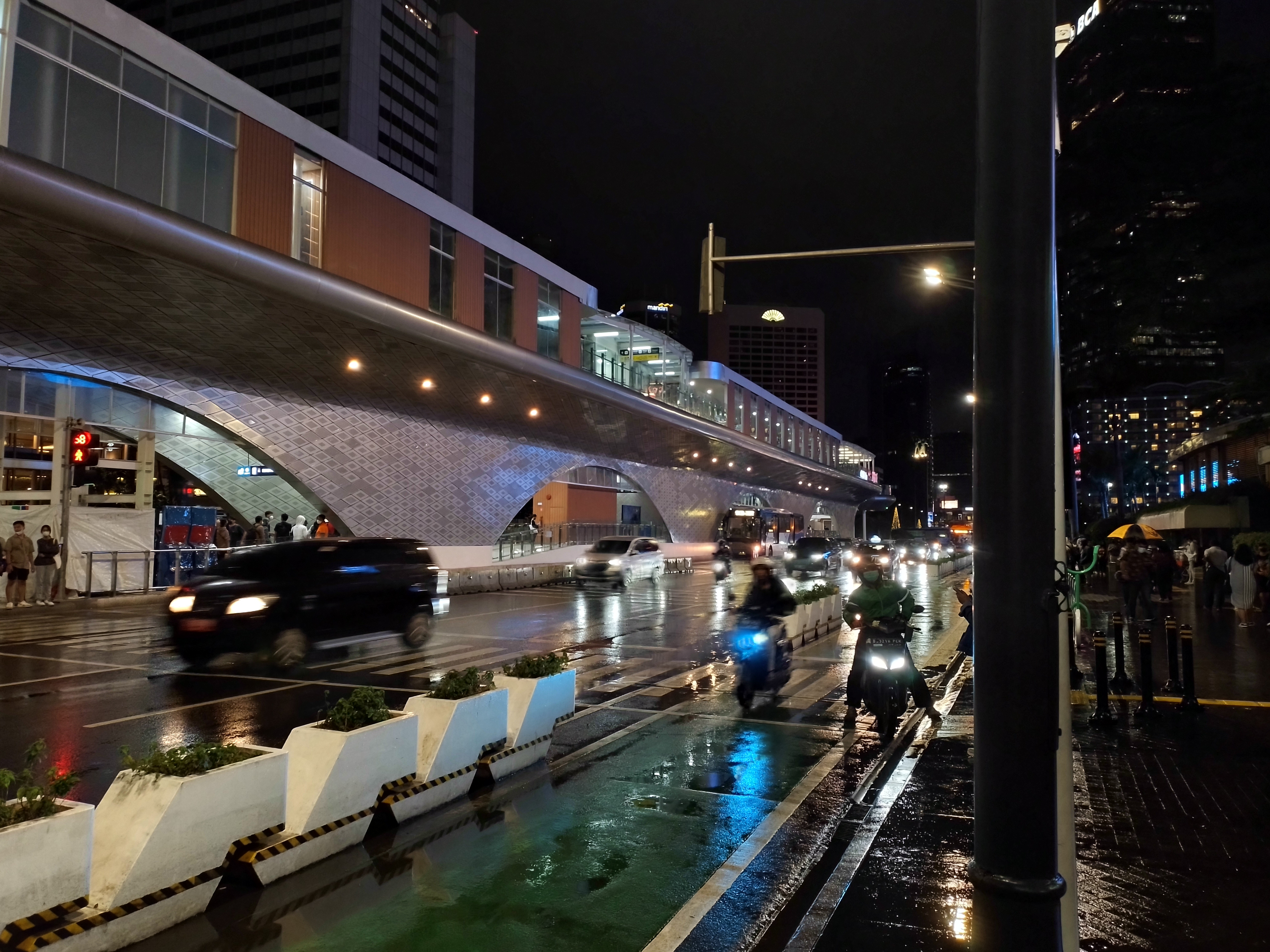
The Bundaran HI Astra BRT Station near the Selamat Datang Monument

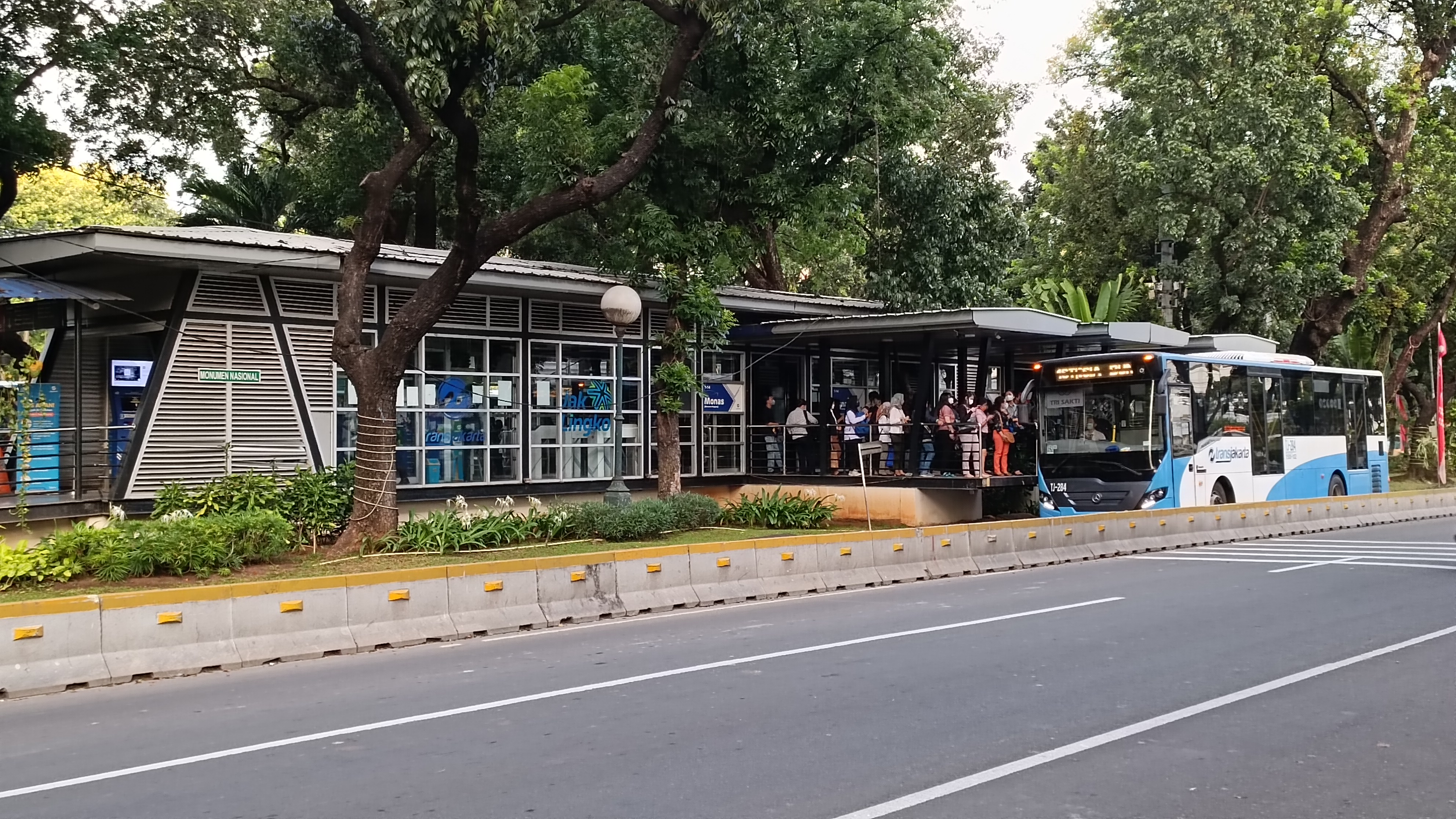
The Monumen Nasional BRT station near the National Monument

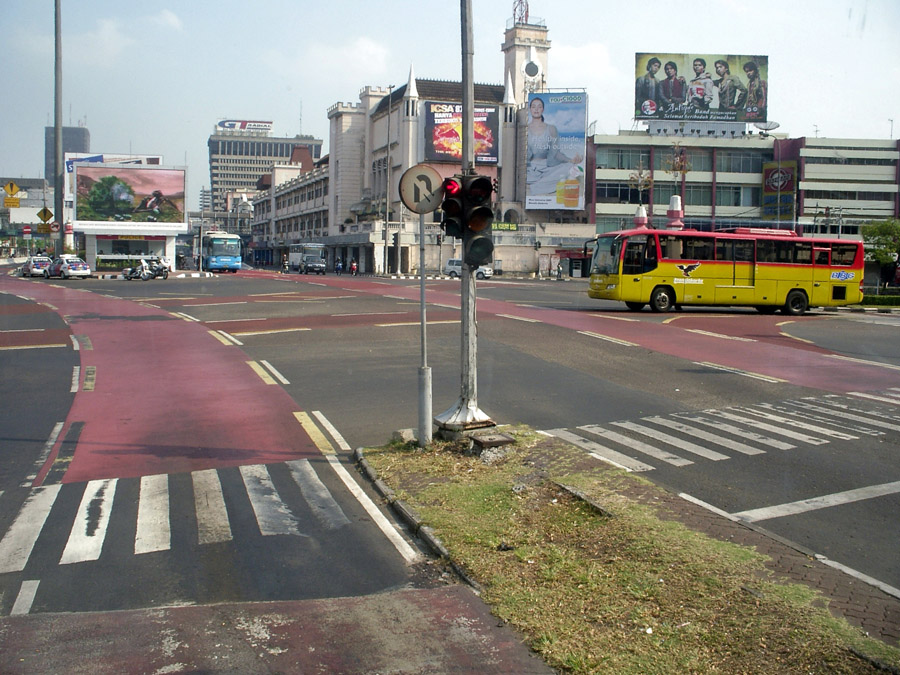
The Harmoni intersection near the Harmoni BRT Station (c. 2006-2007)

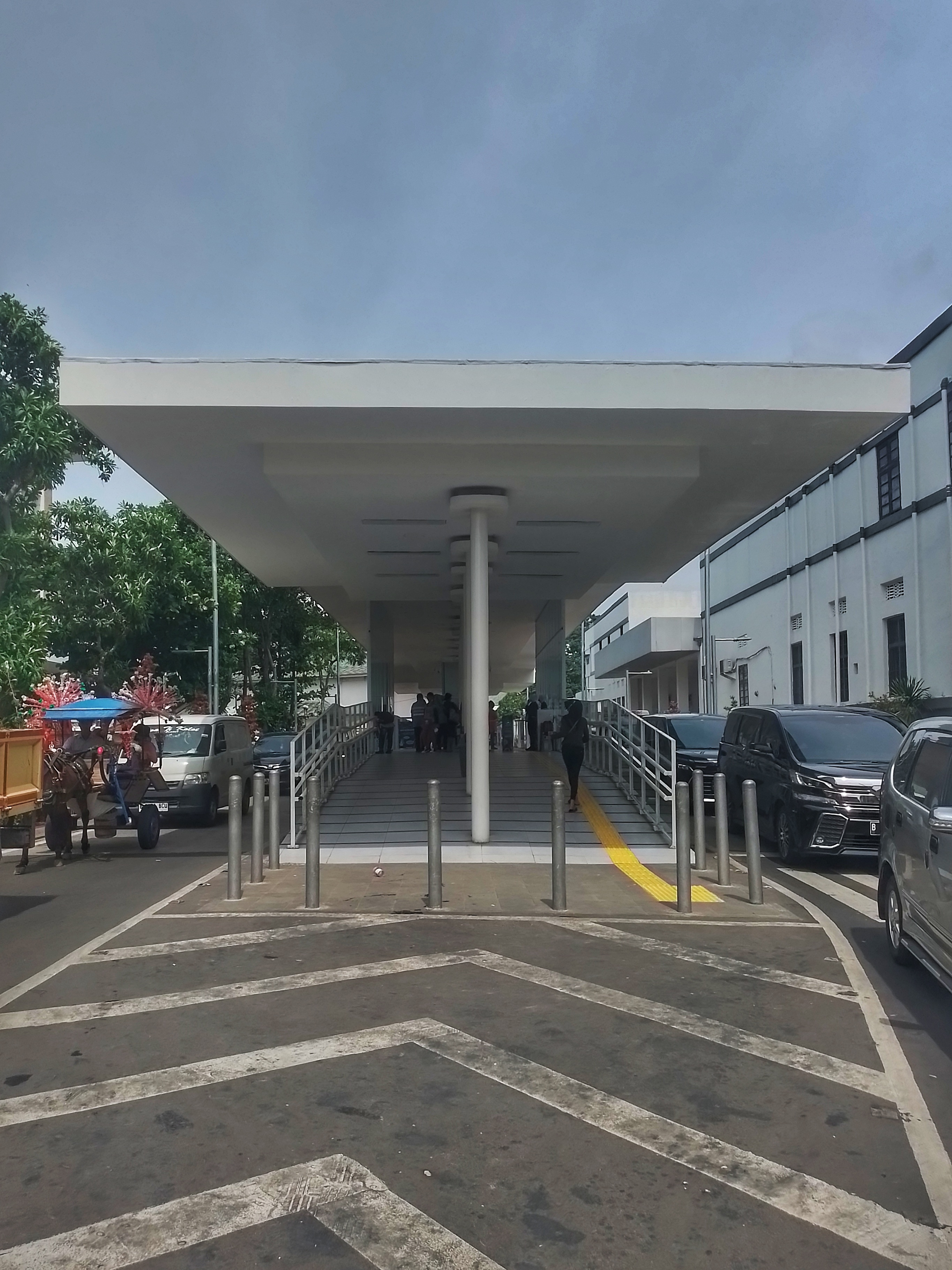
The Kota BRT Station as the north terminus of Corridor 1

== See also ==
- Transjakarta
  - List of Transjakarta corridors
