= Kota (Transjakarta) =

Bus rapid transit station in Jakarta, Indonesia

1 20 12 06 Kota
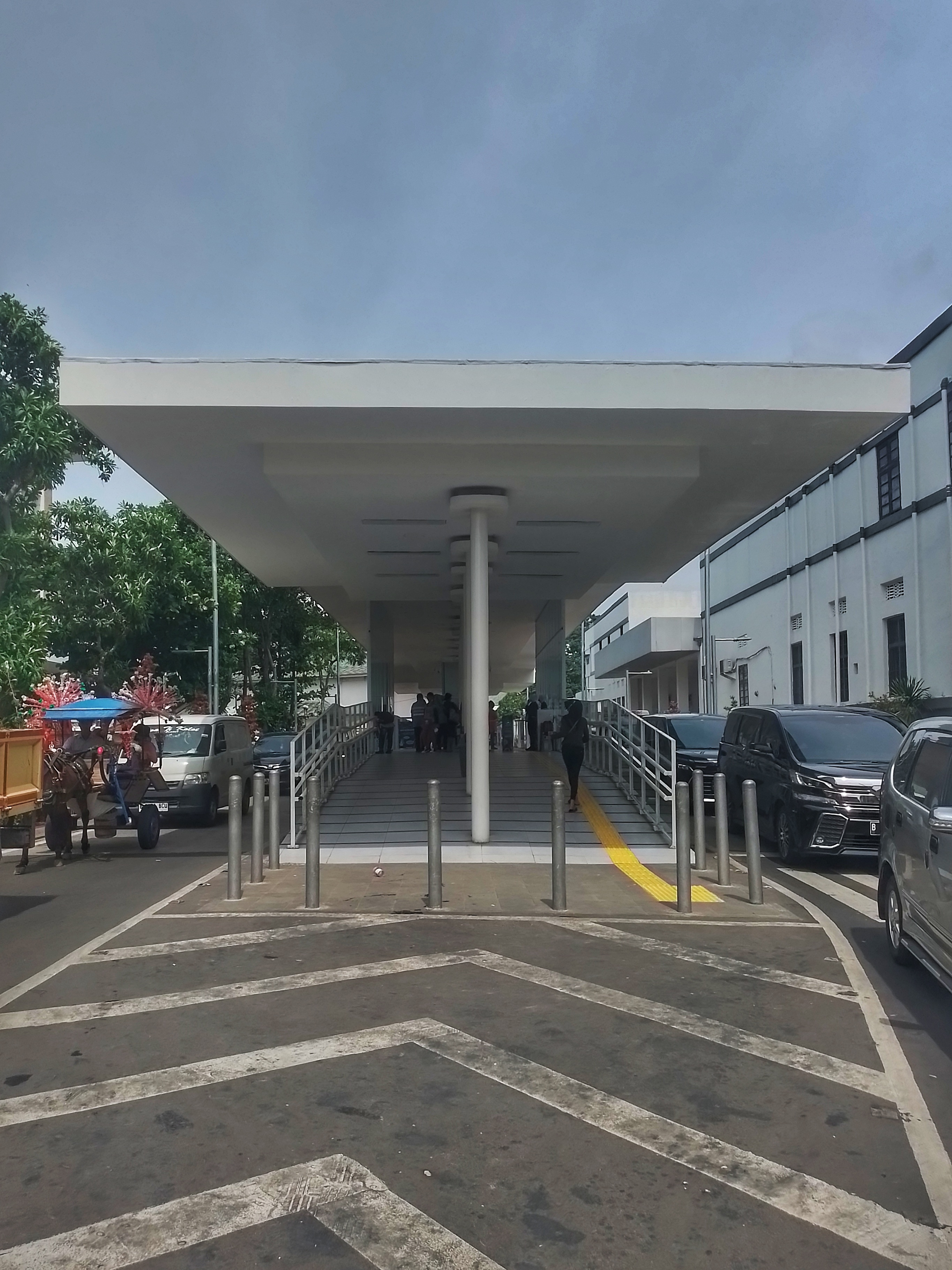
- The new building of the Kota BRT station at the north of the Jakarta Kota railway station

General information
- Other names: Jakarta Kota, Stasiun Kota
- Location: Pintu Besar Utara Drive, Pinangsia, Taman Sari, West Jakarta 11110, Indonesia
- Coordinates: 6.1369226°S 106.814917°E
- System: Transjakarta bus rapid transit station
- Owner: Transjakarta
- Operator: Transjakarta
- Lines: List of Transjakarta corridors#Corridor 1 List of Transjakarta corridors#Cross-corridor routes List of TransJakarta corridors#Corridor 12
- Platforms: Single island platform
- Connections: Jakarta Kota

Construction
- Structure type: At-grade
- Cycle facilities: No

Other information
- Status: In service

History
- Opened: January 15, 2004
- Rebuilt: June 22, 2022

Services
| Preceding | | Following |
|---|---|---|
| Glodok towards Blok M | Corridor 1 | Museum Sejarah Jakarta One-way operation |
| Glodok towards Damai | Corridor 3 Route 3H Terminus | Museum Sejarah Jakarta One-way operation |
| Museum Sejarah Jakarta One-way operation | Corridor 12 05:00-22:00 | Mangga Dua Raya towards Tanjung Priok |
| Museum Sejarah Jakarta One-way operation | Corridor 12 22:00-05:00 | Mangga Dua Raya towards Sunter Kelapa Gading |
Location

Kota is a Transjakarta bus rapid transit station located at the Old City of Batavia (Kota Tua Jakarta) in Pinangsia, Taman Sari, West Jakarta, Jakarta, Indonesia. The station, which is the terminus of Corridor 1, serves as an interchange with Corridor 12. The station is named after Kota Tua Jakarta and the adjacent Jakarta Kota railway station.

== History ==
Kota BRT station was opened alongside the soft launch of Corridor 1 on January 15, 2004, with full commercial operations beginning on February 1. Its original building was located west of the railway station and was accessible via a pedestrian tunnel opened in 2008; it included commercial areas and a lift for priority passengers.

Kota BRT station became the first station in the Transjakarta network to fully implement a new ticketing system with electronic cards, starting on May 5, 2014.

On July 22, 2022 Kota BRT station was relocated north of Jakarta Kota Station because the original location no longer served passengers and was being demolished. This rearrangement was carried out within the framework of the Kota Tua revitalisation and as an effort to integrate the BRT station with the Kota MRT station, which is under construction. The old pedestrian tunnel is currently being modified to serve as the MRT station entrance, according to the design plan.

== Station layout ==
| North | ← (Glodok/Mangga Dua Raya) feeder route to Balai Kota, to Tanjung Priok, feeder route to Kaliadem, and feeder route to Senen |
Island platform, doors open on the left- or right-hand side
| South | ← (Glodok/Mangga Dua Raya) to Blok M, to Damai, and to Tanjung Priok |

== Non-BRT bus services ==
| Type | Route | Destination | Notes |
|---|---|---|---|
| Inner city feeder | | Pantai Maju Promenade—Balai Kota | Inside the station |
| Inner city feeder | | Jakarta Kota–Kaliadem | Inside the station |
| Inner city feeder | | Pluit—Senen via Pasar Ikan—Muara Karang | Inside the station |
| Mikrotrans Jak Lingko | JAK 10 | Jakarta Kota—Tanah Abang Station | Outside the station |
| Mikrotrans Jak Lingko | JAK 13 | Jakarta Kota—Tanah Abang Station via Jembatan Lima | Outside the station |
| Mikrotrans Jak Lingko | JAK 33 | Jakarta Kota Station—Pulo Gadung | Outside the station |

== Places nearby ==
- Jakarta Kota railway station
- Jakarta History Museum
- Bank Indonesia Museum
- Mandiri Museum

== Gallery ==
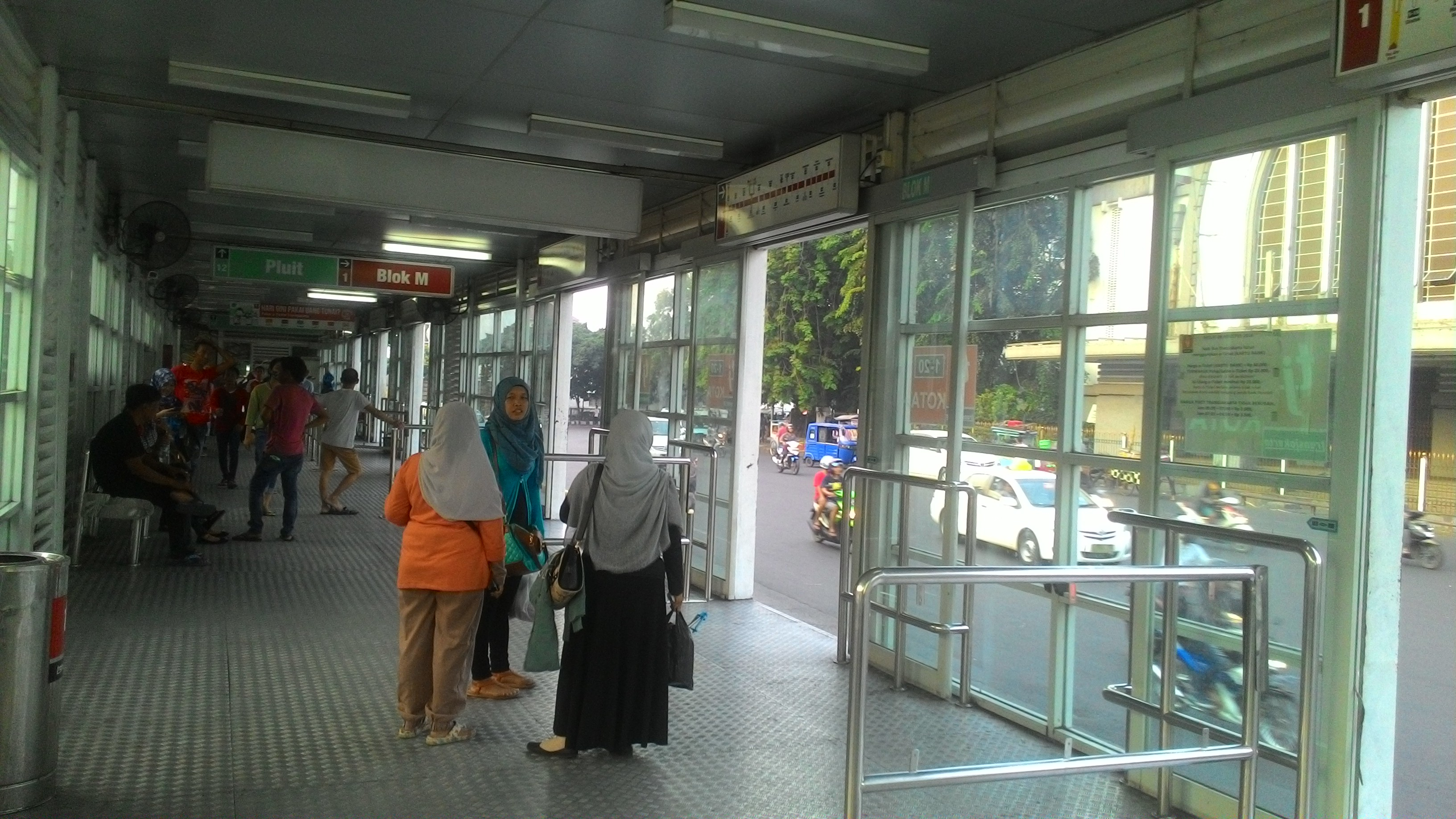
Interior of the original Kota BRT station east platform for buses towards Blok M/Tanjung Priok, 2015

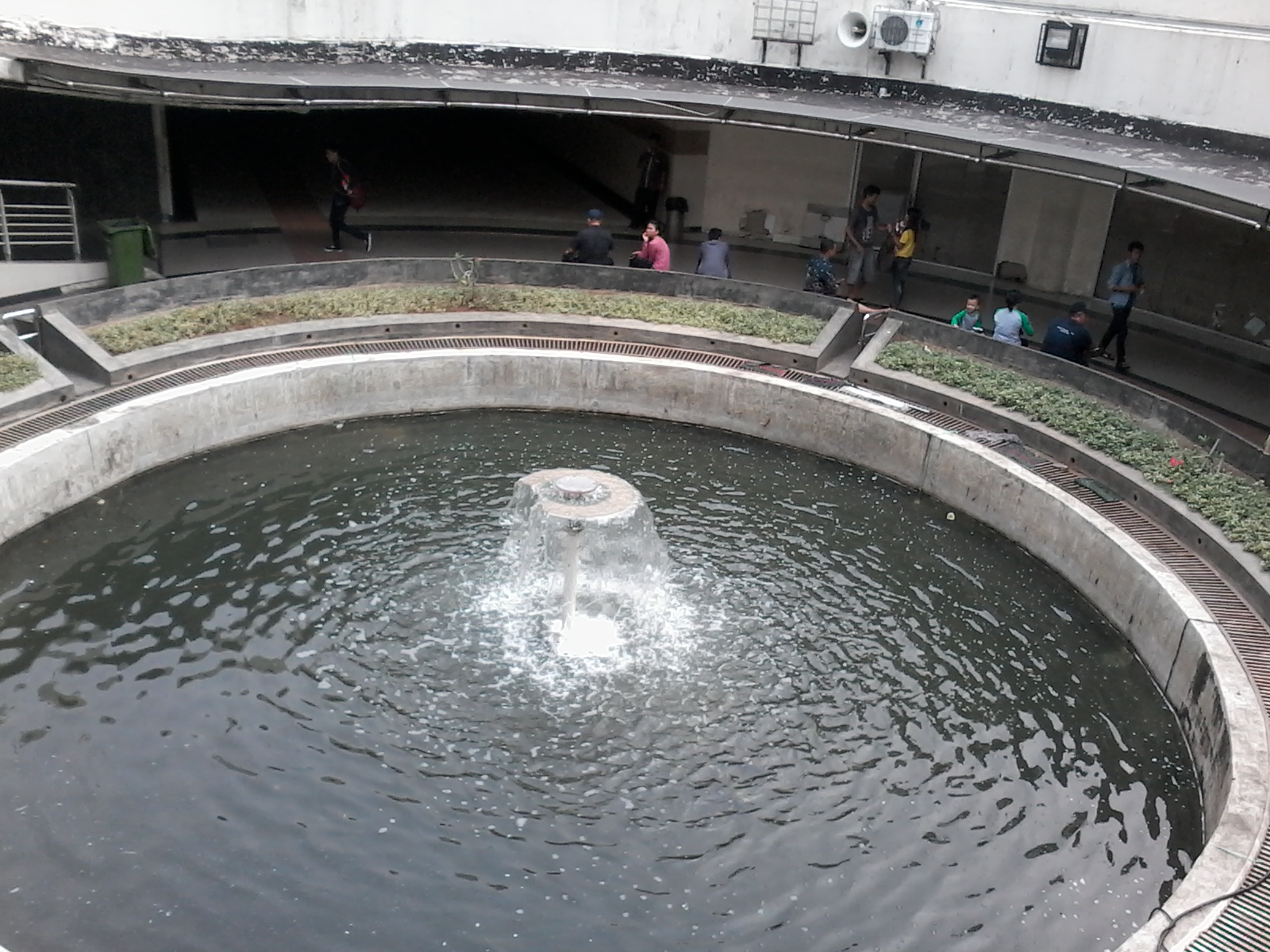
Water fountain at the pedestrian tunnel access of the original BRT station, 2013

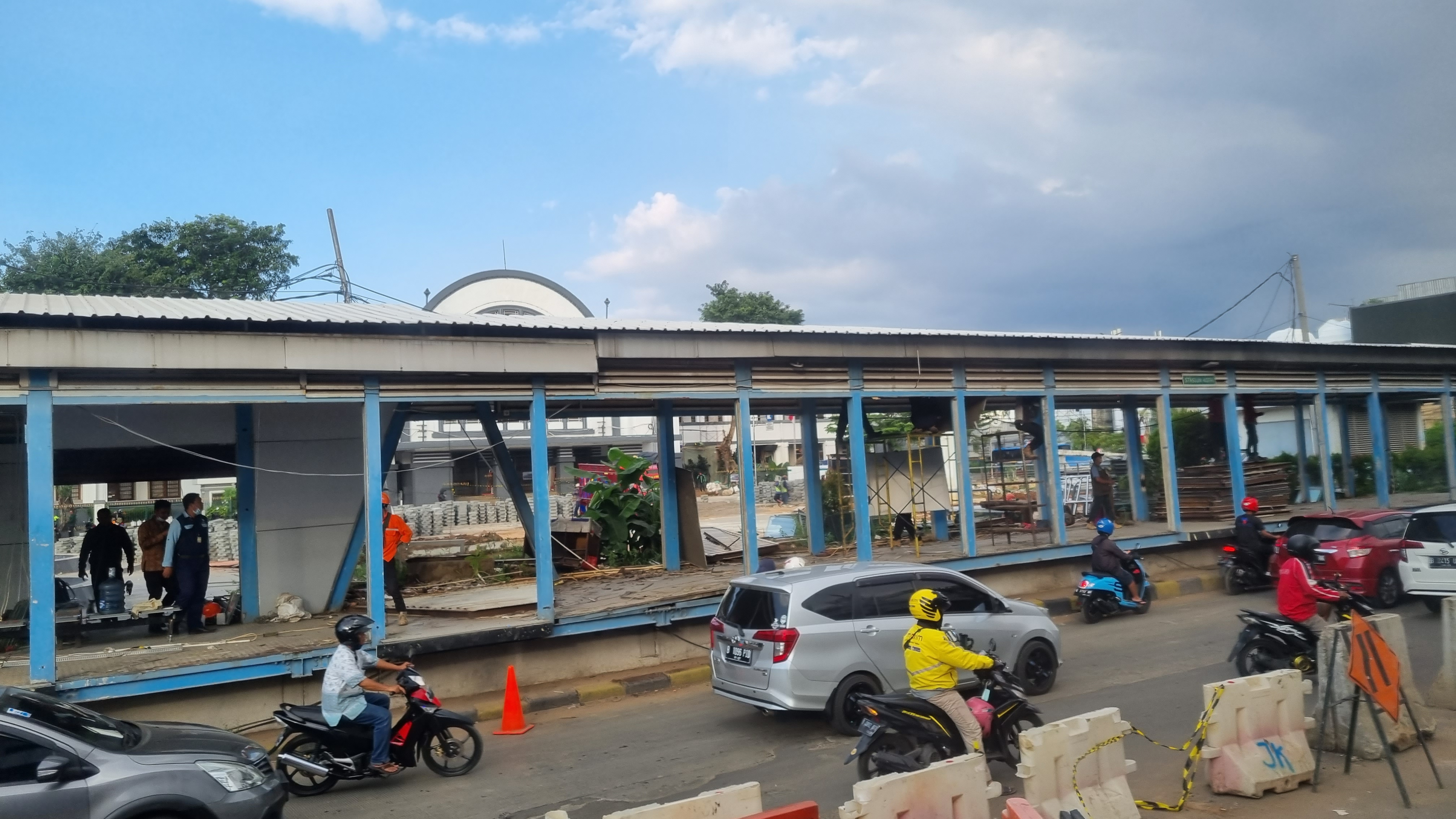
The old Kota BRT station during its demolition in July 2022, with the west platform in demolition process

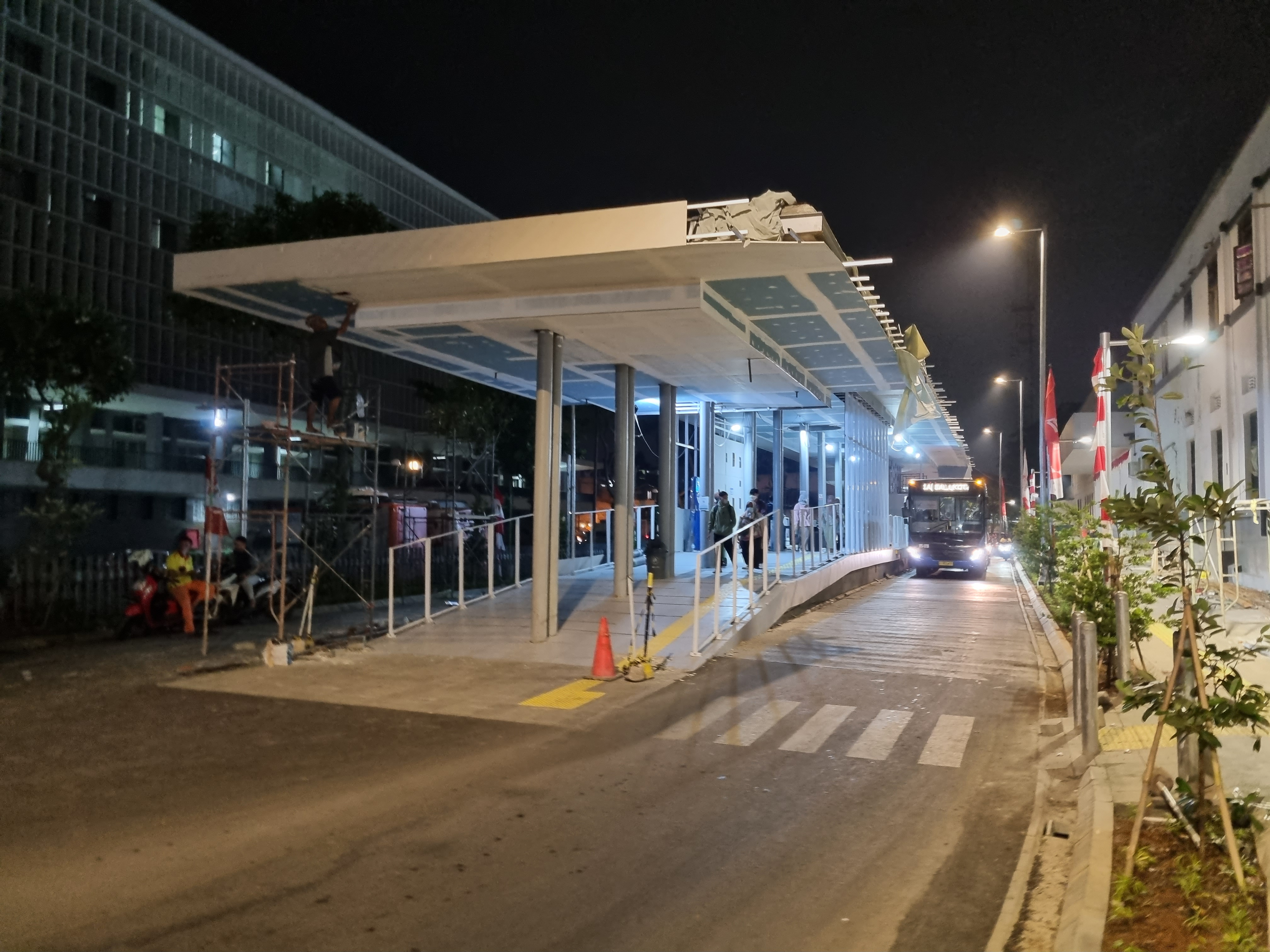
The frontage of the new BRT station building at north of the Jakarta Kota railway station

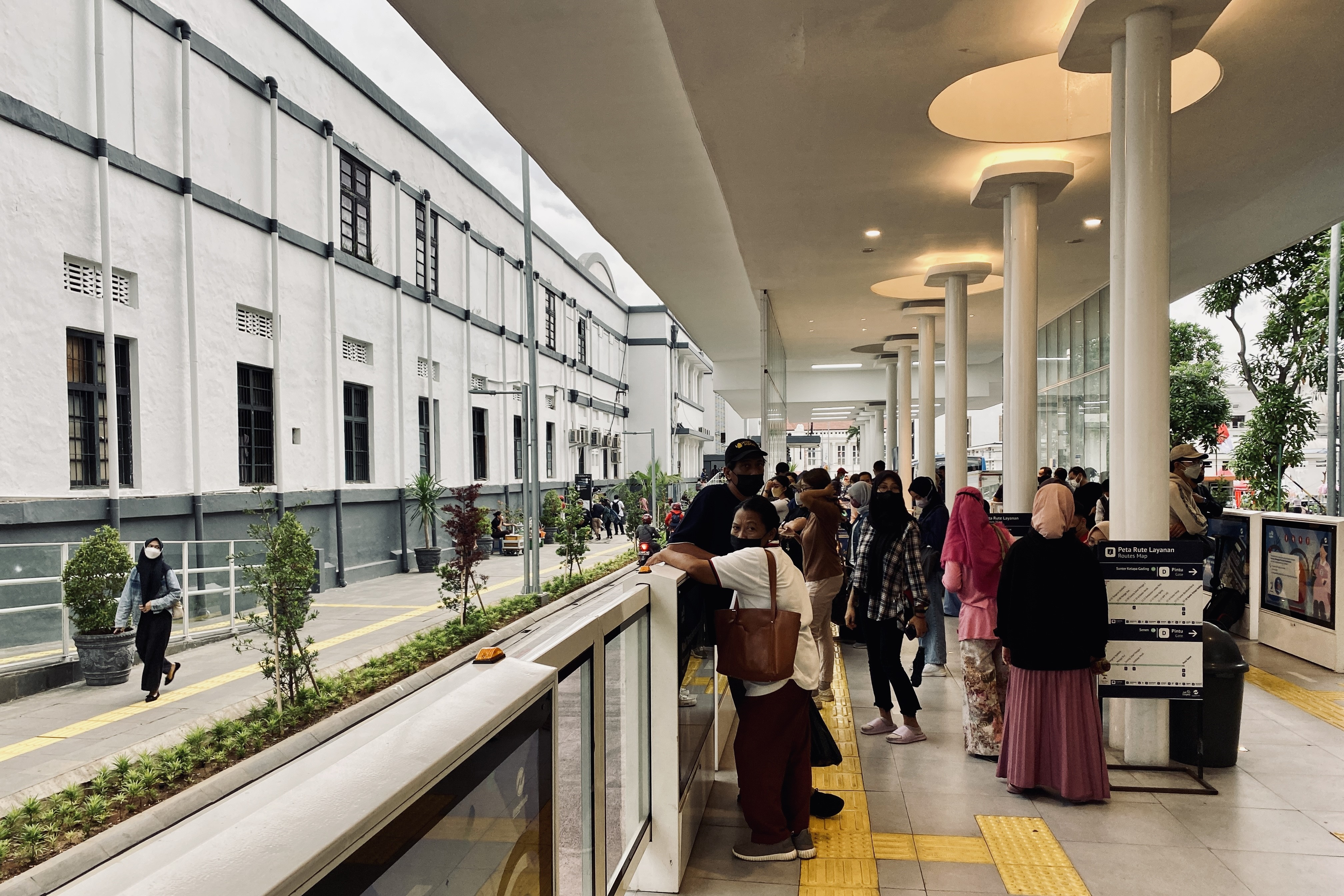
View of the platform area

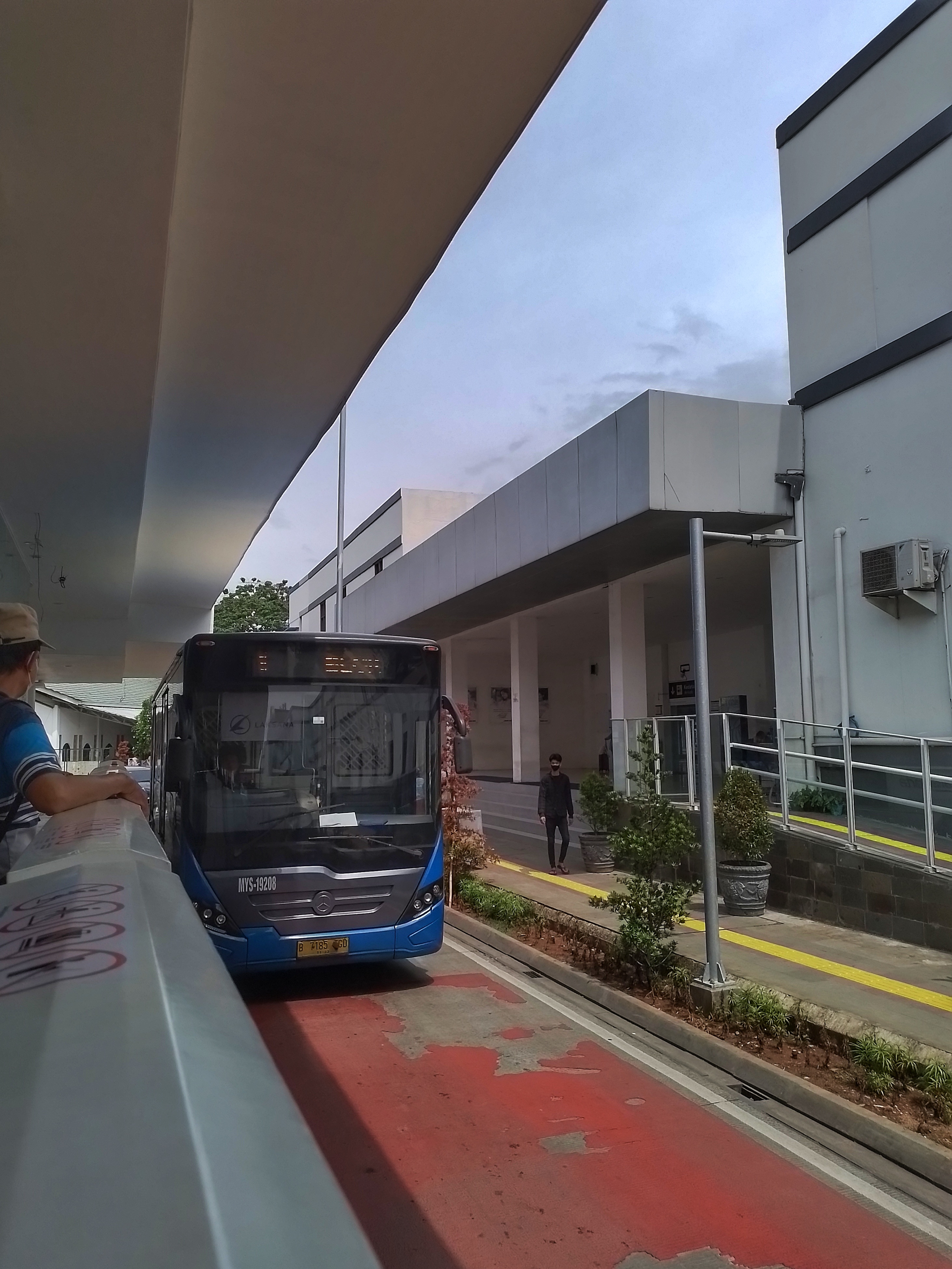
Transjakarta bus fleet approaching the BRT station
