= Blok M Bus Terminal =

Bus terminal in Kebayoran Baru, Jakarta, Indonesia

Blok M Terminal
- Terminal Blok M
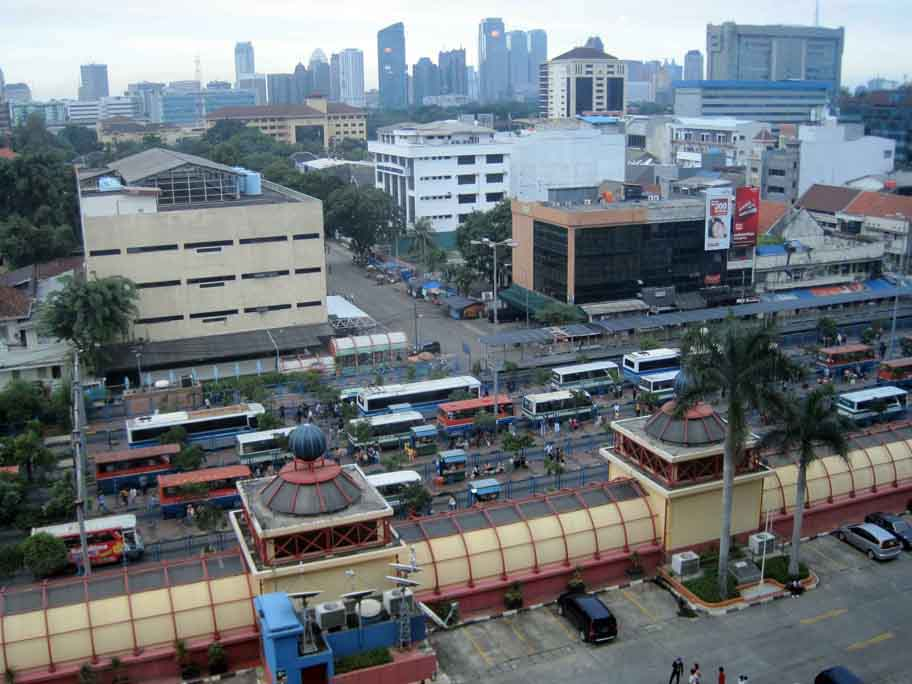
- Blok M terminal in 2010

General information
- Type: Bus terminal
- Location: Jakarta, Indonesia, Jalan Sultan Hasanuddin, Melawai, Kebayoran Baru, South Jakarta
- Coordinates: 6.2434937°S 106.8017898°E
- Opened: 1968; 58 years ago
- Renovated: 3 October 1992; 33 years ago
- Owner: Provincial Government of Jakarta
- Landlord: The Jakarta Government Office of Transportation (Indonesian: Dinas Perhubungan Provinsi DKI Jakarta)

Other information
- Parking: Available

Blok M Terminal is a type-B bus terminal located within the commercial and entertainment quarter of Blok M in Kebayoran Baru, Jakarta, Indonesia. As a type-B terminal, it only serves city transport buses that connect several regions in Jakarta and its surrounding cities. The terminal primarily serves Transjakarta's BRT corridors and feeder routes. State-owned transport company Perum DAMRI also operates a number of shuttle bus services from the Soekarno–Hatta International Airport and several planned townships in Greater Jakarta to Blok M terminal. Apart from DAMRI, Mayasari Bakti and Sinar Jaya also operate their bus routes to this terminal.

Due to decreasing service quality, the government planned to revitalize the Blok M terminal. This will be the second revitalization of the terminal after the first one in 1992, which forms the current building of the terminal.

== History ==
Kebayoran Baru was originally built as the satellite city of Jakarta, prior to the city's mass urban expansion, which have 17 blocks sorted from A to S. The first block (Blok A) accidentally became a spontaneous busy terminus point (known as 'shadow terminal' (terminal bayangan)) of public bus routes. In 1968, then-Governor of Jakarta, Ali Sadikin proposed to build a permanent terminal on a 2.2 hectares (22,000 m^{2}) plot of land in Blok M. Since the opening, it became a new terminus for all bus services to Kebayoran Baru, which was in a form of an open-air bus terminal.

In December 1990, Governor Wiyogo Atmodarminto wanted to revitalize the terminal, by combining it with a shopping arcade (later known as Blok M Mall) on the basement level. The first revitalization cost about IDR 80 billion at the time. In September 1992, the revitalization was completed, and the terminal was reinaugurated on 3 October of the same year.

The Provincial Government of Jakarta and PT. Integrasi Transit Jakarta, subsidiary of the Jakarta MRT, are planning to revitalize Blok M terminal once again in 2024. The plan is a part of the government's effort to redevelop Blok M as an integrated transit-oriented development zone and Jakarta's new economic hub, alongside the CSW-ASEAN TOD. The revitalization will create a direct connection from Blok M BCA MRT station and the adjacent Martha Christina Tiahahu Literacy Park into the terminal. As a preliminary stage, the government refurbished the building (particularly the shopping center on the second floor) and the surroundings to provide a convenient space for cultural and culinary events. On 24 May 2025, the early stage of the revitalization was inaugurated as the Blok M Hub by the Governor of Jakarta, Pramono Anung.

== Architecture and facilities ==
Blok M terminal is a three-storey terminal, where the first floor is the ground floor used as the platform of the terminal. The platform level is only accessible from the second floor. The second and third floors are built underground. The second floor is used as a shopping arcade known as Blok M Hub (formerly Blok M Mall or Mal Blok M). The third floor is used as the parking area, as well as a marketplace of used cars and other automobile needs.

=== 1st floor, platform level ===
Blok M terminal has six lines, with all lines serving Transjakarta routes. For Transjakarta, the first line is exclusively used for BRT services (namely Corridor 1); the second and third lines are used for inner city non-BRT routes; the fourth line is used for one feeder route to Ancol, as well as cross-border (Transjabodetabek) feeder routes to Bogor, Alam Sutera (South Tangerang) and Pantai Indah Kapuk 2 (Tangerang Regency); the fifth line is used for Mikrotrans service (namely route JAK-31, Blok M–Andara) alongside Perum DAMRI, Mayasari Bakti and Sinar Jaya buses; the sixth line is used for both Transjakarta feeder and DAMRI shuttle buses to the Soekarno–Hatta International Airport, as well as the Royaltrans premium feeder service to Cibubur and Summarecon Bekasi.

Line 6
← Perum DAMRI buses to Soekarno–Hatta International Airport

Transjakarta: non-BRT route to Soekarno–Hatta International Airport and Royaltrans routes to Cibubur and Summarecon Bekasi

Side platform, the platform doors are opened on the left side of the direction of travel

Line 5
← Perum DAMRI, Mayasari Bakti, and Sinar Jaya buses

Transjakarta: Mikrotrans

Side platform, the platform doors are opened on the left side of the direction of travel

Line 4
← Transjakarta: non-BRT routes
Side platform, the platform doors are opened on the left side of the direction of travel

Line 3
← Transjakarta: non-BRT routes
Side platform, the platform doors are opened on the left side of the direction of travel

Line 2
← Transjakarta: non-BRT routes
Side platform, the platform doors are opened on the left side of the direction of travel

Line 1
← Transjakarta: (ASEAN) to Kota
Side platform, the platform doors are opened on the left side of the direction of travel

=== 2nd floor, shopping arcade ===
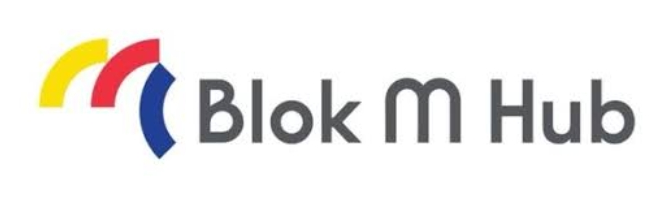
Logo of Blok M Hub

The second floor of Blok M terminal is a shopping arcade known as Blok M Hub (officially Blok M Hub Gojek for sponsorship reasons with Gojek), formerly Mal Blok M. It used to be one of the most popular and busiest shopping malls in Jakarta between the 1990s and the 2000s. The mall was best known for its affordable clothing markets, and it had Ramayana Department Store and Robinson Supermarket as the anchor tenants until 2017. Due to losing the market competition that resulted the significant decline of visitors, caused by the existence of e-commerce and the COVID-19 pandemic, nearly all kiosks in Blok M Mall have been permanently closed and the mall become very quite and empty.

The 2025 revitalization of the terminal sought the revival of the mall's golden years. It now serves as a new culinary and cultural center, as well as an exhibition space for small and medium enterprises.

== Transjakarta routes ==
1 01 Blok M
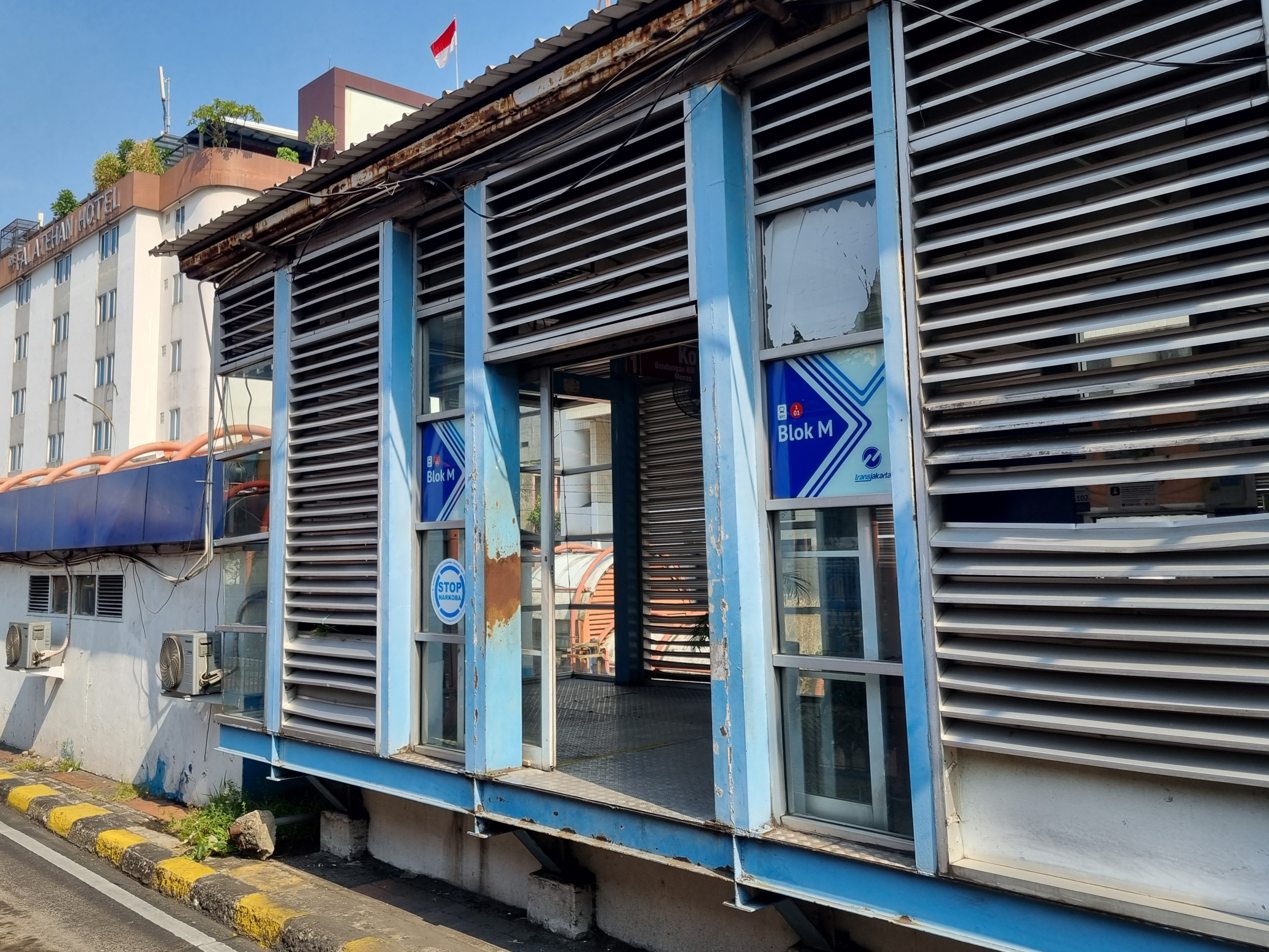
- The passenger boarding platform segment, taken in 2024

General information
- Location: Blok M Bus Terminal, Melawai, Kebayoran Baru, South Jakarta, Jakarta 12160, Indonesia
- System: Transjakarta bus rapid transit station
- Owner: Transjakarta
- Operator: Transjakarta
- Lines: List of Transjakarta corridors#Corridor 1
- Platforms: 1 side platform (BRT corridors); 3 side platforms (Non-BRT routes)
- Connections: Blok M BCA

Construction
- Structure type: At-grade
- Cycle facilities: No
- Accessible: No

Other information
- Status: In service

History
- Opened: 15 January 2004

Services
Preceding		Following
Kejaksaan Agung One-way operation	Corridor 1 Terminus	ASEAN towards Kali Besar
Location

Transjakarta
Service type	Corridor	Destination	Fare (IDR)	Platform line
Regular BRT	List of Transjakarta corridors#Corridor 1	Blok M - Kota	3,500	Line 1
Inner-city feeder (Note: Some of them are the successors of Kopaja and MetroMini, which ceased operating in 2020.)		Pesanggrahan - Blok M	3,500	Line 2
Inner-city feeder		Senen - Blok M	3,500	Line 2
Inner-city feeder		Blok M - Manggarai Station	3,500	Line 2
Inner-city feeder		Ragunan - Blok M (via Kemang)	3,500	Line 2
Inner-city feeder		Kampung Rambutan - Blok M	3,500	Line 2
Inner-city feeder		Blok M - PGC	3,500	Line 2
Inner-city feeder		Pondok Labu - Blok M	3,500	Line 3
Inner-city feeder		Meruya - Blok M	3,500	Line 3
Inner-city feeder		Rempoa - Blok M	3,500	Line 3
Inner-city feeder		Blok M - Pasar Minggu	3,500	Line 3
Inner-city feeder		Duren Tiga - Blok M (via Bangka Raya)	3,500	Line 3
Inner-city feeder		Joglo - Blok M	3,500	Line 3
Inner-city feeder		Bintaro - Blok M	3,500	Line 3
Inner-city feeder		Blok M - Ancol	3,500	Line 4
Cross-border feeder (Transjabodetabek)		Bogor - Blok M	3,500	Line 4
Cross-border feeder (Transjabodetabek)		Alam Sutera - Blok M	3,500	Line 4
Cross-border feeder (Transjabodetabek)		Pantai Indah Kapuk 2 - Blok M	3,500	Line 4
Cross-border feeder (Transjabodetabek)		Soekarno–Hatta International Airport - Blok M	3,500	Line 6
Royaltrans (premium)		Cibubur - Blok M	20,000	Line 6
Royaltrans (premium)		Summarecon Bekasi - Blok M	20,000	Line 6
Mikrotrans Jak Lingko	JAK-31	Andara - Blok M	Free	Line 5
Mikrotrans Jak Lingko	JAK-102	Blok M - Lebak Bulus	Free	Line 6

== Other routes ==
=== Perum DAMRI ===
==== Airport shuttle ====
- Blok M terminal - Soekarno–Hatta International Airport

==== Jabodetabek Residence Connexion (JR Connexion) ====
JR Connexion is a shuttle bus service that connects the Jakarta city center with several residences in Greater Jakarta, iniated by the Jabodetabek Transportation Management Agency (BPTJ) of the Ministry of Transportation. The list below are JR Connexion routes originally operated by Pengangkutan Penumpang Djakarta, before it merged with DAMRI in 2023.

- Blok M terminal - Sentul City
- Blok M terminal - Tamansari Persada Bogor
- Blok M terminal - Hollywood Junction Jababeka (via Jakarta Inner Ring Road - Jakarta–Cikampek Toll Road - Cikarang Raya - Cibarusah Raya)

=== Mayasari Bakti ===
- AC05A: Blok M terminal - Bekasi terminal (via Cut Meutia - A. Yani - Jakarta–Cikampek Toll Road)
- AC05B: Blok M terminal - Bekasi terminal (via Ir. H. Djuanda - H. Mulyadi Joyomartono - Jakarta–Cikampek Toll Road)
- AC34: Blok M terminal - Poris Plawad
- AC121: Blok M terminal - Hollywood Junction Jababeka (via Jakarta Inner Ring Road - Jakarta–Cikampek Toll Road - Cikarang Raya - Cibarusah Raya - Kedasih Raya)
- AC137A: Blok M terminal - Cileungsi terminal

=== Sinar Jaya ===
- Blok M terminal - Bubulak terminal
- Blok M terminal - Sentul City

== See also ==
- Pulo Gebang Bus Terminal – A type-A terminal located in Cakung, East Jakarta, which serves inter-city buses to several provinces in Java and Sumatra.
- CSW-ASEAN TOD
- Transport in Jakarta
