= Polda Metro Jaya (Transjakarta) =

Bus rapid transit station in Jakarta, Indonesia

1 06 Polda Metro Jaya
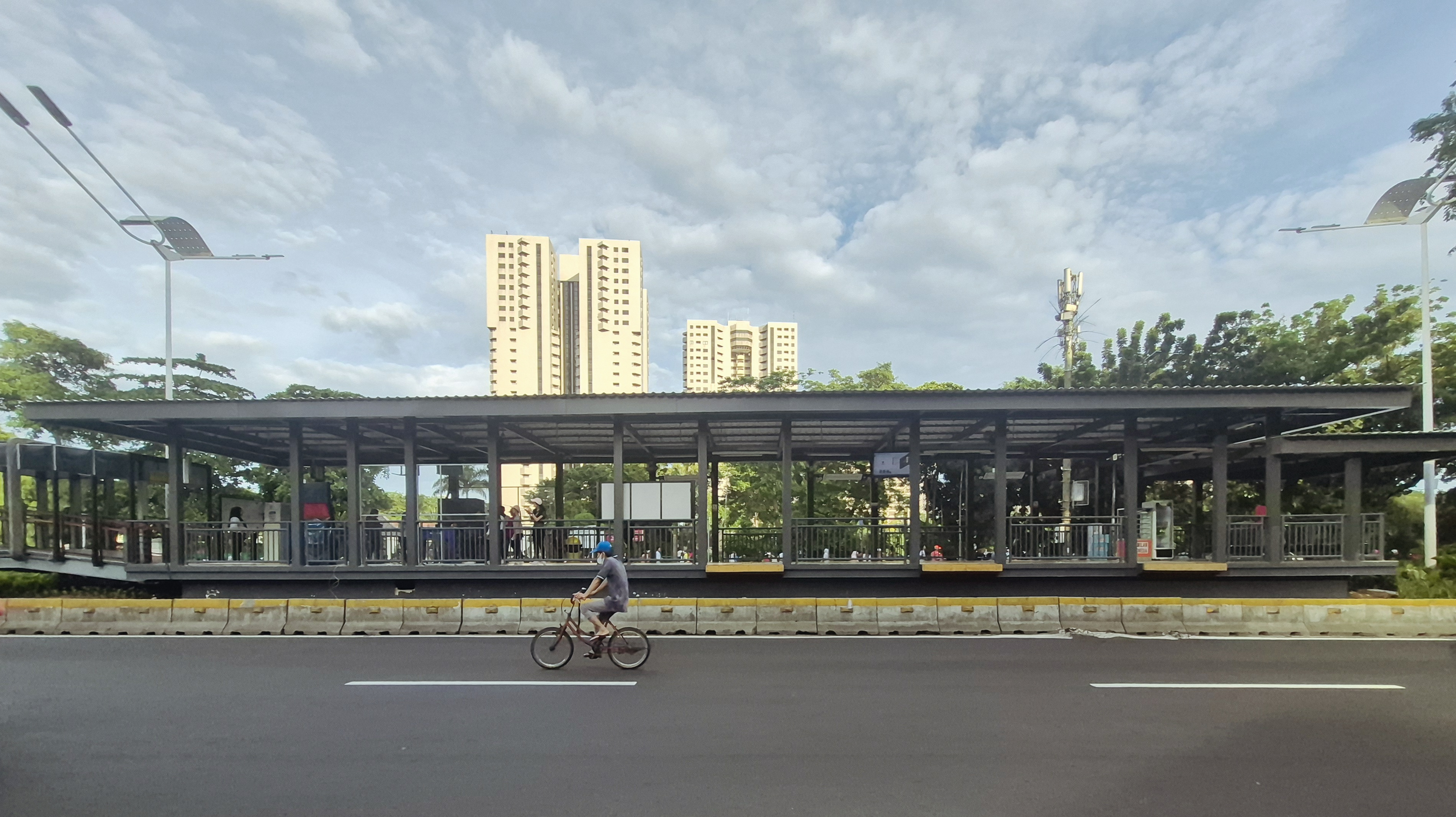
- Exterior of the building, 2025

General information
- Location: Jenderal Sudirman Street; Gelora, Tanah Abang, Central Jakarta (northern side); Senayan, Kebayoran Baru, South Jakarta (southern side); Indonesia
- Coordinates: 6.2214°S 106.8098°E
- System: Transjakarta bus rapid transit station
- Owner: Transjakarta
- Operator: Transjakarta
- Lines: List of Transjakarta corridors#Corridor 1
- Platforms: Single island platform
- Connections: Istora Mandiri

Construction
- Structure type: At-grade

Other information
- Status: In service

History
- Opened: 15 January 2004 (soft launching); 1 February 2004 (commercial operation)

Services
Preceding		Following
Senayan Bank Jakarta towards Blok M	Corridor 1	Bendungan Hilir towards Kali Besar
Location

Polda Metro Jaya is a Transjakarta bus rapid transit station located on Jenderal Sudirman Street, Kebayoran Baru, Jakarta, Indonesia, serving Corridor 1. The station is named after the headquarters of Greater Jakarta Metropolitan Regional Police (Kepolisian Daerah Metropolitan Jakarta Raya (Polda Metro Jaya, PMJ)) adjacent to the south. It is also adjacent with the Semanggi Interchange to the east.

== History ==
Like most stations in corridor 1, Polda Metro Jaya BRT station was opened together with the entire line on 15 January 2004. In 2013, the station first adopted the usage of solar panels, becaming a pilot project for other Transjakarta BRT stations to adopt renewable energy. However, in 2014, the station was relocated slightly to the north due to the construction of the Jakarta MRT.

In late November 2015, the access bridge of the station was cut in half, with the northern half being dismantled for underground utility works, according to the authorities. However, the station remained operating normally, but only be accessible from the south side, causing long detour for pedestrians on the north side to either access the station or just crossing the Sudirman road. Plans to rebuild the missing half of the bridge only emerged in late 2018, when the Jakarta provincial government initiated a revitalization for Polda Metro Jaya BRT station access bridge, as well as those in Gelora Bung Karno (GBK) and Bundaran Senayan. As the result, Polda Metro Jaya BRT station was temporarily closed on 2 November 2018 during its bridge's revitalization works. The missing half of the bridge was eventually rebuilt and was reopened together with the Polda Metro Jaya station building on 14 April 2019. The bridge has an iconic design similar to those in Bundaran Senayan and GBK.

== Building and layout ==
Polda Metro Jaya BRT station has a total of six platform bays, three for each side. The building has an open-air design, and now consist of simple black-colored exposed steel structure and half-height steel barriers.

West	towards Kota (Bendungan Hilir) →
Island platform, the platform doors are opened on the right side of the direction of travel
East	← (Senayan Bank Jakarta) towards Blok M

== Non-BRT bus services ==
The following non-BRT bus services stop around the Polda Metro Jaya station, last updated on 1 July 2026:

Type	Route	Destination	Notes
Inner city feeder		Blok M—Senen	Outside the station
Inner city feeder		Bundaran Senayan—JIEP Pulo Gadung	Outside the station
Inner city feeder		Tebet Station—Bundaran Senayan	Outside the station
Royaltrans (premium)		Cibubur Junction—Blok M	Outside the station
Royaltrans (premium)		Summarecon Mall Bekasi—Blok M	Outside the station
Royaltrans (premium)		SouthCity Cinere—Bundaran Senayan	Outside the station
#jakartaexplorer double-decker rour buses		Jakarta Skyscrapers	Outside the station

== Places nearby ==
- Greater Jakarta Metropolitan Regional Police (Polda Metro Jaya, PMJ) headquarters
- Indonesia Stock Exchange
- Pacific Place Jakarta
  - The Ritz-Carlton Jakarta Pacific Place
- Gelora Bung Karno Sports Complex
  - GBK City Park
- The Sultan Hotel & Residence Jakarta

== Incident ==
Polda Metro Jaya BRT station was burned during a protests on 29 August 2025, taking place at front of the PMJ headquarters. Riots erupted as protesters were able to broke through the HQ gate. Later, anarchist provocators set ablaze the BRT station, damaging the entire building and some parts of the skybridge. Anti-riot water cannon was set to extinguish the fire. On 8 September 2025, the station was reopened after reparations, with architectural elements such as the half-height glass walls with platform screen doors were replaced with simple steel barriers.

== Gallery ==
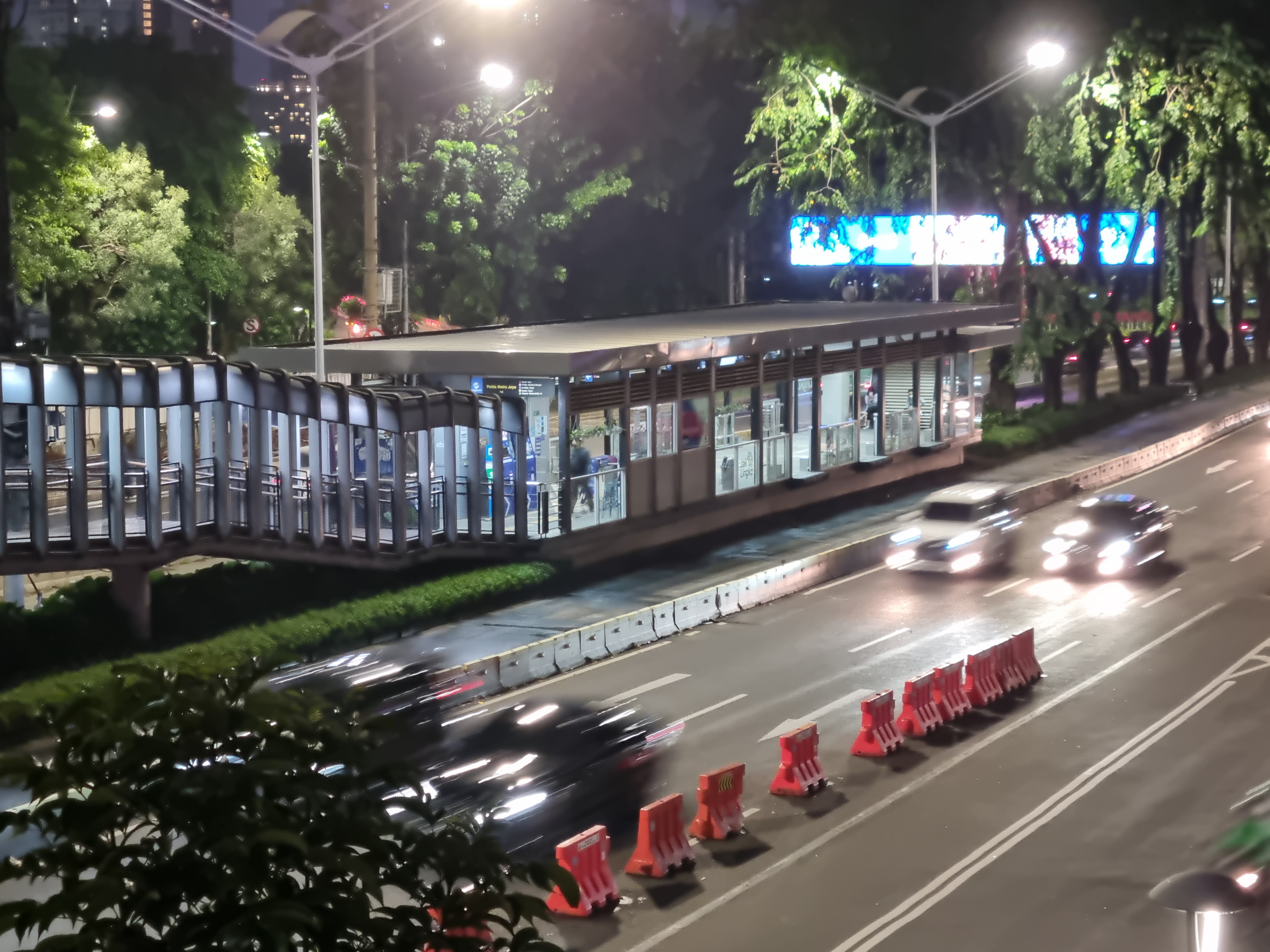
The station seen from access bridge at night, 2022

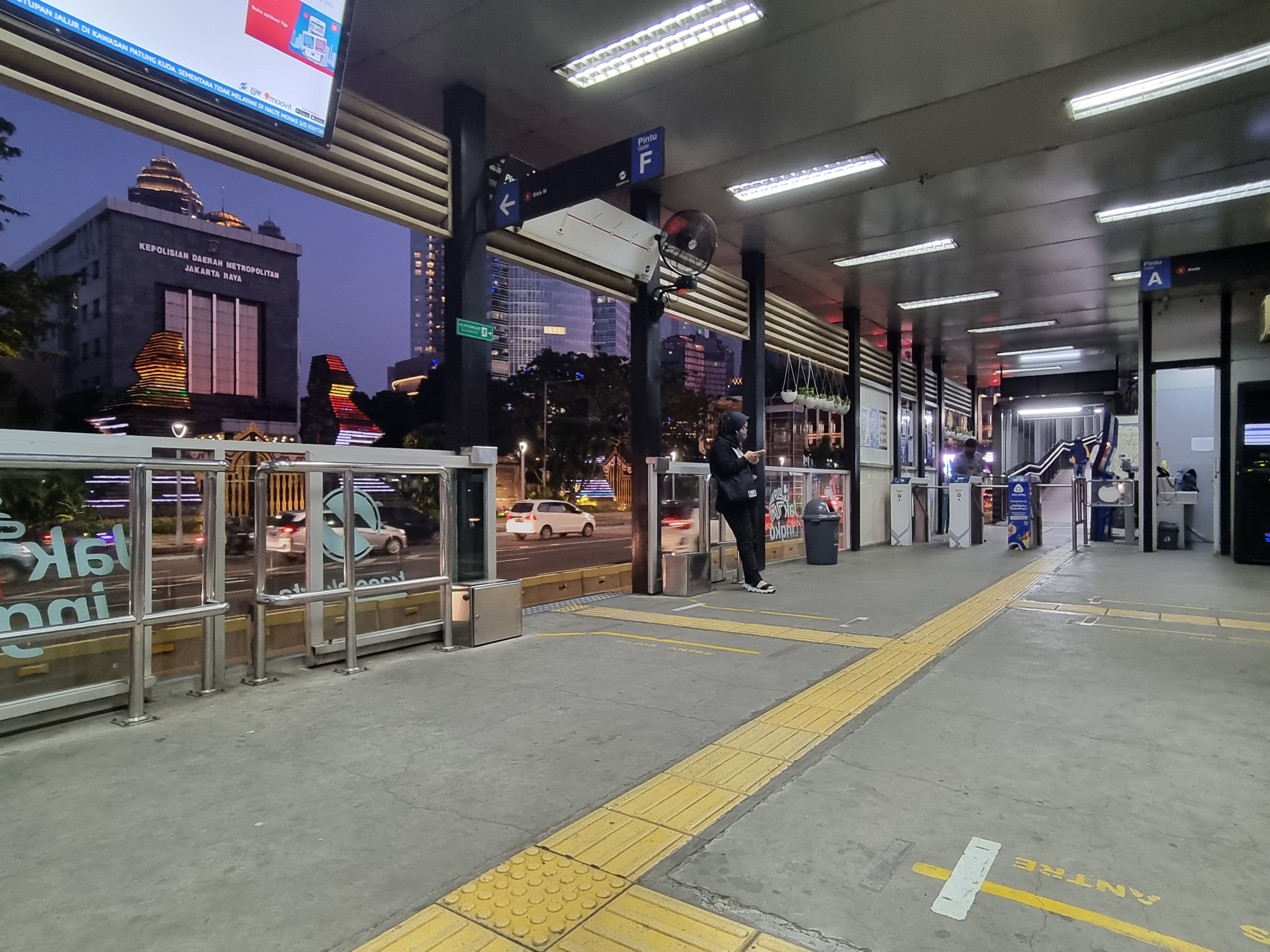
Inner view of the platform area seen in 2022. Note that after an arson incident in 2025, the half-height glass walls were replaced with simple steel barriers, and the celling that covered the roof structure was removed and left the steel structure exposed.

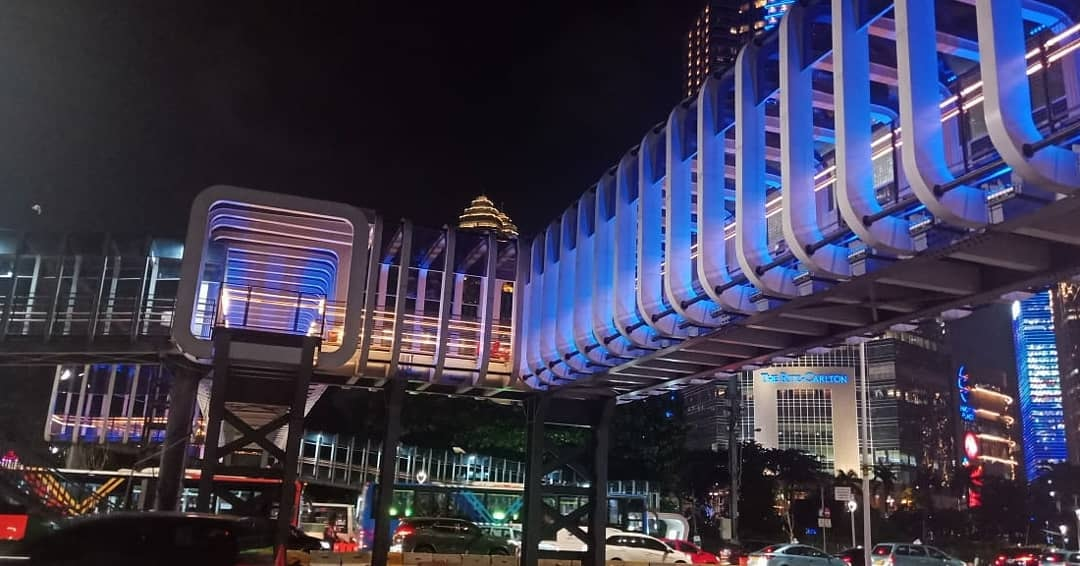
The access bridge after revitalization in 2019, illuminated in blue to commemorate World Autism Awareness Day that year

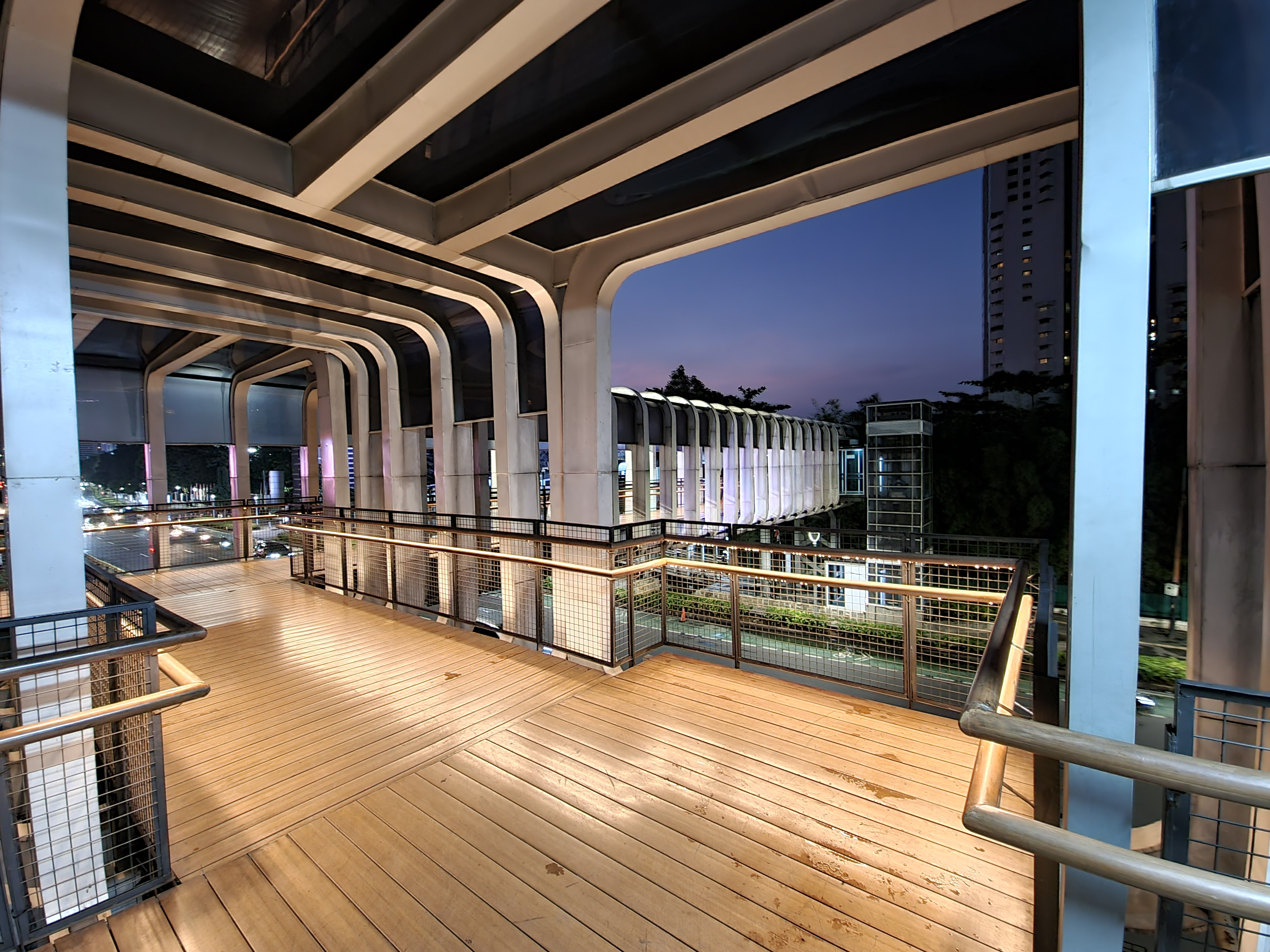
Inside view of the access bridge, 2022
