= Senayan Bank Jakarta (Transjakarta) =

Bus rapid transit station in Jakarta, Indonesia

1 05 Senayan Bank Jakarta
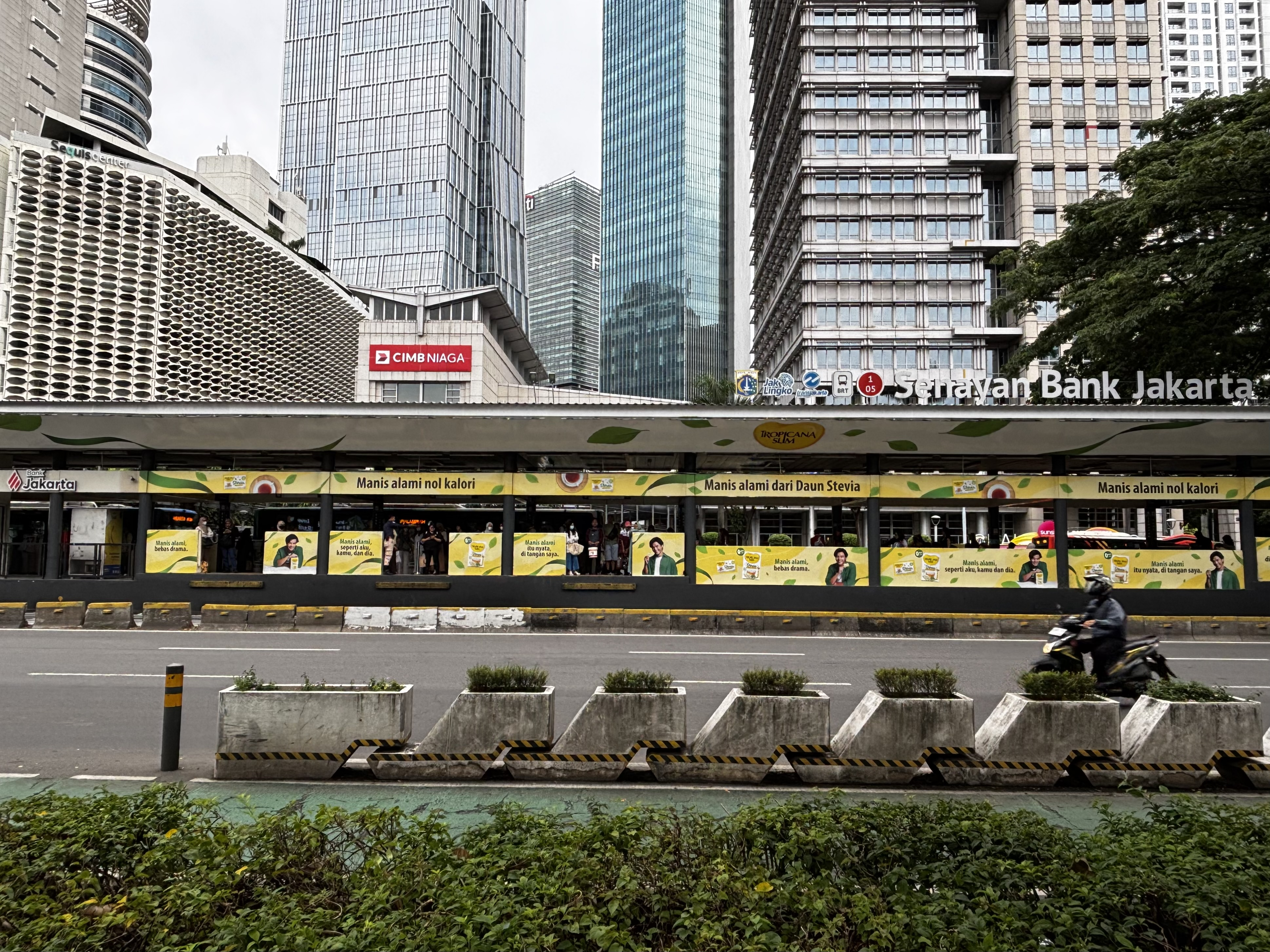
- Side view looking southeast, 2025

General information
- Location: Jenderal Sudirman Street; Gelora, Tanah Abang, Central Jakarta (north); Senayan, Kebayoran Baru, South Jakarta (south); Indonesia
- Coordinates: 6.2242°S 106.8057°E
- System: Transjakarta bus rapid transit station
- Owner: Transjakarta
- Operator: Transjakarta
- Lines: List of Transjakarta corridors#Corridor 1 List of Transjakarta corridors#Cross-corridor routes List of TransJakarta corridors#Cross-corridor routes
- Platforms: Single island platform

Construction
- Structure type: At-grade
- Architect: Pandega Desain Weharima (PDW)

Other information
- Status: In service

History
- Opened: 15 January 2004 (soft launching); 1 February 2004 (commercial operational)
- Rebuilt: 17 August 2022; 4 years ago
- Former names: Gelora Bung Karno

Passengers
- 10,000 daily (2024)

Services
Preceding		Following
Bundaran Senayan towards Blok M	Corridor 1	Polda Metro Jaya towards Kali Besar
Gerbang Pemuda towards Kalideres	Corridor 3 Route 3F	Terminus
Bundaran Senayan towards Ragunan	Corridor 6 Route 6V	Terminus
Widya Chandra Telkomsel One-way operation	Corridor 9 Route 9C	Bundaran Senayan Terminus
Semanggi towards Pinang Ranti	Corridor 9 Route 9C	Bundaran Senayan One-way operation
Gerbang Pemuda towards Tanjung Priok	Corridor 10 Route 10H	Bundaran Senayan Terminus
Location

Senayan (or Senayan Bank Jakarta, with Bank Jakarta granted for naming rights; formerly Gelora Bung Karno) is a Transjakarta bus rapid transit station located in Jalan Jenderal Sudirman, Jakarta, Indonesia. The station, which primarily serves in corridor 1, is located adjacent with the Gelora Bung Karno Sports Complex at north and the Sudirman Central Business District to the south.

== History ==
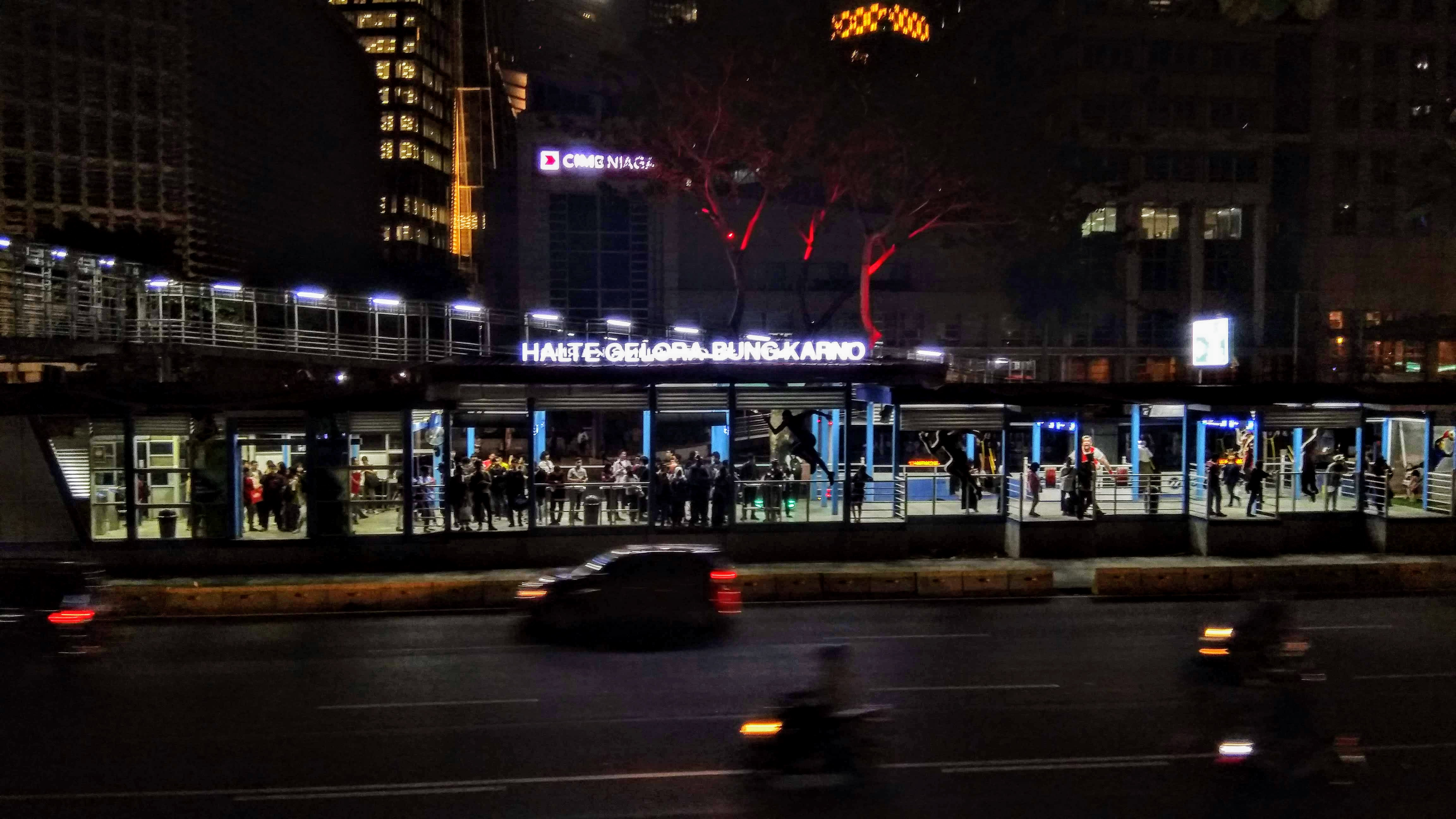
The GBK station prior to 2022 revitalization, taken after an expansion to accommodate spectators of the 2018 Asian Games

The then-named Gelora Bung Karno (GBK) BRT station was inaugurated along with the soft operational launch of Transjakarta Corridor 1 on 15 January 2004. Associated Press recorded on their covarge archive that this station was one of the most busiest and crowded station on the first day of operational, because the inauguration of corridor 1 was held at this station. GBK, along with all stations at corridor 1—and the BRT corridor itself—began its commercial operational on 1 February 2004.

The station originally had a small building with two platform bays (one for each direction), which was enlarged in late July 2018 to accommodate spectators of the upcoming 2018 Asian Games in the following month, using materials from former Masjid Agung BRT station. Platform bays were increased to 6 (three for each direction), with the building being extended to the southwest. The original extension part uniquely retained a tree, by creating an empty narrow space for the tree's growth.

In late 2018, two pedestrian bridges to access Gelora Bung Karno and Bundaran Senayan stations were temporarily closed for revitalization, being temporarily replaced by a pelican crossing. The revitalization of both bridge access to GBK and Bundaran Senayan were inaugurated on 28 February 2019 with a new artistic design.

On 15 April 2022, the revitalization of the Gelora Bung Karno BRT station began with 10 other stations, including Dukuh Atas 1, Tosari, Juanda, Cikoko Stasiun Cawang, Sarinah (now renamed M.H. Thamrin), Kebon Pala (now Matraman Baru), Kwitang, Balai Kota, Bundaran HI, and Stasiun Jatinegara 2 stations. As an alternative, a shuttle bus route from the National Monument to the Semanggi Interchange (1ST) was prepared to accommodate passengers during the revitalization process, which operates in corridor 1 until 11 September 2022.

The Gelora Bung Karno BRT station was reopened on 17 August 2022, coinciding with the 77th Independence Day of the Republic of Indonesia. The building was reextended again, which is slightly longer than the first one.

== Naming rights ==
Following the success of granting the naming right of Bundaran HI BRT station to Astra International in 2023, the municipal government-owned Bank DKI officially bought the naming right of the Gelora Bung Karno BRT station, which was first announced in June 2024. Thus, it was later revealed that Gelora Bung Karno would be renamed into Senayan, (Note: The name "Senayan" was shortly used by Gerbang Pemuda BRT station (originally Senayan JCC) on Corridor 9 since late December 2023. As the name "Senayan" is used for Gelora Bung Karno station for naming rights, the original Senayan [JCC] station of corridor 9 was officially renamed to "Gerbang Pemuda" on 10 July 2024.) a neutralized name before juxtaposing the brand name Bank DKI (stylized in all caps). The station, according to Transjakarta's CEO Welfizon Yuza, is one of the busiest and strategic BRT stations of the BRT system, as it served about 10,000 people daily and located adjacent with the Sudirman Central Business District and the Gelora Bung Karno Sports Complex. On 10 July 2024, the Gelora Bung Karno BRT station was officially renamed as Senayan Bank DKI with a launching ceremony.

In accordance to the rebranding of Bank DKI into Bank Jakarta on 22 June 2025, Senayan Bank DKI BRT station was renamed into Senayan Bank Jakarta on 8 September 2025, after a week of reparations following a burning incident during a series of protests on 29 August.

== Building and layout ==
Senayan Bank Jakarta BRT station has received two expansions, first in 2018 for the Asian Games and the second in 2022. The current building features two acacia trees within, which are retained and covered by transparent mica slab. The original tree, which was retained in the first expansion, was chopped down during the second work. The platform bays were increased to 12 (6 for each direction), and now includes toilets and a prayer room (musala). The recent 2022 design was designed by Pandega Desain Weharima (PDW), known for designing the Jakarta International Stadium, and has been nominated for IAI Jakarta Awards 2024 in Public Building, Transport Facilities subcategory by the Indonesian Architects Association (IAI).

North	to Kota, to Kalideres, to Pinang Ranti, to Tanjung Priok (Polda Metro Jaya/Semanggi/Gerbang Pemuda) →
Island platform, the platform doors are opened on the right side of the direction of travel
South	← (Bundaran Senayan) to Blok M, to Ragunan, and to Bundaran Senayan

== Non-BRT bus services ==
The following non-BRT bus services stop around the Senayan Bank Jakarta station, last updated on 1 July 2026:

Type	Route	Destination	Notes
Inner city feeder		Palmerah Station–Bundaran Senayan	Inside the station
Inner city feeder		Blok M–Senen	Outside the station
Inner city feeder		Blok M–Ancol	Inside the station
Inner city feeder		Pemuda Merdeka–Bundaran Senayan	
Inner city feeder		Bundaran Senayan–Tebet Station	
Inner city feeder		Blok M–Manggarai Station	Inside the station
Cross-border feeder (Transjabodetabek)		Alam Sutera–Blok M	Inside the station
Cross-border feeder (Transjabodetabek)		Soekarno–Hatta International Airport – Blok M	Outside the station
Cross-border feeder (Transjabodetabek)		Pantai Indah Kapuk 2–Blok M	Inside the station
Royaltrans		Cibubur–Blok M	Outside the station
Royaltrans		Summarecon Bekasi–Blok M	Outside the station
Royaltrans		SouthCity Cinere–Bundaran Senayan	Outside the station
#jakartaexplorer tour bus		Jakarta Skyscrapers (Pencakar Langit Jakarta)	Outside the station

== Places nearby ==
- Gelora Bung Karno Sports Complex
  - Gelora Bung Karno Main Stadium
  - Istora Gelora Bung Karno
  - Baseball Stadium
  - Softball Stadium
  - GBK City Park
- Menara Sudirman
- fX Sudirman
  - SM Entertainment Indonesia
  - Harris Suites FX Sudirman
  - JKT48 Theater
- CIMB Niaga Plaza
- Menara Mandiri
- Plaza APDA
- Summitmas Tower
- Sequis Center Tower
- The Energy Building
- Grand Lucky Building
- Artotel Gelora Senayan Jakarta Hotel
- Alila Suites
- Fairgrounds
- Ministry of Primary and Secondary Education
- Ministry of Higher Education, Science, and Technology
- Ministry of Culture

== Incident ==
Senayan Bank DKI BRT station was damaged after riots during mass protests on 29–30 August 2025. The masked culprits damaged the platform screen doors, burned the entrance area and the trees within, vandalized some parts of the building, and looted some vital and supporting properties. Storming started on 30 August at around 00:02 local time. After ten days of reparations, the station was reopened on 8 September 2025 under a new name "Senayan Bank Jakarta," although some damaged parts were not finished yet.

== Gallery ==
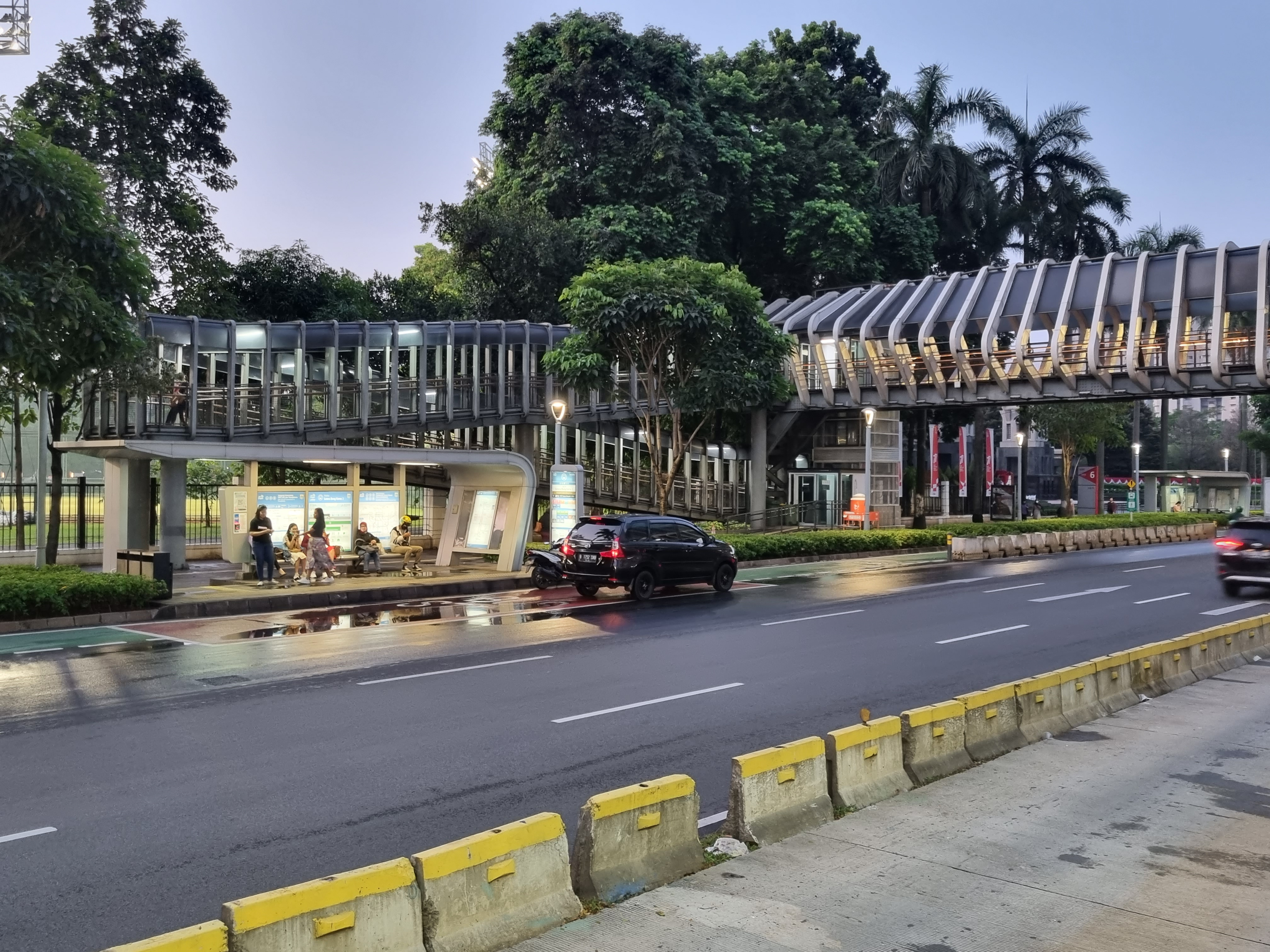
Pedestrian bridge to cross the street and to access both BRT station and non-BRT roadside bus stop

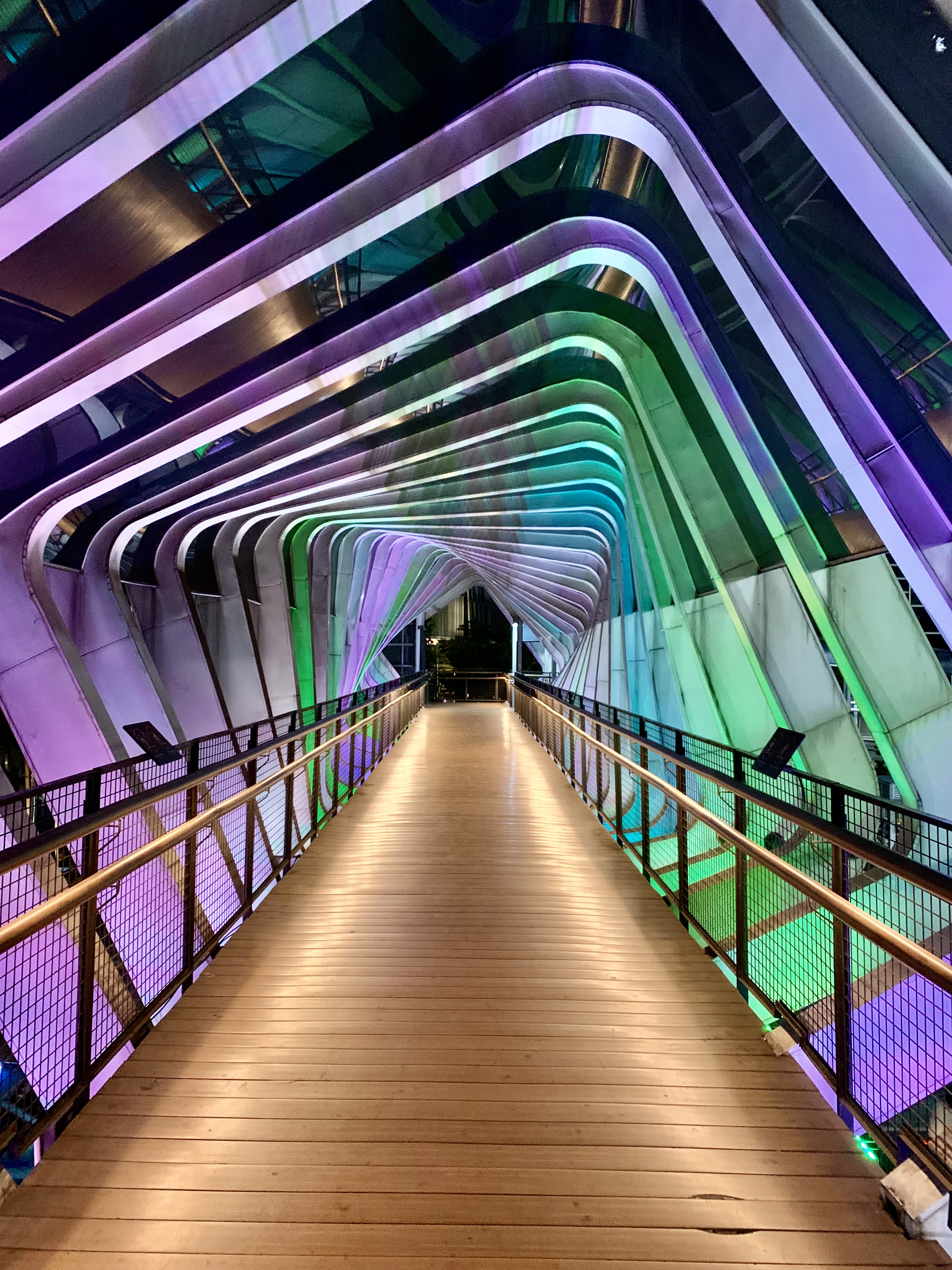
Gelora Bung Karno skybridge at night

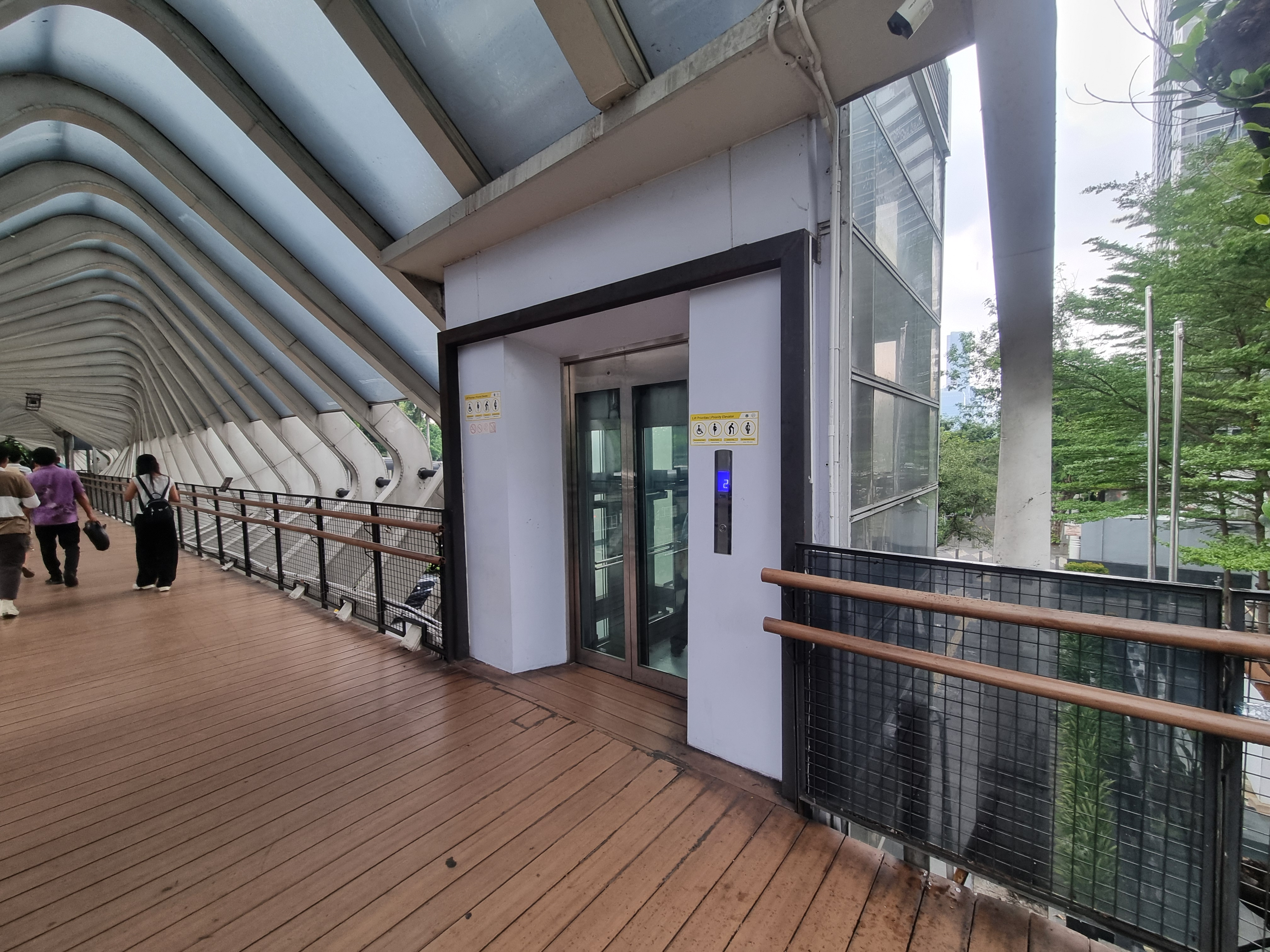
Elevators are only provided to access the skybridge only, as the entrance to the station uses a sloping ramp

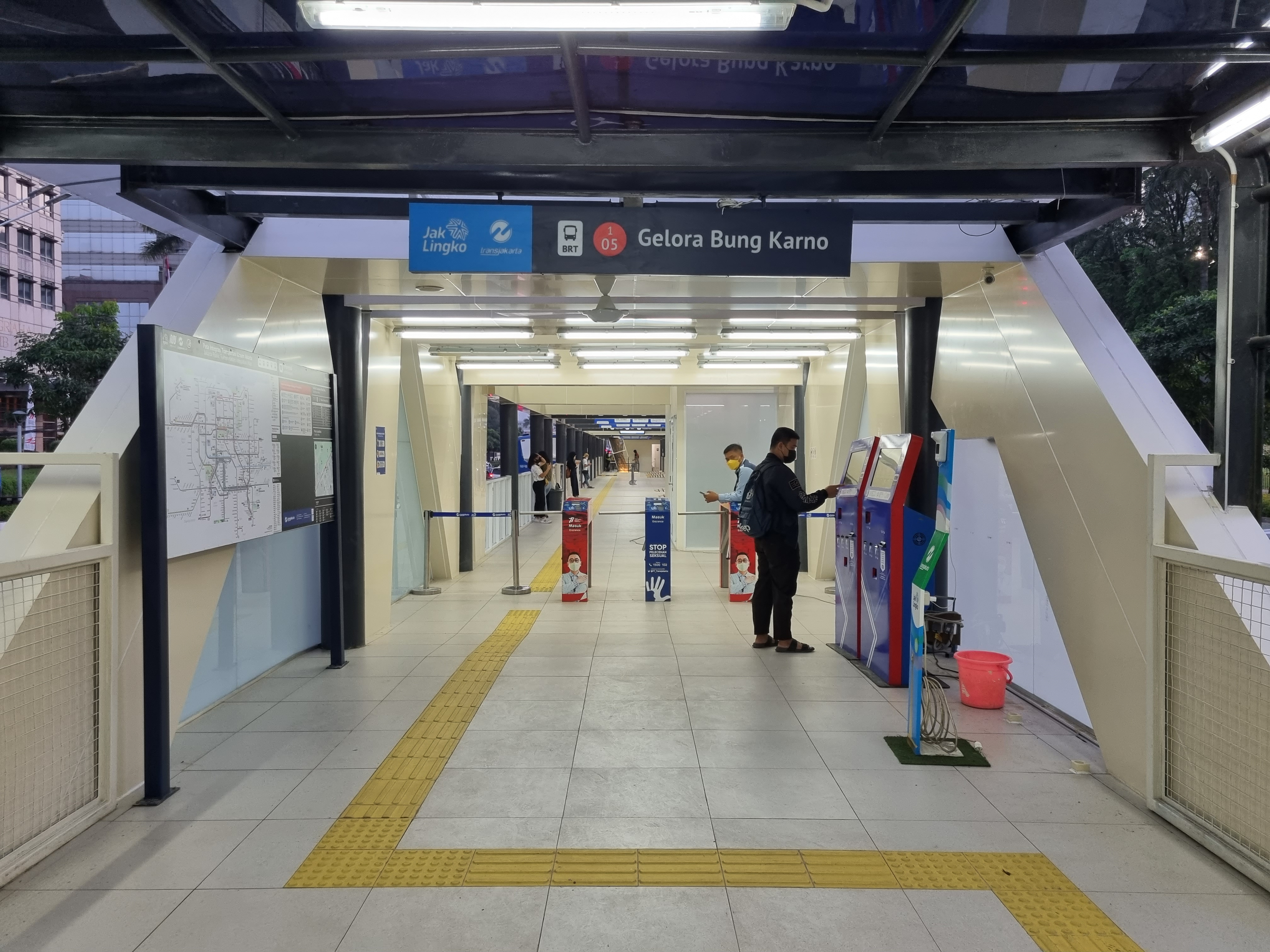
Fare gates at the entrance

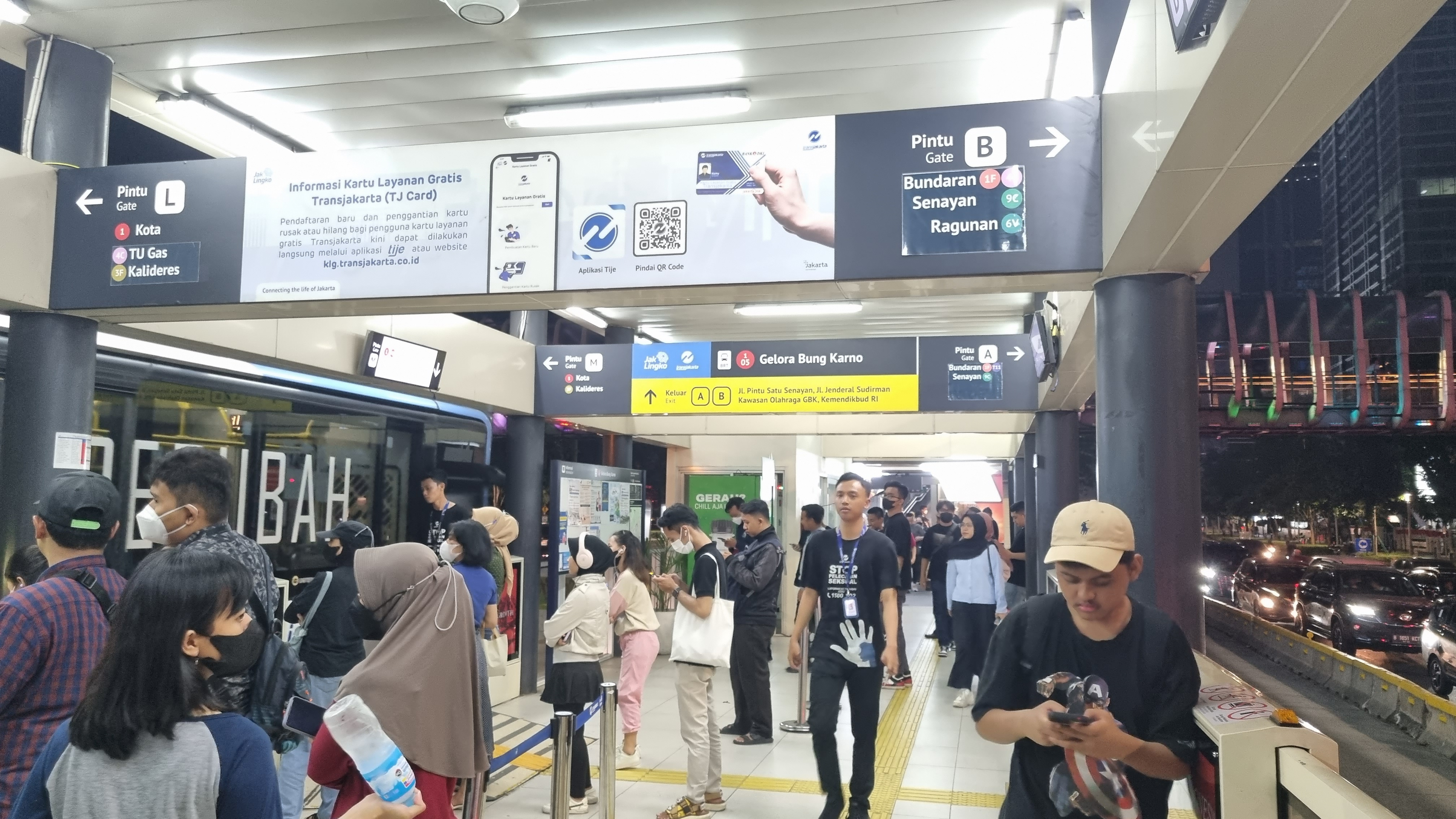
Inner view of the platform area

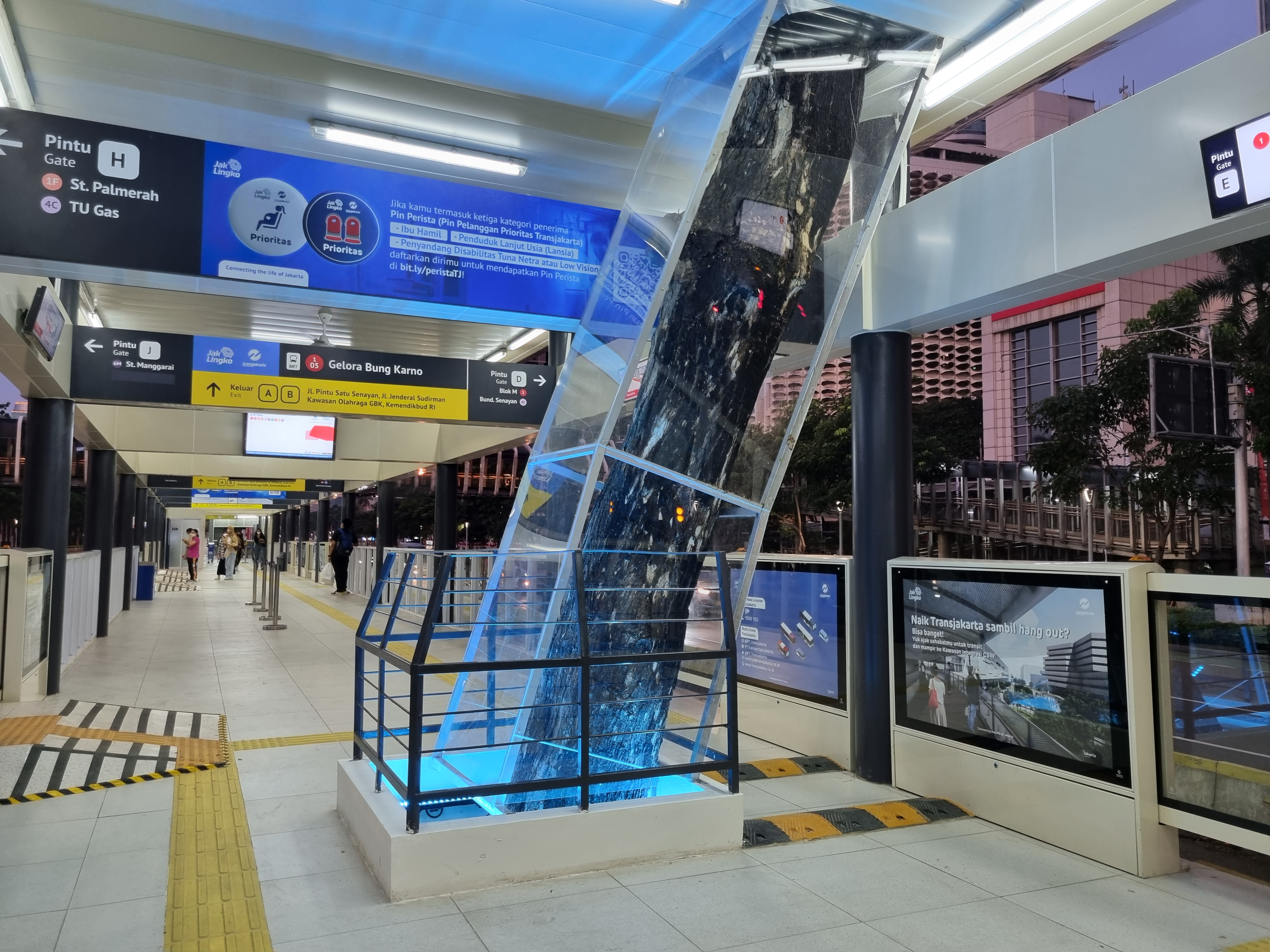
One of the two acacia trees inside the BRT station

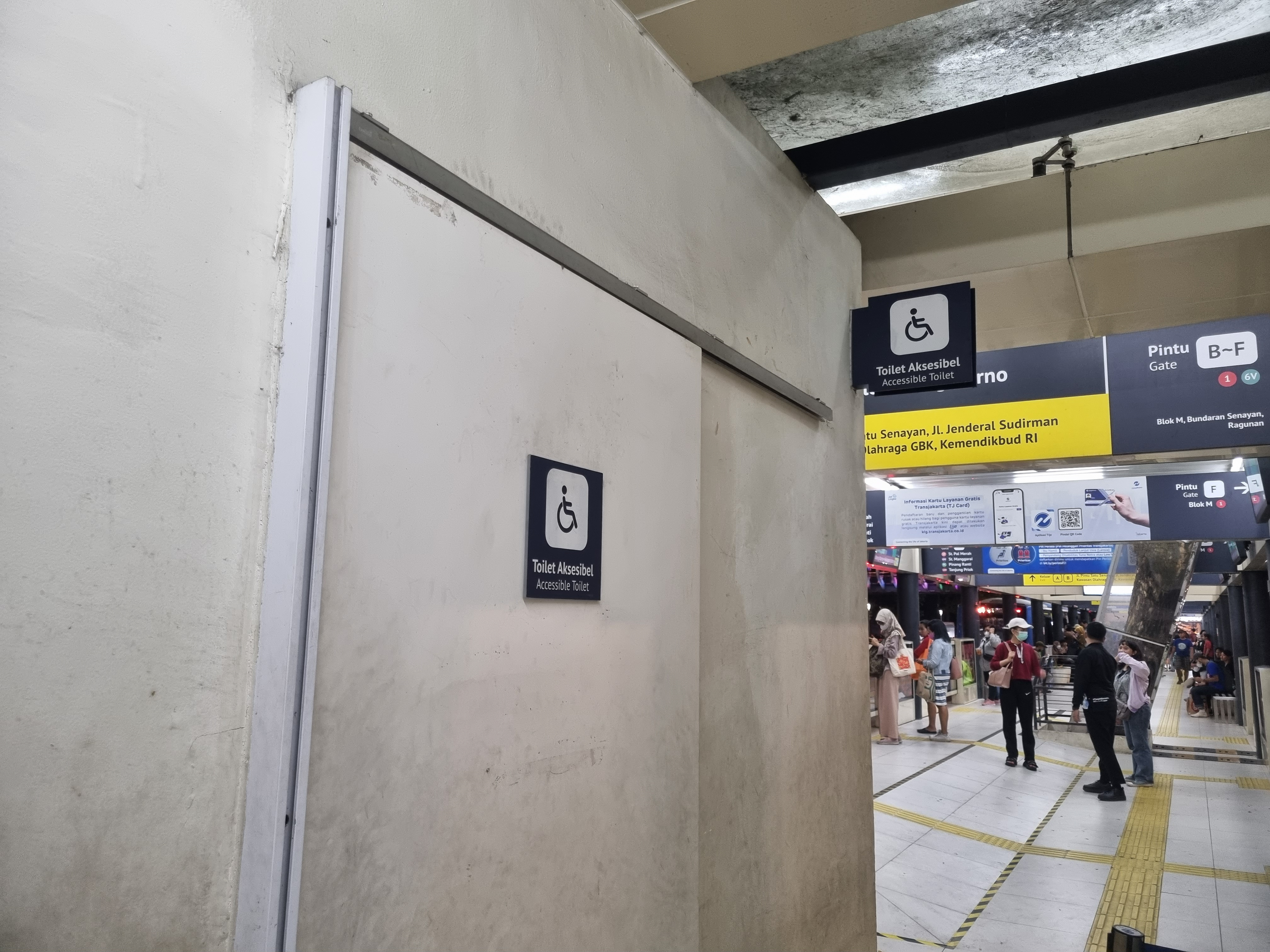
An accessible toilet at the southwestern end of the building
