= Masjid Agung (Transjakarta) =

Bus rapid transit station in Jakarta, Indonesia

1 03 Masjid Agung
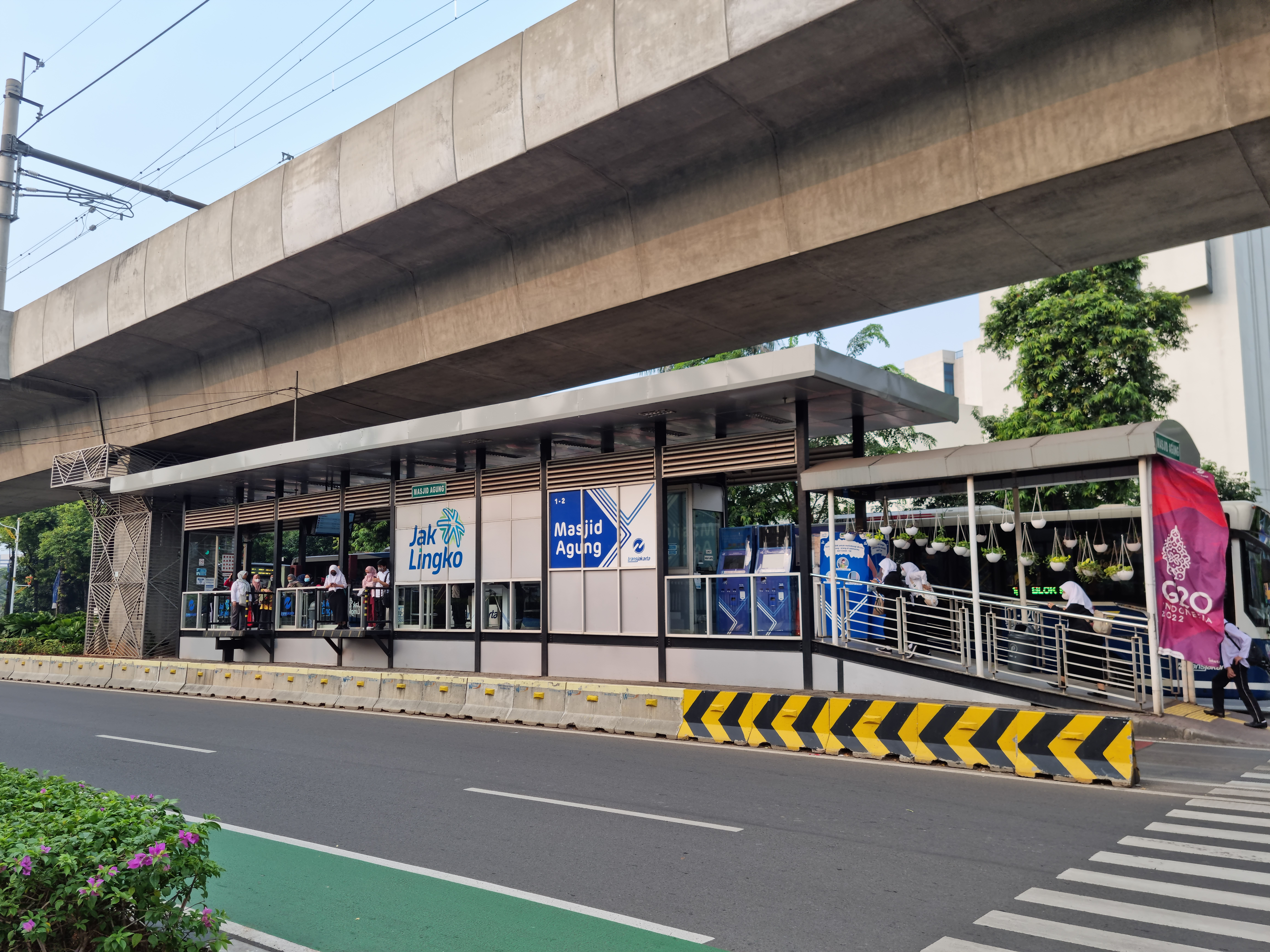

General information
- Location: Sisimangaraja Street; Selong, Kebayoran Baru (eastern side); Gunung, Kebayoran Baru (western side); South Jakarta, Indonesia
- Coordinates: 6.2352°S 106.7984°E
- System: Transjakarta bus rapid transit station
- Owner: Transjakarta
- Operator: Transjakarta
- Lines: List of Transjakarta corridors#Corridor 1 List of TransJakarta corridors#Cross-corridor routes
- Platforms: Single island platform

Construction
- Structure type: At-grade

Other information
- Status: In service

History
- Opened: 15 January 2004 (soft launching); 1 February 2004 (commercial operation)

Services
Preceding		Following
Kejaksaan Agung towards Blok M	Corridor 1	Bundaran Senayan One-way operation
ASEAN One-way operation	Corridor 1	Bundaran Senayan towards Kali Besar
Pasar Santa One-way operation	Corridor 6 Route 6V	Bundaran Senayan towards Senayan Bank Jakarta
ASEAN towards Ragunan	Corridor 6 Route 6V	Bundaran Senayan One-way operation
Location

Masjid Agung is a Transjakarta bus rapid transit station located next to the Al-Azhar Great Mosque (Masjid Agung Al-Azhar, hence the name) on Sisimangaraja Street, Kebayoran Baru, Jakarta, Indonesia, primarily serving Corridor 1.

== History ==
Masjid Agung BRT station opened a month after the inauguration of corridor 1. It was originally located in front of the mosque's western exit, 200 meters north of the current location. The original station was tiny, having only one gate on each side of the platform, constructed on the road median. The station's main entrance was in form of a skybridge located in front of the mosque and on Hang Tuah III Street.

On 28 August 2014, a fire burned the Masjid Agung BRT station, it first came from the bus stopping here. As the result, all services were suspended for a mean time. Later, two separated temporary buildings were constructed on road sides as the burned out existing building would be demolished for the Jakarta MRT construction. The skybridge access was closed for demolition on 17 November 2014.

After the MRT construction completed, a new permanent building for Masjid Agung was built around June 2018, this time situated on the road median below the MRT track and adjacent with the Hang Tuah VII and Raden Patah II intersection to the south.

== Building and layout ==
Masjid Agung BRT station is now located beneath the viaduct of the MRT North-South Line. It was made bigger with two gates on each side of the platform. The station's design looks different from the old structure's, resembling the design of Corridor 2's and Corridor 5's station platforms extension. The station is accessible via a zebra crossing located at the traffic light south of the station.

West	towards Kota and towards Senayan Bank Jakarta (Bundaran Senayan) →
Island platform, the platform doors are opened on the right side of the direction of travel
East	← (Kejaksaan Agung) towards Blok M and towards Ragunan

== Non-BRT bus services ==
The following non-BRT bus services stop around the Masjid Agung station, last updated on 6 December 2025:

Type	Route	Destination	Notes
Inner-city feeder		Blok M–Ancol	Inside the station
Inner-city feeder		Manggarai–Blok M	Inside the station
Cross-border feeder (Transjabodetabek)		Alam Sutera—Blok M	Inside the station
Cross-border feeder (Transjabodetabek)		PIK 2—Blok M	Inside the station

== Places nearby ==
- Al-Azhar Great Mosque
- Ministry of Public Works

== Incidents ==
On 28 August 2014, a bus that was procured around a month before by Transjakarta bursted into flame and melted part of the original structure of the station. It happened during rush hour, but there were no casualties.

== Gallery ==
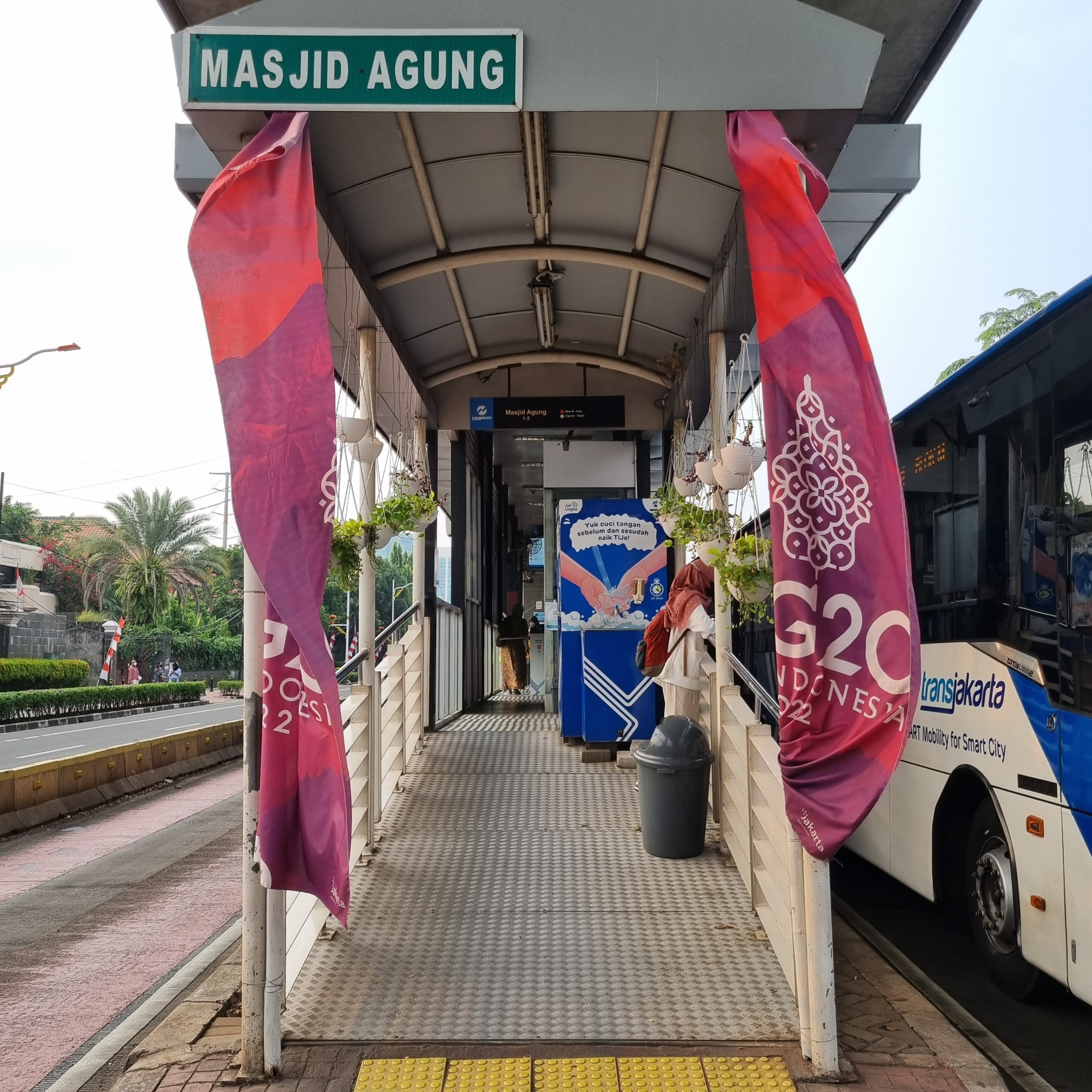
Entrance of the station, 2022

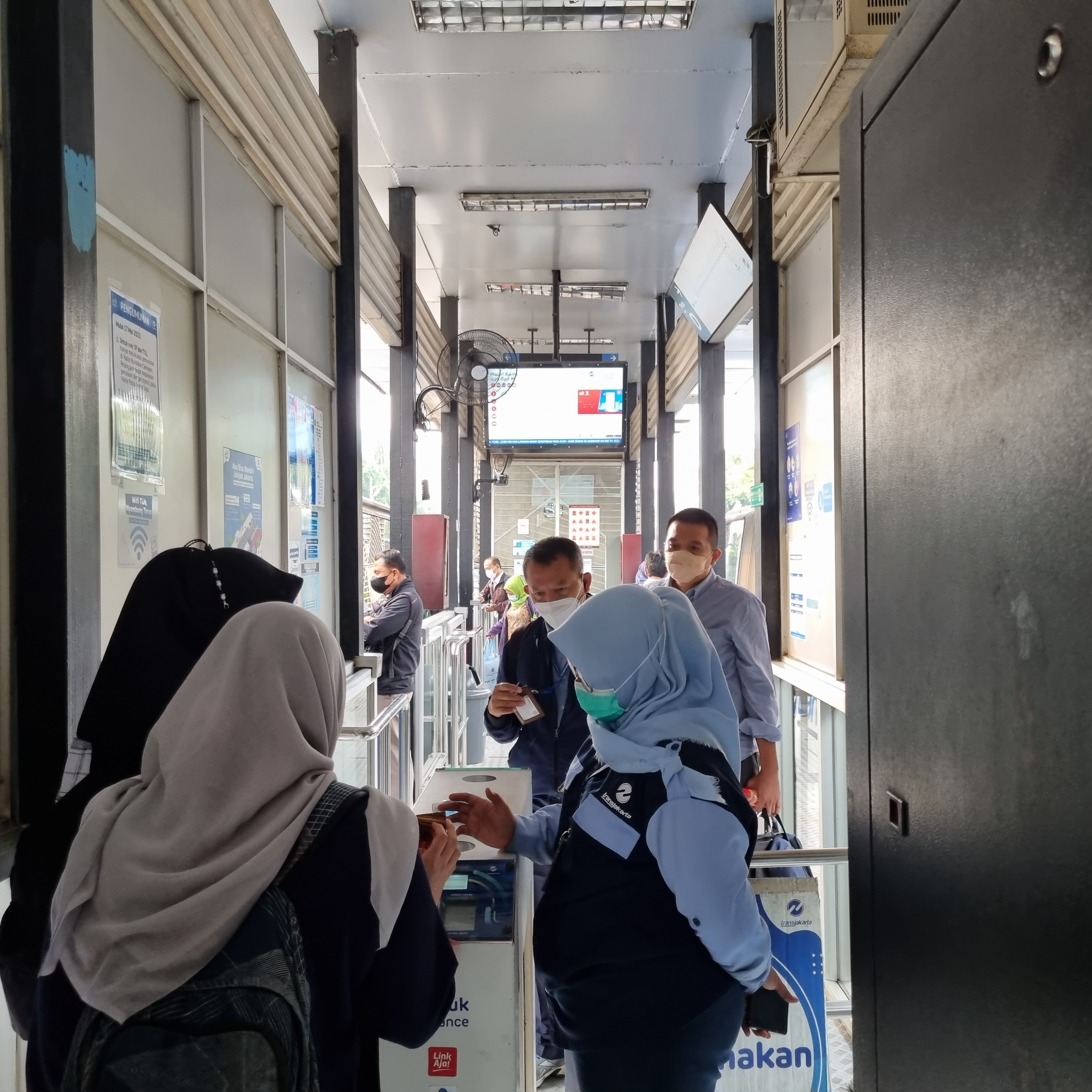
Inner view, 2022

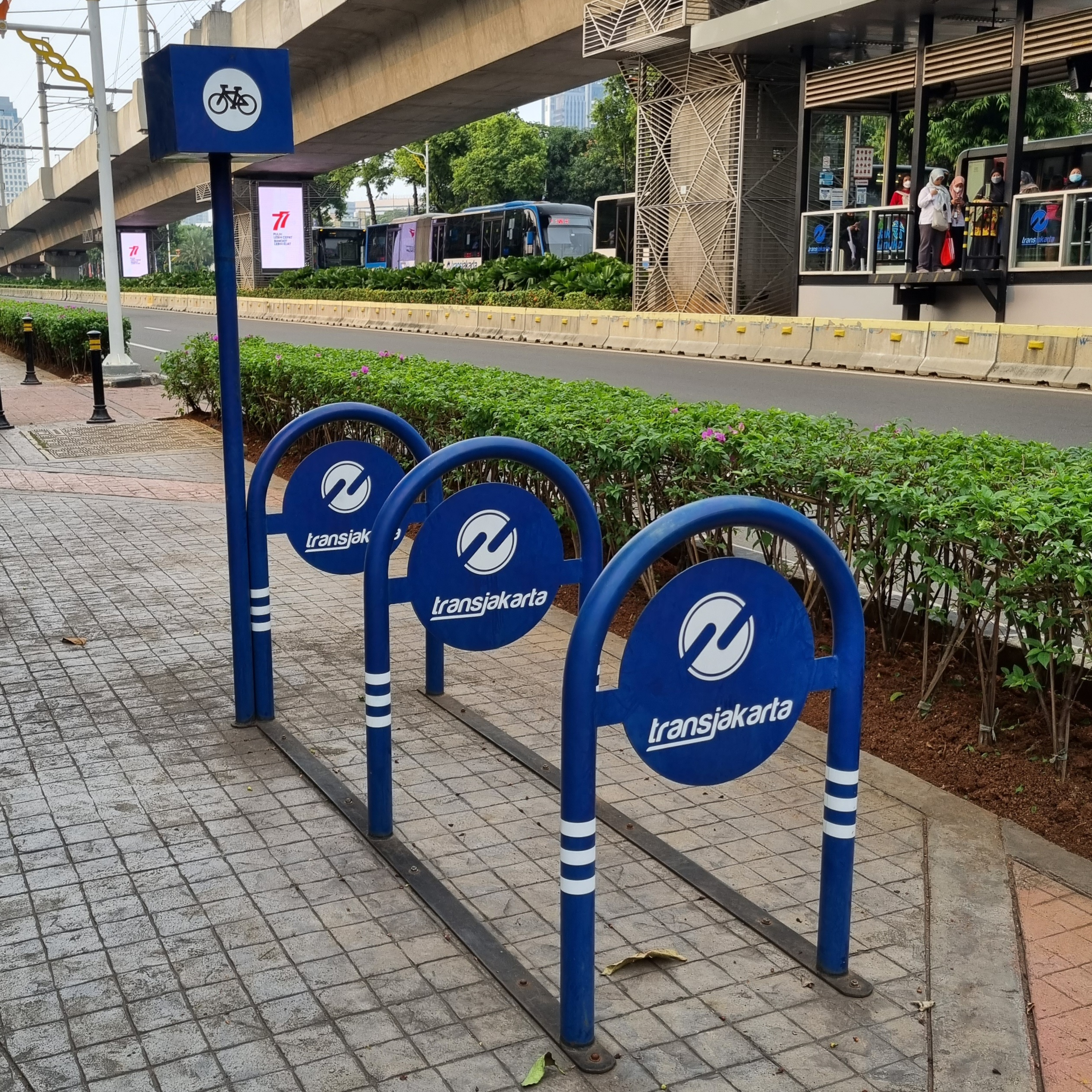
Racks for bicycle parking near the station, 2022
