= Bundaran Senayan (Transjakarta) =

Bus rapid transit station in Jakarta, Indonesia

1 04 Bundaran Senayan
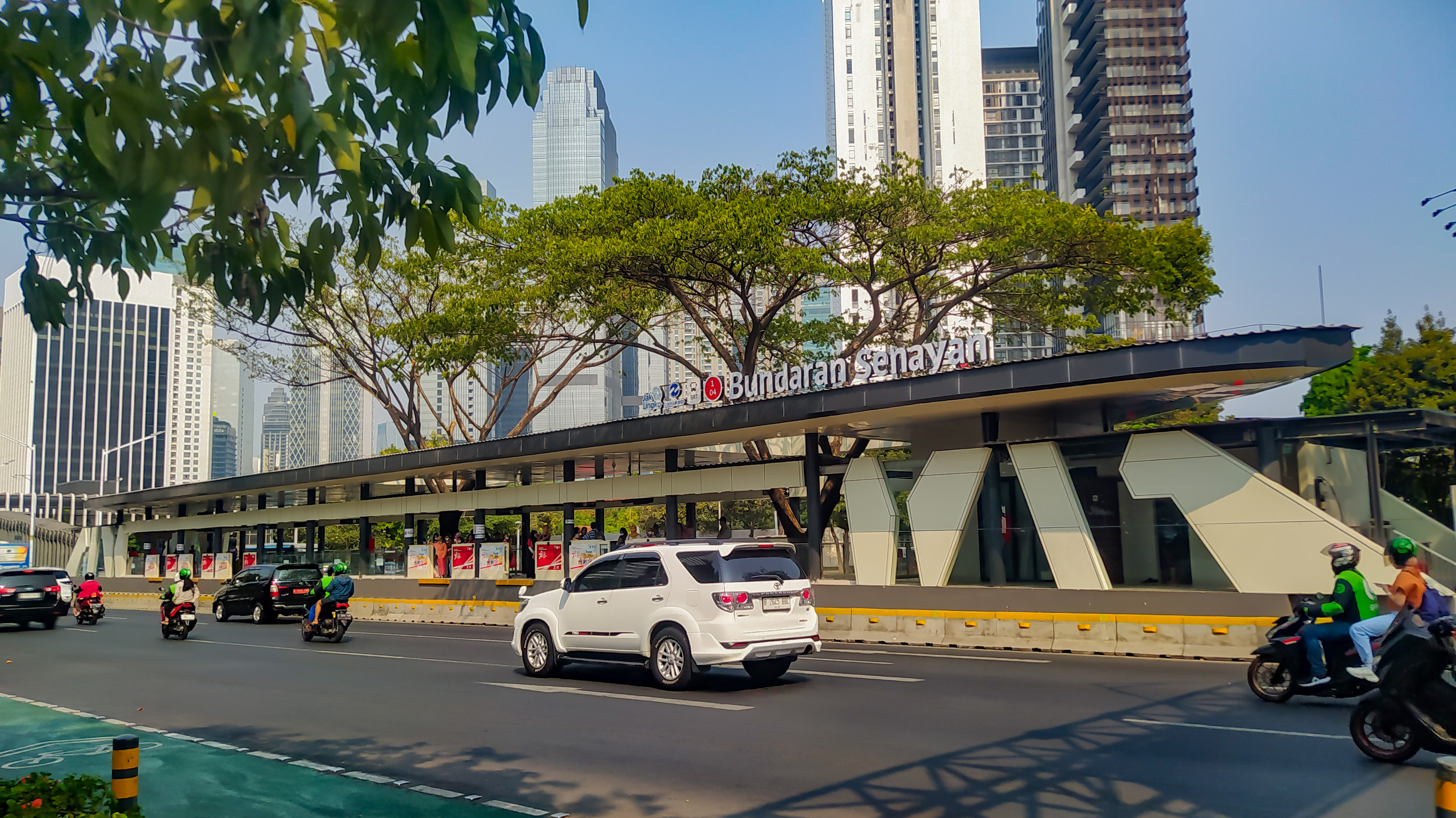

General information
- Other names: Bunsen
- Location: Jenderal Sudirman Street; Gelora, Tanah Abang, Central Jakarta (northern side); Senayan, Kebayoran Baru, South Jakarta (southern side); Indonesia
- Coordinates: 6.2274°S 106.8015°E
- System: Transjakarta bus rapid transit station
- Lines: List of Transjakarta corridors#Corridor 1 List of TransJakarta corridors#Cross-corridor routes
- Platforms: Single island platform
- Connections: Senayan Mastercard

Construction
- Structure type: At-grade

Other information
- Status: In service

History
- Opened: 15 January 2004 (soft launching); 1 February 2004 (commercial operation)
- Rebuilt: 31 August 2023

Services
Preceding		Following
Masjid Agung towards Blok M	Corridor 1	Senayan Bank Jakarta towards Kali Besar
Masjid Agung towards Ragunan	Corridor 6 Route 6V	Senayan Bank Jakarta Terminus
Senayan Bank Jakarta towards Pinang Ranti	Corridor 9 Route 9C Terminus	Terminus
Senayan Bank Jakarta towards Tanjung Priok	Corridor 10 Route 10H Terminus	Terminus
Location

Bundaran Senayan (abbreviated Bunsen) is a Transjakarta bus rapid transit station located on Jenderal Sudirman Street, Kebayoran Baru, Jakarta, Indonesia. It primarily serves Corridor 1, but also serves as the terminus of cross-corridor routes 9C and 10H, as well as the feeder route 1F serving Palmerah KRL station.

The name 'Bundaran Senayan' (Indonesian for 'Senayan Roundabout') is named after a roundabout with the same name to the southwest of this station, which is the southern end of the Jenderal Sudirman Street. The roundabout features the iconic Patung Pemuda Membangun (lit. 'Youth Advancement Monument').

== History ==
When it first opened in 2004 and was then-spelled as Bunderan Senayan, it was located right in front of Ratu Plaza shopping mall. It had three gates on each side of the platform, with only two gates serving passengers. In 2014, it was relocated slightly to the southwest, adjacent with the Ministry of State Apparatus Utilization and Bureaucratic Reform headquarters at south, to make way for the construction of the Senayan MRT station.

On 31 May 2023, Bundaran Senayan station, alongside Karet Sudirman (now known as Karet) and Slipi Petamburan (now Petamburan) stations were closed for revitalisation works. In preparation of the 43rd ASEAN Summit held on 4 – 7 September, reconstruction of the new Bundaran Senayan station was sped up until its completion and reopening on 31 August 2023, just two months after closure.

== Building and layout ==
The new Bundaran Senayan station has an open-air design that allows the air to circulate freely. Having a similar design to that of Senayan Bank Jakarta and Karet stations, it has multiple tall pillars supporting an aluminium panel. The staffed ticket counter was also removed and replaced with a vending machine. The building is slightly longer than before. The unique feature in Bundaran Senayan is the two trembesi (samanea saman) trees inside, left untouched from the revitalisation and provided void to grow freely. Aside from that, the connection bridge of Bundaran Senayan station also has an artistic design after being revitalised earlier in 2019, as well as those in Senayan Bank Jakarta and Polda Metro Jaya BRT stations.

The following is the layout of the Bundaran Senayan station platform based on the routes served, last updated on 1 December 2024:

West	towards Pinang Ranti and towards Tanjung Priok		towards Kota and towards Senayan Bank Jakarta	(Senayan Bank Jakarta) →
Island platform, the platform doors are opened on the right side of the direction of travel
East	← (Masjid Agung)	towards Blok M and arrivals	towards Ragunan and arrivals

== Non-BRT bus services ==
The following non-BRT bus services stop around the Bundaran Senayan station, last updated on 1 July 2026:

Type	Route	Destination	Notes
Inner city feeder		Bundaran Senayan–Palmerah Station	Inside the station
Inner city feeder		Senen–Blok M	Outside the station
Inner city feeder		Ancol–Blok M	Inside the station
Inner city feeder		Bundoaran Senayan–JIEP Pulo Gadung	Outside the station
Inner city feeder		Bundaran Senayan–Tebet Station	Outside the station
Inner city feeder		Manggarai Station–Blok M	Inside the station
Cross-border feeder (Transjabodetabek)		Blok M—Alam Sutera	Inside the station
Cross-border feeder (Transjabodetabek)		Blok M – Soekarno–Hatta International Airport	Outside the station
Royaltrans (premium)		Cibubur Junction–Blok M	Outside the station
Royaltrans (premium)		Bundaran Senayan–Summarecon Mall Bekasi	Outside the station
Royaltrans (premium)		Bundaran Senayan–South City Cinere	Outside the station
#jakartaexplorer double-decker tour bus routes		Jakarta Skyscrapers (Pencakar Langit Jakarta)	Outside the station

== Places nearby ==
- Ratu Plaza
- Panin Bank Centre
  - Embassy of Papua New Guinea
- Ministry of State Apparatus Utilization and Bureaucratic Reform
- Senayan Trade Centre (STC Senayan)
- Senayan City
- Plaza Senayan

== Incident ==
On 29 August 2025, rioters during a nationwide protests burned down a few part of the Bundaran Senayan BRT station, with the southern end of the building sustained the burn damage. The culprits also looted the properties inside and broke the platform doors and half-height glass doors. The station went out of service for a week of reparations, and was reopened on 6 September.

== Gallery ==
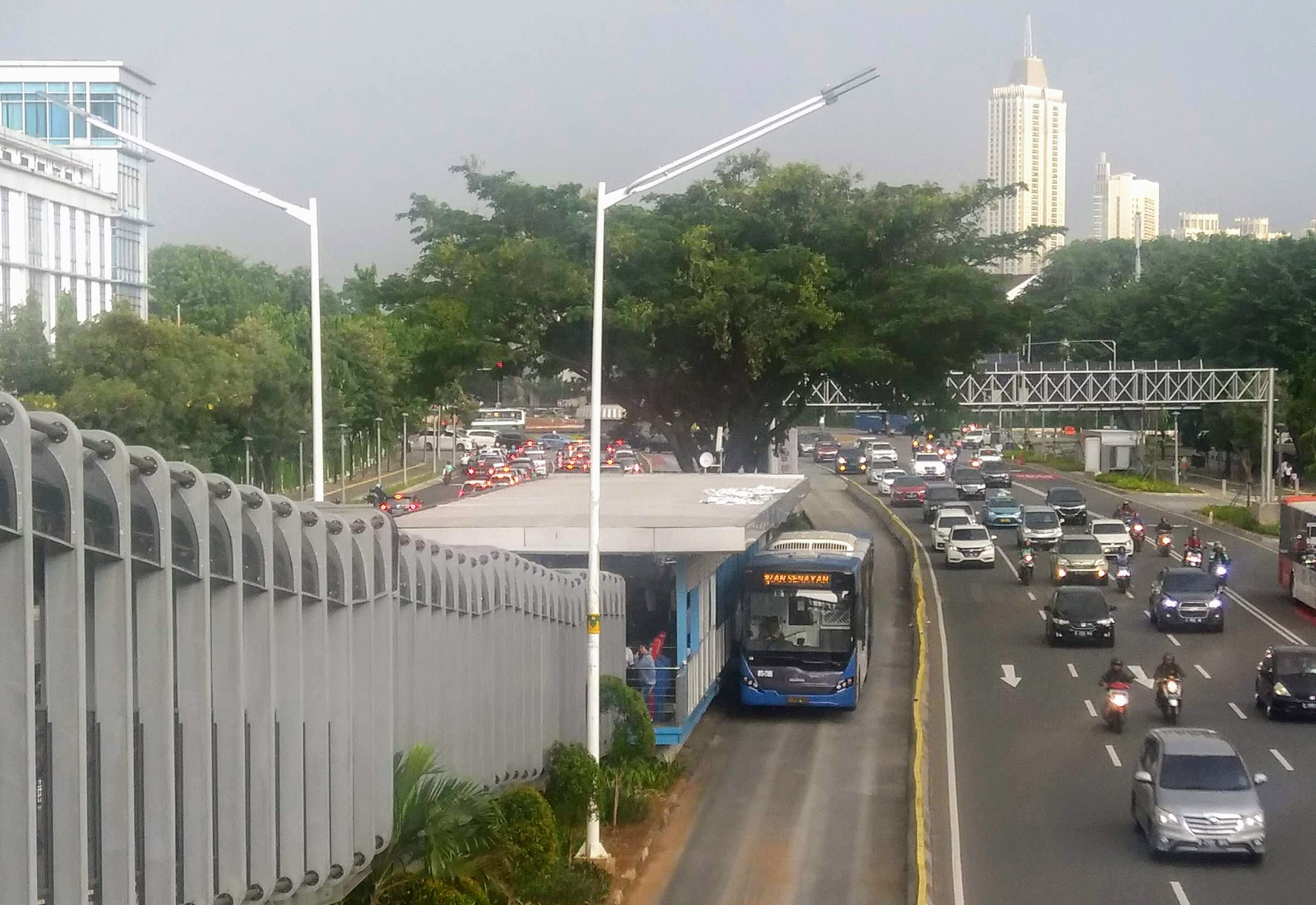
The station prior to revitalisation, seen from connection bridge, 2019

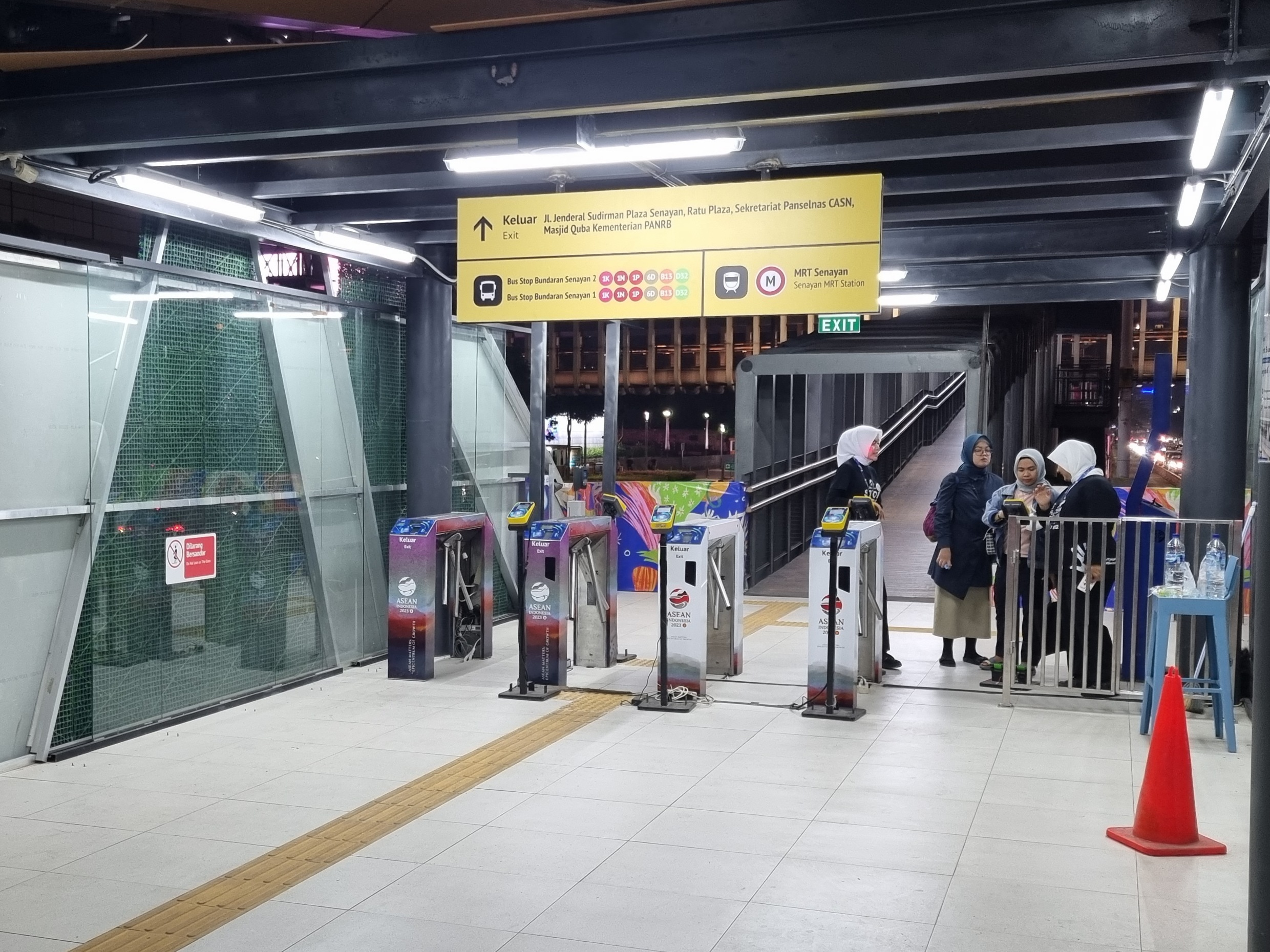
Fare gates at the entrance, 2023

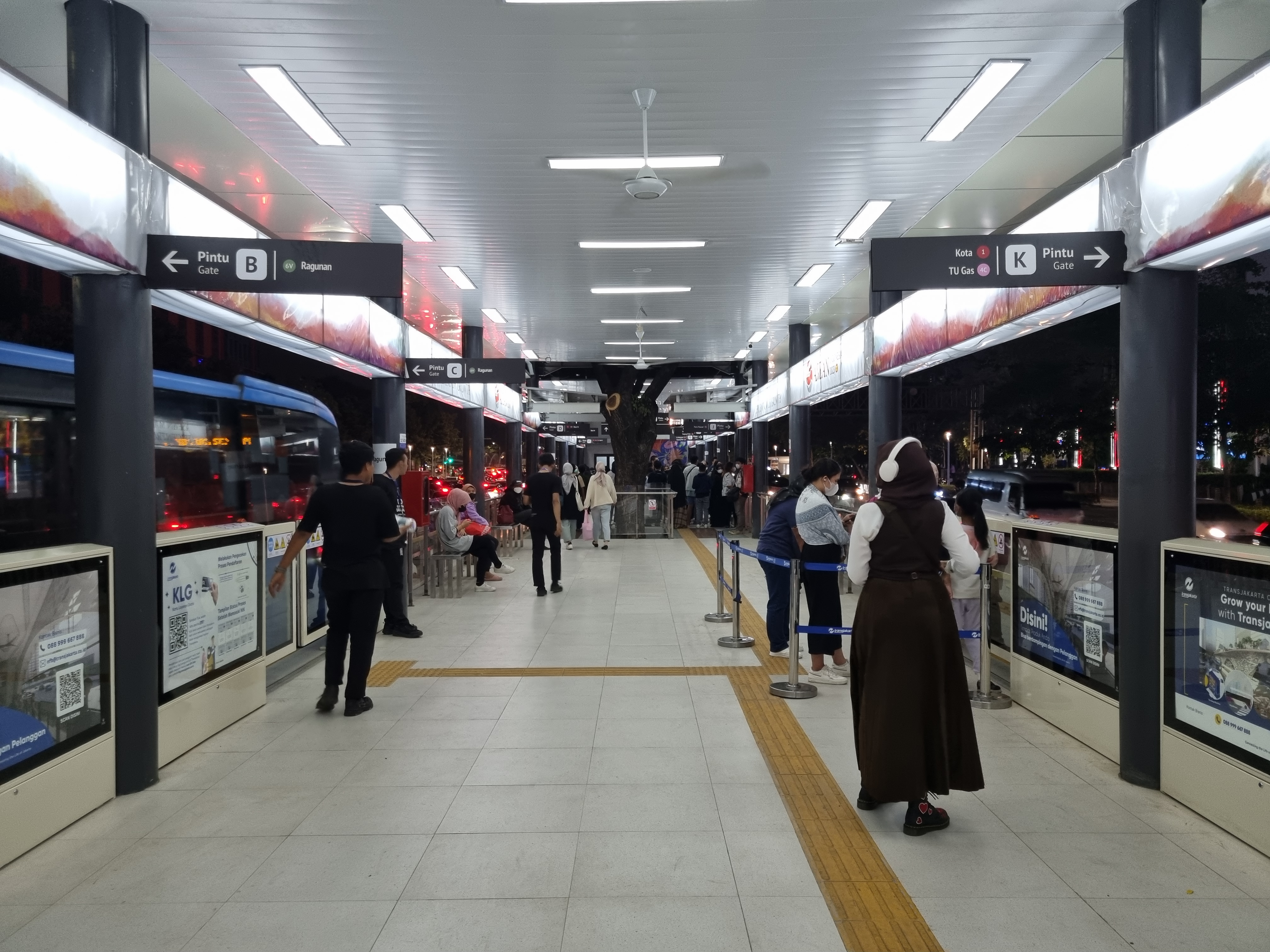
Inner view of the station after revitalisation, 2023

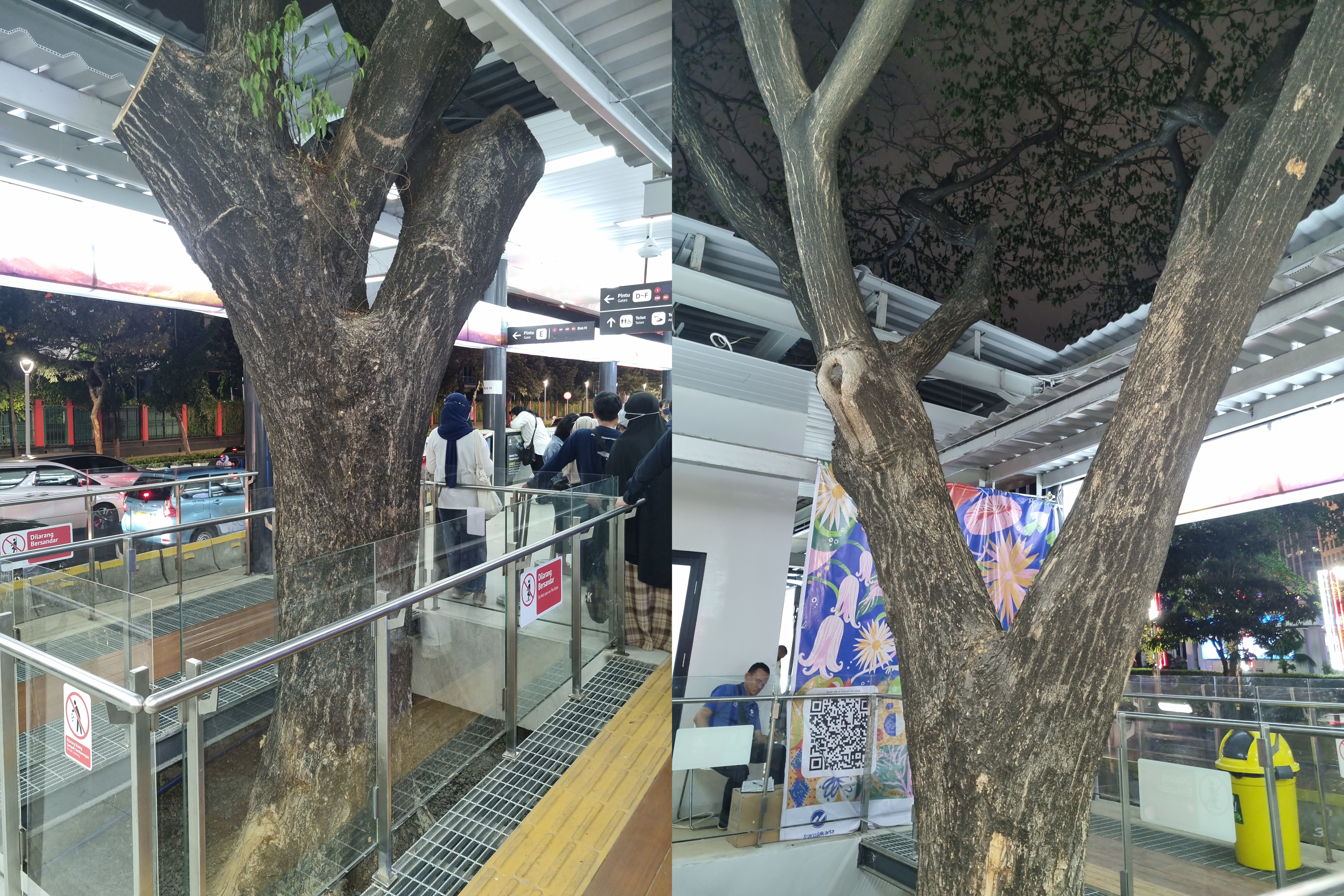
Two trembesi trees within the station, as they were retained during revitalisation, 2023

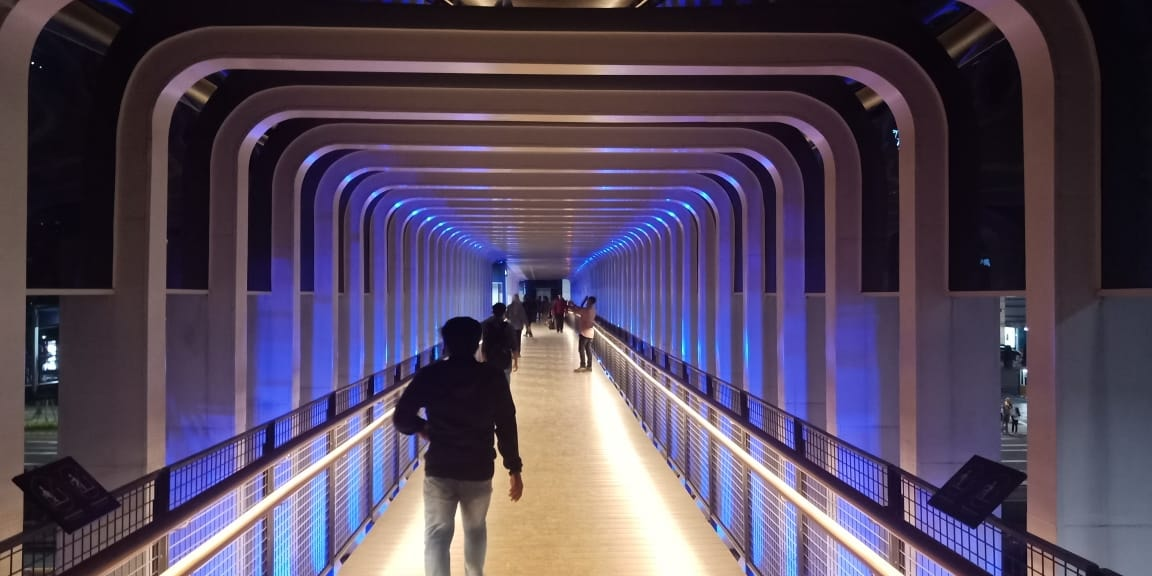
The iconically-redesigned connection bridge of the station, lit blue to commemorate World Autism Awareness Day in 2019
