= GBK City Park =

Urban park in GBK Sports Complex, Jakarta, Indonesia

- Hutan Kota GBK
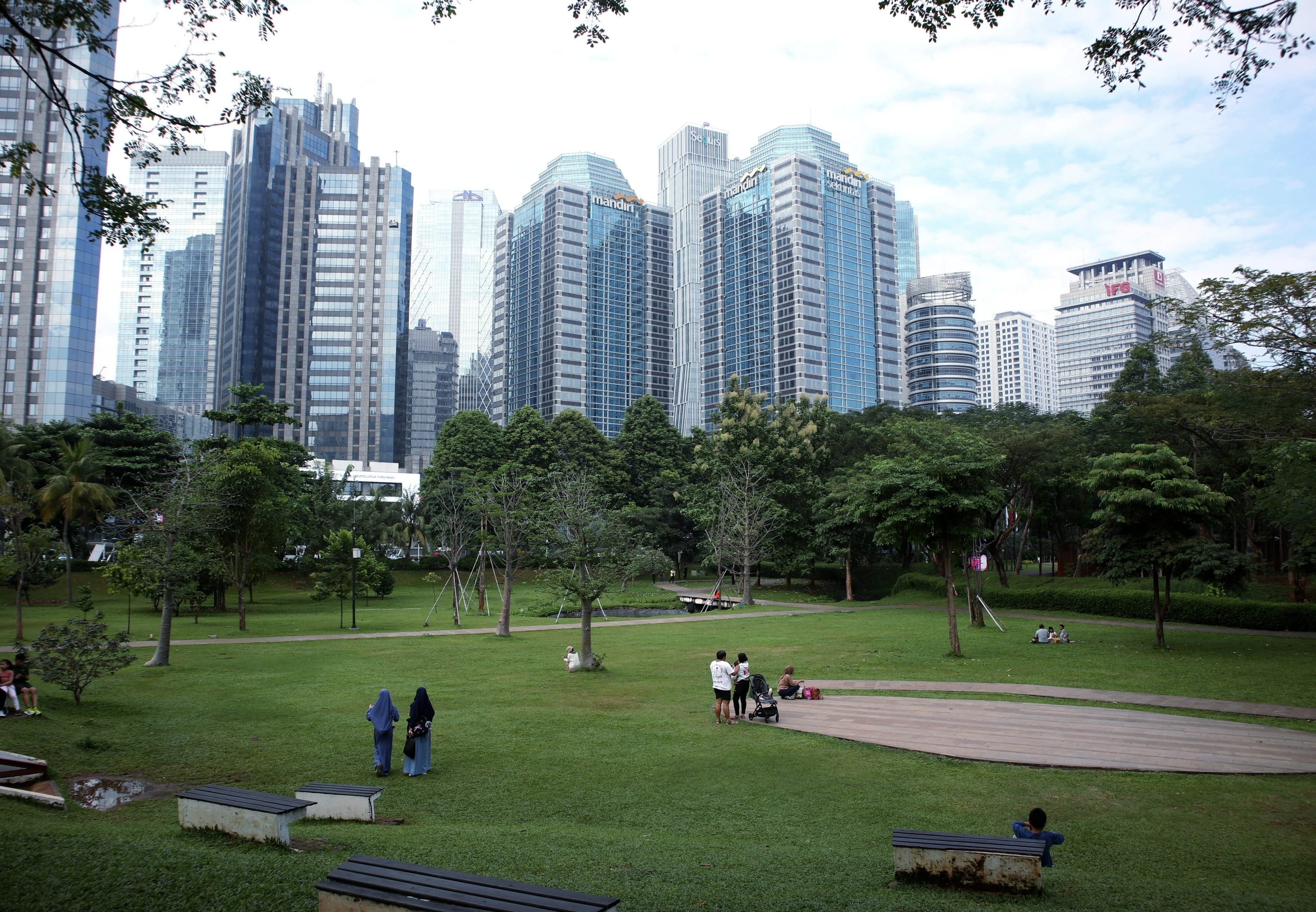
- The GBK Park taken on 2024
- Interactive map of GBK City Park
- Type: Urban park
- Location: Gelora Bung Karno Sports Complex, Jakarta, Indonesia
- Coordinates: 6.221667°S 106.807778°E
- Area: 4.5 hectares (11 acres)
- Created: December 19, 2019
- Owner: Pusat Pengelolaan Komplek Gelora Bung Karno (PPKGBK, Gelora Bung Karno Complex Management Center)
- Operator: Gelora Bung Karno Complex Management Center; Plataran Indonesia
- Status: Open all year
- Public transit: Istora Mandiri; Palmerah; Senayan Bank Jakarta; Gerbang Pemuda
- Website: www.plataran.com

GBK City Park (Indonesian: Hutan Kota GBK, lit. 'GBK City Forest') is an multifunctional urban park located in Gelora Bung Karno Sports Complex in Central Jakarta, Jakarta, Indonesia. This park is divided into two sections. The Gelora Bung Karno Complex Management Center (PPKGBK) manages a 1.3-hectare picnic area, while Plataran Indonesia, an Indonesian hospitality company, operates the remaining 3.2 hectares under the name Hutan Kota by Plataran.

Hutan Kota by Plataran features a variety of premium amenities, including multiple dining venues, a coffee lounge, a rooftop, and several event spaces. The park also offers a dedicated pet playground, outdoor sports facilities like a basketball court and a jogging track, a cultural tribute park, an amphitheater, an exhibition deck, and a prayer room (musala).

It is used for various activities with a strategic location and beautiful views with an area of 4.5 ha.

== Facilities ==
The 4 hectare land has been designated as the lungs of the city. Apart from the grass garden, this place also has a trembesi pool area with a wooden base concept on top.

Visitors can also exercise here. there is a jogging track which is specially designed for runners. Not only that, there is also a security post, park benches, toilets and changing rooms that can be used by visitors. There is also a food court here and small food stalls are also available inside.

Those who want to have a picnic are also welcome. Many visitors bring their own mats and food.

== Gallery ==
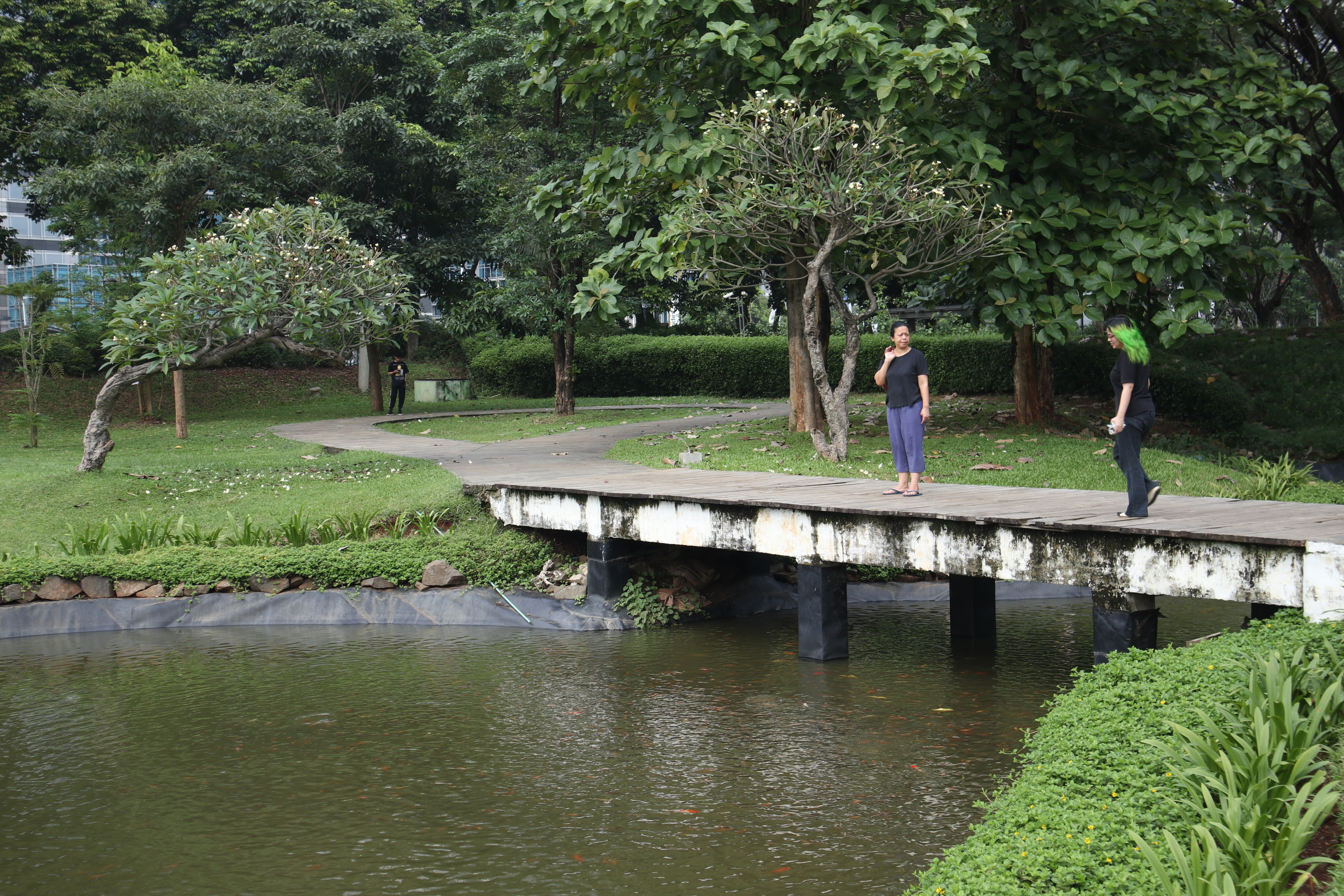
Bridge

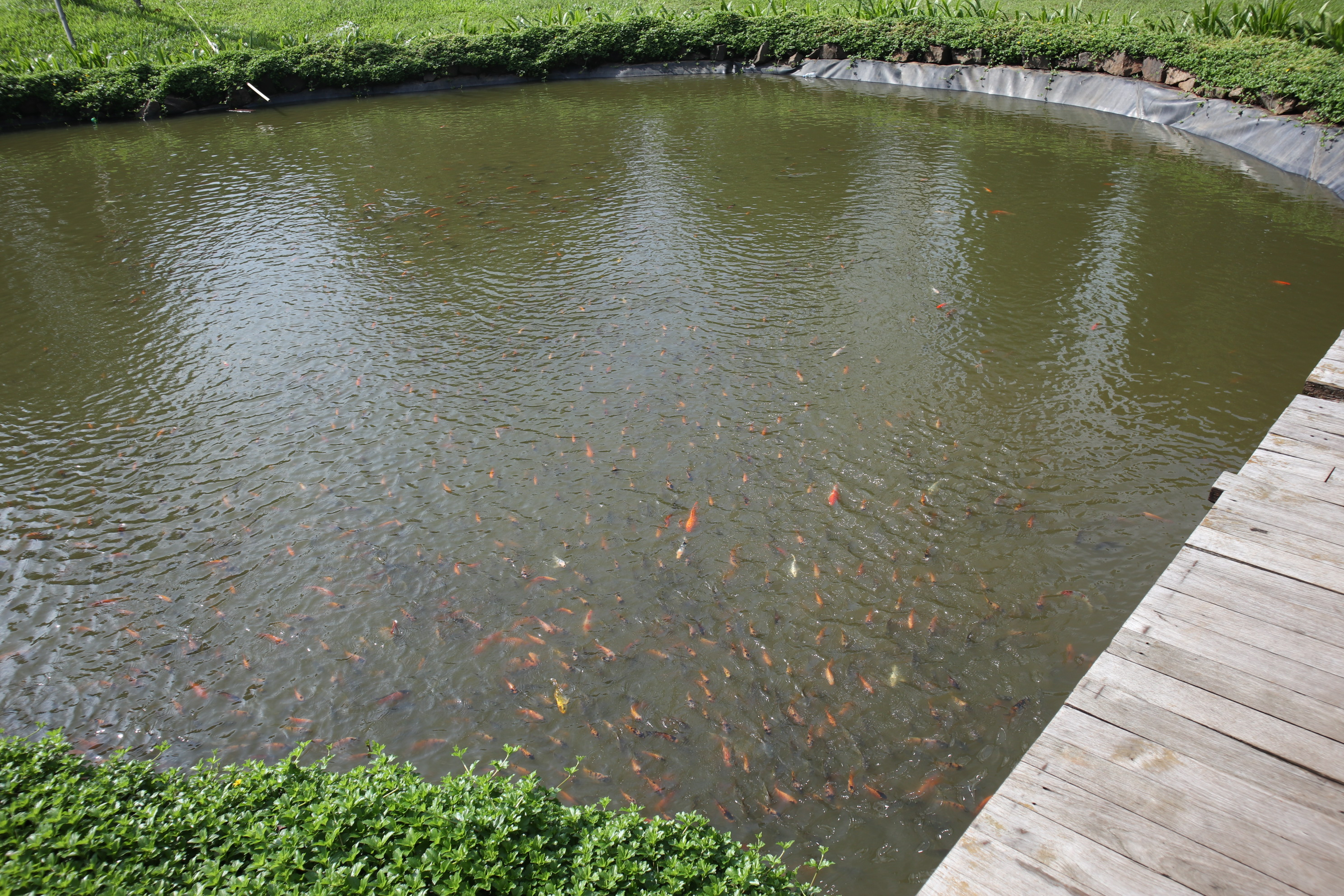
Fish pond

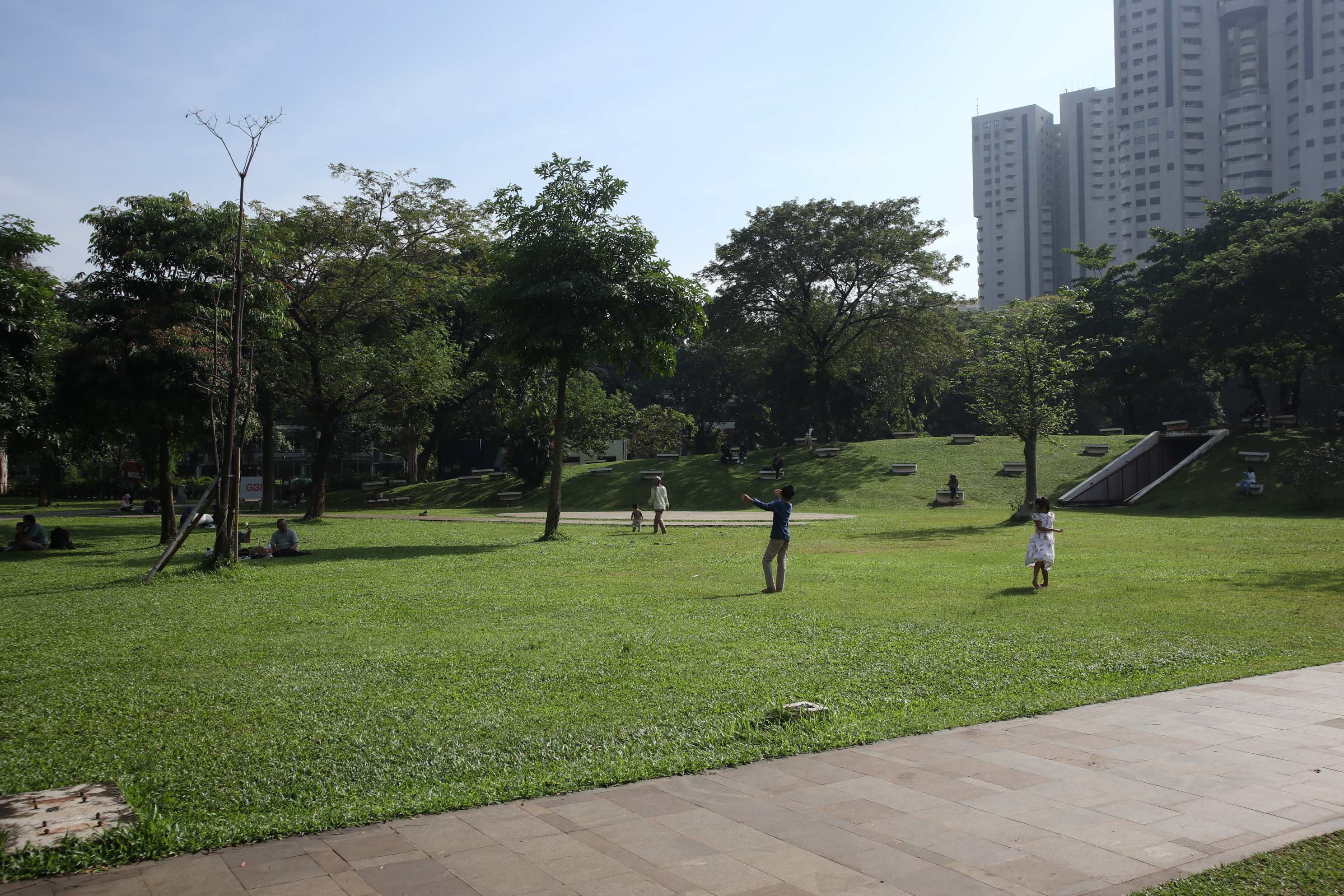
Picnic place

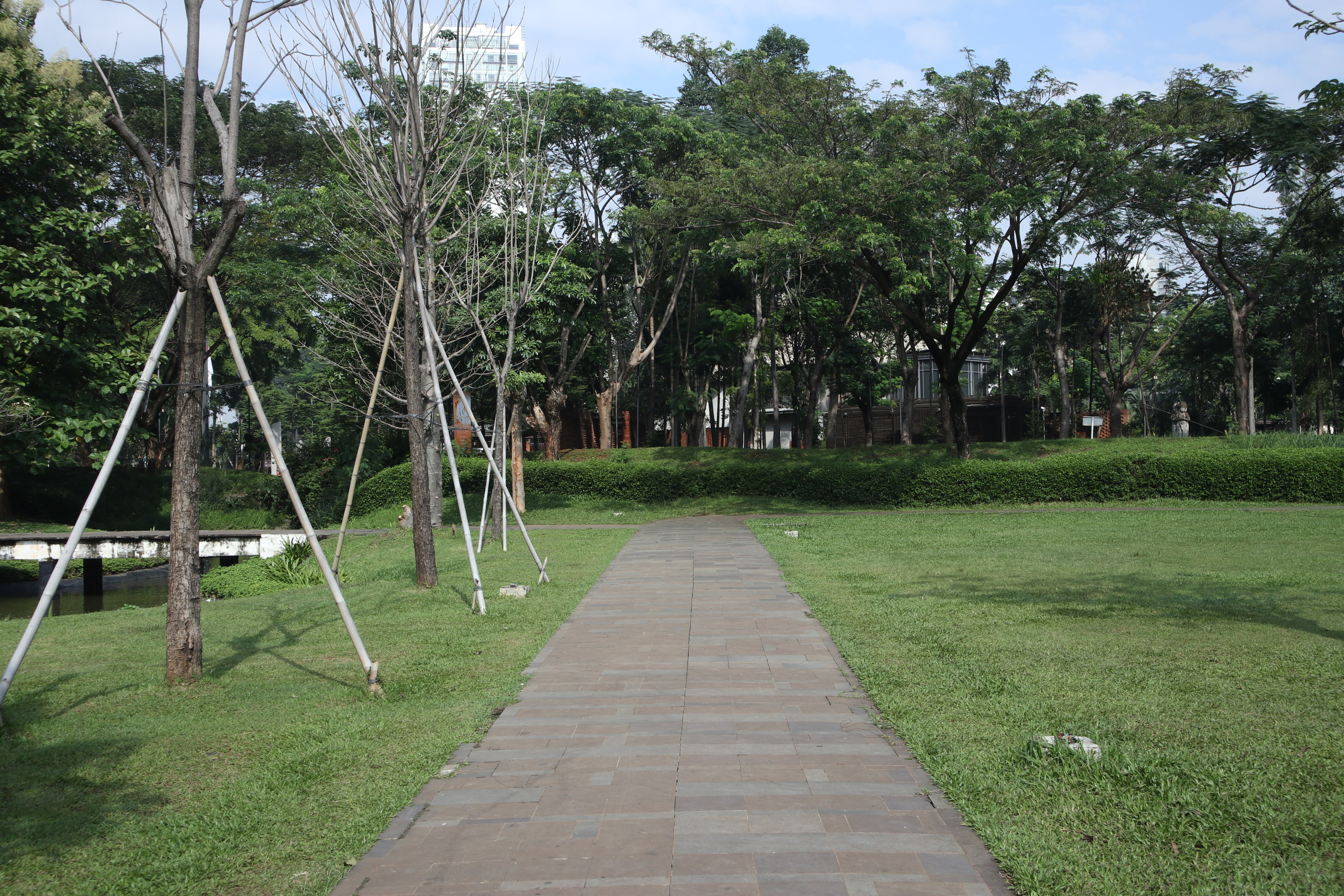
Pedestrian
